= André Sogliuzzo =

American voice actor

- Born: August 10, 1966 (age 60); New York City, U.S.
- Occupations: Voice actor; comedian
- Years active: 1990s–present
- Spouse: Justine Miceli

André Sogliuzzo (born August 10, 1966) is an American voice actor and comedian. He is best known for his roles in Avatar: The Last Airbender (2005–2008), Darksiders II (2012), Final Fantasy XIII (2009), Jackie Chan Adventures (2001–2002), Need for Speed: Most Wanted, Psychonauts (both 2005), Scarface: The World Is Yours (2006), the Spyro series, Star Wars: Clone Wars (2003–2005), The Elder Scrolls V: Skyrim (2011) and Transformers: Devastation (2015).

== Early life ==
Sogliuzzo was born in New York City on August 10, 1966.

== Career ==
From 2004 to 2015, Sogliuzzo served as the main replacement voice actor for Puss in Boots in the Shrek franchise whenever Antonio Banderas was unavailable, voicing the character in video games, commercials, and DreamworksTV content, as well as replacing Vincent Cassel and John Lithgow as Monsieur Hood and Lord Farquaad respectively in the Shrek 2 tie-in video game and Shrek Smash n' Crash Racing (2006). Starting with the 2015–2018 Netflix series The Adventures of Puss in Boots, Eric Bauza took over as the main replacement artist for the character from Sogliuzzo, who did voice a few characters in the show's first season. Piotr Michael later replaced him as Farquaad in the 2023 video game DreamWorks All Star Kart Racing.

In 2003, Sogliuzzo was hired by Robert Zemeckis to voice act in his motion capture animated film The Polar Express. Sogliuzzo replaced Michael Jeter as Smokey and Steamer after Jeter died one year prior to the film's release. For the part, Sogliuzzo recorded all of the remaining dialogue and redubbed most of Jeter's recorded audio for consistency. Sogliuzzo also voiced the characters in the film's tie-in video game later that year.

In 2006, Sogliuzzo voiced Tony Montana in the video game Scarface: The World Is Yours, a sequel to the 1983 film Scarface. Al Pacino, who originally portrayed Montana, declined to reprise his role outside of providing his likeness due to feeling his voice changed too much in the 23 years between the film and the game and subsequently handpicked Sogliuzzo for the role. Sogliuzzo would later reprise the role as Montana in a DLC package for the 2013 video game Payday 2.

Sogliuzzo has also voiced various characters for Activision, such as Sparx in the Spyro series starting in 2000, Camo and Voodood for the Skylanders series between 2011 and 2016, and Big Norm, Velo, and Zem in the 2019 game Crash Team Racing Nitro-Fueled.

== Filmography ==
=== Film ===
Year	Title	Role	Notes
1994	Iron Will	Man on Wagon	Uncredited
1996	Looking for Richard	Messenger	
1998	You've Got Mail	Waiter	
2002	Bubba Ho-Tep	Narrator	Uncredited
2004	The Polar Express	Smokey, Steamer	
2008	The Express: The Ernie Davis Story	John F. Kennedy	Uncredited
2009	Transformers: Revenge of the Fallen	Sideswipe	
2009	Public Enemies	Theater Announcer	Uncredited
2010	Gnomes and Trolls: The Secret Chamber	Fassa	
2010	Cats & Dogs: The Revenge of Kitty Galore	Snobby K-9	
2011	Open Season 3	McSquizzy	
2014	Pawn Sacrifice	Henry Kissinger	Uncredited
2015	Yellowbird	Various voices	English dub
2015	Justice League: Gods and Monsters	Cop	Direct-to-video
2019	Missing Link	New Worlder	
2019	Lego DC Batman: Family Matters	Riddler	Direct-to-video
2020	Mank	Newsreel Interviewer	Uncredited
2021	Tom and Jerry	Jerry	

=== Television ===
Year	Title	Role	Notes
1999–2002	Celebrity Deathmatch	Various voices	28 episodes
2000	Courage the Cowardly Dog	Bushwick	Episode: "Courage in the Big Stinkin' City"
2001	Samurai Jack	Stitches, Taxi Driver	Episode: "Jack and the Gangsters"
2001–2002	Jackie Chan Adventures	Hsi Wu, Seymore, Dai Gui, Monk	6 episodes
2001–2002	Invader Zim	Various voices	3 episodes
2002	Justice League	SWAT Officer	Episode: "The Brave and the Bold"
2003	Harvey Birdman, Attorney at Law	Avenger, Dynomutt, Pope, Co-Worker	2 episodes
2003	Whatever Happened to... Robot Jones?	Nuts, Stephen	Episode: "Work"
2003	Stuart Little	Monty	13 episodes
2003	SpongeBob SquarePants	Stunt Gorilla	Episode: "I Had an Accident"
2003–2005	Star Wars: Clone Wars	Various voices	18 episodes
2004–2006	Brandy & Mr. Whiskers	Gaspar Le Gecko	25 episodes
2005	The Batman	Duncan	Episode: "The Butler Did It"
2005–2008	Avatar: The Last Airbender	Hakoda, Bumi, Dai Li Captain, Earthbender Captain	13 episodes
2005–2016	Family Guy	Various voices	8 episodes
2005–2023	American Dad!	Various voices	28 episodes
2007	Random! Cartoons	Yaki	Episode: "Yaki & Yumi"
2008	Wolverine and the X-Men	Arclight	2 episodes
2009	The Cleveland Show	Robert Redford	Episode: "Birth of a Salesman"
2010–2011	G.I. Joe: Renegades	Major Bludd, Store Manager	2 episodes
2012	Kung Fu Panda: Legends of Awesomeness	Tai Lung	Episode: "The Master and the Panda"
2012	Bravest Warriors	Chamsy	2 episodes
2012–2013	Winx Club	King Radius, Magic Mirror, Courtier	7 episodes
2014	Cosmos: A Spacetime Odyssey	Christopher Wren, Weichelberger	2 episodes
2015	The Adventures of Puss in Boots	Various voices	4 episodes
2015–2017	Harvey Beaks	Jean Luc, various voices	13 episodes
2016	Transformers: Robots in Disguise	Clawtrap	5 episodes
2016	Avengers Assemble	Igor Drenkov	Episode: "Dehulked"
2016–2017	Star Wars Rebels	Captain Slavin, Stormtroopers	2 episodes
2016–2020	Elena of Avalor	Alkazar, King Verago, additional voices	7 episodes
2018	Lego Star Wars: All Stars	Cassian Andor	Episode: "From Trenches to Wrenches: The Roger Story"
2019	Love, Death & Robots	Pearly	Episode: "The Dump"
2020	The Owl House	Piniet	Episode: "Sense and Insensitivity"
2020	The Mighty Ones	Ants	Episode: "The Queen"
2021	Little Ellen	Mr. Macaw	Episode: "Fine and Feathered Friends"
2022–2023	Eureka!	Link	8 episodes
2023–2024	My Adventures with Superman	Monsieur Mallah	3 episodes
2024	Dead Boy Detectives	Grey Cat	4 episodes
2024	Sausage Party: Foodtopia	Christopher "Chris" Bologna, Melon Gibson, Dumpling	Voice
2026	Stuart Fails to Save the Universe	The Adversary	3 episodes

=== Video games ===
Year	Title	Role	Notes
1994	Kurokishi no Kamen	Rednech Chief, Electric Guardian	
2000	Spyro: Year of the Dragon	Sparx	
2001	Final Fantasy X	Father Zuke	
2002	Command & Conquer: Renegade	Gunner	
2002	Pirates: The Legend of Black Kat	Duncan, Marcus Deleon	
2002	The Scorpion King: Rise of the Akkadian	Desert Hermit, Minoian Soldier, Dice Man	
2002	Star Wars: The Clone Wars	Cydon Prax, Clone Trooper	
2002	Spyro: Enter the Dragonfly	Sparx	
2002	No One Lives Forever 2: A Spy in H.A.R.M.'s Way	Magnus Armstrong	
2003	Star Wars: Knights of the Old Republic	Master Dorak	
2003	Crimson Skies: High Road to Revenge	Wally Bagadonuts, Cajun, Militia	
2003	Crash Nitro Kart	Norm, Zem	
2003	Freedom Fighters	Additional Voices	
2003	Spawn: Armageddon	Mammon	
2003	The Hobbit	Bard, Ugslap	
2003	Gladius	Urlan	
2003	Medal of Honor: Rising Sun	Donny Griffin	
2004	Shrek 2	Puss in Boots, Robin Hood, additional voices	
2004	Shark Tale	Tenant Fish	
2004	X-Men Legends	Morlock Thief, Sentinels	
2004	Tales of Symphonia	Forcystus	
2004	Call of Duty: United Offensive	Private Goldberg	
2004	Men of Valor	Harlen	
2004	Spyro: A Hero's Tail	Sparx	
2004	Vampire: The Masquerade – Bloodlines	Bruno Giovanni, Cab Driver, Mercurio, Victor Rossellini, Zhao	
2004	World of Warcraft	Allaris Narassin, Arluin, Vandros, Grumbol Grimhammer	
2004	The Polar Express	Smokey, Steamer	
2004	Star Wars Knights of the Old Republic II: The Sith Lords	Various voices	
2004	The Lord of the Rings: The Battle for Middle-earth	Orccs	
2005	Shrek: Totally Tangled Tales	Puss in Boots	
2005	Project Snowblind	Nathan Frost	
2005	Psychonauts	Fred, Napoleon Bonaparte	
2005	Madagascar	Various voices	
2005	Fantastic Four	Diablo	
2005	Destroy All Humans!	President Huffman, Farmer	
2005	Tak: The Great Juju Challenge	Bartog	
2005	Shrek SuperSlam	Puss in Boots, Robin Hood	
2005	Need for Speed: Most Wanted	Rog	
2005	Brave: The Search for Spirit Dancer	Hooded Crow, Eagle Spirit, Villagers	
2005	Age of Empires III	Napoleon	
2005	50 Cent: Bulletproof	Cop	
2005	Quake 4	Alejandro Cortez	
2005	F.E.A.R.	Delta Force	
2005	Ratchet: Deadlocked	Ace Hardlight	
2005	True Crime: New York City	Additional voices	
2006	The Lord of the Rings: The Battle for Middle-earth II	Orcs	
2006	Dreamfall: The Longest Journey	Blind Bob	
2006	Avatar: The Last Airbender	Bumi	
2006	Shrek Smash n' Crash Racing	Puss in Boots, Lord Farquaad	
2006	Scarface: The World Is Yours	Tony Montana	
2006	The Sopranos: Road to Respect	Anzallata Twins	
2006	Armored Core 4	Leonhardt, Borisovich, Squad Leader	
2007	Shrek the Third	Puss in Boots, various voices	
2007	Guild Wars: Eye of the North	Gadd, Torg, Egil	
2007	Avatar: The Last Airbender – The Burning Earth	Bumi, Kuei	
2007	Enemy Territory: Quake Wars	Technician	
2007	Kingdom Under Fire: Circle of Doom	Bertrand	
2008	Turning Point: Fall of Liberty	Weinberg	
2008	Condemned 2: Bloodshot	Ethan Thomas, Masked Man, Alcohol Demon	
2008	Avatar: The Last Airbender – Into the Inferno	Hakoda	
2008	Shrek's Carnival Craze	Puss in Boots, Robin Hood	
2008	Destroy All Humans! Path of the Furon	C. Curt Calvin	
2009	Eat Lead: The Return of Matt Hazard	Captain Carpenter, Employee Programmer	
2009	Night at the Museum: Battle of the Smithsonian	Al Capone, Benjamin Franklin	
2009	Brütal Legend	Ratguts	
2009	Ghostbusters: The Video Game	Additional voices	
2009	The Saboteur	Luc Gardin, Jules	
2009	Assassin's Creed II	Doctor	
2009	Final Fantasy XIII	Bartholomew Estheim	
2009	Avatar: The Game	Tan Jala	
2010	SOCOM U.S. Navy SEALs: Fireteam Bravo 3	Lonestar	
2010	Kingdom Hearts Birth by Sleep	Deep Space Patrol	
2010	Dead to Rights: Retribution	Various voices	
2010	Shrek Forever After	Puss in Boots	
2010	Alpha Protocol	Sean Darcy	
2010	Clash of the Titans	Draco, Ozai, Fisherman, Spirits	
2010	Mafia II	Luca Gurino, Carlo Falcone	
2010	Scooby-Doo! and the Spooky Swamp	Emilio Gonzalez	
2010	Assassin's Creed: Brotherhood	Doctor	
2011	Knights Contract	Heinrich Hoffman	
2011	Rango	Wounded Bird	
2011	Captain America: Super Soldier	Arnim Zola	
2011	X-Men: Destiny	Colossus, Luis Reyes	
2011	Battlefield 3	Dimitri Mayakovsky	
2011	The Elder Scrolls V: Skyrim	Khajiit (Male)	
2011	The Darkness II	Frank	
2011	Cars 2: The Video Game	Max Schnell	
2011	Kinect Sports: Season Two	Baseball Umpire	
2011	Puss in Boots	Puss in Boots	
2012	Kingdoms of Amalur: Reckoning	Various voices	
2012	Unit 13	Alabama	
2012	The Secret World	Various voices	
2012	Darksiders II	Karn, Mad Smith	
2012	Guild Wars 2	Eltok, Oliver, Ahai Tamini	
2012	Dishonored	Aristocat, Weeper	
2012	Skylanders: Giants	Camo, Voodood	
2013	Dead Island: Riptide	Dr. Kessler	
2013	The Smurfs 2	Gargamel	
2013	Payday 2	Scarface	
2013	Grand Theft Auto V	The Local Population	
2013	Skylanders: Swap Force	Camo, Voodood	
2014	Wolfenstein: The New Order	Demon	
2014	WildStar	Mordesh, Falkrin, Loop	
2014	Teenage Mutant Ninja Turtles: Brothers Unite	Bebop, Leatherhead, Purple Dragon Thug	
2014	Teenage Mutant Ninja Turtles	Slash	
2014	The Legend of Korra	Triad, Chi Blocker, Pro Bender	
2014	Lego Ninjago: Nindroids	Sensei Garmadon, Cyrus Borg	
2014	Skylanders: Trap Team	Camo, Voodood	
2015	Heroes of the Storm	Zul'jin	
2015	Batman: Arkham Knight	Firefighters, Thugs	
2015	Skylanders: SuperChargers	Camo	
2015	Transformers: Devastation	Scavenger, Thundercracker, Seeker	
2015	Kung Fu Panda: Showdown of Legendary Legends	Lord Shen	
2015–2017	Lego Dimensions	Sensei Garmadon, Munchkin Mayor, Bezar, Vigo the Carpathian, Joker (The Lego Batman Movie version)	
2016	Fragments of Him	Harry (Prototype)	
2016	Lego Star Wars: The Force Awakens	Mi'no Teest	
2016	Skylanders: Imaginators	Camo, Voodood	
2017	Dreamfall Chapters	Blind Bob	
2017	Agents of Mayhem	Enzo Garibaldi, Tako-san, Scandal Bouncer	
2018	State of Decay 2	Zombies	
2018	Spyro Reignited Trilogy	Sparx	
2018	Call of Duty: Black Ops 4	Pvt. Goldberg	
2019	Metro Exodus	Baron	
2019	Sekiro: Shadows Die Twice	Isshin Asina	
2019	Rage 2	Shrouded Assault	
2019	Crash Team Racing Nitro-Fueled	Big Norm, Velo, Zem	
2020	Doom Eternal	Father	
2020	Final Fantasy VII Remake	Wymer	
2020	Star Wars: Squadrons	TIE Pilot	
2021	Back 4 Blood	Jim	
2022	Star Ocean: The Divine Force	Vahnel Thoran	
2022	Tactics Ogre: Reborn	Mirdyn Walhorn	
2023	Diablo IV	Creatures	
2023	Hellboy Web of Wyrd	Trevor Bruttenholm, Altman, Faithless King	
2023	Teenage Mutant Ninja Turtles: Splintered Fate	Slash	
2024	Persona 3 Reload	Bunkichi Kitamura	
2024	Indiana Jones and the Great Circle	Ernesto	
2025	Dune: Awakening	Keif Villari	

=== Theme parks ===
- Seven Dwarfs Mine Train – Doc
