= Spyro: A Realm Beyond =

- Developer: Toys for Bob
- Publisher: Activision
- Series: Spyro
- Engine: Unreal Engine 5
- Platforms: Nintendo Switch 2; PlayStation 5; Windows; Xbox Series X/S
- Release: Spring 2027
- Genre: Platformer
- Mode: Single-player

Spyro: A Realm Beyond is an upcoming platform video game developed by Toys for Bob and published by Activision. The ninth mainline entry in the series and the sixth in its classic continuity, it is the first Spyro game released since Spyro Reignited Trilogy (2018) and the first completely original Spyro game since The Legend of Spyro: Dawn of the Dragon (2008). It is scheduled for release in Spring 2027 for Nintendo Switch 2, PlayStation 5, Windows, and Xbox Series X/S.

== Gameplay ==
Spyro: A Realm Beyond places a greater emphasis on exploration and aerial movement than previous entries in the series. The game introduces free-flight mechanics, allowing players to fly across the game world instead of being restricted to levels. Players can combine dives, climbs, and turns while exploring interconnected environments.

== Premise ==
Spyro: A Realm Beyond follows Spyro after he becomes stranded in a mysterious realm. While searching for a way to return home, he encounters an invading force known as the Scavs. During his journey, Spyro forms alliances with the realm's inhabitants and becomes involved in efforts to defend the realm from the invasion.

== Development ==
Spyro: A Realm Beyond is being developed by Toys for Bob, the studio previously responsible for Spyro Reignited Trilogy (2018). In October 2023, following Microsoft's acquisition of Activision Blizzard, the Toys for Bob studio and the Spyro intellectual property became owned by Xbox. In February 2024, Toys for Bob announced that it would become an independent studio, separating from Activision and Xbox. Studio leaders Paul Yan and Avery Lodato stated that the move would allow the company to return to its roots as a smaller and more agile developer. The studio indicated that it expected to maintain a working relationship with Microsoft in the future. In May 2024, Toys for Bob announced a publishing partnership with Xbox for its next game, though the project was still in the early stages of development. In April 2025, Yan described the game as "big and ambitious", and noted that development was progressing well. Toys for Bob admitted that the "loud and consistent" fan community around the Spyro Reignited Trilogy prompted them to return to Spyro with Spyro: A Realm Beyond. During development, the studio paid mind to potential scope creep to keep the game within budgetary and time constraints. It is being built in Unreal Engine 5. Tom Kenny, who first voiced Spyro in Spyro 2: Ripto's Rage! (1999), will reprise his role for the game.

=== Gameplay design ===
With Spyro: A Realm Beyond, Toys for Bob wanted to evolve the gameplay from what they did on the Spyro Reignited Trilogy with a greater focus on movement. Studio head Paul Yan mentioned the difficulty of gameplay innovation, stating that "if you stick too much to nostalgia, then you basically just rehash" but if "you innovate too much, [...] you don't even recognize what the character is and what the series is." Yan further stated that A Realm Beyond's goal is to reinvigorate the series, hoping that the game would be "the first of many" new titles. The free flight mechanic became the first focus in the prototyping stage and became the central feature that influenced the game design. Yan described it as a "natural way" to progress and build off of the Reignited Trilogy. The first Spyro game where the player can take flight at any time, creative director Lou Studdert said the studio were "leaning into the true capabilities of being a dragon" in Spyro: A Realm Beyond. The player has to actively flap Spyro's wings to maintain flight with the ability to dive downwards to gain speed and use campfires as an updraft to gain height. With the flight system, Yan emphasized that Toys for Bob wanted to ensure that A Realm Beyond did not become a "flight simulator" and instead wanted to encourage a sense of "active decision-making" in guiding Spyro like with platforming.

=== Music ===
Stewart Copeland, the composer for the original trilogy and Spyro: Enter the Dragonfly, stated that he was not working on A Realm Beyond.

== Release ==
Spyro: A Realm Beyond was announced on June 7, 2026, during the Xbox Games Showcase. The trailer received over 10 million views in two days, surpassing Marvel's Wolverine trailer shown during the same presentation. The game is scheduled for release in early 2027 for Nintendo Switch 2, PlayStation 5, Windows, and Xbox Series X/S. It will be available through Xbox Game Pass at launch and will support Play Anywhere cross-progression on Xbox and Windows.
