= Spyro 2: Season of Flame =

2002 video game

- North American box art
- Developer: Digital Eclipse
- Publisher: Universal Interactive
- Director: Michael Mika Sr.
- Producer: Trent Ward
- Programmer: Pierre-Luc Tardif
- Artist: Ryan Slemko
- Composers: Robert Baffy; Ed Cosico
- Series: Spyro
- Platform: Game Boy Advance
- Release: NA: September 24, 2002; EU: October 25, 2002; AU: November 6, 2002
- Genres: Platform, action-adventure
- Mode: Single-player

Spyro 2: Season of Flame is a 2002 platform game developed by Digital Eclipse and published by Universal Interactive for the Game Boy Advance. It is the fifth installment in the Spyro video game series and a sequel to Spyro: Season of Ice. The game's story centers on the abduction of the Dragon Realm's fireflies at the hands of the Rhynocs, causing the dragons to lose their ability to breathe fire. The protagonist of the story, Spyro the Dragon, must recover the fireflies and uncover the culprit behind the firefly theft.

The game received generally favorable reviews from critics, many of whom considered the game to be superior to Spyro: Season of Ice, though the game was criticized for its "tricky" controls.

== Gameplay ==
Spyro demonstrates the ability to breathe a blast of ice-cold air

The player controls Spyro the Dragon, who must travel through the Dragon Realms and recover the stolen fireflies. Fireflies can be found in many places, either scurrying around in wide-open spaces or hidden behind obstacles. Fireflies can sometimes be received as rewards for performing tasks for the citizens of the Dragon Realms. Once found, the fireflies can be frozen in place by Spyro's ice breath, allowing Spyro to collect them.

In the Dragon Realms, Spyro can access various other levels by walking through Portals. Entering a Portal will transport Spyro to a world where he will meet creatures that are troubled by the invading Rhynocs. When Spyro helps these creatures, a Portal that leads out of that world will appear, allowing Spyro to return to the Dragon Realms. Some Portals can only be accessed after a certain number of fireflies have been rescued.

At the beginning of the game, Spyro has the ability to breathe freezing cold air to freeze enemies and fireflies, charge to penetrate armoured enemies and containers, glide through the air and hover at the end of his flight to gain more hang time. By rescuing a certain number of fireflies, Spyro can regain the ability to breathe fire, and may still use his ice breath thanks to the select button. Spyro can later gain the ability to headbutt and break rock formations and barriers. During the game, Spyro can also use special gates to temporarily increase the range of his fire breath, increase the potency of his ice breath or gain the ability to breathe electricity to recharge electric generators.

The main collectible item is gems, which are scattered everywhere throughout the game. Some gems are hidden in baskets and vases. To obtain these gems, Spyro must use his flame or charge to break open the containers. Gems are used to buy the various services of the character Moneybags.

Sparx, the dragonfly that follows Spyro, acts as Spyro's health meter. Spyro begins the game with four hit points and four lives. Spyro can be harmed four times before he loses a life. Each time Spyro loses a hit point, Sparx changes color accordingly. When Spyro loses three of his four hit points, Sparx disappears. Spyro can restore hit points by feeding Sparx butterflies, which can be obtained by killing small animals such as rabbits and sheep. Occasionally, a special butterfly can be found that can give Spyro an extra life. Sparx can also give advice on how to accomplish particular challenges and hints on how to perform certain tasks. The ability to receive advice from Sparx can be toggled on and off from the pause menu.

During certain parts of the game, the player's control will switch to either Agent 9 the Monkey or Sheila the Kangaroo. Agent 9 is speedier and more agile than Spyro and is equipped with a laser gun with limited ammunition. Special rooms in which Agent 9 can restock on ammunition can be found throughout the levels in which he is controlled. Sheila can jump higher than Spyro and is equipped with a powerful kick to fend off enemies. When all of the gems and fireflies in the game are collected, a minigame in which Sparx is the player character is made accessible.

== Plot ==
After the events of Spyro: Season of Ice, Spyro returns to the Dragon Realms and learns an army of Rhynocs infiltrated the Dragon Realms and stole all of its fireflies during Spyro's absence. Without the magic of the fireflies, the dragons cannot breathe fire; their breath, including Spyro's, has been turned icy cold. As a result, the temperatures of the Dragon Realms begin to drop, which threatens to force the dragons to migrate. Spyro, Sparx, Bianca and Hunter set out to uncover the culprit behind the stolen fireflies. Later in the game, a fairy informs the trio that Ripto was the one that stole the fireflies. So the trio set out to stop him. Along the way, They fight Crush and Gulp, Ripto's minions. After crossing more levels they face Ripto in a volcano and defeat him. When he is defeated, the fireflies fly out to warm Up the Dragon Realms.

== Development ==
The music and sound effects were created by Robert Baffy, with Ed Cosico composing additional music. The game was announced by Universal Interactive on February 19, 2002.

== Reception ==
Reception

Aggregate score
| Aggregator | Score |
|---|---|
| Metacritic | 76/100 |

Review scores
| Publication | Score |
|---|---|
| AllGame | 3/5 |
| Eurogamer | 5/10 |
| Game Informer | 7.5/10 |
| GamePro | 4/5 |
| GameSpot | 8/10 |
| GameSpy | 4.5/5 |
| GameZone | 8.6/10 |
| IGN | 8.5/10 |
| Nintendo Power | 2.8/5 |
| Nintendo World Report | 8/10 |

Season of Flame received generally favorable reviews according to the review aggregation website Metacritic. Steve Steinberg of GameSpy praised the game's "challenging and varied gameplay" and "colorful graphics". Anise Hollingshead of GameZone, while criticizing the game's short length and the "sameness" of the minigames, said that it is "a great game for everyone in the family". Craig Harris of IGN and Frank Provo of GameSpot declared that the game was superior to its predecessor in a number of areas. Four-Eyed Dragon of GamePro cited the "tricky controls" as the only negative point of the game, saying that "the digital directional pad doesn't allow for smooth diagonal movement, which Spyro does a lot in each world." Ben Kosmina of Nintendo World Report also found fault in the controls, stating that they have not improved from Spyro: Season of Ice and that it is "still incredibly awkward trying to control him while gliding, as he'll go zooming off all over the place with the slightest touch." Game Informer, while concluding that exploring the worlds was enjoyable, said that "the jumping portions of the game are still a little iffy, and I killed myself quite a lot from misreading the view". Scott Alan Marriott of AllGame ("All Game Guide" at the time) cited that the graphics, humor and puzzles were "engaging enough to warrant a purchase for devotees of the purple dragon", but added that the game would benefit from better controls and more varied objectives. Nintendo Power noted that the game was presented in the same style and shown from the same isometric perspective as Spyro: Season of Ice. Martin Taylor of Eurogamer cited "boredom" as the game's major flaw, saying that nothing in the game "really makes you want to carry on the story through to its end because none of it is particularly fun."

The game sold 670,000 units in the U.S. and earned $15 million by August 2006. During the period between January 2000 and August 2006, it was the 39th highest-selling game launched for the Game Boy Advance, Nintendo DS or PlayStation Portable in that country.
