= Spyro: Season of Ice =

2001 video game

- North American box art
- Developer: Digital Eclipse
- Publisher: Universal Interactive Studios
- Series: Spyro
- Platform: Game Boy Advance
- Release: NA: November 7, 2001; EU: November 16, 2001
- Genre: Platform
- Mode: Single-player

Spyro: Season of Ice is a 2001 platform game developed by Digital Eclipse and published by Universal Interactive Studios for the Game Boy Advance. It acts as an alternate sequel to the first three games along with Spyro 2: Season of Flame and Spyro: Attack of the Rhynocs.

== Gameplay ==
The objective of the game is to release fairies from their ice prisons and to progress from realm to realm before defeating Grendor. Spyro starts off in the Autumn Fairy Home one of the four seasonal fairy realms in the game. In each realm, gems can be collected, critters like sheep can be destroyed for healing butterflies (and some to grant extra lives), special objects (like pumpkins) can be ignited, baskets can be broken for more gems and Bianca and Hunter in various spots can give hints. Spyro can never die in the seasonal realms, with the fairy magic force protecting him from drowning in the water and no enemies present. The realms link to several places via portals. To access them, a number of fairies have to be procured, indicated next to the level name.

Some of the portals will go to levels which are similar in gameplay to the realms except they have enemies to destroy, dangerous territory that harms Spyro, water which Spyro can drown in and special encounters. There are always characters to talk with. One or two characters in a level will asks a request to do something in exchange for a fairy (often referring it to something other than a fairy like a diamond gem). In some levels, Spyro can catch thieves, which can be tricky to do. When all enemies are destroyed, a portal appears and will take Spyro back to the seasonal realm he came from.

Some of the portals will go to a long stretching horizon landscape in which Spyro flies across. The game can be played in Normal and Hard modes, but both will have to be played and won to obtain two fairies. The object of these levels is to move around the screen, flying through hoops, destroying lines of enemies and scattered enemies in a set time limit. Destroying enemies with a different colour from the latter and going through hoops grants Spyro extra time. At the end of level, Spyro must face a boss or two and destroy them.

Some of the portals, Spyro cannot go through with Money Bags guarding them, but Money Bags will allow Sparx to enter for a fee. The fee is only paid once. Sparx enters a level with killer bugs and insects. Destroying the nests of those bugs prevents them from spawning. Keys will enable Sparx to access more of the level. Electric panels can be destroyed to disable barriers that protect certain nests. Weapons can be procured to give Sparx limited increased firepower. At the last room of the level, Sparx will have to face and defeat the boss bug to open a portal back to Spyro and save a fairy.

Spyro is required to defeat Grendor twice, the first time to progress after the first two seasonal realms and the second time after the other two seasonal realms to win the game. If the player collects 100% of all the gems and fairies from all levels and realms, a new portal opens to play the extra game "Dragonfly X".

== Plot ==
Spyro and Sparx are on holiday with Bianca and Hunter, when Hunter panics mistaking a balloon for a sheep in a flying saucer. Spyro finds on the balloon a message from Zoe asking for help from Grendor who is kidnapping fairies. Bianca left her spellbook behind in the library while she was looking for holiday pamphlets. Grendor had been browsing in Bianca's library and came across Bianca's spellbook. He tried it out, hoping to become a powerful magician, however, he read it upside down and became a two-headed Rhynoc with 4 headaches. He planned to capture all the fairies and use their wings to make a cure for his problem. Spyro and his friends head off to stop Grendor from carrying out his plans.

After Spyro traverses many levels (including a first confrontation with Grendor) and saves all the fairies besides Zoe herself, he confronts Grendor for a second time and defeats again, rescuing Zoe. Once free, Zoe lightly chastises Grendor for causing trouble, then uses her magic to cure him of his extra head and all his headaches. Grendor apologizes for his actions, and Spyro and his friends return to their vacation.

== Reception ==
Reception

Aggregate score
Aggregator	Score
Metacritic	74/100

Review scores
Publication	Score
AllGame	2.5/5
EP Daily	7.5/10
GamePro	15/20
GameSpot	7.5/10
GameSpy	84/100
GameZone	8/10
Hyper	79/100
IGN	8/10
M! Games	74%
NGamer	82/100
Official Nintendo Magazine	80%

Season of Ice received "mixed or average" reviews, according to review aggregator Metacritic.

In the United States, Season of Ice sold 1 million copies and earned $29 million by August 2006. During the period between January 2000 and August 2006, it was the 13th highest-selling game launched for the Game Boy Advance, Nintendo DS or PlayStation Portable in that country.

=== Retrospective reviews ===
Describing the game as "highly entertaining" after several decades, Marie Pritchard of Eurogamer praised exploring the environments of Season of Ice, citing the "huge variety of environments to explore" and "exciting places for you poke around in". Bobby Mills of TheGamer said the game was a fun adventure game for a budget title that "achieves what it sets out to do". Ewan Lewis of TheGamer wrote that Season of Ice was a fun game, but one of the most difficult games in the Spyro series due to "questionable design choices", such as the difficulty of aligning landings in the isometric view.
