= Spyro (character) =

Video game character

- Spyro character
- Spyro as he appears in the Reignited Trilogy
- First appearance: Spyro the Dragon (1998)
- Created by: Craig Stitt
- Designed by: Charles Zembillas
- Voiced by: English: Carlos Alazraqui (1998); Tom Kenny (1999–2002, 2018-present); Jess Harnell (2004); Elijah Wood (2006–2008); Josh Keaton (2011–2015); Matthew Mercer (2016); Justin Long (2016–2018); Jason Ritter (Dark Spyro, 2016–2018); Japanese: Akiko Yajima (1999–2000); Manabu Ino (2013–present); Masahito Kawanago (2016–2018)

In-universe information
- Species: European dragon
- Home: Artisans

Spyro is the titular protagonist of the video game series of the same name, including The Legend of Spyro, and a guest character in the Skylanders series, first appearing in Spyro the Dragon in 1998.

Spyro is depicted as a young, energetic, and adventurous male purple dragon, and he is distinguished by his signature abilities, which include breathing fire, charging at enemies with his horns, and using his wings to glide across otherwise inaccessible areas. Throughout his adventures, Spyro is commonly accompanied by his loyal companion Sparx, a dragonfly who serves both as his health indicator and supportive ally.

The character was conceived by artist Craig Stitt and designed by Charles Zembillas for Insomniac Games, the studio responsible for developing the original Spyro trilogy between 1998 and 2000.

Spyro quickly became one of the most recognizable video game mascots, and is widely regarded as a counterpart to Crash Bandicoot, another PlayStation-era icon. Both characters were originally owned by Universal Studios under its video game division, Universal Interactive. Following the merger of Vivendi Games with Activision in 2008, the franchise became the property of Activision Blizzard.

== Development ==
After developing Disruptor, Insomniac president, Ted Price, contacted Zembillas to design a playable dragon character for a video game. Zembillas had previously designed Crash for Naughty Dog, whose offices were just across the hall from Insomniac's at Universal Interactive Studios.

Spyro was originally named "Pete" and colored green during development, but the name was dropped to avoid infringing on the trademark Pete's Dragon, which was owned by The Walt Disney Company. His color was changed to purple so as to avoid blending in with any grassy areas. He was made younger to appeal to children, needing "to be cute, but at the same time, mischievous, bratty, unpredictable, and something of an upstart."

Spyro was given the ability to glide infinitely to give him "something he could do that no other platformer could", making the game's worlds significantly larger and providing more incentive for exploration. According to programmer Peter Hastings, NASA rocket scientist Matt Whiting was hired to program Spyro's controls so that he could move as smoothly as possible.

Price claimed in an interview that Insomniac stopped developing Spyro games after Spyro: Year of the Dragon because Spyro didn't have hands and therefore his actions were limited.

=== Voice portrayal ===
Spyro was originally voiced by Carlos Alazraqui in Spyro the Dragon. Alazraqui explained in an interview with Electronic Gaming Monthly that he tried to make Spyro's voice sound like "a kid at camp that everybody likes." He was later replaced by Tom Kenny for the following three games, from 1999's Spyro 2: Ripto's Rage! to 2002's Spyro: Enter the Dragonfly. In later years, he was voiced by Jess Harnell in Spyro: A Hero's Tail; Elijah Wood in The Legend of Spyro series; Josh Keaton in the first five Skylanders games; and Matthew Mercer in Skylanders: Imaginators. For the release of the Spyro Reignited Trilogy, Kenny was brought back to reprise the role, and has continued to voice the character in all subsequent appearances.

In the television series Skylanders Academy, he was voiced by Justin Long. As Dark Spyro, he was voiced by Jason Ritter.

In the Japanese versions of the games, he was voiced by Akiko Yajima, Manabu Ino, and Masahito Kawanago.

== Characteristics ==
Spyro is depicted as a spirited, courageous, and witty young dragon with a heroic sense of duty and penchant for humor and sarcasm. His confidence sometimes borders on recklessness, but he consistently prioritizes his responsibilities, is resilient in the face of setbacks, and is eager to learn and grow, all while maintaining a playful and sociable demeanor. In The Legend of Spyro, which takes place in a different continuity, Spyro was raised by dragonflies alongside Sparx after his egg was lost during an attempt to destroy his brood. He comes from a rare line of purple dragons, who are able to physically harness the power of the four classical elements. Here, Spyro is described as willing to help his friends and strangers with whatever problems they may have, without desire for reward. Spyro is adventurous, curious about his past, and eager to shape his future, in which he is expected to become something of a chieftain. Spyro also has an evil alter ego known as "Dark Spyro", who is stoic, ruthless, and animalistic, and manifests when Spyro is consumed by the "Dark Aether", a force born from negative energies. In the Skylanders franchise, Spyro is described as strong-willed and young at heart, but has a headstrong and arrogant attitude. Much as in The Legend of Spyro, he comes from a rare line of purple dragons in a faraway land few have ever traveled, and his adventures and heroics were chronicled by the "Portal Masters of Old". He was eventually invited to join the Skylanders by Master Eon and now lives in Skylands, remaining as one of its most valued protectors. Spyro can also become Dark Spyro in Skylanders; this incarnation is in better control of himself and uses the darkness to fight evil, but is always at risk of being consumed by it.

In most Spyro games, Spyro's main attacks consist of charging with his horns or breathing fire to defeat enemies and destroy treasure chests. Spyro can use his wings to glide, though he needs to utilize certain powerups to be able to fly freely. Spyro can also use powerups that allow him to charge at high speeds and enhance his fire breath, as well as breathe ice, jump to higher places, and become invincible. In Ripto's Rage!, Spyro learns new abilities from Moneybags in exchange for treasure. These include the ability to swim underwater, where Spyro can charge at enemies, but can only blow bubbles instead of fire. He also learns to climb up certain walls using his claws, and a maneuver called the "headbash", wherein Spyro dives straight downward with his horns. Spyro retains these abilities in later games. In Spyro: Enter the Dragonfly, in addition to his fire breath, Spyro can collect magic runes that allow him to breathe lightning, ice, and bubbles that he can use to catch lost baby dragonflies. In A Hero's Tail, Spyro rescues fairies that grant him the power to breathe lightning, water, and ice. In The Legend of Spyro, Spyro can breathe and manipulate fire, ice, electricity, and earth. Once he learns to use all four elements, he can use a fifth energy-based element known as "Aether", which only purple dragons can use. In The Legend of Spyro: The Eternal Night, Spyro acquires the "Dragon Time" ability, which allows him to slow down time. In the same game, he is also playable as Dark Spyro when consumed by Dark Aether. Spyro can fly infinitely in The Legend of Spyro: Dawn of the Dragon, having become a teenager. In Skylanders, Spyro has the ability to control all of the elements of the world of Skylands but prefers to use fire. He can harness nearby darkness, allowing him to become Dark Spyro.

== Other media ==
Spyro appears in Spyro Orange: The Cortex Conspiracy and Crash Bandicoot Purple: Ripto's Rampage, where he meets Crash Bandicoot and teams up with him to defeat Ripto and Doctor Neo Cortex, who are trying to take over both of their worlds. Spyro also appears as an unlockable character in the Game Boy Advance version of Crash Nitro Kart, and makes cameo appearances in Crash Twinsanity, Astro's Playroom, and Astro Bot. Additionally, he makes a playable guest appearance in Crash Team Racing Nitro-Fueled as post-launch downloadable content.

Spyro also appeared as a playable character in Crash Team Rumble, along with Elora and Ripto.

Spyro appears briefly in a commercial for Ty the Tasmanian Tiger alongside Crash and Sonic the Hedgehog. All three are in full body casts in the hospital with boomerangs in their bodies, apparently having been put there by Ty.

Spyro also appears in novels and certain issues of the Skylanders comic book series by IDW Publishing; including his own mini comic series, Spyro & Friends. Furthermore, he is the main protagonist in the animated streaming television series, Skylanders Academy.

=== Merchandise ===
Handheld LCD games, themed after Spyro as well as Crash Bandicoot, were packaged in McDonald's Mighty Kids Meals in 2005 to promote A Hero's Tail and Crash Twinsanity. The Legend of Spyro-themed toys were packaged with Wendy's Kids' Meals in 2007 to promote The Eternal Night. Spyro was one of three toy figures to be included in the starter pack for Skylanders Spyro's Adventure, and received new figures in its sequels. Spyro has also appeared in Skylanders-themed plush toys and MEGA Bloks sets.

Spyro-themed figures were released in 2018 by First4Figures and Activision to promote Reignited Trilogy. Merchandise related to the Spyro franchise were released by Numskull alongside the game's launch.

== Reception and legacy ==
GameRevolution criticized Spyro's voice in Spyro the Dragon, comparing it negatively to the Taco Bell chihuahua, who was also voiced by Carlos Alazraqui. IGN praised Spyro's design, saying he is "cute but not sickeningly cute", later criticizing him as "just a little bland, and not the kind of mascot that I would ever fall in love with... he's kind of like a blend between a big puppy and a donkey, painted purple." UGO.com listed Spyro on their list of "The Cutest Video Game Characters", stating "The purple little guy was cute, but not cute enough to win the Great Playstation Mascot War of 1998." The 2011 Guinness World Records Gamer's Edition lists Spyro as the 39th most popular video game character. In 2012, GamesRadar ranked Spyro, "one of the most relatable mythological creatures of all time", as the 92nd "most memorable, influential, and badass" protagonist in games. In the same year, he was ranked 9th in Complex's "The 25 Most Kickass Dragons in Video Games" list, with writer Obi Anyawu stating Spyro "is truly an original just from his size and color alone." Ravi Sinha of GamingBolt named Spyro on his appearance at Skylanders as 2nd of their "Worst Video Game Character Design", stating that "Cute, innocent, fire-breathing Spyro didn't deserve his terrible redesign. Beloved by many old-school PlayStation fans, Spyro was brought into Skylanders with much fanfare. His actual design seemed intended to make him more…dragon-like? Instead, it made Spyro look borderline frightening yet still goofy as opposed to, you know, a hero." HobbyConsolas also included Spyro on their "The 30 best heroes of the last 30 years."
