= Crash Bandicoot Purple and Spyro Orange =

Crash Bandicoot Purple: Ripto's Rampage; Spyro Orange: The Cortex Conspiracy
- Cover art of both games
- Developer: Vicarious Visions
- Publisher: Vivendi Universal Games (Note: Released under the Coktel brand in PAL regions.)
- Director: Kathy Carter
- Producer: Caroline Trujillo
- Designers: Jonathan Russell; Colin Wilkinson
- Programmers: Sunbir Gill; Jan-Erik Steel; Eric Caraszi
- Artists: Brent Gibson; Chongguang Zhang; Robyn Poirier; Jason Harlow
- Composer: Shin'en Multimedia
- Series: Crash Bandicoot; Spyro
- Platform: Game Boy Advance
- Release: NA: June 1, 2004; EU: June 25, 2004
- Genres: Action, platform
- Modes: Single-player, multiplayer

Crash Bandicoot Purple: Ripto's Rampage and Spyro Orange: The Cortex Conspiracy (released as Crash Bandicoot: Fusion and Spyro: Fusion in Europe) are two 2004 action games developed by Vicarious Visions and published by Vivendi Universal Games for the Game Boy Advance. The games are a crossover between the Crash Bandicoot and Spyro series, and are the fourth installments of each series made for the GBA. The story follows Crash Bandicoot and Spyro the Dragon as they team up and set out to thwart the alliance of their respective enemies Doctor Neo Cortex and Ripto. In a departure from the series' usual format, the gameplay of both titles is based heavily on minigames.

The crossover was proposed by Vivendi Universal, driven by the concept of bringing the two characters together for the first time. Crash Purple and Spyro Orange were respectively Vicarious Visions' fourth and first Crash and Spyro title, and were built on the largest cartridges the company had yet worked with. The games received mixed reviews upon release. Crash Purple was generally regarded as the stronger title due to its more varied and challenging minigames, though it was faulted for weak platforming, short length, and a lackluster trading card system. Spyro Orange was seen as a weaker, less engaging game, with less varied minigames, simplistic platforming, and a lack of difficulty.

== Gameplay ==
The gameplay of Crash Bandicoot Purple and Spyro Orange is divided between a series of minigames (example from Crash Purple shown at top) and platforming segments (example from Spyro Orange shown at bottom).

Crash Bandicoot Purple and Spyro Orange are side-scrolling action games with a heavy emphasis on minigames. This format is a departure from the isometric view of prior Spyro games released for the Game Boy Advance (GBA). The player navigates Crash Bandicoot (in Crash Purple) or Spyro the Dragon (in Spyro Orange) through five hub worlds, each with two main levels. Crash can jump, double-jump, and use a spin attack to defeat enemies and collect Wumpa fruit, while Spyro can jump, double-jump, float briefly, and use a fire-breath attack to defeat enemies and collect gems. Levels include basic platforming elements like avoiding obstacles and finding hidden items.

The core gameplay revolves around minigames accessed via portals. In Crash Purple, players use collected Wumpa fruit to unlock these portals, earning Power Crystals for completion and Clear Gems for breaking all crates within time limits or forced-scrolling challenges, while in Spyro Orange, minigame portals are unlocked with collected gems. Unlocked minigames are playable in a multiplayer "Party Mode" (single or multi-cartridge) for up to four players. Completing all the minigames in a world unlocks a boss fight, often a harder version of a previous minigame. The final world requires collecting all the Clear Gems in Crash Purple or completing each minigame three times in Spyro Orange to access. Players can collect a total of 167 trading cards across both games by finding them in levels, winning them in minigames, or trading via the GBA Game Link Cable. Cards unlock minor bonuses like minigames and multiplayer characters.

== Plot ==
Doctor Neo Cortex and Ripto form an alliance, with Cortex genetically modifying Ripto's Riptoc army to resemble Crash and Spyro, sowing confusion to pit the heroes against each other. They plan to use warp pads and portals to steal Power Crystals and cause chaos in both Wumpa Jungle and Dragon Castles. Aku Aku and Coco alert Crash to strange creatures invading Wumpa Jungle, suspecting Cortex's involvement, while the Professor and Hunter inform Spyro of mysterious portals and orange monsters disrupting Dragon Castles, pointing to Ripto's schemes. Crash and Spyro set out to thwart their respective foe's plan.

Crash and Spyro encounter each other and, due to the villains' deception, initially fight, each mistaking the other for an enemy. After their battle, they realize the mix-up. Learning that Cortex and Ripto are working together, Crash and Spyro team up to stop them, with Coco and the Professor aiding their efforts. The heroes split up to cover more ground. Crash battles Cortex's minion Tiny Tiger, while Spyro faces Ripto's minions Crush and Gulp. Both heroes succeed, frustrating Cortex and Ripto, who bicker and call in Cortex's niece, Nina, to escalate their plan.

Nina kidnaps Coco and the Professor, destroying their research on the portals. Crash and Spyro work together to rescue them, with Crash distracting Nina while Spyro frees their friends. This setback forces the heroes to track Cortex and Ripto directly. Coco devises a plan to lure Cortex and Ripto out and place a tracer on them. Crash faces Ripto in Dragon Castles, while Spyro battles Cortex in Wumpa Jungle. Spyro successfully places a tracer on Cortex, revealing the villains' base in outer space. Crash and Spyro confront Cortex and Ripto together. They defeat the duo, foiling their plan to conquer the world. The heroes celebrate their victory, with Aku Aku, Spyro, and Crash affirming their alliance for future threats.

== Development and release ==
As production finished on Crash Nitro Kart, Vivendi Universal Games (VU Games) approached Vicarious Visions with the concept of bringing Crash Bandicoot and Spyro the Dragon together for the first time. Liking the idea, Vicarious Visions collaborated with VU Games in filling out the concept to what would become the two games. The games are the fourth installments of each series made for the Game Boy Advance (GBA). While Crash Purple is Vicarious Visions' fourth Crash Bandicoot title, Spyro Orange is their first Spyro title, the previous three Spyro games for the GBA having been developed by Digital Eclipse. The games were built on 128-megabit cartridges, which was twice the size of typical GBA games, making them the largest GBA games Vicarious Visions had developed at that point.

Kathy Carter of VU Games was the creative director of the two games, with VU's Caroline Trujillo serving as producer. The games were designed by Jonathan Russell and Colin Wilkinson, and programmed by Sunbir Gill, Jan-Erik Steel and Eric Caraszi. Brent Gibson, Chongguang Zhang, Robyn Poirier and Jason Harlow served as the games' artists, while Harlow, Travis Cameron, Kaan Kayimoglu and Rob Gallerani provided the animation. The audio was created by Shin'en Multimedia. The character Nina Cortex was created and designed by Duke Mighten for an early version of Crash Nitro Kart developed by Traveller's Tales, and was re-appropriated for Crash Twinsanity due to her popularity among the development team. Although Crash Twinsanity was intended to be Nina's debut appearance, the game's lead designer, Paul Gardner, was alerted to her early appearance in Crash Bandicoot Purple by concept artist Keith Webb, who came across Nina's image in newly released screenshots of the game.

The games were announced by VU Games on February 20, 2004, released in North America on June 1, and in Europe on June 25.

== Reception ==
Reception

Aggregate score
Aggregator	Score
Metacritic	67/100 (Crash Purple); 60/100 (Spyro Orange)

Review scores
Publication	Score
Eurogamer	7/10 (Crash Purple); 4/10 (Spyro Orange)
Game Informer	5.75/10
GameSpot	7.7/10 (Crash Purple); 5.9/10 (Spyro Orange)
GameSpy	3/5 (Crash Purple); 3/5 (Spyro Orange)
GameZone	5.3/10 (Crash Purple); 6.5/10 (Spyro Orange)
IGN	7/10 (Crash Purple); 7/10 (Spyro Orange)
Jeuxvideo.com	13/20 (Crash Purple); 12/20 (Spyro Orange)
Nintendo World Report	3.5/10 (Crash Purple); 4/10 (Spyro Orange)
Pocket Games	7.5/10

Crash Bandicoot Purple and Spyro Orange received "mixed or average" reviews according to review aggregator Metacritic. Critics noted that Crash Purple was geared toward experienced players, offering more challenge than Spyro Orange. While Frank Provo of GameSpot, David Chapman of GameSpy, Craig Harris of IGN, and Marc Camron of Pocket Games recommended the game for its fun minigames and nostalgic appeal, Mike Sklens of Planet GameCube strongly criticized it as a "poor excuse for a game" due to repetitive minigames and frustrating collect-a-thon mechanics. Spyro Orange was consistently described as targeting younger or less experienced players, making it less engaging for seasoned gamers. While Chapman and GameZone's Anise Hollingshead found it decent for its audience, Ben Kosmina of Planet GameCube was highly critical, calling it a disappointing departure from Vicarious Visions' stronger GBA titles, and Bramwell noted it as unimaginative and tedious compared to Crash Purple. Lisa Mason of Game Informer found both games a disjointed mix of ideas that failed to coalesce.

Critics generally praised the variety of minigames. Provo and Camron highlighted the fun and diverse minigames, with Provo noting their quality and whimsical nature. Harris appreciated the "old-school-inspired" minigames, such as those reminiscent of Combat or Stampede. However, some minigames, like the Breakout-style contests, were criticized as repetitive or boring. Chapman found the minigames to be the "real fun", while Jihem of Jeuxvideo.com noted their diversity but lamented their limited number. The minigames in Spyro Orange received mixed feedback, generally seen as less engaging than those in Crash Purple. Harris praised some minigames, like the shooter-style robot game (which Provo compared to Metal Storm), but noted many were recycled or less creative. Provo found them "OK" but less intricate, with only six unique minigames compared to Crash Purple's dozen-plus. Hollingshead described them as repetitive variations of Breakout or Pong-style games, lacking true variety. Mason found them more fun than those of Crash Purple but still poorly executed, while Kosmina called them bland and uncreative, likening them to poor arcade ripoffs.

The platforming elements were a consistent weak point, often described as simplistic and unengaging. Harris described the platforming as "surprisingly uncreative" and "busywork" with minimal challenge, a sentiment echoed by Provo, who still found it solid but less engaging than the minigames. Chapman noted the platforming as entertaining but unchallenging, while Sklens called it "pitifully easy" and a weak hub for minigames. Mason criticized the platforming as "derivative and uninspired". Harris noted that the platforming in Spyro Orange required more skill than that of Crash Purple but was hampered by loose controls and slowdown during Spyro's flame attack. Provo and Hollingshead criticized the basic, repetitive design, with Hollingshead noting it as a mere vehicle to reach minigames. Mason called the jumping "painful", and Kosmina saw the platforming as a weak hub. Bramwell found it minimal and unchallenging.

Both games were criticized for their brevity, with estimates falling around two hours. Chapman and Harris also mentioned the game's brevity, though they noted replayability through card collection and multiplayer modes. Provo and Camron acknowledged the short length but felt the minigames and card system added some replay value. Spyro Orange's lower difficulty, aimed at novice or younger players, was said to hold less appeal to experienced gamers. Hollingshead noted its accessibility for children but lack of challenge for adults, while Kosmina found the requirement to replay minigames multiple times to progress frustrating and tedious.

The trading card system was seen as underwhelming, with the cards serving little purpose beyond unlocking minor bonuses like multiplayer characters. Jihem and Kosmina criticized it as a weak gimmick, with Jihem seeing it as a futile attempt to extend playtime, and Kosmina lamenting the lack of interesting data or functionality, though Camron appreciated the replayability it offered. Hollingshead and Jihem saw the multiplayer modes as limited and not compelling enough to extend playtime significantly, and Harris noted the absence of high-score tracking in minigames, reducing replay incentive.

The presentations of both games were praised for maintaining the distinct looks and personalities of their respective franchises. Chapman emphasized the fidelity to Crash's trademark style, with vibrant graphics and funky music. Provo noted smooth animations and clever backgrounds, though Louis Bedigian of GameZone criticized the choppy enemy animations compared to Crash's smoother ones. Critics highlighted the retention of Spyro's colorful, vibrant aesthetic, with well-animated character sprites. However, Provo and Hollingshead noted less detailed backgrounds compared to Crash Purple, possibly to avoid overwhelming novice players. Kosmina acknowledged the solid graphics but felt they could not salvage the game's flaws.
