= Spyro: Year of the Dragon =

2000 video game

- North American cover art
- Developer: Insomniac Games
- Publisher: Sony Computer Entertainment
- Composers: Stewart Copeland; Ryan Beveridge
- Series: Spyro
- Platform: PlayStation
- Release: NA: October 10, 2000; EU: November 10, 2000
- Genre: Platform
- Mode: Single-player

Spyro: Year of the Dragon is a 2000 platform game developed by Insomniac Games and published by Sony Computer Entertainment for the PlayStation. The third installment in the Spyro series, Year of the Dragon follows the adventures of the titular purple dragon. After an evil sorceress steals magical dragon eggs from the land of the dragons, Spyro travels to the "Forgotten Realms" to retrieve them. Players travel across different worlds gathering gems and eggs, defeating enemies, and playing minigames. Year of the Dragon introduced new characters and minigames to the series, as well as offering improved graphics and music.

Year of the Dragon received critical acclaim, with reviewers noting how the game successfully built upon the formula of its predecessors. The game sold more than 3 million copies worldwide. Year of the Dragon was the last Spyro title released for the original PlayStation, and the last developed by Insomniac Games due to Universal Interactive Studios and Sony's souring relationship. Year of the Dragon was followed by the multiplatform title Spyro: Enter the Dragonfly (2002), and was later remade as part of the Spyro Reignited Trilogy in 2018.

== Gameplay ==
Spyro attacks various Rhynocs (pictured) throughout the game.

Year of the Dragon is a platform video game primarily played from a third person perspective. The main objective is to recover stolen dragon eggs which are scattered across 37 levels. These eggs are hidden, or are given as rewards for completing certain tasks and levels. The worlds of Spyro are linked together by "homeworlds" or "hubs", large worlds which contain gateways to many other levels. To proceed to the next hub, the character must complete five worlds, gather a certain number of eggs, and defeat a boss. Players do not need to gather every egg to complete the main portion of the game or gain access to new levels; in fact, certain eggs can only be found by returning to the world at a later time. Gems are scattered across the worlds, hidden in crates and jars. These gems are used to bribe a bear named Moneybags to release captured characters and activate things which help Spyro progress through levels. Gems, along with the number of eggs collected, count to the total completion percentage of the game. An atlas allows players to track their game completion and see remaining unfilled objectives.

The player controls the dragon Spyro for much of the game. Spyro's health is measured by his companion Sparx, a dragonfly who changes color and then disappears after taking damage. If the player does not have Sparx, the next hit causes the player to lose a life and restart at the last saved checkpoint. Consuming small wildlife known as fodder regenerates Sparx. Spyro has several abilities, including breathing fire, swimming and diving, gliding, and headbutting. These abilities are used to explore and to fight enemies, many of which are creatures called Rhynocs. Some foes are only vulnerable to certain moves. Spyro can also run through "Powerup Gates", which give him special abilities for a limited period.

Year of the Dragon introduces new playable characters other than Spyro, known as critters, which are unlocked by paying off the character Moneybags as the player proceeds through the game. Subsequently, the player plays as the critter in specially marked sections of levels. Each critter has their own special moves and abilities; Sheila the Kangaroo, for example, can double jump, while Sergeant Byrd is armed with rocket launchers and can fly.

Besides the primary quest to find dragon eggs, Year of the Dragon features an extensive set of minigames, which are split off from the levels into smaller zones. Some of the minigames were featured in Spyro 2: Ripto's Rage! and were subsequently expanded for Year of the Dragon, while others are entirely new to the series. The minigames are played by Spyro or the other critters, and include races, gunfights, and skateboarding.

== Plot ==
The game opens in the land of the dragons, where Spyro and his kin are celebrating the "Year of the Dragon", an event that occurs every twelve years when new dragon eggs are brought to the realm. During the celebration, the Sorceress' apprentice, Bianca, invades the Dragon Realms with an army of rhino-based creatures called Rhynocs, stealing all of the Dragon eggs. The Sorceress spreads the eggs throughout several worlds. Spyro, Sparx, and Spyro's friend Hunter are sent down a hole to find the thieves and recover the dragon eggs.

Spyro emerges in the Forgotten Realms (lands once inhabited by the dragons), where magic has gradually been disappearing. These worlds are under the iron-fisted reign of the Sorceress and her Rhynoc army. Spyro meets with Sheila the Kangaroo, Sergeant Byrd the Penguin, Bentley the Yeti, and Agent 9 the Monkey, all who help him on his quest. Spyro travels through each world, acquiring aid from the local inhabitants and rescuing the dragon eggs. It is revealed that the Sorceress banished the dragons, not realizing they were the source of magic, and wants to use the baby dragons' wings to concoct a spell that can grant her immortality. Once Bianca learns this, she turns against the Sorceress and helps Spyro defeat her. After the credits, the player can continue to find dragon eggs and gems to unlock the true ending, defeating the Sorceress once more for the final dragon egg. Spyro returns all of the baby dragons to the Dragon Realms. Along the journey to help Spyro recover the eggs, Hunter falls in love with Bianca, and they begin a relationship, with Spyro and Sparx looking on in dismay.

== Development ==
After developing the first-person shooter Disruptor, Insomniac Games worked on a third-person platformer that became Spyro the Dragon (1998). Spyro was followed by a sequel, Spyro 2: Ripto's Rage (1999). Development of the third Spyro title spanned about ten and a half months, from November 1999 to September 2000; the development team was influenced by a host of other games, including Doom and Crash Bandicoot. The game was named Year of the Dragon because it released during the year of the Dragon in the Chinese zodiac.

Feedback from fans of the previous games highlighted the depth and variety of the gameplay, and Insomniac CEO Ted Price described the goal of Year of the Dragon as "[pulling] out all the stops" with new challenges and diverse gameplay. Among the features added was "Auto Challenge Tuning", which was designed to dynamically and invisibly adjust the game's difficulty. The goal was that the most skilled players would be consistently challenged, while less-skilled players would not be discouraged by the difficulty and give up. The levels were made larger than those in Spyro 2, so that more areas for minigames could be added; to prevent player confusion on where to go next, these areas were designed to load separately from the main hubs. The addition of critters was a way to make the game more varied without just adding more moves for Spyro. Price also noted that their personalities helped freshen the story, which he considered a much more evolved and "coherent" plot than the one originally created for Spyro the Dragon, due to the studio's greater experience. Price stated that the emphasis for the title was on the new critters, but that Spyro would not be left behind in the story. In previews, publications such as IGN and GameSpot noted that the graphics had been improved, and that there were many new characters and locations.

"Fireworks Factory"
A segment of the track "Fireworks Factory". Reviewers applauded the high fidelity music, which brought added atmosphere to the game's levels.

The music for Year of the Dragon was composed by Stewart Copeland, former drummer for the rock band The Police. During the band's hiatus, Copeland composed several movie soundtracks, and composed the scores for the previous Spyro titles; Price stated that Copeland's offering for the third installment was his best work to date. In an interview, Copeland stated that his creative process for writing the music for the Spyro series always began by playing through the levels, trying to get a feel for each world's "atmosphere". Copeland noted the challenge of writing for games was to create music that would both be interesting to listen to and complemented the gameplay; his approach was to incorporate more complicated harmonies and basslines so that the music could seem fresh for players, even after repeated listening. He complimented the compact disc format of the PlayStation and its support for high quality audio; there were no technical constraints that stopped him from producing the sound he wanted. Copeland recorded entire orchestral scores for extra flourish when the visuals called for an expansive sound, but used more percussive and beat-driven melodies for "high-energy" moments in the game.

Year of the Dragon was developer Insomniac Games' last Spyro title. In an interview, Ted Price said that the company stopped producing the games because they could not do anything new with the character, and that after five years of development on a single series, the team wanted to do something different. They began prototyping what would become their next title, Ratchet & Clank, in the first half of 2000, while Year of the Dragon was still in production. The next console entry in the series, Spyro: Enter the Dragonfly, was released in 2002. Year of the Dragon was later packaged along with the first two Spyro games in the Spyro Reignited Trilogy.

== Release ==
Year of the Dragon released in the United States on October 10, 2000. While the upcoming PlayStation 2 was being aggressively promoted, Sony continued to support its three marquee PlayStation 1 games, including Year of the Dragon, with a $10 million advertising campaign. In an effort to reduce software piracy, Year of the Dragon implemented crack protection in addition to the copy protection previous games had contained. This helped prevent hackers from cracking the game until two months after release, rather than the week it had taken for Spyro 2. Since as much as half of a game's lifetime sales occurred during the early release window, Insomniac considered their effort a success.

The game sold more than two million units in the U.S. It received a "Platinum" sales award from the Entertainment and Leisure Software Publishers Association (ELSPA), indicating sales of at least 300,000 units in the UK. By June 2007, the game sold more than 3.2 million units worldwide.

== Reception ==
Reception

Aggregate score
Aggregator	Score
Metacritic	91/100

Review scores
Publication	Score
AllGame	4.5/5
CNET Gamecenter	9/10
Electronic Gaming Monthly	9/10, 7.5/10, 8/10 (Note: Three critics in Electronic Gaming Monthly each ranked the game on a ten-point scale.)
Game Informer	8.75/10
GameFan	90%
GamePro	5/5
GameRevolution	A−
GameSpot	8.4/10
IGN	9.1/10
Next Generation	4/5
Official U.S. PlayStation Magazine	5/5

Year of the Dragon received "universal acclaim" according to review aggregator Metacritic. Critics including NextGen, AllGame, and PSXExtreme called it the best entry in the series thus far, with AllGame's Chris Simpson considering it one of the PlayStation's best platformers. GameSpot's Brad Shoemaker and IGN's David Smith noted that the game only brought minor refinements to the series, but that if players liked the previous games, they would enjoy Year of the Dragon as much or more. Reviews often highlighted the game's high level of polish.

Andrew Reiner, writing for Game Informer, said the gameplay managed to be accessible for audiences of all ages, while still offering a challenge. GamePro noted that the ability of the game to automatically drop the difficulty if players get stuck was an excellent feature. While Electronic Gaming Monthly's Ryan Lockheart wrote that Year of the Dragon had the best camera of any 3D game he had played, other reviewers found fault with the camera, particularly when it was unable to keep up with Spyro. While Gamecenter's Mark Salzman appreciated the optional camera modes were better than previous games in the series, he still found that the camera could cause issues. The addition of new playable characters and minigames was received favorably.

The graphics were praised, with NextGen's Kevin Rice comparing the title to Donkey Kong Country as an example of excellent graphics on outdated hardware, while AllGame's Chris Simpson calling the title perhaps the best-looking platformer on the PlayStation. Simpson and Salzman highlighted the lack of frame rate issues despite the graphics, though GamePro noticed infrequent slowdowns in the most hectic scenes. Shoemaker considered the only flaws of the game's presentation inherent with all PlayStation games, though these weaknesses were hidden well. Publications like PSXExtreme thought the music helped bring atmosphere to the varied worlds, and Simpson enthused that Insomniac understood the importance of how game music can enhance the experience. The voice acting was also praised. Joseph Parazen of GameRevolution found the sound to be competently done but argued background music and sound effects were both fairly generic.

During the 4th Annual Interactive Achievement Awards, the Academy of Interactive Arts & Sciences nominated Spyro: Year of the Dragon for the "Art Direction", "Console Action/Adventure", "Console Game of the Year", and "Game of the Year" awards, all of which were ultimately given to Final Fantasy IX, The Legend of Zelda: Majora's Mask, SSX, and Diablo II, respectively.
