= Spyro Reignited Trilogy =

2018 video game compilation

- Developer: Toys for Bob (Note: The original games were developed by Insomniac Games. Sanzaru Games led the development of the Spyro: Year of the Dragon remake. The Windows port was handled by Iron Galaxy.)
- Publisher: Activision
- Director: Dan Neil
- Designers: Toby Schadt; Ray West
- Programmer: Brent Hostrawser
- Artists: Amber Long; Josh Nadelberg
- Composer: Stewart Copeland (Note: Arranged by Stephan Vankov)
- Series: Spyro
- Engine: Unreal Engine 4
- Platforms: PlayStation 4; Xbox One; Nintendo Switch; Windows
- Release: PlayStation 4, Xbox One; November 13, 2018; Switch, Windows; September 3, 2019
- Genre: Platform
- Mode: Single-player

Spyro Reignited Trilogy is a 2018 platform game compilation developed by Toys for Bob and published by Activision. It includes remakes of the original trilogy in the Spyro series: Spyro the Dragon (1998), Spyro 2: Ripto's Rage! (1999), and Spyro: Year of the Dragon (2000) that were originally developed by Insomniac Games. Reignited was released for PlayStation 4 and Xbox One in November 2018, while Nintendo Switch and Windows versions were released in September 2019. The collection received positive reviews from critics and has sold over 11 million units as of June 2026, making it the best-selling game in the series.

== Gameplay ==
Each game in Spyro Reignited Trilogy is a 3D platformer featuring the titular protagonist, a juvenile purple dragon named Spyro, as he attempts to restore peace in a set of worlds specific to each game by vanquishing enemies. Spyro's sidekick, a dragonfly named Sparx, acts as an indicator of his health, defending him from a limited number of enemy attacks. Additionally, the games feature a number of collectibles which must be acquired to make progress such as gems, which also act as currency, and dragon eggs.

Spyro Reignited Trilogy attempts to mostly remain faithful to the gameplay of the original games. Each level is designed to match the size and layout of those in the originals. Gameplay features were unified across all three titles, adding "skill points" to the first game, and the side-to-side roll move was added to the second and third games.

The compilation offers two different control schemes: one based on the original trilogy, and a modern setup that maps camera controls to the right analog stick and Spyro's fire breathing attack to the right trigger.

== Development and release ==
A comparison between the first hub world of the original game (above) and the Reignited Trilogy version (below)

Discussions about the revival of Spyro the Dragon began as early as 2014. In July 2014, now former Sony Computer Entertainment chairman Andrew House stated that his team was considering bringing Spyro back, adding that he believed longtime fans would be interested in revisiting a character from their youth. Later that same year, Insomniac Games CEO Ted Price also stated that making a new Spyro game was a possibility. In 2017, developer Vicarious Visions stated that they were aware of how high the popular demand was for a revival of the classic Spyro trilogy following the release of their previous remake, Crash Bandicoot N. Sane Trilogy.

The existence of Spyro remakes was originally teased in April 2018 when several media outlets received a package with a purple egg from someone under the alias "Falcon McBob". The Reignited Trilogy was officially revealed a few days later on April 5, 2018. Unlike the N. Sane Trilogy, the development of Reignited Trilogy was a more collaborative effort between Toys for Bob and Insomniac Games. In the early planning stages, the staff from Toys for Bob brought their concept sketches of the titular character to the original team and held several discussions on how the character should look, with especially strong input from Ted Price. One of the key goals of the Reignited Trilogy, according to art director Josh Nadelberg, was to "get Spyro right". This involved putting Spyro's model through rigorous stress tests to explore the range of emotions and expressions that could be yielded before and after the discussions with Insomniac staff. Because Insomniac Games could not provide source code or original assets to use as a reference, Toys for Bob utilized an in-house emulation tool called "Spyro-scope" which showed the schematics of a level's geometry and revealed patterns in enemy pathfinding. The game also received development assistance from Sanzaru Games, the developer of The Sly Collection and Sly Cooper: Thieves in Time, in developing the alternate gameplay styles in Year of the Dragon. Reignited Trilogy uses the Unreal Engine 4 game engine.

=== Audio ===
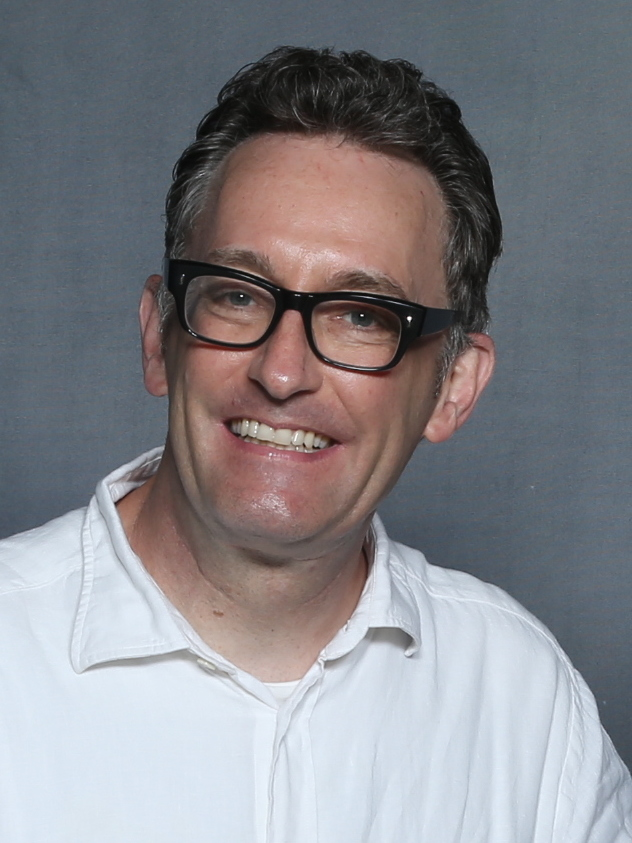
Veteran voice actor Tom Kenny reprised his role as Spyro the Dragon.

Stewart Copeland, the music composer of the original trilogy, wrote a new theme for the compilation, and his original compositions were arranged by Toys for Bob lead audio designer Stephan Vankov. The game gives the option to freely choose between the two soundtracks, and the arranged soundtrack dynamically adjusts its tempo during gameplay.

Tom Kenny, who originally voiced Spyro in the original Ripto's Rage and Year of the Dragon, returned to reprise his role for the first time in sixteen years following the 2002 release of Enter the Dragonfly. All of Spyro's lines were re-recorded, including the first game in which he was originally voiced by Carlos Alazraqui. Kenny also reprises his roles of The Professor and Sgt. James Byrd.

Other returning voice actors from the original games include Michael Gough as Gnasty Gnorc, Gregg Berger as Ripto, André Sogliuzzo as Sparx the Dragonfly and Richard Tatum as both Agent 9 and Bartholomew. Despite returning to voice Ripto, Berger does not reprise his role of Hunter the Cheetah, who is now voiced by Robbie Daymond. The remaining principal characters were recast, consisting of Cassandra Lee Morris as Elora the Faun, Catherine Taber as Zoe the Fairy, J.B. Blanc as Moneybags the Bear, Melissa Hutchison as Bianca the Rabbit, Chantelle Barry as Shelia the Kangaroo, Dave B. Mitchell as Bentley the Yeti, and Cissy Jones as the Sorceress.

== Release ==
After initially being scheduled for release on September 21, 2018, it was delayed and released on November 13 of the same year. The initial physical release of Reignited Trilogy contains Spyro the Dragon in full, as well as a subset of levels from Ripto's Rage! and Year of the Dragon; the remaining data must be downloaded as part of an in-game update. Later releases of the PlayStation 4 and Xbox One versions contain all three games without a download requirement. At E3 2019, versions for Nintendo Switch and Windows were announced, which were released on September 3, 2019.

== Reception ==
Reception

Aggregate score
| Aggregator | Score |
|---|---|
| Metacritic | (PS4) 82/100 (XONE) 83/100 (NS) 79/100 (PC) 75/100 |

Review scores
| Publication | Score |
|---|---|
| Destructoid | 8/10 |
| Electronic Gaming Monthly | 4/5 |
| Game Informer | 8.5/10 |
| GameRevolution | 4/5 |
| GameSpot | 8/10 |
| GamesRadar+ | 4/5 |
| IGN | 8.5/10 |

Spyro Reignited Trilogy received "generally favorable reviews" according to review aggregator platform Metacritic. Multiple aspects of the game were praised, such as the upgraded visuals, attention to detail, and faithfulness to the original trilogy. Jonathon Dornbush of IGN praised the game's attention to detail, noting both the level design, with "gorgeous horizons" and layouts "pristine and accurate to the original", and character upgrades, such as non-playable characters exhibiting more unique and expressive personalities. Mitch Wallace of Forbes similarly highlighted the game's detail, calling the levels "childlike fantasy made playable", while also praising Toys for Bob's ability to faithfully recreate the games despite not having access to the original source code. Chris Moyse of Destructoid commended the game's soundtrack for its rerecording, "dynamic" aspect in which tempo adjusted to match Spyro's activity, and the option to switch to the original recordings.

The game was criticized for issues such as long loading times, glitches, and frame-rate. Wallace noted all of these aspects, calling the loading times in particular "a tad unacceptable" for being "slightly longer" than those of the original games, despite being produced two decades later for more advanced consoles. Moyse noted that the game, in remaining faithful, retained some of the original games' flaws, particularly the overall "bland" and linear objectives. Jeremy Winslow of Slant reiterated that criticism, calling Ripto's Rage and Year of the Dragon "mere reskins" of the first game, while also chiding the game's inconsistent frame-rate and "slippery" controls.

=== Sales ===
Publisher Activision stated Spyro Reignited Trilogy "performed well" in its initial release. In the UK, the game reached first place on the all-formats sales chart in its first week; while it sold less than Pokémon: Let's Go, it outsold both its Pikachu and Eevee versions individually. It placed at the sixth position in the Switzerland all-format charts. It was also the best-selling PlayStation 4 game in its first week in Australia.

As of September 2023, Spyro Reignited Trilogy has sold over 10 million units. By June 2026, the game was confirmed to have sold 11 million copies.

=== Awards ===
Spyro Reignited Trilogy won the award for "Family/Kids Title of the Year" at the Australian Games Awards, and was nominated for the Freedom Tower Award for Best Remake at the New York Game Awards, and for "People's Choice" at the Italian Video Game Awards.
