= Spyro: Attack of the Rhynocs =

2003 video game

- North American box art
- Developer: Digital Eclipse
- Publisher: Universal Interactive
- Director: Michael Mika Sr.
- Producer: Lorie Clay
- Designers: Ryan Slemko; Darren Schebek
- Programmer: Pierre-Luc Tardif
- Artist: Ryan Slemko
- Composer: Robert Baffy
- Series: Spyro
- Platform: Game Boy Advance
- Release: NA: October 28, 2003; EU: November 14, 2003
- Genres: Platform, action-adventure
- Mode: Single-player

Spyro: Attack of the Rhynocs (known in Europe as Spyro Adventure) is a 2003 platform game developed by Digital Eclipse and published by Universal Interactive for the Game Boy Advance. It was the last Spyro game to be released under the Universal Interactive label, which would be phased out shortly after the game's release. It was also the final Spyro game to be developed by Digital Eclipse, who would be replaced for the next major handheld entries by Amaze Entertainment.

== Gameplay ==
The game plays similar to the previous two Game Boy Advance entries but expands on roleplaying concepts and item collecting than the previous two and has a much higher focus on role playing than platforming unlike the previous two entries. Players still collect gems and various other collectables and use portals to warp from level to level.

== Plot ==
In the Professor's lab, The Professor shows Spyro and Sparx his two new inventions. The first is a projector-like peephole machine, enabling them to spy on Ripto. The Professor then displays his next new invention – Butler, a large mechanical bear designed to help him in his lab. Unfortunately Butler malfunctions and the Professor has failed to equip it with an "off" switch. Spyro manages to short Butler out by luring him into a power generator, then the peephole machine malfunctions and the hole in the fabric of space begins to expand rapidly.

A terrified Professor tells Spyro about "Hearts" – magical objects with very special properties and the only way to control the problem. The Professor is about to give him a warp device that will allow him to travel to all the other lands, when Ripto appears through the hole and claims the device for himself with the advantage he can rapidly conquer the surrounding lands. Ripto warps out Spyro along with Sparx and Butler to the Dragon Shores.

After Spyro is able to travel back to the Professor's Lab and travel through the peephole's vortex to Ripto's Chateau, he finds Ripto about to lower the Professor into a pit of lava, but engages in combat with Spyro. After being defeated, Ripto captures him and Sparx. Butler reappears, and the Professor orders him to trap Ripto. Ripto, now incapacitated, yields the final heart and the Professor permanently seals the hole in space.

== Reception ==
Reception

Aggregate score
Aggregator	Score
Metacritic	72/100

Review scores
Publication	Score
1Up.com	C+
Game Informer	5.5/10
GamePro	4/5
GameSpot	8/10
GameSpy	4/5
GameZone	7.9/10
IGN	8/10
Nintendo Power	3.3/5

Attack of the Rhynocs received "mixed or average reviews" according to the review aggregation website Metacritic.
