= Alex Schaefer =

American artist, painter, and activist

- Born: Alexander Schaefer; 1969 (age 56–57); Los Angeles, California
- Education: ArtCenter College of Design (1989 - 1992)
- Known for: Painting; Drawing; Sketching; Spyro
- Notable work: Banks on Fire
- Movement: Political

Alex Schaefer (born 1969) is an American artist, painter, activist, and educator. He is a notable figure in the Los Angeles contemporary art scene, and has received widespread coverage regarding his series of paintings depicting real-world branches of various banks on fire.

== Early life ==
Alexander Schaefer was born in Los Angeles, California, in 1969, and is a graduate of the ArtCenter College of Design in Pasadena. He has previously worked as a digital artist at Disney Interactive and Insomniac Games, and has taught at California State University, Los Angeles, as well as his alma mater, the ArtCenter College of Design.

== Artistic career ==
Schaefer's work has been shown at galleries around California, including the Charlie James Gallery, the Pasadena Museum of California Art, and the Bergamot Station Arts Center.

Alex Schaefer is also one of the co-creators of the popular video game series Spyro the Dragon.

The artist has received attention for his series of oil paintings portraying various banks in the Los Angeles area on fire, done en plein air in front of the buildings themselves. Much of the work in the series focuses on branches of Chase Bank, though other banks such as Bank of America and Wells Fargo have been depicted as well. The subject matter, as well as his presence near the buildings that he paints, has resulted in Schaefer being questioned by law enforcement at several instances. The series began evolving in 2009, with the most publicized being painted in front of a Chase Bank in the Van Nuys neighborhood of Los Angeles in 2011.

In July 2012, Schaefer was arrested after creating chalk drawings on the sidewalk outside of a Chase Bank in Los Angeles. He spent twelve hours in jail on a misdemeanor vandalism charge.

Schaefer has sold some paintings in his Banks on Fire series, with one painting in 2011 fetching upwards of $25,000. The series has also attracted attention from those active in the Bitcoin community, members of which Schaefer says are drawn to the imagery of traditional financial institutions on fire, and who have been the source of some of his sales of the series.

Schaefer has also created a series of NFT art pieces. Some of the pieces were displayed in an NFT showcase at Superchief Gallery, a New York City art gallery.

On Thursday, September 14, 2023, Alex Schaefer ranked first on a list titled "The 9 Top Bitcoin Artists."
