= Spyro 2: Ripto's Rage! =

1999 video game

- North American cover art
- Developer: Insomniac Games
- Publisher: Sony Computer Entertainment
- Producer: Grady Hunt
- Artists: Craig Stitt; Oliver Wade
- Composer: Stewart Copeland
- Series: Spyro
- Platform: PlayStation
- Release: NA: November 2, 1999; EU: November 5, 1999
- Genres: Platform, action-adventure
- Mode: Single-player

Spyro 2: Ripto's Rage!, known as Spyro 2: Gateway to Glimmer in PAL regions, is a 1999 platform game developed by Insomniac Games and published by Sony Computer Entertainment for the PlayStation. It is the second installment in the Spyro series and a sequel to Spyro the Dragon (1998).

The game begins with Spyro planning to take a vacation after his previous adventures. However, he is unexpectedly transported to the realm of Avalar, where the malevolent sorcerer Ripto has emerged and is wreaking havoc. Spyro joins forces with the inhabitants of Avalar to confront Ripto and put an end to his destructive reign.

Ripto’s Rage! introduced several new mechanics not present in its predecessor, such as swimming, climbing, and power-up gates that temporarily grant Spyro abilities like superflame or flight. Levels also feature side quests, mini-games, and boss battles, adding more variety and complexity than the first game.

The game received positive reviews from critics, who praised its colorful graphics, improved gameplay variety, and larger amount of content. It was followed by Spyro: Year of the Dragon in 2000, and later remade as part of the Spyro Reignited Trilogy in 2018.

== Gameplay ==
Upon completing a level, a character will present Spyro with a talisman, which must be gained in order to progress.

Players control Spyro the Dragon as he fights against various enemies and obstacles using his flame breath, charge attack, and glide abilities. His health is indicated by the color of his dragonfly partner, Sparx, who can replenish his health by eating butterflies. Bottled butterflies will both completely restore Sparx's health and give Spyro an extra life. If Sparx eats enough butterflies, Spyro will receive an extra life. Butterflies can be acquired by flaming, charging, or head-bashing the various fodder scattered throughout the game.

The game is split up into three main homeworlds containing portals to various realms. In order to progress through the first two homeworlds, the player must acquire a talisman from each realm, which is awarded for reaching the end of the realm. Once enough talismans are collected, the player can face the boss of each homeworld. Each realm also contains a certain number of orbs, which can be earned by completing secondary tasks for particular NPCs, such as lighting a series of lamps or protecting characters from attacks. These orbs are required for opening some of the portals to certain realms, as well as progressing through the third homeworld. Gems gathered throughout the game are required to pay fees that Moneybags, a money hungry bear, charges in order to progress through the game. As well as opening portals or granting access to certain areas, Moneybags also teaches Spyro three brand new abilities over the course of the game. Swimming lets Spyro dive underwater to reach submerged treasure and hidden tunnels, climbing lets Spyro climb up certain surfaces, and the headbash lets Spyro perform an overhead smashing attack which can break rocks and certain cages. In addition, each realm has a power-up gate, activated after defeating a specific number of enemies in a realm, which grants Spyro a temporary super-ability. The power-up can grant invulnerability or the abilities to fly, supercharge, super flame, breathe ice, or super jump to reach high up areas.

=== Characters and setting ===
The only characters from the original game to return as main characters in this game are Spyro, the game's protagonist, and Sparx, his dragonfly sidekick. Sparx functions as the player's health meter, and assists the player in gathering gems. This game introduces new characters into the Spyro series, many of whom would appear in later games. Both Hunter the Cheetah and Moneybags the bear make recurring appearances in the series, while Ripto would make more series appearances than any other antagonist, making him the key villain of the original series. The dragons of the previous installment have been replaced with an entirely new cast of characters, including fauns, satyrs, anthropomorphic animals, and robotic businessmen, among others.

The world of Avalar is divided into three homeworlds: Summer Forest, Autumn Plains, and Winter Tundra. In every realm, there is a castle that, during the course of the storyline, is captured by Ripto. Each homeworld features a number of different realms, a speedway realm, and a dungeon realm in which Ripto or his minions are hiding.

== Plot ==
Sometime after the defeat of Gnasty Gnorc, Spyro the Dragon and his dragonfly partner, Sparx, having had enough with the continuous raining in Artisans, decide to take a vacation to Dragon Shores. Upon going through the portal, however, Spyro instead ends up in Glimmer, one of the many realms of the fantasy land Avalar, having been summoned there by Elora the Faun, Hunter the Cheetah, and the Professor. They explain that one week prior, they were experimenting with a large portal device when they inadvertently summoned an angry, iron-fisted warlock known as Ripto, along with his minions Crush and Gulp. Pleased to find himself in a world without dragons, whom he views as pests, Ripto decided to conquer Avalar, prompting Elora and the others to deactivate the portal by scattering the mystical orbs powering it all across the homeworlds and in the realms. As Ripto and his henchmen leave to retrieve the orbs, Elora gets the idea to summon a dragon to fight against him, thus leading to Spyro's situation. After getting stranded in Avalar as a result of Ripto destroying the portal he came in through, Spyro agrees to help fight against him.

During his quest, Spyro must travel through the various realms of Avalar and help the inhabitants with certain problems they are facing in order to receive their realm's talisman, which Spyro must use to undo Ripto's tyranny. Spyro must also collect the orbs scattered across Avalar to empower portals and other various devices or spells, as well as gems to pay off the money hungry bear, Moneybags for certain favors. Hunter the Cheetah helps Spyro out on certain missions with his athletic abilities, and the Professor does the same using his intellect.

After collecting six talismans in Summer Forest, Spyro fights and defeats Crush, prompting Ripto and Gulp to retreat. The young dragon then pursues them to Autumn Plains, where he collects eight more talismans before engaging and vanquishing Gulp in combat. Then, Ripto seemingly falls to his demise, and Elora and her friends repay Spyro by returning to Winter Tundra and reactivating the portal device to send him to Dragon Shores. However, Ripto reveals himself to still be alive and steals the power crystal that was meant to power the portal, using it to create a new magic scepter (since Gulp ate the original in the intro). After collecting enough orbs, Spyro is able to confront Ripto; the warlock ironically perishes in a lake of lava which he himself created. With peace returned to Avalar, Elora and the others return all the gems that Moneybags had extorted from Spyro to fix the portal device, allowing Spyro to take his long-awaited vacation to Dragon Shores.

The game's epilogue, which is unlocked by completing the Skill Points list in the Guidebook, reveals what happened to various friends and enemies that Spyro encountered in Avalar, as well as moments such as Spyro and Elora missing their chance to kiss, the Professor teaching Crush how to spell, and one of the dragons from Spyro's home encountering Ripto. In the end, Spyro returns to the Dragon Realm, with Hunter joining him, setting the stage for the next game.

== Development ==
According to Ted Price, Insomniac's president and founder, the game was designed to provide a "greater challenge" for experienced players, as it was made to have greater depth and more gameplay variety than Spyro the Dragon. The music for Spyro 2: Ripto's Rage! was composed by Stewart Copeland and was engineered and co-produced by Jeff Seitz. Copeland's jungle-style beats and rhythmic style change throughout the game while remaining approachable and fun. The character Spyro is voiced by Tom Kenny, replacing Carlos Alazraqui from the first game, while additional voices are provided by Kenny, Gregg Berger, Melissa Disney, Milton James, Mary Linda Phillips and Marcelo Tubert. The game's sound effects were created by Mike Gollom, Harry Woolway and Ron Horwitz of Universal Sound Studios. The name of the game's villain, "Ripto" originated from the Japanese katakana spelling of Spyro (スパイロ).

== Release ==
Spyro 2: Ripto's Rage! was officially announced at the 1999 E3 convention in Los Angeles, CA. It was released in North America on November 2, 1999. Sony Computer Entertainment of America director of product development Ami Blaire stated, "Spyro 2 isn't just another sequel. Players will surely be lured by Spyro's playful antics, but they'll experience gameplay that's more challenging and more fun then ever before." In Japan, where the game was ported for release under the name Spyro X Sparx: Tondemo Tours (スパイロ×スパークス トンでもツアーズ, Supairo × Supākusu Tondemo Tsuāzu) on March 16, 2000.

=== Re-releases ===
The game became available for download on the European PlayStation Network on July 26, 2007, before its predecessor was released to the same market. Less than a week later, however, it was removed because the "Colossus" and "Idol Springs" levels failed to load. On April 17, 2008, it was released on the Japanese PlayStation Store. On May 7, 2009, the game became available for download from the North American PlayStation Store and a corrected version was re-released on the European PlayStation Store on December 12, 2012, although as the NTSC version instead of PAL. Spyro 2, alongside its predecessor and sequel, received a remastered release with updated visuals on November 13, 2018 as part of the Spyro Reignited Trilogy compilation for PlayStation 4 and Xbox One. This compilation retains the game's North American name, Ripto's Rage!, as opposed to the title used for the original PAL regions release, Gateway to Glimmer.

== Reception ==
Reception

Aggregate score
Aggregator	Score
GameRankings	87%

Review scores
Publication	Score
AllGame	4/5
CNET Gamecenter	9/10
Electronic Gaming Monthly	8.625/10 (Note: In Electronic Gaming Monthly's review of the game, one critic gave it 9/10, and the rest gave it each a score of 8.5/10.)
Famitsu	30/40
Game Informer	8.75/10
GameFan	(R.M.) 93% (T.R.) 90% 83% (Note: In GameFan's viewpoint of the game, three critics gave it each a score of 90, 78, and 81.)
GameRevolution	B+
GameSpot	8.6/10
IGN	8.8/10
Next Generation	3/5
Official U.S. PlayStation Magazine	4.5/5
The Cincinnati Enquirer	3.5/4
The Sydney Morning Herald	4.5/5

The game received favorable reviews according to the review aggregation website GameRankings. However, Chris Kramer of NextGen said that the game "feels like a kids' title, but it has more meat to it than the first, and the cute graphics may make your girlfriend finally stop cooing over those damn Pokémon." GamePro said of the game, "If you simply loved the first Spyro, or are very intrigued by the second, you can't go wrong with Spyro 2: Ripto's Rage. Once you get over its cute exterior, you'll find an excellent platform action/adventure game ripe with the goods that make gaming great." (Note: GamePro gave the game two 5/5 scores for graphics and sound, and two 4.5/5 scores for control and fun factor.) Famitsu gave it a score of 30 out of 40.

=== Sales and accolades ===
Following its release, the game received a "Gold" sales award from the Entertainment and Leisure Software Publishers Association (ELSPA), indicating sales of at least 200,000 units in the UK. By December 1999, the game sold a million copies in North America. As of June 30, 2007, the game sold more than 3.4 million units.

The Academy of Interactive Arts & Sciences (AIAS) nominated Spyro 2: Ripto's Rage! for "Console Children's/Family Title of the Year", "Outstanding Achievement in Art Direction", and "Outstanding Achievement in Animation" at the 3rd Annual Interactive Achievement Awards; they were ultimately awarded to Pokémon Snap (Children's/Family) and Final Fantasy VIII (Art Direction, Animation).
