= Spyro =

Series of platform video games

- Logo since 2026
- Genres: Platform; Action-adventure
- Developer: Insomniac Games (1998–2000); Equinoxe Digital Entertainment (2002); Check Six Studios (2002); Eurocom (2004); Krome Studios (2006–2007); Étranges Libellules (2008); Toys for Bob (2018–present); Others: Digital Eclipse (2001–2003); Vicarious Visions (2004); Kaolink (2004); Amaze Entertainment (2005–2007); Big Ant Studios (2006); The Mighty Troglodytes (2006–2008); Tantalus Media (2008)
- Publisher: Sony Computer Entertainment (1998–2000); Universal Interactive (1998–2003); Vivendi Games (Note: Released under the Sierra Entertainment and the Coktel Vision brand.) (2004–2008); Activision (2008–present); Others: Digital Bridges (2004); WonderPhone (2004); Vivendi Games Mobile (2006–2008)
- Creators: John Fiorito; Dan Johnson; Jared Hardy; Alex Hastings; Brian Hastings; Alain Maindron; Chris McNulty; Ted Price; Alex Schaefer; Craig Stitt; Chuck Suong; Oliver Wade; Matthew Whiting; Charles Zembillas
- Platforms: PlayStation; Game Boy Advance; PlayStation 2; GameCube; Xbox; Nintendo DS; Java ME; Wii; PlayStation 3; Xbox 360; PlayStation 4; Xbox One; Microsoft Windows; Nintendo Switch; PlayStation 5; Xbox Series X/S; Nintendo Switch 2
- First release: Spyro the Dragon; September 9, 1998
- Latest release: Spyro Reignited Trilogy; November 13, 2018

Spyro is a platform game series originally created by Insomniac Games as an exclusive for Sony's PlayStation console. The series features the adventures of the titular character, a young purple dragon. Since the series' introduction in 1998, there have been numerous sequels and a reboot trilogy. The series was originally produced by Universal Interactive, later became known as Vivendi Games; the rights to the intellectual property were acquired by Activision after its merge with Vivendi in 2008.

The series went dormant for a decade, until a collection of remakes of the original Spyro PlayStation trilogy called Spyro Reignited Trilogy, developed by Toys for Bob, was released for the PlayStation 4 and Xbox One in November 2018, and later for Microsoft Windows and Nintendo Switch in September 2019. In 2026, a brand-new entry in the series, Spyro: A Realm Beyond, was announced, set for release in Spring 2027.

== Development and history ==
Release timeline
1998	Spyro the Dragon
1999	Spyro 2: Ripto's Rage!
2000	Spyro: Year of the Dragon
2001	Spyro: Season of Ice
2002	Spyro 2: Season of Flame
2002	Spyro: Enter the Dragonfly
2003	Spyro: Attack of the Rhynocs
2004	Crash Bandicoot Purple and Spyro Orange
2004	Spyro: A Hero's Tail
2004	Spyro: Ripto Quest
2005	Spyro the Dragon
2005	Spyro: Shadow Legacy
2006	The Legend of Spyro: A New Beginning
2007	The Legend of Spyro: The Eternal Night
2008	The Legend of Spyro: Dawn of the Dragon
2009–2017
2018	Spyro Reignited Trilogy
2019–2026
2027	Spyro: A Realm Beyond

=== PlayStation exclusivity (1998–2000) ===
Spyro the Dragon was released in North America on 9 September 1998 and Europe on 23 October 1998 for the PlayStation. It is a platform game that placed the player as Spyro, a small purple dragon set with the task of freeing his fellow dragons from crystal prisons, which are scattered around their world. Each level is accessed through 'portals' from a main world. The game closes out with the climactic battle between Spyro and the primary antagonist, Gnasty Gnorc. The game sold well, with a total of five million copies being sold worldwide. The game received favorable reviews from IGN giving Spyro the Dragon a 9 out of 10. It received acclaim for its musical score by Stewart Copeland.

Ripto's Rage!, known as Gateway to Glimmer in PAL regions, followed on from the success of the first title, making its release on 2 November 1999 in North America and 5 November 1999 in Europe for the PlayStation. The game introduced new characters including Hunter, a cheetah; Elora, a faun; The Professor, a mole; and Zoe, a fairy. The structure of the game is similar to the first, with levels being accessed from the three main home worlds: Summer Forest, Autumn Plains, and Winter Tundra. The game ends with the climactic duel between Spyro and the primary antagonist, Ripto. The game introduces some abilities for Spyro, including hovering after a glide, swimming underwater, climbing ladders, head-bashing, and the ability to use power-ups. Like its predecessor, it was critically acclaimed.

Year of the Dragon was released in North America on 24 October 2000 and Europe on 10 November 2000 for the PlayStation, and it was Insomniac's last Spyro game. In the game, the dragons are celebrating the Year of the Dragon, an event held every twelve years in which new dragon eggs arrive in the dragon worlds. Bianca, an anthropomorphic rabbit and apprentice to the primary antagonist, The Sorceress, invades the Dragon Realms to steal the dragon eggs. During her escape, Spyro pursues Bianca down a rabbit hole that serves as a portal to the Forgotten Realms. This long-abandoned territory is governed by The Sorceress, who seeks the dragon eggs to harness their wings and restore magic to her fading domain. As in the previous games, levels are accessed from a central home world, of which there are four: Sunrise Spring, Midday Gardens, Evening Lake, and Midnight Mountain. The game also features levels in which the player controls "Sparx", Spyro's companion dragonfly, in a bird's eye view shooting game as well as four new playable characters: Sheila the Kangaroo, Sgt. Byrd the Penguin, Bentley the Yeti, and Agent 9 the Monkey.

=== Multiplatform and handhelds (2001–05) ===
Season of Ice was the first Spyro game not to be developed by Insomniac Games or be on a Sony console, released for the Game Boy Advance and developed by Digital Eclipse. It is known as Spyro Advance in Japan. Spyro must use his fire breath to rescue the fairies in the various Fairy Realms after they are frozen by an evil monster named Grendor.

Season of Flame was the second Digital Eclipse title and was released for the Game Boy Advance. It is the sequel to Season of Ice, and introduces new features, such as the ability to breathe other elements besides fire. In the game, Spyro must recover the stolen fireflies scattered across the Dragon Realms and foil an evil plot by Ripto and his minions.

Enter the Dragonfly is available for the PlayStation 2 and Nintendo GameCube, and was developed by Equinoxe Digital Entertainment and Check Six Studios. It had received mixed to negative responses from reviewers, referring to the numerous glitches, lack of storyline, originality, and long load times. The story begins with the baby dragons preparing to receive their dragonflies and celebrating. Ripto captures the dragonflies, making the dragons helpless, and accidentally scatters the dragonflies across the world with a spell. Spyro must recover the dragonflies.

Attack of the Rhynocs, also known as Spyro Adventure in Europe and Australia, is the third and final game to be developed by Digital Eclipse. Spyro is tasked with collecting the "Heart" of each land in order to stop Ripto's latest evil scheme after a machine malfunctions opening a portal, bringing Ripto back into the dragon realms following the events of Enter The Dragonfly.

The Cortex Conspiracy, known as Spyro Fusion in Europe and Australia, and Spyro Advance Wakuwaku Tomodachi Daisakusen! in Japan, introduces multiple game screening. It is a crossover game between Spyro the Dragon and Crash Bandicoot, and a companion game to Crash Bandicoot Purple: Ripto's Rampage. In the game, Spyro travels through Crash's universe in a side-scroller, rather than the traditional isometric, top-down view.

A Hero's Tail is available for the PlayStation 2, Xbox and Nintendo GameCube, and was created by Eurocom. The game revolves around an evil plot by the villain Red, a former Dragon Elder, who begins to plant Dark Gems around the Dragon Realms, sucking the life out of these worlds. He also works alongside Gnasty Gnorc and Ineptune. Spyro then begins his journey to destroy all the Dark Gems, alongside Sparx, Hunter, Sgt. Byrd, and Blink.

Ripto Quest was released for mobile phones on November 12, 2004. It is depicted from an isometric viewpoint. The plot has Spyro collecting four machine parts to stop Ripto. Levi Buchanan writing for IGN and GameSpy gave the game a positive review.

Shadow Legacy acts as a sequel to Spyro: A Hero's Tail and was released only on the Nintendo DS. This is the first Spyro game that plays as a role-playing game as opposed to a platformer and the game allows Spyro to gain experience, level up and learn new spells and combat moves. Spyro must use his new skills to save his allies when they are trapped in the "Shadow Realm" which features returning levels from the Dragon Kingdom, Avalar, and the Forgotten Realms.

=== The Legend of Spyro reboot trilogy (2006–08) ===
The Legend of Spyro is a game trilogy that is part of the Spyro the Dragon series. It acted as a reboot to the original series. The games use a combination of close-combat and platforming gameplay, though the gameplay is more oriented towards combat than previous games in the Spyro series were. The story revolves around Spyro, the protagonist, and his efforts to stop Malefor, The Dark Master, from destroying the world.

The first installment of this game is titled The Legend of Spyro: A New Beginning. It focuses on Spyro's origins as a legendary purple dragon and his quest to stop Cynder, the black dragon waging war against the world. He meets Ignitus the Fire Guardian, a red dragon who tells him about his past and offers to train him in his newly discovered ability to breathe fire. Spyro must then embark on a quest to various worlds to rescue the other three Guardians; Volteer, the Electric Guardian, Cyril, the Ice Guardian, and Terrador, the Earth Guardian. Each guardian trains him in a new elemental breath to help him on his journey and eventual fight with Cynder herself.

Michael Graham, one of Sierra Entertainment producers of The Legend of Spyro trilogy, stated that they never planned to do a trilogy. They developed top line concepts for a story arc that they felt could potentially span over three games, yet no actual plans were made beyond A New Beginning, so they did not know if the story would continue.

On October 25, 2007, it was announced that the film rights for Spyro the Dragon had been purchased by The Animation Picture Company. Daniel and Steven Altiere wrote the script, which was going to be based on the recently released The Legend of Spyro trilogy. The film was going to be titled The Legend of Spyro 3D and was planned to be made from Los Angeles, California, with animation by a South Korean animation studio, Wonderworld Studios. The film was planned to be produced by John Davis, Dan Chuba, Mark A.Z. Dippé, Brian Manis, and Ash Shah, and distributed by Universal Pictures. Mark A.Z. Dippé was going to direct the film, which would've made it the first theatrical film Dippe directed since Spawn. This film was originally planned for released in theaters on Christmas 2009 for the United States and Canada, but it was delayed to April 10, 2010, for its North American release. It was later confirmed by Daniel Altiere that the movie had been cancelled due to decisions made by Activision (now part of the larger Xbox division) to go in a different direction, which was later revealed in the form of Skylanders.

=== Spyro Reignited Trilogy and Spyro: A Realm Beyond (2018–present) ===
Discussions around the relaunch of Spyro began as early as 2014. In a July 2014 interview with The Daily Telegraph, Sony Computer Entertainment CEO, Andrew House stated that his team was considering bringing Spyro back. House stated that he believed video gamers would be interested in revisiting a character from their youth. Later that same year, Insomniac Games CEO Ted Price also stated that making a new Spyro game was a possibility. In 2017, developer Vicarious Visions stated that they were aware of how high the popular demand was for a revival of the classic Spyro series. In a statement they said, "just keep asking". Spyro Reignited Trilogy was officially announced on 5 April 2018 and was originally going to be released on 21 September 2018 for PlayStation 4 and Xbox One, before being delayed to 13 November 2018. The game was developed by Toys for Bob and was ported to Microsoft Windows and Nintendo Switch, with a release date of 3 September 2019.

During the Xbox Games Showcase on June 7, 2026, a brand-new Spyro game, titled Spyro: A Realm Beyond, was announced. It is being developed by Toys for Bob, and is currently set to be released in 2027.

=== Other games ===
In addition to Crash Purple and Spyro Orange, Spyro has made various crossover appearances in the Crash Bandicoot series. Spyro appears as a playable character in the Game Boy Advance version of Crash Nitro Kart, and makes a cameo appearance in Crash Twinsanity. The characters Spyro, Cynder, Dark Spyro, Sparx the Dragonfly and Malefor also made appearances in the Skylanders series, including all six mainline games and the television series. Elements from the Spyro series were added to Crash Team Racing Nitro-Fueled as part of a post-launch game update in August 2019. Spyro, Hunter, and Gnasty Gnorc appear as playable characters, along with Spyro-themed karts and a "Spyro Circuit" race track. Spyro-themed parade and pool floats appear in Crash Bandicoot 4: It's About Time, while both Spyro and Dark Spyro have major roles in Crash Bandicoot: On the Run! Spyro, Elora and Ripto made appearances as playable characters in season 3 of Crash Team Rumble.

=== Cancelled games ===
Spyro Ever After was going to be the first Spyro educational game where Spyro meets fairy tale characters like The Three Little Pigs, Little Red Riding Hood, Puss in Boots, Goldilocks and the Three Bears and Golden Goose. However, the game never passed the storyboard, and was cancelled.

Agent 9 was a James Bond-like parody spin-off game starring Agent 9 as the main character as he does spy missions. It was set to be developed by Blue Tongue Entertainment and Backbone Entertainment and be published by Universal Interactive. The game's production was cancelled for undisclosed reasons.

After the cancellation of Agent 9, Digital Eclipse reworked the game into a full Spyro the Dragon title, that took place in a large desert environment. The video game title was never released to the market, and was scrapped by Digital Eclipse.

A crossover game with the Crash Bandicoot series was considered by Toys for Bob, the developer of Crash Bandicoot 4: It's About Time. In reports surfaced in 2024, the game was canceled in the early stage of development by Activision, which found Crash Bandicoot 4's sales underwhelming and preferred to publish live-service multiplayer games.

== List of games ==
Game	Developer	Release year	Platform
Spyro the Dragon	Insomniac Games	1998	PlayStation
Spyro 2: Ripto's Rage!	Insomniac Games	1999	PlayStation
Spyro: Year of the Dragon	Insomniac Games	2000	PlayStation
Spyro: Season of Ice	Digital Eclipse	2001	Game Boy Advance
Spyro 2: Season of Flame	Digital Eclipse	2002	Game Boy Advance
Spyro: Enter the Dragonfly	Equinoxe Digital Entertainment; Check Six Studios	2002	PlayStation 2 GameCube
Spyro: Attack of the Rhynocs	Digital Eclipse	2003	Game Boy Advance
Spyro Orange: The Cortex Conspiracy	Vicarious Visions	2004	Game Boy Advance
Spyro: A Hero's Tail	Eurocom	2004	PlayStation 2 GameCube; Xbox
Spyro: Ripto Quest	Kaolink	2004	Java ME
Spyro the Dragon	Kaolink	2005	Java ME
Spyro: Shadow Legacy	Amaze Entertainment	2005	Nintendo DS
The Legend of Spyro: A New Beginning	Krome Studios	2006	PlayStation 2 GameCube; Xbox
The Legend of Spyro: A New Beginning	The Mighty Troglodytes	2006	J2ME
The Legend of Spyro: A New Beginning	Big Ant Studios	2006	Game Boy Advance
The Legend of Spyro: A New Beginning	Amaze Entertainment	2006	Nintendo DS
The Legend of Spyro: The Eternal Night	Krome Studios; Big Ant Studios	2007	PlayStation 2 Wii
The Legend of Spyro: The Eternal Night	The Mighty Troglodytes	2007	J2ME
The Legend of Spyro: The Eternal Night	Amaze Entertainment	2007	Nintendo DS
The Legend of Spyro: The Eternal Night	Amaze Entertainment	2007	Game Boy Advance
The Legend of Spyro: Dawn of the Dragon	Étranges Libellules	2008	PlayStation 2 Wii; PlayStation 3 Xbox 360
The Legend of Spyro: Dawn of the Dragon	The Mighty Troglodytes	2008	J2ME
The Legend of Spyro: Dawn of the Dragon	Tantalus Media	2008	Nintendo DS
Spyro Reignited Trilogy	Toys for Bob	2018	PlayStation 4 Xbox One; Nintendo Switch; Windows
Spyro: A Realm Beyond	Toys for Bob	2027	PlayStation 5 Xbox Series X/S; Nintendo Switch 2 Windows

== Common elements ==
=== Characters ===
The main character of the series is Spyro the Dragon, a young purple dragon. In the original series, he is accompanied by Sparx, a dragonfly that performs many functions such as helping protect Spyro from damage and collecting gems. Most of the games before the Legend of Spyro series include Hunter the Cheetah, a loyal friend of Spyro's who sometimes helps him on quests; Moneybags, a money-obsessed bear who in some games is needed to make pathways for Spyro for a small fee; and Zoe, a fairy who serves as checkpoints in each land that Spyro visits.

=== Locations ===
The Dragon Realms are the main setting of the series where most of the dragons including Spyro live. Avalar is a separate world that was being threatened by Ripto in Spyro: Ripto's Rage. The Forgotten Realms are the ancient home of the dragons before being driven out by the Sorceress and serve as the setting for Spyro: Year of the Dragon. The Fairy Realms are a separate series of realms that are inhabited by fairies and only appear in Spyro: Season of Ice. After collecting enough orbs in Spyro 2: Riptos Rage, the Dragon Shores can be accessed, which has games and a special power-up for Spyro.

=== Collectibles ===
A large part of the original series revolves around item collection. When the player collects a certain amount of items, they can move on to the next area. The most common of these are gems, which are often used not only for collecting, but also for buying skills, passageways, items, and more. In A Hero's Tail there were special dark gems, which the player had to destroy to proceed to new areas within the game, while collecting light gems allowed use of some of the professor's inventions and opened certain doors.

Freeing dragons is the main goal in Spyro the Dragon, while retrieving dragon eggs is the main goal in Spyro: Year of the Dragon. In Spyro the Dragon, dragon eggs are also collected by chasing down thieves (but their color designs are different from those of the third installment). They also appear in Spyro: A Hero's Tail, and collecting them will unlock concept art. Collecting Talismans and Orbs are the primary goal in Spyro 2: Ripto's Rage!, as the devices are used in a portal to get Spyro back to his home. Dragonflies are the primary collectibles in Spyro: Enter the Dragonfly where Spyro catches them using his bubble breath. In Spyro: Season of Ice freeing fairies is the main goal, and in Spyro 2: Season of Flame collecting fireflies is the goal.

== Music ==
Stewart Copeland composed the soundtracks for the first four Spyro games. Copeland made music for each world in the games as well as music devoted to each level, often playing each level so he could tailor the mood of the music to the level. As with the voice cast in A Hero's Tail, Stewart Copeland was replaced and the soundtrack was composed by Steve Duckworth and Paul Lawler. Rebecca Kneubuhl and Gabriel Mann of the a cappella band Spiralmouth composed the music for The Legend of Spyro trilogy. Finally, for Reignited Trilogy, Copeland's music was remixed in-house by the developer and remained mostly faithful to the original scores; Copeland himself composed a main theme for the compilation.

== Reception ==
Aggregate review scores
Game	Metacritic
Spyro the Dragon	(PS1) 85% (Note: GameRankings score)
Spyro 2: Ripto's Rage!	(PS1) 87%
Spyro: Year of the Dragon	(PS1) 91/100
Spyro: Season of Ice	(GBA) 74/100
Spyro 2: Season of Flame	(GBA) 76/100
Spyro: Enter the Dragonfly	(GC) 48/100 (PS2) 56/100
Spyro: Attack of the Rhynocs	(GBA) 72/100
Crash Bandicoot Purple and Spyro Orange	(GBA) 60/100
Spyro: A Hero's Tail	(GC) 62/100 (PS2) 60/100 (Xbox) 64/100
Spyro: Shadow Legacy	(NDS) 50/100
The Legend of Spyro: A New Beginning	(Xbox) 69/100 (NDS) 68/100 (GC) 67/100 (PS2) 64/100 (GBA) 44/100
The Legend of Spyro: The Eternal Night	(GBA) 80/100 (Wii) 60/100 (NDS) 56/100 (PS2) 54/100
The Legend of Spyro: Dawn of the Dragon	(Wii) 64/100 (X360) 62/100 (PS3) 59/100 (NDS) 57/100
Spyro Reignited Trilogy	(NS) 79/100 (PC) 75/100 (PS4) 82/100 (XONE) 83/100

As of 2007, the Spyro the Dragon series has sold over 20 million units worldwide. According to the Los Angeles Times, the first Spyro game has sold over 4.8 million units worldwide as of November 2007 making it the seventeenth best-selling PlayStation game of all time, Ripto's Rage! sold 3.45 million units and Year of the Dragon sold 3.28 million units.

Critical reception of the games was mixed. IGN was highly impressed by A New Beginning, citing its story, voice acting, and controls as major positives. At one point, they compared the game to God of War. GameSpot, on the other hand, wasn't impressed, calling the story dull, the gameplay repetitive, and the levels uninspired.

The Eternal Night was not as well received. IGN called the game "pointlessly difficult," citing an unresponsive jump button during platforming segments and "unfair" combat mechanics. GameSpot also complained about the high difficulty, saying that the game's "Dragon Time" was required to simply stay alive. Game Chronicles was kinder; while they did not like the game's lack of precision or its difficulty, and really did not like some of the acting, they also said that a patient player would find a lot about the game to like, particularly the production values.

Dawn of the Dragon was better received than the previous two. IGN said that while the gameplay was still repetitive, the flight mechanic and other new features were welcome additions. GameZone was unimpressed by the game's graphics and multiplayer, but referred to the production values, including score and voice acting, as "epic."
