= Manabu Ino =

Japanese actor and voice actor (born 1972)

Manabu Ino 猪野 学
- Born: October 7, 1972 (age 53); Mie Prefecture, Japan
- Occupations: Actor, voice actor
- Years active: 1996-present

Manabu Ino (猪野 学, Ino Manabu; born October 7, 1972 in Mie Prefecture) is a Japanese actor and voice actor.

He is known for acting in several live action films and known for Japanese voice-dubbing Peter Parker/Spider-Man in Spider-Man: The New Animated Series, as well as dubbing Tobey Maguire's role as Peter Parker/Spider-Man in through the Spider-Man film trilogy as well as in the Japanese-released Spider-Man video games based on the films, and continued to dub Peter Parker/Spider-Man in The Spectacular Spider-Man animated series.

== Filmography ==
=== Film ===
- Jigyaku no Uta (2007) (Tallow role)

=== Television ===
- Abarenbō Shōgun (2000) (Episode 19)
- Tiger & Dragon (2005) (Meguro Wolf) (Episode 9)
- Kōmyō ga Tsuji (2006) (Hosokawa Tadaoki)
- Tomica Hero Rescue Fire (2010) (Fukushima)
- Segodon (2018) (Kikkawa Kenmotsu)
- The 13 Lords of the Shogun (2022) (Anzai Kagemasu)

=== Television animation ===
- Detective Conan (1996) (Keiichi Naruse)
- In the Beginning: The Bible Stories (1997) (Moses (Childhood))
- Arc the Land (1999) (Jean)

=== Games ===
- Lego Marvel Super Heroes (Japanese-dubbed version) (Spider-Man)
- Spider-Man (2002 video game) (Japanese-dubbed version) (Peter Parker/Spider-Man)
- Spider-Man 2 (Japanese-dubbed version) (Peter Parker/Spider-Man)
- Spider-Man 3 (Japanese-dubbed version) (Peter Parker/Spider-Man)

=== Dubbing ===
==== Live-action ====
- 500 Days of Summer (Tom Hansen (Joseph Gordon-Levitt))
- Band of Brothers (Private John Hall (Andrew Scott))
- Broken Arrow (2002 TV Asahi edition) (Riley Hale Christian Slater))
- Catch Me If You Can (Frank William Abagnale, Jr. (Leonardo DiCaprio))
- Clockstoppers (Zak Gibbs (Jesse Bradford))
- Donnie Darko (Donnie Darko (Jake Gyllenhaal))
- Fear and Loathing in Las Vegas (2014 Blu-ray and DVD edition) (The Hitchhiker (Tobey Maguire))
- FlashForward (FBI Special Agent Demetri Noh (John Cho))
- Joint Security Area (Pvt. Chǒng U-jin (Shin Ha-kyun))
- Pecker (Matt (Brendan Sexton III))
- Pitch Black (William Jones (Cole Hauser))
- Saving Private Ryan (Unknown dubbing voice role) (2002, TV Asahi, Sunday Movie Theater edition)
- Spider-Man film series
  - Spider-Man (Peter Parker/Spider-Man (Tobey Maguire))
  - Spider-Man 2 (Peter Parker/Spider-Man (Tobey Maguire))
  - Spider-Man 3 (Peter Parker/Spider-Man (Tobey Maguire))
  - Spider-Man: No Way Home (Peter Parker/Spider-Man (Tobey Maguire))
- Star Trek: Nemesis (Shinzon (Tom Hardy))
- Star Wars Episode IV: A New Hope (Unknown dubbing voice role) (Nippon TV, Roadshow Friday edition (Special Edition))
- The Cider House Rules (Wally Worthington (Paul Rudd))
- The Immortal (Goodwin (Steve Braun))
- The Nutty Professor (Additional Japanese dubbing voice) (2000 Nippon TV, Roadshow Friday edition)
- The Scam (Kang Hyun-soo (Park Yong-ha †))
- So Little Time (Larry Slotnick (Jesse Head))
- Total Recall (McLean (John Cho))
- Trance (Simon (James McAvoy))
- Unfaithful (Paul Martel (Olivier Martinez))
- The Way of the Gun (Parker (Ryan Phillippe))
- Winter Sonata (Kim Sang-hyeok (Park Yong-ha))
- Y Tu Mamá También (Tenoch Iturbide (Diego Luna))

==== Animation ====
- Lilo & Stitch (David Kawena)
- Spider-Man: The New Animated Series (Peter Parker/Spider-Man)
- The Spectacular Spider-Man (Peter Parker/Spider-Man)
