= Spyro: Enter the Dragonfly =

2002 video game

- North American PlayStation 2 cover art
- Developers: Equinoxe Digital Entertainment; Check Six Studios
- Publisher: Universal Interactive
- Directors: Aryeh Richmond; Ricci Rukavina
- Producer: Ricci Rukavina
- Designers: Saji A. Johnson; Joel Goodsell
- Programmers: Jean-Marc Morel; John Bojorquez
- Artist: Sean Ro
- Writers: Tim Yanalunas; Russell Bernau
- Composer: Stewart Copeland
- Series: Spyro
- Platforms: PlayStation 2; GameCube
- Release: PlayStation 2: NA: November 5, 2002; EU: November 29, 2002; GameCube: NA: November 19, 2002; EU: November 29, 2002
- Genres: Platform, action-adventure
- Mode: Single-player

Spyro: Enter the Dragonfly is a 2002 platform game developed by Equinoxe Digital Entertainment and Check Six Studios and published by Universal Interactive for the PlayStation 2 and GameCube. The first mainline installment in the Spyro series not to be developed by original developer Insomniac Games, it follows the titular purple dragon as he attempts to rescue magical dragonflies from the clutches of Ripto. Similarly to its predecessors, the gameplay is based around exploring large open-ended 3D environments in order to find collectibles, which can also be obtained through minigames. Xbox and PC versions were planned but cancelled.

Spyro: Enter the Dragonfly received generally negative reviews from critics due to its short length, poor controls, sluggish performance, and numerous technical issues, though its soundtrack was praised. It was followed by the release of Spyro: A Hero's Tail by Eurocom in 2004.

== Gameplay ==
Spyro is able to use his bubble breath to capture dragonflies.

The player controls Spyro the dragon, who is accompanied by his dragonfly partner Sparx. Spyro is able to breathe fire, charge, glide, hover, and swim. New to the series is the introduction of multiple breath attacks, such as bubble breath, ice breath, and electric breath. Spyro is also able to learn a block technique which can be used to deflect ranged attacks back at enemies. These abilities are attained from the ancient dragon statue in the home world by collecting magical runes. Additionally, some levels involve the operation of aircraft or other vehicles.

== Plot ==
The story begins during a rite of passage for a group of dragon hatchlings, which were the dragon eggs in Year of the Dragon.

Each hatchling is meant to receive a dragonfly partner of their own, but Ripto, who was the antagonist of Ripto's Rage, disrupts the event. He makes his unexpected appearance through a magical portal, along with his henchmen in an attempt to capture all of the dragonflies, thus weakening the power of every dragon and thereby get his revenge upon Spyro. His spell misfires, however, and the dragonflies become scattered throughout the Dragon Realms.

Spyro must then recover the dragonflies by capturing them using his bubble breath ability and by completing tasks for NPCs. After collecting all of the lost dragonflies, Spyro fights and defeats Ripto, who retreats to his homeland.

== Development ==
Upon completion of the original Spyro trilogy for the Sony PlayStation, the original developer Insomniac Games ceased production on the franchise and moved onto developing the Ratchet & Clank games. After the publishing agreement between Sony Computer Entertainment and Universal Interactive Studios ended in April 2000, Universal Interactive, who owned the Spyro intellectual property, was consolidated into Havas Interactive the following year, becoming a publishing label within the company and announced plans to bring an original Spyro game to the Xbox, PlayStation 2, PC, and Game Boy Advance. Universal contracted two California-based studios to develop the game: Equinoxe Digital Entertainment, responsible for the game's art, and Check Six Studios, who handled its design and programming.

Joel Goodsell, a game designer who had previously worked on the Disney Interactive Studios titles Gargoyles and Toy Story 2: Buzz Lightyear to the Rescue, joined the project after seeing a Spyro-themed demo they developed. Goodsell served as the original project lead and felt that Spyro needed a "tone update" going from PS1 to PS2. The developers initially created a darker, more adult take on Spyro, integrating steampunk visuals into the design and art. Based on Universal's feedback, the game was rewritten to be more traditional, with a plot involving Gnasty Gnorc and Ripto, antagonists from the previous games, teaming up and demanding revenge on Spyro. Universal replied that the game was "just a standard Spyro game design", asking what was special about it. Goodsell then wrote "an epic Zelda-esque RPG-lite Spyro design" including a hub-town and surrounding open world field with changing seasons. Universal signed off on this design in January 2002, leaving no feedback. Spyro: Enter the Dragonfly for the PS2 was unveiled on February 19, 2002, at Vivendi Universal Games' First Annual Games Fair in France; a GameCube version was confirmed in July.

The game was originally going to have 25 levels. Although this is fewer than the amount of levels in the previous Spyro games, the levels were going to be noticeably larger than the levels in previous Spyro games. In addition, it was planned to have around 120 dragonflies that players had to collect.

Several months into the game's development, Check Six and Equinoxe moved into a single office space in Venice, California. The game struggled with low frame rates, even as the visuals were simplified. Check Six had difficulty paying their developers, missing paychecks, and the team was also pressured to release the game in time for the Christmas season. Goodsell felt that having two directors on the team, including Ricci Rukavina of Universal Interactive, hurt the team's morale and was a drain on Check Six's limited financial resources; he subsequently left the studio.

Stewart Copeland, composer of the previous three Spyro games as well as Enter the Dragonfly, stated he started to feel a "divergence" with Universal Interactive, stating "I remember the team came in to create the promotional materials for Enter the Dragonfly. They showed me an ad they had, which I didn't even recognize as Spyro. It was country and western-themed, and I think that's where the divergence happened for me. We were not on the same page any more."

Spyro: Enter the Dragonfly was the only game developed by Check Six and Equinoxe before they closed down. Check Six was working on Aliens: Colonial Marines concurrently with Spyro, which was cancelled due to performance and production issues. Equinoxe developed a prototype for a Nintendo game "that had a lot of promise, but Nintendo elected to not continue funding it after one particular milestone."

== Reception ==
Reception

Aggregate score
Aggregator	Score	
Aggregator	GameCube	PS2
Metacritic	48/100	56/100

Review scores
Publication	Score	
Publication	GameCube	PS2
Game Informer	4.75/10	N/A
GamePro	2.5/5	4.5/5
GameSpot	3.2/10	2.8/10
GameSpy	N/A	2/5
GameZone	7.5/10	7/10
IGN	6/10	6/10
Nintendo Power	3.3/5	N/A
Nintendo World Report	4/10	N/A
Official U.S. PlayStation Magazine	N/A	3/5
X-Play	N/A	2/5

The PlayStation 2 version of the game received "mixed or average" reviews and the GameCube version received "generally unfavorable" reviews, according to the review aggregation website Metacritic.

IGN said of the PS2 version, "Enter the Dragonfly is essentially a replica game, a side step or a lateral move rather than a step forward. So, what it comes down to is this: Are you up for more of the exact same Spyro game?" Ted Price, the President of Insomniac Games, even spoke out about how bad he found the game. In an interview, he stated, "Spyro has become an abused stepchild... Spyro: Enter the Dragonfly on PS2 and GameCube was an absolute travesty."

A large body of criticism for the game was caused by its numerous bugs and glitches. Some reviewers speculated that this was caused by a rushed development cycle to reach a scheduled release date. Matthew Gallant, writing for GameSpot, said, "Even the biggest fans of Spyro are going to have a hard time enjoying this game. The leap to the latest generation of consoles leaves them with a slower game, a shorter game (10 hours), and an all-around less enjoyable game, not to mention a buggy one."

Another criticism of the game was the frame rate. Ben Kosmina of Nintendo World Report said, "While running around the Dragon Realms (the overworld of the game) if there's too many sheep or moving characters on screen, the game will skip frames excessively. It also happens while running or flying through levels where there are a lot of characters, and even sometimes when there aren't any characters in the area! This is just unacceptable." IGN shared this complaint, adding "The framerate suffers often, chugging from around a maximum of 30 fps downward, depending on the area. Which is kind of strange, because these worlds aren't much bigger than those on the PlayStation versions of Spyro. There aren't many more enemies on screen, and the textures are still the same, simple flat shaded swaths of primary colours, just like the others. Oftentimes, entire areas pop in because of weird problems with load issues." According to an IGN article from March 2002, the game was originally going to have a frame rate of 60 fps despite it having more animation, more interactive architecture bits, and a noticeably greater draw distance than the previous Spyro games.

Critics also had issues with control and collision detection. Kosmina mentioned, "Due to the awful control you have over Spyro when he's flying, you'll be plummeting off cliffs, missing switches you're trying to ground pound, swerving all over the place while trying to land properly and falling off small platforms for no reason at all."

The GameCube version was a runner-up for the "Worst Game on GameCube" award at GameSpot's Best and Worst of 2002 Awards, which went to Jeremy McGrath Supercross World.

The PlayStation 2 version received a "Platinum" sales award from the Entertainment and Leisure Software Publishers Association (ELSPA), indicating sales of at least 300,000 units in the UK.

== Legal issues ==
On March 28, 2007, a lawsuit was filed against Universal, Check Six, Equinoxe and Sony by the parents of a child who suffered epileptic seizures after playing Enter the Dragonfly.
