= Spyro: A Hero's Tail =

2004 video game

- Developer: Eurocom Entertainment Software
- Publisher: Vivendi Universal Games (Note: Released under the Sierra Entertainment brand name in PAL regions.)
- Producers: Jon Williams; Suzanne Watson
- Designers: Terry Lloyd; Phillip Bennett
- Programmer: Dave Pridmore
- Artist: Matt Dixon
- Writer: J. Stewart Burns
- Composers: Guy Cockcroft; Steve Duckworth; Keith Leary
- Series: Spyro
- Engine: EngineX
- Platforms: PlayStation 2 GameCube; Xbox
- Release: NA: 2 November 2004; EU: 16 November 2004 (PS2); EU: 19 November 2004 (Xbox); EU: 26 November 2004 (GC)
- Genres: Platform, action-adventure
- Mode: Single-player

Spyro: A Hero's Tail is a 2004 platform game developed by Eurocom Entertainment Software and published by Vivendi Universal Games for the PlayStation 2, GameCube, and Xbox. It is the fifth console game in the original Spyro series and the ninth game in the series overall. Per usual, players act as the titular dragon collecting objects, platforming, flying, headbutting and breathing fire onto enemies to save the Dragon Realms. This time, he collects Dark Gems, which corrupt the land with maniacal creatures and deadly plants, planted by a banished Dragon Elder Red. Other characters, such as Sparx the Dragonfly, Hunter the Cheetah, Sgt. Byrd the Penguin, and newcomer Blink the Mole, are playable in minigame stages.

Development began in early November 2002 under the working title Spyro: The Dark Realms and was announced by Vivendi to be completed on 4 October 2004; the final title was decided by the publisher in early 2004. The game was produced by Suzanne Watson and Jon Williams, who explained that the goal was simply "to create a game that was in keeping with the franchise," with acknowledgement of the problems of the critically panned previous entry Spyro: Enter the Dragonfly. The earlier games, particularly their promotional renders, were referenced so that the art style was suitable with the series universe. Jak and Daxter also influenced the creation of the polygons and textures, choice of lighting methods, and style of cutscenes.

Spyro: A Hero's Tail garnered generally mixed reviews from professional critics. They agreed it was a significant improvement over Enter the Dragonfly, but argued its low difficulty meant only young gamers would enjoy it. They positively commented on the graphics, responsive controls, and incorporation of changing environments when Dark Gems are collected. However, they were disappointed in its lack of innovation and overemphasis on collecting, and had differing opinions on the minigame sections.

== Gameplay ==
Spyro near one of the game's Dark Gems, which corrupt the land to power a banished Elder Dragon Red. Collecting them frees a part of the land from its influence, altering the environment.

Spyro: A Hero's Tail is a 3D platform game where the player collects a variety of objects, destroys walls and rocks, solves puzzles, plays mini-games, and fight pattern-based bosses that take three hits to kill in three stages. Typical of the series, it involves the titular purple dragon saving the Dragon Realms from danger. This time, he collects Dark Gems, planted by the former Elder Dragon Red, who was banished from the Realms. They corrupt the land with maniacal creatures and deadly plants, draining life out of its environment to power Red. The gameplay is also largely the same, where Spyro jumps on platforms, flies, head-butts into enemies, and wanders around collecting gems. His Fire, Ice and Electricity breath attacks return, although must be purchased from Moneybags, and are used to solve puzzles. However, he has new several abilities, such as ledge grabbing, wall kicking, horn diving into enemies while flying, and swinging his tail like a lasso, and a new Water breath attack. Specific moves cannot be performed until an Elder Dragon teaches them.

The player traverses a variety of settings, such as colourful towns, dark lava-filled caves and snowy mountains. They have save points, represented by Zoe, who now can save both the player's current position in an area and overall game progress. Collecting the dark gems restores what the environments initially were. Transformations include flowers growing, frozen waterfalls warming and turning back into lakes, dilapidated bridges rebuilding, and gems being clean of purple goo. In addition to the Dark Gems, Spyro obtains Light Gems, colourful dragon eggs, and multi-coloured gems of varying value. Light Gems open locked doors to new areas and power-up the gadgets. The dragon eggs open entrances to minigame sections and unlock the game's concept art when returned to their owner Nanny Dragon. The coloured gems are currency for products from Moneybags' shop. Objects are obtained by killing enemies (such as Gnorcs), unlocking gates, opening wicker baskets, smashing treasure chests, completing minigames, and performing tasks such as breaking down hidden walls. The game's early enemies can be destroyed by breathing fire on them, but later ones must be killed in specific ways. Crabs, for example, can only be killed by using the Electricity breath.

In minigame sections, the player acts as other characters, such as three returns from previous games—Hunter the Cheetah, Sgt. Byrd the rocket-propelled Penguin, and Sparx the Dragonfly—and a newcomer, Blink the Mole. Hunter the Cheetah can shoot with his bow, which he can also turn into a shield by spinning it, stomp on enemies midair and pull off combos of punches and kicks. Two types of arrows can be shot from the bow: standard and fire, the latter being limited in supply. His long legs provide him more jumping height than Spyro, making him useful for platforms the purple dragon cannot jump or fly up to. He also can walk upright and double-jump. The penguin Sgt. Byrd is able to fly and shoot missiles and bombs, his sections requiring the player to shoot at a number of targets under a time limit. Blink the Mole is armed with lasers and explosives, as well as a helmet to duck in, and is for reaching areas inaccessible for Spyro, with climbing and burrowing abilities. Sparx flies in rail shooter race minigames.

The Professor built four gadgets that Spyro uses: a glass ball a la Super Monkey Ball that he rolls in to move up slopes, a teleporter that warps to various areas of the Dragon Realms, one for temporary invincibility, and a Super Charge gadget that, for a limited amount of time, provides Spyro more strength and speed. Moneybags' shop, in addition to breath attacks, contains ammunition that increase their power, magazines that allow for more charges and blasts to be held, and a shock wave that increases the radius of the horn dive. The shop also sells lockpicks to open doors and gates, a chain that holds three lockpicks at a time, a multiplier that doubles the value of the coloured gems, a butterfly jar that restores Spyro's health, and an extra health unit.

== Development ==
=== Workflow ===
Spyro: A Hero's Tail was developed by Eurocom, specifically the team of Harry Potter and the Chamber of Secrets. The project's producer Jon Williams was first informed by Vivendi about the possibility of working on a Spyro game in early October 2002, and Eurocom and Vivendi had their first conference on 11 November. He co-produced the game with Suzanne Watson. A skeleton team of the leads kickstarted development in early November, before it expanded with additional programmers and artists as was the case with other Eurocom projects. Some design proposals were sent to the publisher in late October, before "real" Design and Technical Design documents were provided in early 2003. The working title was Spyro: The Dark Realms, before Vivendi decided on Spyro: A Hero's Tail in early 2004. Williams explained that the goal was simply "to create a game that was in keeping with the franchise," with criticisms of the critically panned previous entry Spyro: Enter the Dragonfly acknowledged. On 4 October 2004, Vivendi Universal Games announced development was completed.

Development consisted of Vivendi setting milestones for when Eurocom needed to complete demos, which the Universal publisher provided input to. Most of the Eurocom projects, in Williams' time at the company which started in the 1990s, were film tie-ins or games of well-established franchises. This meant they had lots of commands and strict deadlines from publishers and film studios at once, resulting in what he called nightmarish development environments. He more positively reflects on Spyro: A Hero's Tail, which he considered one of Eurocom's better projects in terms of collaboration between developer and publisher. He described it as "very professional and we never had any major fall outs." Particular praise was given by Williams and lead artist and concept artist Matt Dixon towards the support from Vivendi Universal producer Caroline Trujillo.

=== Programming and design ===
Spyro: A Hero's Tail was designed by Terry Lloyd and Phill Bennett, and programmed by Dave Pridmore, Andy Brown, Daniel Secker, John Stephens, Kristoffer Adock, Mark Topley, Matt Partridge, Narinder Singh Basran and Stuart Johnson. From the start, the developers were influenced by Jak and Daxter, attempting to emulate the series' detail in polygons and textures, lightning methods, and style of cutscenes. Spyro: A Hero's Tail was produced with EngineX, in what was the first time Eurocom had multiple in-progress projects using the same engine. It was programmed by Chris Jackson, Ian Denny, Tim Rogers, Andy Hutchings, Ashley Finney, Dave Looker, Green Jam Canal, Kevin Grantham, Kevin Stainwright, Mark Gornall, Peter Livingstone, Shane Clark, Steve Robinson, and Steven Walker. Andy Mitchell, Bob Smith, Diego Garcia Huerta, Jim Makin, Kev Marks, Kevin Thacker, and Mark Duffill programmed the development kit's other tools.

Although Williams explained any technical issues the developers faced were expected, production was complicated by the fact that the engine was still being written by its programmers, who at the same time also had to fix software bugs and glitches for another team. The technical issue primarily focused on was loading, particularly the game doing so on three consoles of different hardware. The development systems took very long to load, making predicating the load time on a console precarious. Flying sections that connected the Realms together, which ultimately paved the way for minigames, were scrapped due to loading issues. The emphasis on performance also meant low polygons for several characters, and most of the polygon detail being on the lead characters.

In order for multiple programmers to work on a level, test maps like Test_AB and Test_JP were created for them to produce assets and experiment with mechanics. These would be imported into the main level map once completed. Although these were not meant to be in the released product, they are accessible via cheat codes and file-swapping. Williams suggests the development environment was so hectic it was not caught being in the code. Two other maps, hogwarts.edb (a model of the Harry Potter location of the same name) and maptest.edb, are also on the disc. Williams does not remember the definite reason for their usage, but suspected it was so the team could start working on concepts before Eurocom's switch to EngineX. The Scanmode Enable feature, selectable in the debug menu, was used to bypass collision so that developers could see the full level.

=== Graphics ===
Matt Dixon was lead artist and concept artist, Steve Bramford was the lead character artist. Amanda Barlow, Clive K. Stevenson, Gary Baker, Henk Nieborg, Jon Parr, Matt Farrell and Phil Dobson were also artists on the project. The animation team consisted of Almudean Soria Sancho, Antonio Palermo, Brian Riordan, Des Forde, Mark Jackson, Mark Povey, Jon Maine, Kenny Beard, Owen Flanagan, Phil Hanks, and Santiago Colomo Martinez. In addition to Bamford, Drew Kerins, Michael Lindsay, Oscar Fuertes Garcia, Phill Plunkett, and Steven Gratton modeled the characters.

The characters and environments were designed, modeled and textured quickly. Each new character began with Bamford, for one-to-two hours, drawing a basic sketch based on a vague summary written by the game designers. The rudimentary style of the characters was a result of Bramford's lack of experience as a concept artist. Modelling, which was done with LightWave 3D, took one-to-three days, and texturing, the same part of the process where the colours and details were conceived, took three-to-five. Finally, scripts were written by Ramford for character rigging and skinning, which took one-to-two hours for each character. Dixon explained a similar process for the environments. Simple sketches providing a general idea of the shape and style were done in under an hour, before 12–24 hours was spent conceiving the colours and feel.

Previous games were referenced for creating the graphics. Promo renders of the earlier entries were referenced to make the characters' style still suitable to the series' universe, while Dixon looked at the environments of those games to see how they could "evolve a little." With a decrease of angularity from the original PlayStation to the PlayStation 2, the fully rounded marketing renders were extremely useful. The developers had the most artistic liberty in character personality and design with the coloured dragons. Vivendi's only request was to keep their bipedalism.

Before the textures were finalized, Ramford created temporary swatch textures for characters, simply so the designer and programmers could add them to the levels. The swatch-textured characters were in some demos. Gratton, who textured Spyro, originally planned for his purple colour to match that of the previous games. However, he and Bramford agreed it was too "muddy" and analogous to grime on an oil painting, so he was slightly more saturated in the final product. Ramford's initial colour palette for Blink was red, white, blue and amber, taking inspiration from that of the titular character of Billy Hatcher and the Giant Egg. For a softer look that was appropriate for the setting and in the style of The Goonies, Blink had added to him a backpack, his shoes changed from Converse boots to Timberlands, and his colours were altered to purple, blue, green and amber. A fez was added to Moneybags to give him the look of a shoekeeper at a bazaar, inspired by a perceived Arabic feel of Spyro's home. The fictional Bengal tiger Shere Khan from Disney's animated film The Jungle Book was the inspiration for Dragon Elder Titan.

=== Audio ===
Eurocom's Guy Cockcroft initially recorded and composed the music, heard in some of the game's demos. However, Vivendi, on 19 May 2004, decided to shift the responsibility of the music elsewhere, outsourcing another company for the soundtrack in the final game on 4 June. The reason was the long amount of time it took to respond with critiques towards Cockcroft's changes to the music, and the closer contact the publisher would have with an outsourced company. Game Audio Ltd, specifically Keith Leary, David Marsden, Paul Lawler, and Craig Sharmat, were the outsourced composers, although Cockcroft and another Eurocom composer, Steve Duckworth, are credited as well. Vivendi sent Eurocom the music from the end of June to August, a few updates to tracks made afterwards. The voice cast consists of Jess Harnell, Anndi McAfee, Tara Strong, Phil Crowley, Michael Gough, Brad Abrell, Susanne Blakeslee, Fred Tatasciore, André Sogliuzzo, and Drew Markham.

=== Rejected concepts ===
Sgt. Byrd and Hunter were first planned to be playable throughout the game, Byrd having to collect ammunition. However, for reasons Williams suspects to be related to scheduling and design problems, they were segregated to minigames where Sgt. Byrd had an infinite amount of bombs and missiles (in fact, he has 9,999, which is unlikely to run out during gameplay). The limited ammo was poorly received by testers, and thus changed. One of the non-player characters, Ember, was also planned to be a fully playable character at the same time, but the developers thought it was too much effort to create NPC interactions and alternate speech.

The level themes and the bosses associated with them, an early document labeling them "Electric / Water / Ice / Lava Serpent and Red," were decided early on. One of several ideas for a boss was the return of Ripto. Although most of the assets remained in the final product, the number of Realms was changed from five to four. The Fifth Realm, Secret Hideout, would have consisted of the Professor's Laboratory, Dark Mine, Red's Lair, and further minigames. Its assets were merged into the fourth Realm halfway through development. The name of Professor's Laboratory was changed to Red's Laboratory when Vivendi's localization department worked on translations, although the publisher has never publicly stated a rationale. The Gnasty Gnorc boss was much larger, split into three stages.

Frostbite Village initially had baby mammoths created by Phillip Bennett, as enemies, but these were removed for frame rate issues and Vivendi's disapproval of Spyro killing cute enemies. Another cut foe, seen in the demos and a test level on the disc, were sharks in Dragonfly Falls. In the demos, they chase after the player character, while in the test level, they pop out of the ground and instantly kill as a way to prevent players from going past certain points. Spyro, who can breathe underwater infinitely in the final game, initially needed a gadget, Aqualung, to do so, but issues with difficulty balancing resulted in it being scrapped in April 2004. Areas of toxic water were incorporated instead to make the underwater sections challenging, and the Professor's explanation for Aqualung became that for invincibility. The horn dive boulders, scrapped late in development, would have been filled with dragon eggs and Light Gems.

== Release and promotion ==
On 27 April 2004, Spyro: A Hero's Tail received its first public announcement by Vivendi Universal Games; its premise, Spyro's new attacks, and the additional player characters were revealed, as well as its release date set sometime in last quarter of 2004 for the GameCube, PlayStation 2, and Xbox. Emmy Award-winning The Simpsons and Futurama veteran J. Stewart Burns was also announced as writer. SCE Worldwide Studios executive vice president Michael Pole stated it was the dragon's "greatest adventure to date--an adventure game that immerses players into a deep storyline, [with] more-diverse, lush environments, and [that also] introduces a strong lineup of engaging characters." Two weeks later, it was presented at E3 2004, and the date was set to be sometime in November. Douglas C. Perry of IGN reported the game's target audience to be very young, its size to be four times as large as Enter the Dragonfly, and taking potentially twice as long to beat, 18–20 hours. On 18 May 2004, the game was rated E by the Entertainment Software Rating Board (ESRB) and had its first trailer unveiled. All console versions were then presented at the September 2004 Game Stars Live event in London, England.

Spyro: A Hero's Tail's only officially-released demos, solely for the PS2, were the E3 giveaway bundle with Crash Twinsanity and those in magazines. Days before its release, Spyro: A Hero's Tail received preview coverage in Cube and IGN. The Australian edition of PlayStation 2 Official Magazine, in its November 2004 issue, provided its readers a demo of Spyro: A Hero's Tail, where the main hub area, an egg-collecting mission, and minigame levels for Hunter and St. Byrd were playable. The game was released in North America on 2 November 2004. In Europe, the PlayStation 2 version was released on 16 November, the Xbox version 19 November, and the GameCube version 26 November.

Reminded of the technical flaws that plagued Enter the Dragonfly, critics from GameSpot and IGN were very hopeful of Spyro: A Hero's Tail for reasons of a reputable developer, improved graphics, wider draw distance, absence of loading times, and variety of playable characters and scenarios. IGN's Ivan Sulic enjoyed the game's self-referential humor. CUBE UK predicted the game would be like the others in the Spyro, but a little more fun due to less of an emphasis on collecting and more on platforming.

== Reception ==
Reception

Aggregate score
Aggregator	Score		
Aggregator	GameCube	PS2	Xbox
Metacritic	62/100	60/100	64/100

Review scores
Publication	Score		
Publication	GameCube	PS2	Xbox
4Players	N/A	78%	78%
Game Informer	6.5/10	6.5/10	6.5/10
GameSpot	5.8/10	5.8/10	5.8/10
GameZone	7.5/10	7/10	7/10
Hyper	77/100	77/100	77/100
IGN	7/10	7/10	7/10
NGC Magazine	51/100	N/A	N/A
Nintendo Power	3/5	N/A	N/A
Nintendo World Report	7/10	N/A	N/A
Official Nintendo Magazine	65%	N/A	N/A
Official U.S. PlayStation Magazine	N/A	2/5	N/A
Official Xbox Magazine (US)	N/A	N/A	6.7/10
TeamXbox	N/A	N/A	6.4/10
X-Play	2/5	2/5	N/A
GMR	N/A	5/10	N/A

Spyro: A Hero's Tail received generally mixed reviews from professional critics, who deemed it vastly superior to Enter the Dragonfly. A common criticism, even among those that found Spyro: A Hero's Tail decent, was having too little innovations to the platform and collecting genres, as well as the series' formula. The gameplay was criticized as lacking thrills, containing an over-emphasis on collecting with few additional aspects spicing it up, such as Spyro's new moves and the multiple-character mechanic.

Soboleski was in the minority about the variations, feeling there was a right mix of previously established and new elements for the Spyro series to remain fresh. Hyper journalist Joey Tekken found that Spyro: A Hero's Tail had the "effortless charm" similar franchises such as Crash Bandicoot had lost, calling its characters and dialogue "quite funny" and noting its variety of move sets, minigames and playable characters, and good flow in the level design. Sobeleski felt the game still had the prior games' "sharp wit and plenty of personality," and was just as fun to play. Juan Castro of IGN was positive towards the contribution of playable characters, attacks and challenges to the series, attributing the game's 15-hour replay value to them. He appreciated the game's incorporation of Spyro's new moves that were otherwise unoriginal, reasoning that it "feels less of a derivative game mechanic in this case."

The game's changing of environments when the dark gems are collected, were praised for being smooth and providing the player gratification for destroying the Dark Gems. Some critics enjoyed the addition of other playable characters and minigames, feeling they were "pretty cool" and added variety to the gameplay. On the other hand, Score criticized the minigames for "artificially" increasing play time and being "disruptive and boring." Matthew Hawkins of GMR also found most of the characters beside Sgt. Byrd too bland to be differentiable. D'Aprile and Score criticized the boss battles as easy, unoriginal and padding the gameplay.

Per previous entries, A Hero's Tail maintains a low challenge level, which critics thought would make it a great product for its young demographic, but maybe not for other gamers. "George", a writer for GameRankings, called it superior to Enter the Dragonfly for its increased responsiveness, frame rate, and focus on simple platforming over repetitive fighting. Other critics also praised the controls as responsive. Anise Hollingshead of GameZone wrote that the GameCube version was easy to play, but reported issues in difficulty balance. She felt that being able to progress was occasionally hindered by game design flaws, while having a small quantity of easy-to-avoid hazards and enemies.

The graphics and music were generally well received. Critics analogized the visuals as a polished original PlayStation title; although they argued it lacked detail and did not take full advantage of the PlayStation 2's capabilities, the child audience would still be enamored by its colourful and sharp textures, the diversity and detail in its environments, and adorable, cartoonish and well-animated characters. Castro positively analogized them as Tak 2: The Staff of Dreams and Scaler if they had less detail. Hollingshead compared its visual cartoon style and upbeat music to The Legend of Zelda: The Wind Waker. Particle, lighting and blur effects of the explosions and Spyro's breathing were also well received by Sobelski and Castro. However, Sobelski felt the polygon amount was too low for the fantasy world to be immersive, in spite of textures and lightings trying to hide these limitations.

== Legacy ==
According to a 2019 Game Informer piece by Andrew Reiner, A Hero's Tail was part of a "dark" era for the Spyro franchise following the critical and commercial success of the initial trilogy of titles produced by Insomniac Games; this period saw the series being handed to multiple development studios, "none capable of delivering the magic fans have come to expect". He wrote that while A Hero's Tail looks and plays like the original games, it lacks their "heart and soul" and its "flow isn't right".

Following completion, Eurocom considered developing another Spyro game, but the studio ultimately chose to prioritise a Pirates of the Caribbean adaptation instead.
