= Association for UK Interactive Entertainment =

Non-profit trade association

The Association for UK Interactive Entertainment
- Abbreviation: Ukie
- Formation: 1989; 37 years ago
- Type: Trade association
- Purpose: Supporting the UK video game industry
- Location: London, United Kingdom
- Region served: United Kingdom
- Key people: Nick Poole (CEO)
- Website: ukie.org.uk
- Formerly called: European Leisure Software Publishers Association (until September 2002); Entertainment and Leisure Software Publishers Association (until September 2010)

The Association for UK Interactive Entertainment (Ukie) is a non-profit trade association for the video game industry in the United Kingdom. Ukie was founded in 1989 as the European Leisure Software Publishers Association (ELSPA), then changed to Entertainment and Leisure Software Publishers Association (ELSPA) in 2002, and to its current name in 2010.

== History ==
The association was founded in 1989, though then named as the European Leisure Software Publishers Association (ELSPA). Around 2002, the organisation changed its name to Entertainment and Leisure Software Publishers Association, reflecting that their primary concerns were video game development on the United Kingdom islands and not mainland Europe.

In March 2010, members of the ELSPA voted to rename the association as Ukie, reflecting "the evolving and expanding nature of the industry, which the association exists to represent, and to encompass the new areas of activity that will be undertaken". The name was fully changed by September 2010.

In 2011, Ukie proposed a merger with The Independent Game Developers' Association (TIGA), a UK trade association for video game developers, to consolidate the two organisations under one trade body to represent the entire UK games industry. However TIGA's board rejected the proposal. TIGA's stance remained unchanged when a merger proposal was raised once again in 2013.

== Activities ==
Ukie's primary goal is to represent the UK's video game industry, and as of December 2017, represented over 395 video game companies worldwide. The association provides strategy and advice for developers and publishers, collects and publishes retail date for UK video game sales, and lobbies and meets with members of the government to help establish policy related to video games.

As ELSPA, Ukie provided voluntary age ratings for video games released in the UK from 1994 until its replacement by Pan European Game Information (PEGI) in 2003. One of its more notable activities was to help petition the UK government to use the PEGI rating system rather than the British Board of Film Classification (BBFC). Prior to 2012, video games were exempted from being required to be rated by the BBFC, unless they contained sexual content, nudity, or violence, though developers and publishers could voluntarily submit their works for review. Works that exceeded certain ratings could not be legally sold to minors. The ELSPA worked with the Video Standards Council (VSC), a government organization that was created to form a code of practice for how to inform consumers about content ratings in games and other video formats. ELSPA had recommended that as an industry standard, any game not needing classification by BBFC to be otherwise classified under the PEGI system, with the VSC helping to determine appropriating ratings.

In March 2008, Tanya Byron published a report commissioned by Prime Minister Gordon Brown, colloquially called the Byron Review, describing potentially harmful effects of video games on children, a debate over how to better label video games arose, and recommended that parents need to be given more information than the BBFC's rating alone. ELSPA along with other concerned groups believed that the BBFC lacked the clarity needed for video game ratings; current CEO Mike Rawlinson also said that the BBFC ratings were developed for linear content, while PEGI's were better reflective of interactive content such as video games. In 2008, ELSPA started a large push to getting PEGI as the approved system, while in the interim petitioning the BBFC to color-code its ratings labels to approach the same color-coding used by PEGI. The UK Parliament passed the Digital Economy Act 2010 into law, and required by July 2012 to transfer the rating of video games from the BBFC to the VSC (outside of games that contain strong pornographic content) and officially adopting the PEGI rating system, along with legal enforcement of selling mature titles to minors. The associate continued to work with the VSC to help establish how the PEGI rating should be displayed on packaging and other materials, and provide awareness to consumers and parents of the new change.

Ukie has campaigned and lobbied for the availability of tax relief for the UK games sector for many years. In 2012, they offered recommendations to the government consultations based on responses and opinions from over 200 video games companies in the country. A tax incentive scheme was scheduled to be included in the March 2010 United Kingdom budget by the outgoing Labour government, however it was not finalised and introduced until 2014 when the European Commission approved the decision. The tax relief scheme allows video games developers and companies to claim back up to 20% of their production costs if the project meets certain conditions, resulting in an estimated £188 million per year for the UK games industry. In 2017, the European Commission granted an extension to the scheme for another six years until 2023.

In December 2023, Ukie submitted oral evidence to the House of Commons about the benefits the Video Game Tax Relief had brought to the UK video game sector over the eight years it had been in place. In January of that year, Ukie CEO Dr Jo Twist OBE called on the UK games industry to submit their thoughts on VGTR as part of a community survey to be submitted as part of the government's consultation.

== See also ==
- The Entertainment Software Association, a similar organisation for the North American video game markets
