= Ratchet & Clank: Into the Nexus =

2013 video game

- North American box art
- Developer: Insomniac Games
- Publisher: Sony Computer Entertainment
- Directors: Brian Allgeier; Shaun McCabe; Chad Dezern
- Writer: TJ Fixman
- Composer: Michael Bross
- Series: Ratchet & Clank
- Platform: PlayStation 3
- Release: AU: November 6, 2013; NA: November 12, 2013; EU: November 22, 2013
- Genres: Third-person shooter, platform
- Mode: Single-player

Ratchet & Clank: Into the Nexus (known as Ratchet & Clank: Nexus in PAL regions) is a 2013 third-person shooter platform video game developed by Insomniac Games and published by Sony Computer Entertainment for the PlayStation 3. It is the eighth main installment in the Ratchet & Clank series and the fourth and final installment of its Future saga. The series is noted for the inclusion of exotic and unique locations and over-the-top gadgets, elements of the traditional Ratchet & Clank experience that return in this game.

Into the Nexus received generally positive reviews from critics, although lower than previous games in the Future series, with reviewers praising its graphics, gameplay, controls, and humor, but criticizing its story and short length. Having released by the end of the PlayStation 3's lifespan, the series went on hiatus, with a reimagining of the first game released for the PlayStation 4 in April 2016; a proper sequel, Ratchet & Clank: Rift Apart, was released for the PlayStation 5 in June 2021 and Windows in 2023.

== Gameplay ==
Ratchet & Clank: Into the Nexus marked a return to the original series' inclusion of exotic and unique locations.

Ratchet & Clank: Into the Nexus gameplay is similar to other games in the Ratchet & Clank series but more focused on gravity. The game features new weapons and gadgets as well as some returning ones, including the Fusion Grenade and The Warmonger. The game introduces weapons including the Winterizer, which creates a tornado that freezes enemies and turns them into snowmen; The OmniBlaster, a fast, short-range weapon, and; a Nightmare Box, a device that scares enemies, usually in forms of clowns, an eye or a pirate leaving Ratchet all sorts of weapons to eliminate them. Skill Points, Cheats and Gold Bolts make their return. Gadgets include The Repulsor, which suspends enemies in mid-air. Gravity is a vital entity, as it is used to travel to hard to reach places. Clank participates in 2D sections referred to The Netherverses which are mind bending puzzles, where Clank must navigate a treacherous maze while a Nether follows him. The main goal is for the Nether to reach the other side of the rift through the protagonist Ratchet's dimension.

Characters such as Zephyr, Cronk, Talwyn, Captain Qwark and The Plumber return, as well as the army of enemies called Thugs-4-Less. The Intergalactic Arena (named later as Destructapalooza) also returns. Raritanium is used to upgrade weapons. The game has three difficulty settings: Cadet, Hero and Legend. A Challenge Mode is available.

== Plot ==
Some time after the events of Full Frontal Assault, Ratchet and Clank (having joined the Polaris Defense Force), along with Cronk and Zephyr, are assigned to escort criminal Vendra Prog to a remote prison to serve her life sentence, aboard the ship Nebulox Seven. While Vendra is being prepped for the handoff, she uses her psychic powers to disable the ship's power, putting the crew's survival at risk. Although Ratchet manages to fix the damage, a small army of Thugs-4-Less mercenaries led by Vendra's twin brother Neftin attack the ship and rescue her. The mercenaries blow up the Nebulox with explosives, killing Cronk and Zephyr. Ratchet and Clank escape and manage to stow away on one of their ships headed towards planet Yerek in the Zarkov Sector.

Upon landing, Ratchet informs his superior Talwyn Apogee of the situation and is urged to return. Instead, he and Clank set out to investigate the Prog siblings' activities on Yerek. They meet Pollyx, a Terachnoid scientist who once worked for their old enemy Dr. Nefarious. Pollyx reveals that the Progs kidnapped him for his research on the "Netherverse", an alternate world inhabited by a race of demonic entities known as the Nethers.

While exploring the Meero Orphanage, where the Progs lived as children, the duo come across Vendra communicating with the leader of the Nethers, a creature she calls "Mr. Eye". After being discovered, they are saved by the timely intervention of Captain Qwark, who provides them with their old ship, Aphelion. With Qwark monitoring the Progs from space, Ratchet and Clank fly to planet Kragg to compete in Destructapalooza, a tournament organized by Neftin's mercenaries, winning a jetpack upgrade for Clank.

They then head to Weeblesnog City, the capital city of planet Silox, where the Progs are experimenting with a device resembling the Dimensionator. The duo confronts and defeat Neftin, but Vendra manages to open a portal to the Netherverse, allowing Mr. Eye and his soldiers to enter the real world. Revealing his manipulation of Vendra, Mr. Eye has her cast into the Netherverse. Ratchet and Clank escape and make contact with Neftin, who instructs them to travel to his hideout on planet Thram.

On the planet, the duo reunite with the Smuggler, who hires them to hunt the native wildlife in exchange for a pair of Hoverboots. Tracking down Neftin, they learn that the device used to free the Nethers was modeled after the original Dimensionator, which has been put on display in the Intergalactic Museum of History on planet Igliak. As it is now the only thing capable of breaching the Netherverse, Neftin asks Ratchet to retrieve it for him. The latter agrees on one condition: that the Progs turn themselves in afterwards.

With the help of a Tourbot stolen by Neftin, the duo make their way through the museum and locate the Dimensionator, just as the Nethers launch an invasion. While Neftin, Pollyx, and Qwark work to restore the machine to working order, Ratchet and Clank engage and defeat the invaders. As Mr. Eye moves to attack them, Ratchet maneuvers him into a one-on-one battle.

Using the Dimensionator, Neftin sends Clank into the Netherverse, where he rescues Vendra from captivity. Combining their powers, the Progs banish Mr. Eye and the Nethers back to their own dimension before surrendering to galactic authorities. With the Dimensionator broken, Ratchet confesses to Clank that he does not intend to leave Talwyn. Clank secretly takes the Dimensionator, intending to fix it in the hopes that Ratchet can locate the Lombax race.

In a post-credits scene, Cronk and Zephyr are shown as ghosts in front of a display dedicated to them in the Museum's main hall. After briefly trading insults, the two leave.

== Development ==
During early development a prototype level was created to ensure Ratchet & Clank: Into the Nexus felt as it should for a traditional Ratchet & Clank game. One of the game's key themes is gravity with various puzzles and gadgets based around the use of gravity. While developing the game inspiration for many of the gameplay features were taken from previous games in the series. The developers played through many of the previous games and took inspiration to bring back many favorite features and also to tweak the game engine. The 2D sections using Clank were inspired by a concept of turning Clank into a shadow. Insomniac Games' creative director Brian Allgeier used a projector to demonstrate Clank changing gravity. This eventually developed into the 2D Netherverses with gravity changing mechanics.

The plot maintains the Ratchet & Clank series' expected humor but also has a scarier direction while exploring the darkness of space. It continues Ratchet's personal story-arc and acts as an epilogue to the Ratchet & Clank Future saga. Into the Nexus was written by TJ Fixman. The villain's connection in finding their species is a key part of the plot in Into the Nexus and it follows previous Ratchet & Clank games in connecting Ratchet with the villains. The plot is also about Ratchet coming to terms with his decisions in A Crack in Time.

The title shares some similarities with a cancelled project from 2006 titled Ratchet & Clank: Nexus but no other similarities with the project are present. A working title for Ratchet & Clank: Into the Nexus was Ratchet & Clank: Into the Nether Regions referencing both the exploration of the darkness of space and acting as an innuendo common to the Ratchet & Clank series.

== Release ==
Ratchet & Clank: Into the Nexus was released on November 12, 2013 in North America and November 20, 2013 for most PAL regions, on the PlayStation 3 in both disc-based formats and also digitally through the PlayStation Store. It was released on November 6, 2013 in Australia, November 12, 2013 in North America, November 22, 2013 in Europe, and December 12, 2013 in Japan. There is also a download code for Quest for Booty included.

== Ratchet & Clank: Before the Nexus ==
A mobile application, Ratchet & Clank: Before the Nexus, allows players to earn Raritanium for upgrading weapons in Into the Nexus. The game is in the style of an endless runner where the player must collect bolts and defeat enemies and serves as a promotion for and a prequel to Into the Nexus. It was released on December 18, 2013, for iOS and Android devices.

== Music ==
Ratchet & Clank: Before the Nexus features a soundtrack composed by Michael Bross, who also composed the soundtracks for Ratchet & Clank (2016), Ratchet & Clank: All 4 One, Ratchet & Clank: Full Frontal Assault, Oddworld: Munch's Oddysee, Oddworld: Stranger's Wrath. The soundtrack for the game is over 3 hours long with inspirations of classical composition in almost all the tracks. In total, the soundtrack features 114 tracks.

== Reception ==
Reception

Aggregate score
Aggregator	Score
Metacritic	76/100

Review scores
Publication	Score
Game Informer	8/10
GameSpot	8/10
GamesRadar+	3.5/5
GameZone	7/10
IGN	8.2/10
Polygon	8.5/10

Ratchet & Clank: Into the Nexus received "generally favorable reviews" from critics, according to review aggregator website Metacritic.

Andrew Reiner of Game Informer scored the game an 8/10. He praised the visuals, particularly during action sequences where the screen is covered with explosions, particles, and flying nuts and bolts. He did say the series "shows its age" with its dated texture work and character models, but enjoyed the soundtrack, calling it "playful" and "energetic". Reiner also enjoyed the "excellent" weapons and gadgets for offering gameplay variety, as well as the replayability, controls, and the VVVVVV inspired Clank mini-game. Lastly, Reiner felt at odds with the game's length; he felt that even though the game "packs a punch", it ended sooner than expected, writing: "Into the Nexus' gameplay holds true to what we've known and enjoyed for over a decade. Should we be demanding bigger and better things? Maybe, but there's something about this formula that just works. I walked away from it hungry for more."

IGN's Cam Shea awarded the game an 8.2 out if 10, liking the weapons, upgrades, and gadgets, as well as the Challenge Mode, and the "great" sense of humour. He had minor criticisms of the game, such as the "weak" final level, but said "Nexus is a fine return to Ratchet & Clank's inimitable brand of action-platforming." Shea summed up the review by writing: "Nexus may not be long, but it's steeped in Ratchet & Clank special sauce. The characters are offbeat and funny, the story is well-paced, the art direction is distinctive and above all else it's a blast to play, with always evolving gameplay and an ever-escalating arsenal. A great swansong for the series on PS3."

GameZone's Josh Engen gave the game a 7.5 out of 10, stating "Ratchet & Clank titles are a distraction from games like Call of Duty or something to play when a toddler is in the room. I know that this might not sound a shining endorsement, but nitpicking the game's shortcomings or comparing the character development to titles like The Last of Us or BioShock Infinite is a little silly. Into the Nexus is good. Not great. Not bad. Just good. And anyone who tries to take a heavy-handed position is being ridiculous."

Giancarlo Saldana from GamesRadar gave the game 3.5 out of 5, saying: "Nexus only lasts about five hours. Yeah, it's pretty short, but those are some good five hours that'll remind you of why you fell in love with Ratchet and Clank in the first place. Its $30 / £20 price tag makes it a great incentive to pick it up, and it delivers what you'd expect from the series. Nexus may not be the most conclusive of the Ratchet and Clank titles, but it is a (mostly) charming sendoff to years of PS3 gaming." Saldana mostly commended the "fun" gameplay and humour, but disliked the abrupt ending and the Clank side-scrolling sections.

In his review for Polygon, Philip Kollar scored the game an 8.5/10 and wrote: "The PlayStation 3 has been a rocky road for Ratchet and Clank, but Into the Nexus is a fitting end. It returns to its strong roots without depending on nostalgia alone to drive it, embracing the adventurous spirit that birthed the series over a decade ago. Into the Nexus is a wonderfully strong note for Ratchet and Clank to go out on for this generation, and hopefully a good indication of the more exciting adventures awaiting them in the next."

GameSpot's Cameron Woolsey scored the game an 8/10, praising the "fantastic" and "fluid" controls, the "wonderful" sense of humor which "keeps you grinning from ear to ear", and the overall gameplay. Woolsey did opine that some weapons were "uninspired", but said the "tight" action keeps the game "roaring forward" anyway. Woolsey stated: "Into the Nexus doesn't entirely break from the series' classic roots, but its focus on action over platforming makes it a fast-paced thrill ride, and the short length makes running through it again with Omega weapons in Challenge Mode irresistible. In what may be the last Ratchet & Clank for this console generation, the series takes its leave with a proper bang, reuniting you with your favorite characters and keeping you hooting and hollering all the way to the finish line."
