= Daniel Hagen =

American actor

Daniel Hagen is an American voice, television, and film actor. He has had guest appearances on Seinfeld ("The Dealership"), CSI, Buffy the Vampire Slayer, Friends, Sabrina, the Teenage Witch, and Charmed. He has voice acted for Star Wars video games such as Star Wars: Bounty Hunter, Star Wars: X-Wing Alliance, Star Wars: Knights of the Old Republic. In other voice acting roles, he has voiced in the video games Area-51, Metal Gear Solid: Peace Walker, Ratchet & Clank Future: Tools of Destruction, Ratchet & Clank Future: A Crack in Time, Ratchet & Clank: Into the Nexus, Dishonored, and the Skylanders series.

== Selected filmography ==
=== Film ===
| Year | Title | Role | Notes |
|---|---|---|---|
| 1990 | The Bonfire of the Vanities | Media Jackal | |
| 1991 | The Super | Construction Worker | |
| 1993 | Wilder Napalm | Harrison | |
| 1993 | For Love or Money | Bartender Vincent | |
| 2004 | Open House | Marvin Tibett | |
| 2015 | Justice League: Gods and Monsters | Doctor Sivana (voice) | Direct-to-video |
| 2018 | White Fang | Marshal Todd (voice) | |
| 2022 | Ernest & Celestine: A Trip to Gibberitia | Police Chief (voice) | |

=== Television ===
| Year | Title | Role | Notes |
|---|---|---|---|
| 1998 | Seinfeld | Rick | Episode: "The Dealership" |
| 2002 | Buffy the Vampire Slayer | Frank | Episode: "Gone" |
| 2015 | Justice League: Gods and Monsters Chronicles | Doctor Sivana (voice) | Web series; episode: "Bomb" |
| 2017 | Feud | Michael Luciano | Episode: "Pilot" |
| 2017 | Spider-Man | Cop #1 (voice) | Episode: "Horizon High" |
| 2018 | Summer Camp Island | Additional Voices | 2 episodes |
| 2024 | Sausage Party: Foodtopia | Various Voices | 6 episodes |

=== Video games ===
| Year | Title | Role | Notes |
|---|---|---|---|
| 1999 | Star Wars: X-Wing Alliance | Emkay | |
| 2002 | Resident Evil | Enrico Marini | |
| 2004 | The Punisher | Crack Dealer, Chop Shop Worker, Fisk Industries Guard | |
| 2004 | Lemony Snicket's A Series of Unfortunate Events | Arthur Poe | |
| 2005 | Area 51 | Additional Voices | |
| 2007 | Ratchet & Clank Future: Tools of Destruction | Cronk | |
| 2009 | Ratchet & Clank Future: A Crack in Time | Cronk | |
| 2010 | Metal Gear Solid: Peace Walker | Soldiers | |
| 2011 | Skylanders: Spyro's Adventure | Master Eon | |
| 2011 | Ratchet & Clank: All 4 One | Cronk | |
| 2012 | Dishonored | High Overseer Campbell | |
| 2013 | The Cave | Livingston, Hermit, Security Guard | |
| 2013 | SpongeBob Moves In! | Mermaid Man | |
| 2013 | Ratchet & Clank: Into the Nexus | Cronk | |
| 2018 | Red Dead Redemption 2 | The Local Pedestrian Population | |
| 2019 | Death Stranding | The Doctor | |
| 2020 | Mafia: Definitive Edition | Additional Voices | |
| 2020 | Maneater | Hunter 07 | |
| 2022 | Horizon Forbidden West | Additional Voices | |
| 2024 | Final Fantasy VII Rebirth | Additional Voices | |
