= Secret Agent Clank =

2008 video game

- North American PlayStation Portable cover art
- Developer: High Impact Games (Note: PlayStation 2 version developed by Sanzaru Games.)
- Publisher: Sony Computer Entertainment
- Designer: David Goodrich
- Composer: David Bergeaud
- Series: Ratchet & Clank
- Platforms: PlayStation Portable; PlayStation 2
- Release: PlayStation Portable: NA: June 17, 2008; EU: July 11, 2008; AU: July 17, 2008; JP: November 20, 2008; PlayStation 2: NA: May 26, 2009; EU: June 19, 2009; AU: June 2009
- Genre: Platform
- Modes: Single-player, multiplayer

Secret Agent Clank is a 2008 platform video game developed by High Impact Games and published by Sony Computer Entertainment for the PlayStation Portable. It is the second spin-off of the Ratchet & Clank series. A port developed by Sanzaru Games for the PlayStation 2 was released the following year, making it the last installment of the series to be released on the console.

The theme of Secret Agent Clank is a spoof of the James Bond series, and is based on the Secret Agent Clank element of Up Your Arsenal (2004). To fit with the James Bond theme, Clank has an array of helpful gadgets and devices on his tuxedo, such as a bow tie that he can use as a boomerang and a rose that turns into a carnivorous plant to devour enemies.

The game received mixed reviews from critics. The PSP version was re-released in September 2024 on the PlayStation 4 and PlayStation 5.

== Gameplay ==
Unlike previous Ratchet & Clank games, Clank's gameplay is more like Ratchet's in comparison. In previous titles, Clank's gameplay consisted mostly of brief, puzzle-platform-oriented segments with minor melee combat elements; in Secret Agent Clank, he has weapons and gadgets of his own. Featured are quick time events where the player must press a sequence of buttons correctly to sneak through an area undetected. Giant Clank, wherein Clank transforms into a monster-sized fighting machine, also makes an appearance.

Besides Clank, both Ratchet and Captain Qwark are playable in the game, as are the Gadgebots. Qwark's gameplay segments are based on dubious accounts of his own exploits and are more action-based. Ratchet's segments in prison are more like the arena gameplay featured in previous games in the series. The Gadgebot segments require switching between Gadgebots to solve puzzles.

Clank has six weapons in his inventory: the Tie-a-Rang, Cuff Link Bombs, Tanglevine Carnation, Blowtorch Briefcase, Thunderstorm Umbrella, and Holo-Knuckles. Throughout the game, Clank will find weapons that Ratchet can use. Clank secretly puts the weapons in cakes, then sends them to prison for Ratchet to pick up. Clank has the opportunity to gain access to a snowboard and other vehicles. The player can upgrade Clank's "Clank-Fu" fighting moves and weapons, similar to the weapons-leveling system in traditional Ratchet & Clank games. The player can learn new techniques, as well as various finishing moves.

== Plot ==
A precious gem known as the Eye of Infinity, held at the Boltaire Museum, has been stolen, with Ratchet falsely accused and jailed as he is at the scene of the crime. Skeptical about his involvement, Clank infiltrates the Museum to find out more about the Eye of Infinity. But much to his dismay, Clank finds only coordinates to Asyanica Rooftops. Meanwhile, in jail, Ratchet is forced to fend off the majority of the inmates whom he is responsible for their imprisonment to stay alive.

Clank travels to the Asyanica Rooftops, but is held captive. He contacts the agency Gadgebots to free him.

Once freed, he sets to find information about Number Woo, the owner of Asyanica. Although he admits he took the Eye of Infinity, he actually gave the gem to a fellow villain, Countess Ivana Lottabolts.

While this is happening, Captain Qwark is writing an autobiography about adventures that never happened, such as him fighting a Mechanical Monster to save a city. Meanwhile, Clank heads to Lottabolts' snowy domain, Glaciara, and asks her for the Eye, but in the process is challenged to a dance of death. After avoiding all the traps during the dance, Ivana says the Eye has been taken to Rionosis and it is in the possession of a Kingpin. Armed with the information, Clank escapes on his snowboard.

En route to Rionosis, Clank gets a distress call that Ratchet is in trouble. Ratchet is forced to fend off more inmates in the Prison Cafeteria. Clank lands in Rionosis and begins to tail the Kingpin; however, he escapes. Clank is forced to jump on numerous gondolas to reach safety. Clank finds out that the Eye is taken to the Casino. Concurrently, Qwark arrives in Rionosis to continue his autobiography where he defeats the Jack of All Trades. Meanwhile, Clank reaches the Casino's Main Room but is denied entry due to not having a password. Back in jail, Ratchet reencourters Slim Cognito (a shady weapon tradesman met in Going Commando). Slim trades the password with Ratchet on condition that he defeats his associates. Once he is successful, Clank gets the password and is challenged to a game of poker in exchange for the box goods he saw earlier in the Casino. But once again the gem has been taken to another destination, this time in the Venantonio Labs. At the end of Venantonio Labs is a scientist who was ridiculed for his inventions. With the help of the scientist, Clank escapes on a speedboat to Fort Sprocket, the real location of the Eye of Infinity. Concurrently Qwark arrives in Venantonio and "reminisces" his days of performing in the mermaid play.

In the prison showers, Ratchet meets the Plumber who was called to fix a broken pipe. He accidentally throws the pipe to another fellow guard. Enraged, the guard, together with the fellow inmates engage in battle yet again. Meanwhile, Clank reaches Fort Sprocket. He makes his way to the main vault but is trapped. He contacts the agency Gadgebots to release him. Once inside he finds the Kingpin went to the Spaceship Graveyard. Clank ventures into the Graveyard and the kingpin finally reveals himself – it is Klunk (his doppelganger created by Dr. Nefarious from Up Your Arsenal). Klunk proceeds to destroy Clank he manages to escape on a Giant Clank Pad. Qwark arrives in the Graveyard and talks about his adventure in saving the orphanage nuns. Meanwhile, there is chaos in the Jail and Ratchet is forced to defend the other inmates from the enemies. Clank manages to locate Klunk's base of operations on Hydrano. It turns out it is an underwater base. After exploring, Clank finally is face to face with Klunk. Klunk reveals he wanted success by destroying every planet in the universe but saving it in time by Clank (who resembles Klunk) the plot thickens when Klunk will make it seem as if the fake Klunk (Clank) destroys the planets only for Clank (portrayed by the real Klunk) to thwart his plans. They engage in battle. Midway through the battle. Klunk says the Eye of Infinity is poised in the center of the universe, either way if Clank or Klunk dies, Klunk will still succeed in his plans. Qwark manages to move the Eye from destruction and saves the galaxy.

The game ends with Ratchet and Clank back in their Megapolis apartment using a vacuum cleaner which resembles Klunk. The camera focuses on the vacuum cleaner's filter. The eyes reactivate, implying he is still alive.

== Development and release ==
Secret Agent Clank was in development before the release of Size Matters. In July 2007, rumors of the game's existence surfaced when David Bergeaud, who composes music for the Ratchet & Clank series, accidentally revealed the game in his online resume. The actual game was not confirmed by Sony until a pre-TGS 2007 conference.

On September 17, 2024, the PSP version was re-released for PlayStation 4 and 5. It is an emulated version that allows for enhanced graphics, save states, rewinding, custom controls and trophies.

== Reception ==
Reception

Aggregate score
Aggregator	Score	
Aggregator	PS2	PSP
Metacritic	61/100	72/100

Review scores
Publication	Score	
Publication	PS2	PSP
1Up.com	N/A	C+
Destructoid	N/A	6/10
Eurogamer	N/A	6/10
Game Informer	N/A	8.5/10
GamePro	N/A	4.31/5 (Note: GamePro gave the PSP version 4.25/5 for graphics, two 4.5/5 scores for sound and fun factor, and 4/5 for control.)
GameRevolution	N/A	B+
GameSpot	N/A	8/10
GameSpy	N/A	3/5
GamesRadar+	N/A	3.5/5
GameZone	6.8/10	6.9/10
IGN	6/10	6.5/10
PlayStation Official Magazine – Australia	N/A	7/10
PlayStation Official Magazine – UK	N/A	8/10
PALGN	N/A	6½/10
Pocket Gamer	N/A	3/5
VideoGamer.com	N/A	6/10

Secret Agent Clank received "mixed or average" reviews from critics, according to review aggregator website Metacritic.
