= Ratchet & Clank =

Series of platform video games

- Logo since 2021
- Genres: Action-adventure, platform, third-person shooter
- Developers: Insomniac Games; Handheld Games (2005); High Impact Games (2007–2008); Sanzaru Games (2009); Idol Minds (2012–2013); Tin Giant (2012); Mass Media Games (2014); Nixxes Software (2023)
- Publisher: Sony Interactive Entertainment
- Creator: Insomniac Games
- Platforms: PlayStation 2; Java ME; PlayStation Portable; PlayStation 3; PlayStation Vita; iOS; Android; PlayStation 4; PlayStation 5; Windows
- First release: Ratchet & Clank; November 6, 2002
- Latest release: Ratchet & Clank: Rift Apart; June 11, 2021

Ratchet & Clank is a series of action-adventure platform and third-person shooter video games created and developed by Insomniac Games and published by Sony Interactive Entertainment as a flagship title for Sony's PlayStation 2. High Impact Games developed two installments for the PlayStation Portable while other studios were involved in remasters and ports. An animated feature film adaptation was released in 2016 alongside a reimagining of the original game for the PlayStation 4; five years would pass until the next and most recent entry, Rift Apart, which was released for the PlayStation 5 and later ported to Windows.

The games take place in a science fiction setting and follow the adventures of Ratchet and Clank – a mechanic of the feline humanoid Lombax race, and a diminutive, sentient Zoni "defective" robot – as they travel through the universe, saving it from evil forces that consistently threaten it. The series is noted for its inclusion of many exotic, unique and over-the-top weapons and gadgets, a concept that Insomniac Games has expanded into their other games.

== History ==
Following the development of Spyro: Year of the Dragon, the third installment of the Spyro series, Insomniac Games wanted to move into a new intellectual property, since the Spyro series was owned by Universal Interactive Studios. With the PS2 recently announced in 2000, Insomniac began to prototype ideas for games on this new console. One, called Monster Knight, never got past the prototyping stage, while a second, called Girl with a Stick and aimed to be a mashup of The Legend of Zelda and Tomb Raider series, had about six months of development work before Insomniac's CEO, Ted Price, decided to cancel it as "the team wasn't feeling it", according to director Brian Allgeier. Now in 2001 and struggling with ideas, Chief Creative Officer Brian Hastings proposed the idea of "an alien that travels from planet to planet, collecting weapons and gadgets", an idea inspired by Spaceman Spiff from Calvin and Hobbes and by Marvin the Martian. This idea inspired the team since it would allow them to create new worlds and characters to develop. Artists sketched a number of concepts for this alien character, which was originally reptilian, but ended up as a new species they called a "Lombax", a name Price had come up with. Along with this character they named Ratchet, they gave him a robotic companion, Clank. Originally developed as a childlike version of the Star Wars character C-3PO, they later decided that Ratchet and Clank should work instead like a buddy cop film, and made Clank an equal to Ratchet.

The first game Ratchet & Clank, released in 2002, was successful. In planning the second, they revamped Ratchet's character, as they felt the first game portrayed him as a jerk, according to writer TJ Fixman. They softened the character to make him more relatable, at that point hiring James Arnold Taylor to voice the character (Ratchet's behavior toward Clank in Tools of Destruction when speaking about the existence of the Zoni and the risks posed by the Dimensionator could be a hint or reference to the character in the first game). They spent more time on developing interesting weapons to make the combat as enjoyable as the platforming sections of the game. Both the sequel Going Commando and the following game Up Your Arsenal were well-received and considered commercial successes. Allgeier considered that these games had success because they were continually evolving the series to match the current climate in video games, where mascot-driven games had fallen out of favor, and the company had adopted an "adapt or die" mentality for each title. The "adapt or die" approach was used for the fourth title, Ratchet: Deadlocked (2005), as they made the title darker and more combat-oriented given the popularity of the Halo and Grand Theft Auto series. While the game was well received, this approach was not met well by players, as it veered too much from the buddy cop concept, lacked the exploration of previous games and comedy in the writing. The balance between keeping to the "DNA" of a Ratchet & Clank game against the "adapt or die" mantra would continue to be a struggle throughout Insomniac's development of the series.

Insomniac was asked to help create one of the launch titles for the PS3, Resistance: Fall of Man (2006). The company used this title to acclimate itself to the new hardware, and did not push the capabilities of the game engine. With this title under wraps, Insomniac was then able to consider how to approach the fifth Ratchet & Clank game, knowing how to work the PS3 hardware with the aim to make a game that played like an animated movie. Insomniac brought on Fixman to write for the series at this point; one of Fixman's first goals was to take disjointed mythology from the first four games and flesh out the characters more to give them a stronger backstory. This led to the three Future games, the first being Tools of Destruction (2007), which brought the series back to what players had latched onto and met with praise, outside of its cliffhanger ending. However, between this and having to drop a planned co-operative element from Tools of Destruction, Insomniac wanted to produce a new title quickly for Sony to avoid some of these concerns, and came up with the more experimental Quest for Booty (2008), a shorter title that played with gameplay elements not previously used in the series, like conversation trees. Quest for Booty helped Insomniac to determine where they wanted to take the series next, and planned for the next game, A Crack in Time (2009) to be the last game in the series, designed to include all the elements they knew players wanted in a Ratchet & Clank game.

A Crack in Time was successful, and Sony had put pressure on Insomniac to continue the series, though by this time, the developers had fatigue with the series. Knowing that Sony was wary about the impact of mobile gaming which were drawing players away from family-oriented titles, Insomniac experimented with various concepts for the next few games. All 4 One (2011) was a fully co-operative shooter, which dropped some of the platforming elements from the series. Full Frontal Assault (2012) added tower defense elements to the basic gameplay. Finally, Insomniac developed Into the Nexus (2013) as a return to the core elements of the series, but was considered to be a shorter title. Sony and Insomniac agreed at this point to put the series on hold.

Sony started to plan for the 2016 film adaption of the first game; by nature, the screenplay of the film deviated in several areas from the story of the first game. As Sony wanted a companion game, Insomniac worked to create a remake of the first game, informed by the changes made for the film's screenplay.

Alongside Insomniac's development, the series has included two spin-off games developed by High Impact Games designed for the PSP, Size Matters (2007) and Secret Agent Clank (2008).

The next game, Ratchet & Clank: Rift Apart (2021), was revealed at the 2020 PS5 Future of Gaming event on June 11, 2020. Initially a title exclusive to PlayStation 5, it was later released on Windows on July 26, 2023.

== Games ==
Release timeline
2002	Ratchet & Clank
2003	Ratchet & Clank: Going Commando
2004	Ratchet & Clank: Up Your Arsenal
2005	Ratchet: Deadlocked
2005	Ratchet & Clank: Going Mobile
2006	Ratchet & Clank: Clone Home (Note: Originally set for a September 2006 release, it was canceled but later recovered and made available in October 2025.)
2007	Ratchet & Clank: Size Matters
2007	Ratchet & Clank Future: Tools of Destruction
2008	Secret Agent Clank
2008	Ratchet & Clank Future: Quest for Booty
2009	Ratchet & Clank Future: A Crack in Time
2010
2011	Ratchet & Clank: All 4 One
2012	Ratchet & Clank Collection
2012	Ratchet & Clank: Full Frontal Assault
2013	Ratchet & Clank: Into the Nexus
2013	Ratchet & Clank: Before the Nexus
2014
2015
2016	Ratchet & Clank
2017
2018
2019
2020
2021	Ratchet & Clank: Rift Apart
2022
2023
2024
2025
TBA	Ratchet & Clank: Ranger Rumble

Title	Year	Platform
Mainline titles
Ratchet & Clank (2002)	2002	PlayStation 2, PlayStation 3, PlayStation Vita
Ratchet & Clank: Going Commando	2003	PlayStation 2, PlayStation 3, PlayStation Vita
Ratchet & Clank: Up Your Arsenal	2004	PlayStation 2, PlayStation 3, PlayStation Vita
Ratchet: Deadlocked	2005	PlayStation 2, PlayStation 3
Ratchet & Clank Future: Tools of Destruction	2007	PlayStation 3
Ratchet & Clank Future: Quest for Booty	2008	PlayStation 3
Ratchet & Clank Future: A Crack in Time	2009	PlayStation 3
Ratchet & Clank: Into the Nexus	2013	PlayStation 3
Ratchet & Clank: Rift Apart	2021	PlayStation 5, Windows
Other titles
Ratchet & Clank: Size Matters	2007	PlayStation Portable, PlayStation 2
Secret Agent Clank	2008	PlayStation Portable, PlayStation 2
Ratchet & Clank: All 4 One	2011	PlayStation 3
Ratchet & Clank: Full Frontal Assault	2012	PlayStation 3, PlayStation Vita
Remake
Ratchet & Clank (2016)	2016	PlayStation 4
Mobile titles
Ratchet & Clank: Going Mobile	2005	J2ME
Ratchet & Clank: Clone Home	2006	J2ME
Ratchet & Clank: Before the Nexus	2013	iOS, Android
Ratchet & Clank: Ranger Rumble	TBA	iOS, Android
Compilation
Ratchet & Clank Collection	2012	PlayStation 3, PlayStation Vita

=== Mainline games ===
==== Original series ====
===== Ratchet & Clank =====
Ratchet & Clank was released on November 6, 2002, in North America for the PlayStation 2. In the game, Chairman Drek (Note: His original position is "Chairman Drek"; he later self-promotes to "Executive Chairman Drek", "Supreme Executive Chairman Drek", and finally to "Ultimate Supreme Executive Chairman Drek".) plans to take pieces from other planets across the Solana Galaxy and create one new planet for his people, the Blarg, whose planet has become polluted and overpopulated, thus making it uninhabitable. Aside from the two protagonists, the game introduces Captain Qwark, who appears in the following games, as both an enemy and ally.

The game introduced features such as the ability to purchase items, weapons and unlocking gadgets as the game progresses, which have become a staple of the series in following games. The first in this series does not feature the upgrade system of experience earned for enemies killed; instead, the player may purchase stronger, gold versions of select weapons using a combination of hidden Gold Bolt items and regular bolts after finding a secret area in the game.

===== Going Commando =====
Going Commando (also known as Locked and Loaded in Europe and Australia and Ratchet & Clank 2 in Japan) was released on November 11, 2003, in North America for the PS2.

Mr. Abercrombie Fizzwidget, CEO of the Megacorp company in another galaxy called Bogon, hires Ratchet after the events of the first game, providing him with commando training in order to retrieve the "Experiment", an artificial creature stolen by an unknown masked thief while Clank is given a job as an accountant for Megacorp.

The game takes place in a different setting than the first installment, this time in the Bogon Galaxy. In Going Commando, Ratchet is able to compete in hoverbike races and engages in spaceship battles. This game introduces the leveling system for weapons that appears in every succeeding game; using a given weapon frequently, and thus gaining enough experience, causes it to upgrade into a more powerful version with upgraded stats and new abilities. Other changes to game mechanics include Ratchet's experience-based health upgrade system, as well as the ability to strafe for greater shooting accuracy during combat.

===== Up Your Arsenal =====
Up Your Arsenal (also known as Ratchet & Clank 3 in Europe and Japan and Ratchet & Clank 3: Up Your Arsenal in Australia) was released on November 3, 2004, in North America for the PlayStation 2. The plot consists of an invasion of the Solana galaxy by a humanoid race known as the "Tyhrranoids", led by the game's main antagonist, Dr. Nefarious, a robotic madman determined to destroy all biological life in the galaxy. The game sees the return of protagonists Ratchet and Clank alongside new allies including Sasha Phyronix, captain of the Starship Phoenix, a locale which serves as a hub area for the player. Captain Qwark makes a reappearance and is a playable character in "Vid Comics" found throughout the single-player campaign.

The third installment of the series retains the experience and upgrade mechanics of the previous game, with weapons becoming increasingly devastating with increased use. Combat and platforming mechanics are also relatively unchanged as is the weapon purchase system, with bolts remaining as the primary currency throughout. The game retains the series' signature weapons dealer, "Gadgetron". The game introduces a multiplayer mode, featuring 4-player split-screen play with online play supporting up to 8 players, with staple match types such as Deathmatch or Capture The Flag.

Space battles and race mini-games of the previous games are not present in Up Your Arsenal, same for the grindboots and grindrails.

===== Ratchet: Deadlocked =====
Ratchet: Deadlocked (also known as Ratchet: Gladiator in Europe, Australia and Africa and Ratchet & Clank 4 in Japan) was released on October 25, 2005, in North America for the PlayStation 2. Deadlocked deviates from the previous installments of the series by reducing the platforming and puzzle elements, and focusing on the combat aspects with a predominantly arena-combat-oriented setting. In Deadlocked, Ratchet, Clank and Al are captured by the media mogul Gleeman Vox and transported to a lawless region of the Solana galaxy known as the Shadow Sector. Ratchet is forced to compete in an intense, underground bloodsport called DreadZone to ensure his, Clank's and Al's survival.

For the first time in the series, Clank does not accompany Ratchet during the entirety of the single-player campaign, nor is he given playable sequences. While multiplayer is retained, an additional option to engage the game's single-player campaign as two-player co-op has been introduced, although it bears no effect on the outcome of the plot.

Though Deadlocked was not included in the retail high-definition collection of the original trilogy for PlayStation 3, a high-definition version of the game was released as a downloadable title on the PlayStation Network on May 21, 2013, in North America, and on September 5, 2013, in Europe.

==== Future saga ====
===== Tools of Destruction =====
Tools of Destruction (known as Ratchet & Clank: Tools of Destruction in Europe and Australia and Ratchet & Clank Future in Japan) was developed by Insomniac Games, and was released on October 23, 2007, for the PlayStation 3. This was the first Ratchet and Clank game for the PlayStation 3, and the first in the Future saga. In this installment, the self-proclaimed crown prince of the Cragmites known as Emperor Tachyon is after Ratchet, claiming that he is the last Lombax in the universe. He and Clank escape to the Polaris Galaxy, befriending the Markazian Talwyn Apogee and two old war bots named Cronk and Zephyr, who help the two uncover the Lombax secret, Tachyon's ultimate goal. Throughout the game, Clank encounters a mysterious race called the Zoni, who assist him at various points in the game, only to abduct him during the ending cutscene.

Tools of Destruction's weapon upgrade system introduces the need for Raritanium, an aptly-named rare resource mentioned in previous games, in exchange for certain upgrades, as well as continuous use of said weapons to upgrade them automatically.

===== Quest for Booty =====
Quest for Booty is a short game developed by Insomniac Games and was digitally released on August 21, 2008, on the PlayStation Network Store. It was later released as physically in Europe and Asia, but not North America. It is also known as Ratchet & Clank: Quest for Booty in most PAL regions and as Ratchet & Clank Future Gaiden: Kaizoku Dark Water no Hihou in Japan.

Taking place where Tools of Destruction left off, the game focuses on Ratchet and Talwyn's search for Clank. After a number of encounters with the pirates introduced in Tools of Destruction, they finally manage to activate a device called the Obsidian Eye that allows communication with the Zoni. However, the machine cannot be activated without a reusable black hole frozen in furion crystal, named the Fulcrum Star. Rusty Pete revives the dead pirates and gives Captain Slag a new body. After Ratchet defeats Slag/Darkwater, he and Talwyn obtain the Fulcrum Star. Ratchet then activates the Obsidian Eye, and learns Clank's fate: the Zoni have him at the Great Clock, where he is malfunctioning. The Zoni reveal that they have hired Dr. Nefarious to repair Clank. Ratchet sets off to rescue Clank, and the story ends with Rusty Pete narrating to the head of Slag, which survived the destruction of Darkwater.

===== A Crack in Time =====
This game is also known as A Crack in Time in Europe and Ratchet & Clank Future 2 in Japan.

At the end of the credits for Quest for Booty, a message reading: "The Quest Continues Fall 2009" is shown. This indicated the planned release date for the next installment of the series. Ratchet continues his search for Clank, Dr. Nefarious returns as the antagonist, and the game goes into more depth about what happened to the Lombaxes.

The story and player's perspective alternate between Ratchet and Clank; Clank's side of the story involves him fixing time at the Great Clock, solving time puzzles, as well as learning to fulfill his destined role as the Great Clock's senior caretaker. Clank also learns that a Zoni named Orvus had created his soul. Ratchet's part in the story includes meeting another Lombax named General Alister Azimuth, an elder who turns out to be unintentionally responsible for their kind's downfall as he allowed Tachyon to use the Lombaxes' technology, and is intent on taking control of the Great Clock to rectify his mistakes. Qwark assists Ratchet during the storyline and eventually goes alone to gather useful information for Ratchet.

===== Into the Nexus =====
Into the Nexus (Nexus in Europe) was released for PS3 on November 12, 2013. In this game, Ratchet and Clank, on board the Nebulox Seven Prison Ship, are tasked by Talwyn Apogee to deliver notorious criminal Vendra Prog to the Vartax Detention Centre with Cronk and Zephyr's help. Vendra's twin brother Neftin Prog, along with hired thugs from Thugs-4-Less, stages a jailbreak and frees her. Vendra activates the Nebulox's self-destruct sequence, escaping with Neftin while Ratchet and Clank are flung into space, unable to save Cronk and Zephyr. Ratchet and Clank pursue the twins throughout the galaxy, seeking revenge for their fallen comrades.

This installment introduced gravity-based platforming and gameplay, as well as 2D puzzle sequences involving Clank in the Netherverse, a focal point of the game's plot.

==== Current series ====
===== Rift Apart =====
Rift Apart is a PS5 entry. Building on elements introduced in the 2016 remake of Ratchet & Clank, the game follows the titular characters after the events of Into the Nexus as they traverse across different worlds in multiple realities to stop their archenemy, Doctor Nefarious, from exploiting a catastrophic dimensional collapse caused by a malfunctioning Dimensionator to achieve his goal of exterminating organic life in all universes. It was released on June 11, 2021, for the PS5, and on Windows on July 26, 2023.

=== Other games ===
==== Size Matters ====
Ratchet & Clank: Size Matters (erroneously known as Ratchet & Clank 5 in Japan) was released in North America on February 13, 2007, on the PlayStation Portable and March 11, 2008, on the PS2. The development was performed this time by High Impact Games, composed, partially, of former Insomniac Games employees. In the game, Ratchet and Clank's vacation is cut short as they soon find themselves lured into a mysterious quest. Following the trail of a kidnapped girl named Luna, the duo rediscover a forgotten race of genius inventors known as the Technomites.

In this installment, new and recurring weapons and gadgets are introduced, and the skill points and weapon upgrading systems make their return. The armor system has been altered compared to previous games; there are seven types of armor available, all of which are found in different pieces (helmet, body, gloves and boots) on different planets. Once a complete set of armor is found and equipped, it can enhance specific player abilities.

==== Secret Agent Clank ====
Announced at the 2007 Tokyo Game Show, Secret Agent Clank was developed by High Impact Games, who developed Size Matters. It is available for the PSP and was released on June 17, 2008. This game was released for the PlayStation 2 on May 26, 2009.

The game focuses on Clank as the playable character, due to Ratchet being wrongfully imprisoned, emphasizing the "Secret Agent Clank" persona suggested in previous games. Gameplay features the series' standard focus on using gadgets and engaging enemies in combat, but also introduces sequences requiring stealth.

==== All 4 One ====
An Insomniac Games production that was revealed at Gamescom 2010 on August 17, 2010. The game has online multiplayer and 4-player co-op featuring the use of drop-in/drop-out, offline/online gameplay. The game mainly focuses on this cooperative play. Teammates can work together, even using weapons between players. Players can take control of Ratchet, Clank, Captain Qwark and Dr. Nefarious. It was released on October 18, 2011.

In All 4 One, Ratchet and Clank retire from their adventures as superheroes after the election of Captain Qwark as the Galactic President. Dr. Nefarious tricks him into going to Luminopolis by telling him that he would have gotten a prize for his heroic acts. Qwark invites Ratchet and Clank to come with him and, after arriving, they discover the ruse, but Dr. Nefarious brings a Light-Eating Z'Grute back to life. The Light-Eating Z'Grute gets out of Nefarious' control, however, and they all work together to stop it. After killing the Light-Eating Z'Grute, they get captured by a mysterious drone, but they break free thanks to a little Tharpod girl called Susie. After escaping, they realize they are on an unknown planet and that if they want to get back home, they will have to cooperate.

==== Full Frontal Assault ====
Full Frontal Assault (QForce outside of North America) was announced on May 30, 2011. The game was announced as part of a 'surprise' from Insomniac Games to mark the 10th anniversary since the original game was released.

The gameplay is described as a tower defense, a deviation from the platforming/combat common to the rest of the series, where Ratchet has to fight enemies over 5 levels on 3 different planets. It was released on November 27, 2012, on the PS3 with the PlayStation Vita version delayed until May 21, 2013.

=== Remake ===
==== Ratchet & Clank (2016) ====
Three years after Into the Nexus, the longest gap between games since the series began, a remake of the first game was released on April 12, 2016, for PS4. The game was delayed to match the release date of the film it is based on, also titled Ratchet & Clank. It features many of the same planets, levels, and characters from the first game, all of which have been extensively upgraded, both graphically and in terms of gameplay. New characters have been added, and existing ones extensively altered, with the Galactic Rangers from Ratchet & Clank 3 serving a completely different purpose in this game. The plot largely follows the same basic structure as the original game. Both Ratchet and Clank are playable, though critics and fans alike voiced their concerns regarding the game having lost its humor, edge and tone compared to the original game, the new characterization of Drek and Nefarious, as well as neglecting key character developments due to the story being under-developed.

=== Mobile games ===
==== Going Mobile ====
Going Mobile is the series' first game for mobile phones. Ratchet and Clank are trapped inside the McGuFFin and they have to get out.

==== Clone Home ====
Clone Home is an originally unreleased but now playable mobile game which was developed by Javaground as the follow-up to Going Mobile. Intended for publication by Sony Pictures Mobile on J2ME phones like its predecessor, it was cancelled before its slated release on September 1, 2006. An encrypted copy was found installed on a Sony Ericsson W880i in December 2021. It was unencrypted in October 2025 and posted on archive.org for access by the general public, after nearly two decades of being assumed lost.

==== Before the Nexus ====
Before the Nexus is an "endless-running" mobile tie-in game to promote Into the Nexus. Players have to collect bolts and defeat enemies. The game was released on December 19, 2013, for iOS and Android platforms. The game allowed players to collect Raritanium and sync it with their PlayStation Network account to unlock weapon upgrades in Into the Nexus.

==== Ranger Rumble ====
Ranger Rumble was an online free-to-play multiplayer arena third-person shooter mobile game being developed by Oh BiBi. The game was announced on November 12, 2025, and was slated for release on the iOS and Android platforms. Ahead of a global release, it was soft-launched in November 2025 in certain select regions of the world. However, in November 2026, it was cancelled.

=== Compilation ===
==== Ratchet & Clank Collection ====
Ratchet & Clank Collection (known as The Ratchet & Clank Trilogy in Europe) is a video game compilation that contains high-definition remastered ports of the PlayStation 2 games Ratchet & Clank, Going Commando, and Up Your Arsenal for the PS3 on a single Blu-ray Disc as a Classics HD title, published by Sony Computer Entertainment. The games were originally developed by Insomniac Games, who have assisted in the remastering alongside Idol Minds to provide support for high-definition monitors, higher frame rates, stereoscopic 3D, and additional features for the PlayStation Network. The HD collection was released on June 29, 2012, in Europe and on August 28, 2012, in North America. A PlayStation Vita version of the Collection was released in Europe on July 2, 2014, and it was released in North America on July 29, 2014. The Vita version was again ported by Insomniac Games, but this time with help from Mass Media.

== Setting ==
Ratchet & Clank is set in a fictional universe that emphasizes interplanetary travel within several different galaxies. Numerous biological and robotic species populate these planets, which range from highly developed metropolises to uncolonized biospheres. The Future series introduced additional elements of time travel and interdimensional travel within certain levels.

=== Lombaxes ===
The Lombax is a fictional species from the series. Lombaxes originated from the planet Fastoon and resemble bipedal anthropomorphic felines with a lion-like tail. Unlike most other organic species in the games' universe, which have two fingers and a thumb on each hand, Lombaxes possess a human-like hand configuration (four fingers and a thumb on each hand). The species has an instinctive affinity towards gadgetry and machines. The only Lombaxes featured in the series are Ratchet, Angela Cross, Alister Azimuth and Rivet. Ratchet's father is mentioned by Azimuth, but is never actually seen in the series. Ratchet is left as the last known Lombax in his dimension after A Crack in Time, as Azimuth dies and Angela is missing in action; her current location is unknown.

== Major characters ==
=== Ratchet and Clank ===
The main characters in the series are Ratchet, a Lombax mechanic from the planet Veldin, and his robotic best friend Clank, who was introduced in the first game as a defective model that escaped from a robot factory on Quartu. In Ratchet & Clank Future: Tools of Destruction, Ratchet is re-established to be the last known member of his species (ignoring the previous appearance of fellow Lombax, Angela Cross, in Going Commando), and in A Crack in Time, it is revealed Clank has a Zoni father named Orvus, who was said to have deliberately created Clank for a cosmic purpose. The player controls Ratchet for the majority of each game (with the exception of Secret Agent Clank), though certain missions will require the player to directly control Clank. Otherwise, Clank sits on Ratchet's back (in a backpack-style fashion) and is used to provide useful jumping, hovering and diving abilities through various upgrades. These upgrades are given over the course of the first game, but Clank retains them through the later ones.

=== Captain Qwark ===
Captain Copernicus Leslie Qwark (voiced by Jim Ward, 2002–2021; Scott Whyte, 2021–present) is the Solana Galaxy's self-proclaimed superhero, though he is in reality a cowardly blowhard whose egotistical actions frequently cause more trouble for Ratchet and Clank. Before becoming an "ally" from Ratchet & Clank: Up Your Arsenal and on, he started as the secondary antagonist of the original Ratchet & Clank game and the main antagonist of the direct sequel Going Commando.

=== The Plumber ===
The Plumber (voiced by Neil Flynn in the first three games, Jess Harnell in later appearances) is a staple of the Ratchet & Clank series. He almost always appears with his rear end sticking out of whatever he is working on, and can be surprisingly helpful when he appears. In Ratchet & Clank and Going Commando, the Plumber is an NPC that appears on separate occasions. Once later in Going Commando, he sells Ratchet an item to exchange for another. In Up Your Arsenal, he returns to ask Ratchet to search for Sewer Crystals, which he will trade bolts for.

The Plumber does not appear in Deadlocked; although the credits state that he had been called away to deal with a "sump pump emergency in the Rygylian Nebula". He appears with a non-speaking role as a memory in part of a dream-state world level in Size Matters, and also appears in Secret Agent Clank to fix the showers at the prison in which Ratchet is incarcerated, returning them to their typical freezing cold temperature.

The Plumber returns in Tools of Destruction, with a new updated design, wearing glasses and having a more detailed outfit. He provides Ratchet with a spare part for the Dimensionator that proves valuable in the game's climax. He then appears once again in A Crack in Time in Clank's memory banks. When Clank shows up, The Plumber states that he "must've taken a wrong turn somewhere" and mistook it for Qwark's mind because of the "emptiness". He then tells Clank "I wouldn't risk any more than six minutes", a piece of advice that ultimately allows Clank to save Ratchet from death by reversing time.

He appears in All 4 One when he fixes a transport that allows Ratchet and his allies to travel to Uzo City, but when Ratchet asks for some "cryptic advice" that can used to stop Nevo, the Plumber admits that he does not have any. In Full Frontal Assault, Stuart Zurgo hologuises as him to damage the Starship Phoenix II. The real Plumber later contacts Ratchet, Clank and Qwark for assistance since he is stuck on a planet. After Ratchet repairs the Plumber's ride, he is confused as he had seen him on the starship. It is after the Plumber leaves that Ratchet and the other two realize that they had been fooled by Stuart.

The Plumber appears again in Into the Nexus as the apparent creator of the game's version of the RYNO super weapon, the RYNO VII. He split up the blueprints for it in order to prevent misuse. The player can collect the pieces of the blueprint and have the Plumber build it for them.

He reprises his original position in the 2016 Ratchet & Clank remake in the Novalis sewers, only this time, his last words to Ratchet and Clank before leaving the scene are, "See you in the next reboot."

The Plumber appears at the end of the final credits screen of the Ratchet & Clank film.

The Plumber appears in the Ratchet & Clank comics in Issue 6: Bros Before Foes. Ratchet, Talwyn Apogee and Vorn Garblak nearly drown after attempting to swim to the opposite side of an aqueduct in the Apogee Space Station, as the door from the inside is locked shut. The Plumber unlocked the door from the outside and pulled the three out just before they faced certain death, warning them that the aqueduct is not designed for swimming.

The Plumber is briefly described by Gary, his son, in Rift Apart, while talking to Clank inside a Dimensional Anomaly.

=== Big Al ===
A recurring character who first appears in the original Ratchet & Clank, Big Al (voiced by Chris Hatfield) is the stereotypical computer geek from planet Kerwan with interests in electronics and all things Captain Qwark. Ratchet frequently gets baffled over Al's "techno-speak" and usually relies on Clank to translate. He owns "Big Al's Robo Shack" and supplies Clank with a Heli-Pack. His siblings Bob and Edwina (both which are featured in the Ratchet & Clank) also own similar Robo Shacks that provide further upgrades for Clank.

In Up Your Arsenal, Big Al is chosen to join Captain Qwark's "Q-Force" for his mastery of electronics, though his involvement in the plot is minimal. Al plays a more significant role during the events of Ratchet: Deadlocked, in which he is captured and made to serve as part of Ratchet's DreadZone support crew. At one point, Al is shot by Ace Hardlight as a warning to Ratchet not to overstep his bounds, but he later returns (with cybernetic parts to cover his wounds) to aid Ratchet in escaping DreadZone. He has not appeared in the original series since, though he is occasionally mentioned during Tools of Destruction and can be heard during a radio advertisement for his Robo Shack in A Crack in Time. Al has a minor role in the comic series, he works on returning Veldin back to its normal orbit after Artemis Zogg removes it for his own galaxy.

He also appears in the 2016 reimagining, serving the same role as he did in the original game while also later appearing on Pokitaru (replacing Bob), in which he aides the duo again, by installing an upgrade for their ship.

=== Angela Cross ===
Angela Cross (voiced by Kath Soucie) is a female Lombax who appears in Going Commando. She shares Ratchet's affinity for gadgets and devices, though is frequently clumsy and scatterbrained. Despite her shortcomings, Angela was employed by Megacorp and worked in its genetics division on a secret project to create an artificial "Protopet", until she quit when her boss, Mr. Fizzwidget pushed the release date of the creation before she could correct its flaws (namely, its large appetite and savage nature). Angela then disguised herself and stole the prototype creature to get rid of it for good. When Megacorp recruits Ratchet to get it back from her, she hires the mercenary/crime organization Thugs-4-Less to protect her, and tries to get Ratchet out of the way by using his partner Clank as bait. Unfortunately, both tactics fail, and when Thugs-4-Less is bought out of their contract by a third party, Angela (after her identity was revealed) allies herself with Ratchet and Clank to stop Megacorp from releasing the still-highly dangerous Protopet all over the galaxy.

Despite being confirmed as a Lombax in A Crack in Time, Angela has not appeared in any games since Going Commando. During a Polaris News broadcast in A Crack in Time, Angela was confirmed as being a Lombax, that she had fled Bogon in Max Apogee's ship during the earlier phases of Tachyon's invasion, and had been missing along with Apogee for over three years, suggesting both she and Apogee used the Dimensionator to escape Tachyon. The report also confirms her species as a female Lombax, claiming that female Lombaxes do not have tails. In a Full Moon Show Podcast, it was stated that Angela may be brought back if Insomniac Games makes another Ratchet & Clank game.

=== Talwyn Apogee ===
Talwyn Apogee (voiced by Tara Strong in Tools of Destruction and Quest for Booty, Ali Hillis in Into the Nexus) is a Markazian and the daughter of Max Apogee, a famous explorer known for his research into the Lombax culture. When Max vanished, Talwyn continued her father's work in finding the "Lombax Secret", a device said to have been used to eliminate the evil Cragmites from the galaxy. Her main base of operations is a space station in the Nundac asteroid ring, where she is accompanied by her guardian warbots Cronk and Zephyr.

In Tools of Destruction, Ratchet is led to Talwyn after intercepting a message from Emperor Tachyon calling for her death. After explaining his situation, Talwyn agrees to help Ratchet in finding the Lombax Secret and overthrowing Tachyon. In Quest for Booty, Talwyn journeys alongside Ratchet in his search for Clank. She does not physically appear in A Crack in Time, but is seen in Clank's subconscious and is occasionally mentioned on the radio as having requested songs for Ratchet to listen to while flying through space. She also appears in the comic book mini-series, as well as Full Frontal Assault as a skin and a full appearance in Into the Nexus. Talwyn is also briefly mentioned in Rift Apart and appears in its end credits sequence.

In the 2016 film and re-imagined game, a character named Cora Veralux (voiced by Bella Thorne) is believed to be Talwyn's counterpart.

==== Cronk and Zephyr ====
Cronk and Zephyr (voiced by Daniel Hagen and Paul Eiding respectively) are a pair of war-robots who frequently accompany Talwyn in her adventures. Heavily rusted and senile from many years of combat, the pair are often heard bickering to each other and rambling about their past experiences but nonetheless serve as reliable allies in Ratchet and Talwyn's search for the Lombax Secret. The pair first appear in Tools of Destruction and make a voice-only cameo in A Crack in Time as they bicker during the credits. In All 4 One, Cronk and Zephyr serve as Ratchet's support team by selling him and his allies weapons. Both are killed by Vendra Prog in Into the Nexus, though their ghosts make a final appearance in the post-credits sequence.

=== Alister Azimuth ===
General Alister Azimuth (voiced by Joey D'Auria) is a Lombax and serves as a mentor to Ratchet. He has white and red fur, unlike Ratchet and Angela who have yellow and brown/orange fur. This is not due to age, because although Alister is much older than Ratchet, his fur has been this color since his youth. He uses a double-headed Praetorian Omniwrench as his weapon of choice. In his youth, Azimuth was close friends with Ratchet's father, Kaden, and carries a pocketwatch that holds a photo of the two of them standing together. Azimuth was indirectly responsible for Emperor Tachyon's rise to power and the deaths of Ratchet's parents, as he gave Tachyon full access to Lombax technology in the hopes that he would be able to help them. For his crimes, he was forbidden to join the Lombaxes as they left to another dimension, and has lived in exile ever since.

Azimuth appears to rescue Ratchet and Clank after they defeat Dr. Nefarious and takes them to the Great Clock. Despite Azimuth's insistence, Ratchet still refuses to risk using the Great Clock, causing the elder Lombax to kill Ratchet by blasting him with his wrench out of anger. Azimuth then tries to enter the Orvus Chamber, but Clank locks him out and uses the Great Clock to reverse time by six minutes (as previously hinted by the Plumber) so that he can save Ratchet. Azimuth, now blinded by his own selfish desire to save all the Lombaxes, breaks into the chamber and locks the Clock into turning back time to Tachyon's rise to power, before engaging both Ratchet and Clank in a bloody duel as the game's final boss. Once defeated, Azimuth finally realizes his mistake and stops the time shift he created at the cost of his life.

=== Kaden ===
Kaden is the father of Ratchet and the keeper of the Dimensionator. When the Lombaxes were driven to use the device to escape to another dimension following Percival Tachyon's overrunning of Fastoon, Kaden refused to follow them in order to protect the device. Kaden managed to survive Tachyon's ravaging of Fastoon and was able to hide his infant son (Ratchet) from the Cragmite by sending him to Veldin, but Kaden was eventually found and executed by Tachyon.

=== Orvus ===
Appearing in Ratchet & Clank Future: A Crack in Time, Orvus (voiced by Charles Martinet) is the unique Zoni who created the Great Clock as its original Caretaker and is also Clank's "father", as he is responsible for Clank's possession of a soul. After he is captured by Dr. Nefarious, Orvus teleports to somewhere unknown, and Clank is brought to the Great Clock by the Zoni to become its new Caretaker in his absence. As Clank is trained by the Clock's Junior Caretaker Sigmund (another robot that Orvus possibly granted a soul to) in his new duties, Orvus communicates with him through a series of simulated programs stored in his memory banks.

At the end of the game, Clank chooses to continue his adventures with Ratchet and leaves Sigmund in charge of the Great Clock as the Caretaker, and Orvus's final message proclaims that his greatest desire is for Clank to be happy with whatever life he chooses.

=== Sasha Phyronix ===
Sasha Phyronix (voiced by Leslie Carrara-Rudolph) is a Cazar who is the captain of the Starship Phoenix and the daughter of the Galactic President. During the events of Up Your Arsenal, she is in charge of coordinating the Galactic Rangers to combat the growing threat of Dr. Nefarious. She and Ratchet appear to have feelings for each other. In Deadlocked, she briefly appears in the opening to inform Ratchet, Clank and Big Al about the death of Captain Starshield during his service to Dreadzone as a contestant. Sasha is also about to warn the three about various galactic heroes being captured when she is cut off. She appears a third time in the six issue comic series (set between A Crack in Time and All 4 One), where she assists Ratchet and Clank in stopping Artemis Zogg in his plans to create his own artificial galaxy. Despite being considered Ratchet's love interest for a while and vice versa, it appears that after the initial relationship the couple eventually broke up due to a series of disagreements. In Full Frontal Assault, Ratchet still kept the Starship Phoenix, which means that he still cares about Sasha despite their falling out.

=== Skid McMarx ===
Skid McMarx (voiced by Neil Flynn in the first game and Up Your Arsenal, Jess Harnell in the 2016 game and Rift Apart) is a professional hoverboarder. In Ratchet & Clank, he and his agent are attacked by missiles from the Blarg and end up crashing their ship on Planet Aridia while en route to a big hover-board race, they end up being separated after the crash. Ratchet and Clank eventually find him, he tells the duo that he is unable to return to his ship because of the Sand Sharks in the area. After Ratchet disposes of the creatures, Skid rewards him with a hover-board and tells Ratchet and Clank about seeing them at the hover-board race on Rilgar.

In Ratchet & Clank: Up Your Arsenal, Skidd is recruited into Captain Qwark's Q-Force for his "nerves of steel". Calling himself "ShaddowDude", Skidd helps Ratchet and Clank on their assigned mission on Aquatos, despite frequently chickening out and letting Ratchet do all the fighting. He later gets kidnapped by Courtney Gears and is taken to Obani Draco, where he is used as a test dummy for the Biobliterator and turned into a robot. Despite this, Skidd is back to normal by the end of the game (how he was changed back is not revealed, though Big Al mentions that it is possible). Following Up Your Arsenal Skidd is mentioned as having been picked up by Courtney Gears' old record label.

=== Helga von Streissenburgen ===
Helga von Streissenburgen (voiced by Mona Marshall) is a robot who is Captain Qwark's portly, heavyset fitness trainer. In Ratchet & Clank, Ratchet runs through a fitness course to meet up with Helga in order to claim the reward, a Swingshot, though she also demands that Ratchet must pay for the gadget after stating that his run was "the most pathetic display I has ever seen on that Obstacle course!". Helga is chosen to join the Q-Force for her "sensual powers of seduction" in Ratchet & Clank: Up Your Arsenal.

Douglass C. Perry of IGN commented positively in the "quirkier" voices in the supporting cast of Ratchet & Clank and cited Helga (describing her as "the weird athletic woman at the end of the stunt course") as an example.

=== Skrunch ===
Skrunch (voiced by Jim Ward) is Captain Qwark's one-eyed monkey sidekick. Being a monkey, he loves bananas. He's also seen running around the Starship Phoenix's bridge. Skrunch joins Clank during some of Clank's missions in Up Your Arsenal to activate out-of-range buttons or distract powerful enemies and is a gunner for Ratchet on Tyrranosis. Skrunch also makes an appearance in Size Matters. He speaks to Clank twice in the game, first on planet Metalis and again at the end of the game on Quadrona.

=== Grimroth Razz ===
Exclusive to the re-imaged project, Grimroth Razz (voiced by John Goodman in the film, Travis Willingham in the 2016 game), or Grim for short, is a mechanic from the Polaris Galaxy who became the mentor and legal guardian of Ratchet ever since he found him as an infant. He owns a garage on the planet Veldin where he and Ratchet repair ships.

In the 2016 video game, Grimroth is revealed to have a twin brother named Felton. Grimroth states that they don't talk much because Grimroth considers Felton to be a slacker.

=== Doctor Nefarious ===
Doctor Nefarious (voiced by Armin Shimerman) is a robotic mad scientist and supervillain with a deep, distinct hatred for organic lifeforms. He is the arch-nemesis of Captain Qwark and later of Ratchet and Clank. Throughout the series, Nefarious is always accompanied by his loyal robotic butler, Lawrence, who often proves to be much more shrewd than his pompous master. Whenever he loses his temper or is put under extreme stress, Nefarious instantly malfunctions and freezes up, while radio waves of episodes from the fictional soap opera series Lance and Janice are broadcast through his mind, until he is whacked behind the head by Lawrence or someone else.

=== Emperor Percival Tachyon ===
Emperor Percival Tachyon (voiced by Andy Morris) was raised by Lombaxes, but when he discovered that the Lombaxes banned his race from the universe he eventually did the same to them, only Ratchet, Alister Azimuth, Kaden and his wife (these two killed by Tachyon), and apparently also Angela Cross, stayed behind. This makes Tachyon a personal enemy of Ratchet's. He also created the Space Pirates, at least those featured in Tools of Destruction and Quest for Booty, including Captains Romulus Slag and Angstrom Darkwater and also Rusty Pete.

=== Chairman Alonzo Drek ===
Ultimate Supreme Executive Chairman Drek (voiced by Kevin Michael Richardson in the original game, Paul Giamatti in the film, Eric Bauza in the 2016 video game) is the CEO of Drek Industries and dictator of the Blarg race. He is the first antagonist faced by Ratchet & Clank and thus a pivotal antagonist in the series.

In his review of Ratchet & Clank, Gavin Frankle of Allgame stated that Chairman Drek's scenes (along with Captain Qwark's) proved to be more entertaining than those of the main characters.

==== Zed ====
Zed (voiced by Andrew Cowndon in the 2016 film, Sam Riegel in the 2016 video game) is a small hovering robot who is Chairman Drek's assistant who is exclusive to the re-imaging project.

==== Robot Lieutenant ====
The Robot Lieutenant (voiced by Neil Flynn) is a large intimidating robot minion of Chairman Drek who works as the second-in-command of his robot army. The Robot Lieutenant was responsible for the deforestation of Eudora. When Ratchet and Clank confronted him on Eudora, the Robot Lieutenant fled upon being intimidated by Ratchet's OmniWrench.

In the 2016 re-imaging film and video games, the Robot Lieutenant is re-imaged as Victor Von Ion (voiced by Sylvester Stallone in the film, Mark Silverman in the video game).

== Gameplay ==
The Ratchet & Clank games feature a mix of platforming, action and role-playing gameplay elements presented in the third-person perspective, focused on the use of unique weapons and gadgets that Ratchet gains over the course of each game. Ratchet starts each game with his versatile Omniwrench for melee attacks, but new weapons are made available by completing missions or buying them through a weapon vendor. Most weapons have a limited amount of ammunition, requiring the player to use ammunition efficiently to avoid running out of firepower. Ammunition can be restocked from vendors or by breaking crates scattered about the levels. In most later games, weapons can be upgraded through both repeated use of the weapon and by purchasing weapon modifications. The weapons in each game can range from standard weapon archetypes such as machine guns or sniper rifles to unique weapons such as transformation guns and decoy launchers. Typically, the weapon set is a mixture of new weapons for the current title, and weapons returning from a previous title. In the case of Going Commando (2003) and Up Your Arsenal (2004), the weapons returning from the previous game can either be purchased or the save file from the previous game can be used to obtain them for free and/or a reduced price.

In addition to weapons, Ratchet gains many gadgets with varying uses. Some gadgets are necessary to traverse some stages of levels, such as the "Grind Boots" that allow Ratchet to grind on rails, or a "Swingshot" (portable, reusable grappling hook) that allows him to grapple a target and swing across gaps. Other gadgets can be used in combat as a means to distract foes, and others are needed to unlock certain doors and thus continue missions; in these cases, the player typically must solve a puzzle minigame in order to successfully use the gadget and unlock the door.

Each game is broken down into a series of missions that take place on numerous planets across the galaxy. While most objectives must be completed in a certain order to progress the main story, other objectives are optional but can lead to useful rewards. Once the player has completed a mission on a planet, they can typically return to any previous planet they have visited to attempt missions they could not complete before. In addition to objectives based on platforming and weapon elements, missions may include minigames such as various races and arena combat. Typically, one or two of these minigames must be performed as part of the main story, but further optional challenges can be done to earn greater rewards, typically in the form of "bolts", the unit of currency used throughout the game. There are also missions that focus on Clank, often controlling a set of smaller robots called Gadgebots to travel through areas that Ratchet cannot. Clank's gameplay sections in mainline titles after Tools of Destruction (2007) are also considerably more experimental in their gameplay mechanics.

In addition to the main gameplay missions, the player can attempt to find special large gold bolts that are typically hidden or difficult to get to that can be used to upgrade or buy powerful weapons. There are also Skill Points spread throughout the game, which require the player to complete a specific task guided only by the name of the Skill Point. Skill Points are used to unlock extra features such as concept artwork or additional outfits for Ratchet. Each game (excluding Quest for Booty, All 4 One, and Full Frontal Assault) also presents a "Challenge Mode", available after the player has completed the main story; in this mode, the player replays the game, facing more difficult enemies in exchange for a higher bolt payout or more powerful weapon upgrades.

== Reception ==
Aggregate review scores
Game	Year	GameRankings	Metacritic
Ratchet & Clank	2002	90%	88/100
Ratchet & Clank: Going Commando	2003	91%	90/100
Ratchet & Clank: Up Your Arsenal	2004	92%	91/100
Ratchet: Deadlocked	2005	83%	81/100
Ratchet & Clank: Going Mobile	2005	76%	
Ratchet & Clank: Size Matters	2007	PS2: 64% PSP: 85%	PS2: 62/100; PSP: 85/100
Ratchet & Clank Future: Tools of Destruction	2007	89%	89/100
Secret Agent Clank	2008	PS2: 61% PSP: 74%	PS2: 61/100; PSP: 72/100
Ratchet & Clank Future: Quest for Booty	2008	78%	76/100
Ratchet & Clank Future: A Crack in Time	2009	88%	87/100
Ratchet & Clank: All 4 One	2011	71%	70/100
Ratchet & Clank Collection	2012	PS3: 84% PSV: 81%	PS3: 83/100; PSV: 76/100
Ratchet & Clank: Full Frontal Assault	2012	PS3: 65% PSV: 54%	PS3: 64/100
Ratchet & Clank: Before the Nexus	2013	57%	54/100
Ratchet & Clank: Into the Nexus	2013	77%	76/100
Ratchet & Clank	2016	86%	85/100
Ratchet & Clank: Rift Apart	2021		88/100

Games in the Ratchet & Clank series have been met with mixed to universally acclaimed reviews, with review aggregator scores ranging from 54/100 to 91/100 on Metacritic, and 57% to 92% on GameRankings. The first three games, Ratchet & Clank, Going Commando, and Up Your Arsenal in particular have all been met with critical acclaim. None of the core games in the series (Ratchet & Clank to Deadlocked, the Future series, the PS4 game, and Rift Apart) have been rated below 76/100 on Metacritic. 2016's Ratchet & Clank became the fastest-selling game of the franchise.

== Other media ==
=== Manga ===
A manga of Ratchet & Clank named Ratchet & Clank: Bang Bang Bang! Critical Danger of the Galaxy Legend (ラチェット & クランク ガガガ! 銀河のがけっぷち伝説, Rachetto & Kuranku: Ga Ga Ga! Ginga no Gakeppuchi Densetsu) was serialized starting in February 2004 in the bi-monthly edition of the Japanese magazine CoroCoro Comic. It is drawn by Shinbo Nomura, and has finished in the February 2008 edition of the magazine.

=== Film adaptation ===
A theatrical Ratchet & Clank animated feature film adaptation was announced in April 2013, with a planned release in 2015 but was delayed to 2016. It eventually released on April 29, 2016. The film was developed by the Blockade Entertainment Studios and Rainmaker Entertainment, the same production company that produced the world's first half-hour, entirely computer animated television series ReBoot, and is distributed by Focus Features and Gramercy Pictures, along with partnerships from Sony Interactive Entertainment (formerly Sony Computer Entertainment) and Insomniac Games. The film is presented in 3D CGI, and works with the in-game models during the pre-visualization stage to help block out the film. Insomniac's writer, T.J. Fixman, wrote the script, and principal voice actors James Arnold Taylor, David Kaye, Jim Ward, and Armin Shimerman respectively reprised their roles as Ratchet, Clank, Qwark, and Nefarious for the film. Other members of the cast included Paul Giamatti, John Goodman, Bella Thorne, Rosario Dawson and Sylvester Stallone. The film is a retelling of the events of the original game detailing how Ratchet and Clank first met, as well as their fight against Chairman Drek.

=== Short film ===
A short film entitled Ratchet & Clank: Life of Pie, was exclusively released on Crave TV in Canada. The film was produced by Mainframe Studios, who produced the 2016 film when they were known as Rainmaker Entertainment. This also marks the final time Jim Ward voiced Captain Qwark before his retirement in 2021 and death in 2025.

=== Merchandise ===
Official strategy guide books, published by Prima Games or Brady Games, have been released for almost all installments in the series. A comic book series consisting of 6 issues was written by T.J. Fixman with art by Adam Archer and was released by Wildstorm from September 2010 to February 2011, with the full series compiled into one book in July 2011. Other merchandise includes action figures, statues, plush toys, and clothing available through various vendors, conventions, promotions or employee-only events.

=== Other video games ===
Since its inception, Easter eggs, extra content and references to the Ratchet & Clank series have been present in various other Sony Computer Entertainment-licensed properties, such as Jak and Daxter, Sly Cooper, LittleBigPlanet, and Resistance. The title characters have been playable in Sony's PlayStation Home, PlayStation Move Heroes, and PlayStation All-Stars Battle Royale crossover games; they have also been playable in various non-Sony games, for example Mediatonic's Fall Guys and Innersloth's Among Us. Additionally, many weapons in Gearbox’s first-person shooter title Borderlands 3 makes direct references to the series, such as a rocket launcher named R.Y.N.A.H. referencing the iconic R.Y.N.O. weapons of Ratchet & Clank.
