= David Bergeaud =

French composer

- Also known as: KOR
- Born: 1968 (age 57–58); Paris, France
- Genres: Video game; film score; orchestral; electronica; trip hop; breakbeat; industrial; rock; world; jazz; lounge
- Occupations: Composer; multi-instrumentalist; record producer
- Instruments: Keyboards; guitar; percussion
- Years active: 1986–present
- Website: bergeaud.com

David Bergeaud (born 1968) also known as "KOR", is a French film, television, and video game composer, as well as a multi-instrumentalist and record producer. Bergeaud has composed scores for such noteworthy projects as the popular PlayStation series Ratchet & Clank (2002–2008) and the award-winning television series Strong Medicine (2000–2006) and The Outer Limits, and the controversial feature-length documentary film, Kurt & Courtney (1998).

Bergeaud has lent his musical skills on some of the projects produced and directed by the likes of director Steven Spielberg (Earth 2), Ang Lee (Lust, Caution), Robert Zemeckis (Death Becomes Her), Barry Josephson (Secret Agent Man), Walter Salles (The Motorcycle Diaries), Jane Campion (In the Cut), Alejandro González Iñárritu (21 Grams), Barry Levinson (Sphere), Mike Figgis (Miss Julie), Roman Polanski (The Pianist), George Miller (Lorenzo's Oil), Curtis Hanson (The River Wild), Bill Brillstein (C-16: FBI) Brad Grey (C-16: FBI) and Raffaella De Laurentiis (Dragon: The Bruce Lee Story, Vanishing Son).

== Early life ==
David Bergeaud was born in 1968 in Paris, France. His father a successful stage director and choreographer, and his mother Christine Nerac, a well known singer, raised him while on tour through much of Europe, the Middle East and East Africa. David began his musical education at the age of 5 and, after ten years of classical conservatory and private studies, moved to Los Angeles, California to explore jazz and contemporary electronic music.

== Awards and nominations ==
BMI Film Music Award

NOMINATIONS

- (2003; Strong Medicine)
- (2004; Strong Medicine)

WINS

- (2003; Strong Medicine)
- (2004; Strong Medicine)

== Video game soundtracks ==
- Disruptor (1996)
- Running Wild (1998)
- Ratchet & Clank (2002)
- Ratchet & Clank: Going Commando (2003)
- Ratchet & Clank: Up Your Arsenal (2004)
- Ratchet: Deadlocked (2005)
- Resistance: Fall of Man (2006)
- Ratchet & Clank: Size Matters (2007)
- Ratchet & Clank Future: Tools of Destruction (2007)
- Secret Agent Clank (2008)
- Ratchet & Clank Future: Quest for Booty (2008)
- Medieval Moves: Deadmund's Quest (2011)
- PlayStation Move Heroes (2011)
- Sports Champions 2 (2012)
- Warmachine: Tactics (2014)

== Film soundtracks ==
- Savage Harbor (1987)
- The Unnamable (1988)
- Twice Dead (1988)
- Street Soldiers (1990)
- The Unnamable II: The Statement of Randolph Carter (1993)
- College Kickboxers (1992)
- Vanishing Son (1994)
- Midnight Run for Your Life (1994)
- Another Midnight Run (1994)
- Donor Unknown (1995)
- Kinda Cute for a White Boy... (1996)
- Psycho Sushi (1997)
- Prince Valiant (1997)
- Sins of the Mind (1997)
- On the 2nd Day of Christmas (1997)
- Via Satellite (1998)
- Mr. Headmistress (1998)
- Wrongfully Accused (1998)
- Brookfield (1999)
- All You Need (2001)
- The Badge (2002)
- Hangman's Curse (2003)
- Set Point (2004)
- Anonymous Rex (2004)
- Day Break (2005)
- Three (2006)
- The Visitation (2006)
- Will-Endowed (2008)
- Iranian Chronicles (2008)

== Television soundtracks ==
- Earth 2 (1994)
- The Outer Limits (1995)
- C-16: FBI (1997)
- FreakyLinks (2000)
- Secret Agent Man (2000)
- Strong Medicine (2000)
- Tales from the Neverending Story (2001)
- FreakyLinks (2001)
- The D.A. (2004)
- Bollywood Hero (2009)

== Documentary soundtracks ==
- Aileen Wuornos: The Selling of a Serial Killer (1992)
- Tracking Down Maggie (1994)
- Heidi Fleiss: Hollywood Madam (1996)
- Kurt & Courtney (1998)
- The Spider Wrangler: The Spiders of Hangman's Curse (2004)
- Frank Peretti: From Page to Screen (2004)
- The Glass House (2009)
- American Coup (2010)
