= QFB =

QFB may refer to:

- Ratchet & Clank Future: Quest for Booty, the eighth game in the Ratchet & Clank video game series
- Freiburg Hauptbahnhof, Freiburg, Germany railway station (IATA airport code)
