= Ratchet & Clank: Full Frontal Assault =

2012 action video game

- North American box art
- Developers: Insomniac Games; Tin Giant (PS Vita)
- Publisher: Sony Computer Entertainment
- Directors: Shaun McCabe; Chad Dezern
- Composer: Michael Bross
- Series: Ratchet & Clank
- Platforms: PlayStation 3, PlayStation Vita
- Release: PlayStation 3: NA: November 27, 2012; AU: November 29, 2012; EU: November 30, 2012; PlayStation Vita: NA: May 21, 2013; AU: May 22, 2013
- Genres: Platform, tower defense
- Modes: Single-player, multiplayer

Ratchet & Clank: Full Frontal Assault (known as Ratchet & Clank: QForce in PAL countries and Japan) is a 2012 platform game developed by Insomniac Games and published by Sony Computer Entertainment for the PlayStation 3. Part of the Ratchet & Clank series, it was produced in commemoration of the original game's 10th anniversary. Like the previous downloadable game in the series, Ratchet & Clank Future: Quest for Booty, it was released on Blu-ray Disc as well as the PlayStation Store. The release of the PlayStation Vita version was delayed to May 21, 2013, when it became available for free with the PlayStation 3 version.

The game received mostly average reviews from critics. It was criticised for its short length, lack of a proper story, the new tower defense element, lackluster campaign experience and severe deviations from previous games in the series, with many calling it the worst game in the series. However, it did receive praise for its soundtrack, multiplayer mode, and replay value.

== Gameplay ==
Full Frontal Assault uses the camera angles, weapons and third-person Ratchet gameplay used in previous versions, while adding a new tower defense element. It features five levels set on three different planets. The game allows players to play as Ratchet, Clank (in either his Giant Clank or normal forms), or Captain Qwark. This title also features the ability for co-op play, both on and offline.

== Reception ==
Reception

Aggregate score
Aggregator	Score
Metacritic	64/100 (PS3)

Review scores
Publication	Score
1Up.com	C (PS3)
Electronic Gaming Monthly	2/5 (PS3)
Eurogamer	6/10 (PS3)
Game Informer	7.5/10 (PS3)
GameSpot	7/10
GamesRadar+	3/5
IGN	6.4/10 (PS3); 5.7/10 (Vita)
PlayStation Official Magazine – UK	5/10 (PS3)
Pocket Gamer	2.5/5 (Vita)
Polygon	6/10
Push Square	6/10
PC World	3/5 (PS3)

Reception for Full Frontal Assault has been mixed, with the PlayStation 3 version holding a 64 average rating from 52 critics on Metacritic. Game Informer gave the game a 7.5/10 average score, calling it, "an interesting title hampered by some fundamental design flaws." Electronic Gaming Monthly gave it a 2/5, saying it, "fails both as a tower defense game and as a means to hold fans of the franchise over until Insomniac delivers a new mainline title." PlayStation Official Magazine – UK and Eurogamer echoed this sentiment, saying the game "erodes the series' identity" and has "no heart", respectively.

PC World said that the game lacks a story, estimating that the single player campaign mode can be completed in about four hours. It said the tower defense gameplay – while "neat" – makes it feel "more like a Dungeon Defenders clone than it does a Ratchet & Clank game." The review stated that the multiplayer version is where the game "really shines" but "isn't enough to outweigh the lackluster single-player experience". It awarded the game a 3/5 rating. Similarly, Marty Sliva of 1Up.com gave the game a C, stating "Full Frontal Assault is an interesting experiment that could have risen beyond the average with a bit more polish and creativity." GameSpot gave the game a seven out of ten, calling the arsenal "fun to use" and the multiplayer battles "exciting and unpredictable" while saying that anyone who hoped for a substantial single-player campaign would be disappointed. GamesRadar+ praised the platforming, tactical elements, exploration, and collectables while criticizing the lack of single-player campaign length and multiplayer modes.

IGN gave the PlayStation 3 version a 6.4/10, calling it "an experience that's simply middling", but citing its competitive multiplayer as the game's "real saving grace". They gave the Vita version a 5.7/10, calling it "less polished than its PlayStation 3 counterpart" despite the six-month delay, citing a frame rate that "routinely chugs", textures that load slowly, lackluster effects, and removed environmental elements such as foliage. Pocket Gamer had largely the same technical complaints as IGN with the Vita version, complaining of load times "regularly in excess of 20 seconds," textures "watered down to a horrible degree," "barely readable" text in parts of the game, and a "consistently terrible" frame rate which "sometimes even renders the game unplayable." However, they praised the story as "snappy" and the platforming and shooting as "still quite enjoyable", giving it a 2.5/5.
