= Ratchet & Clank (2016 video game) =

Platform video game

- Cover art featuring Ratchet (left) and Clank (right) along with several other characters in the background
- Developer: Insomniac Games
- Publisher: Sony Interactive Entertainment
- Directors: Shaun McCabe; Chad Dezern; Brian Allgeier
- Writer: TJ Fixman
- Composer: Michael Bross
- Series: Ratchet & Clank
- Platform: PlayStation 4
- Release: NA: April 12, 2016; PAL: April 20, 2016; UK: April 22, 2016
- Genres: Third-person shooter, platform
- Mode: Single-player

Ratchet & Clank (Note: Known as Ratchet & Clank: The Game in Japan) is a 2016 third-person shooter platform video game developed by Insomniac Games and published by Sony Interactive Entertainment for the PlayStation 4. It is a tie-in to the 2016 film of the same name, as well as a "reimagining" of the first game in the series. The game was originally planned to be released in 2015, but was delayed, along with the film, to April 2016 in order to give the film a better marketing campaign and the game additional polish time.

In contrast to the film, Ratchet & Clank received positive reviews upon release, with critics particularly praising the overall gameplay, controls, visuals, weapons, and world design. The game was followed by Ratchet & Clank: Rift Apart, which was released for the PlayStation 5 in June 2021.

The game was offered for free as a part of Sony's Play at Home initiative in March 2021.

== Gameplay ==
In Ratchet & Clank, players can use the Swingshot to grapple targets and swing across gaps. This gameplay mechanic was first featured in the original game.

Ratchet & Clank shares many gameplay similarities with the other entries in the series. The main playable character is Ratchet, although Clank is playable in several portions of the game. As Ratchet, the player navigates diverse environments, defeating enemies with an array of different weapons and gadgets, and traversing obstacles. Clank is attached to Ratchet like a backpack, performing several functions, such as allowing diving in water, gliding through the use of propellers, and on occasion, acting as a jetpack to allow flight. Clank's gameplay sections are drastically different, even though the premise of navigating environments and the controls remain the same. Clank is not equipped with weapons; instead, he utilizes punches to defeat enemies. Clank's gameplay sections mostly revolve around solving environmental puzzles, rather than defeating enemies.

Though Ratchet & Clank is a re-imagining of the 2002 video game, it has a variety of gameplay elements from different entries in the series, such as strafing, automatic weapon and health upgrades, manual Raritanium weapon upgrading, and the inclusion of weapons seen in later games. It features new weapons, such as the Pixelizer, which gives enemies an 8-bit appearance. Environments are presented in a somewhat linear manner, although multiple paths are available for the player. The player progresses through the story by travelling from planet to planet. New planets are unlocked once story objectives on previous planets have been completed. Aside from battling enemies, the player utilizes a Swingshot to cross gaps, rides grind rails to travel through levels, walks on magnetic surfaces, activates switches to open new paths, and occasionally must solve a hacking mini-game.

The player unlocks weapons and gadgets as the story progresses, but some are bought through vendors. Bolts, which are found in crates, dropped by defeated enemies and given as rewards, act as currency. Crates also contain health and ammunition. Items are used in several different ways. Gadgets are automatically equipped at certain points in levels, weapons must be equipped manually, and lastly, the OmniWrench, which acts as a melee weapon, is always equipped as it has a dedicated button. Several collectibles are present, such as holocards, which provide information about the world, and gold bolts, which unlock aesthetical extras. Skill points, which were prominent features in the previous games in the series, do not return, instead substituted by the PlayStation trophies system.

Racing, in the form of hoverboard races, and aerial combat missions, in which the player controls a spaceship, also appear in the game. Bosses, which are a mainstay in the series, are featured in some levels. After completing the game, the player may choose to enter "challenge mode", in which the game's difficulty level rises considerably, but most items, including all weapons, are carried through.

== Plot ==
Prisoner Shiv Helix is being moved to a joint cell with the newly imprisoned Captain Qwark, former commander of the legendary Galactic Rangers. As Shiv happens to be a huge fan of Qwark, he reveals that a "hologame" is being made based on his last adventure. Eager for attention, Qwark agrees to tell Shiv his side of the story.

On planet Veldin, Ratchet, a young Lombax who works as a mechanic, dreams of joining the Rangers. Despite passing all of their tests with flying colors, the Rangers refuse to accept him after learning of his criminal past. Meanwhile, in a factory on planet Quartu, Chairman Alonzo Drek of the Blarg oversees the construction of a mechanical army with his ally Dr. Nefarious, an evil scientist who was presumed dead after his defeat at the hands of the Rangers. However, a defective warbot manages to escape using a stolen ship. After the ship crashes on Veldin, Ratchet rescues the defective bot, who explains that he needs to warn the Galactic Rangers of Drek's plans. Ratchet names him "Clank" and offers to take him to the Ranger Headquarters on planet Kerwan. Traveling to Kerwan, they discover that Drek and his Blarg soldiers have already invaded the planet. The duo successfully foil an attempt by the invaders to destroy the Hall of Heroes by ramming it with a train loaded with explosives. As a reward for their assistance, Qwark reluctantly allows them to join the Rangers. As new Rangers, the duo lead many successful operations against the Blarg, but the insecure Qwark soon becomes jealous of Ratchet, whose popularity starts to overshadow his own fame.

Qwark calls a meeting of the Rangers to organize a direct assault on Quartu. The assault is successful, and the Rangers learn from Drek's files that the Blarg's true plan is to use the Deplanetizer, a weaponized space station created by Nefarious, to destroy several planets so that he can harvest their remains and build a new home world for his people. Learning that the next target is Novalis, Qwark leaves to personally negotiate with Drek while the other Rangers battle his forces outside the station. During the fighting, Ratchet enters the Deplanetizer and tries to shut it down, but Drek captures him. While being dragged away, Ratchet discovers that Qwark has been secretly feeding information to Drek and that he and Nefarious anticipated the attack. Drek then seals Ratchet in an escape pod and ejects him into space as the Rangers witness the destruction of Novalis.

For several weeks, the Rangers, demoralized by Qwark's betrayal, refuse to move against Drek. Ridden with guilt, Ratchet returns to Veldin and decides to quit. Clank urges him to reconsider, having identified Drek's final target: planet Umbris. Clank reveals that Umbris' destruction will destroy countless other worlds due to a rare orbital convergence; Ratchet deduces that Nefarious planned this from the beginning. Angered by his defeat at the hands of the Rangers, Nefarious has been manipulating Drek, intending to wipe out the entire galaxy. With his confidence restored, Ratchet rejoins the Rangers and heads to planet Kalebo III, where he obtains a Holo-Guise after winning a race championship. Using the Holo-Guise, Ratchet impersonates Qwark and infiltrates the Deplanetizer. He and Clank plan to remove the gravity stabilizer used to hold the Deplanetizer over its target, so that the Rangers can use high-powered magnets to drag it away from Umbris and prevent the planet's destruction.

An increasingly disillusioned Qwark confronts Drek for breaking his promise to spare the Rangers. Nefarious arrives and mocks Qwark for his treason before sending him away, and betrays Drek by turning him into a sheep and ejecting him into space. Meanwhile, Ratchet successfully removes the gravity stabilizer and defeats Qwark in a one-on-one battle. Realizing the error of his ways, Qwark names Ratchet as the new commander of the Rangers. Before they can arrest Nefarious, the doctor shoots at them and attempts to fire the Deplanetizer. The Rangers deploy the magnets and drag the Deplanetizer sideways, causing him to miss. Enraged, Nefarious, now piloting his personal battle mech, flies to a nearby dwarf star with the intention of triggering a supernova that will end all life in the galaxy. Ratchet destroys the mech and knocks it into the star, resulting in Nefarious' death. With the Deplanetizer disintegrating from the heat of Umbris' atmosphere, Ratchet, Clank, and Qwark use a teleporter to escape just in time.

In the present, Qwark and Helix are picking trash near the Hall of Heroes. Qwark, looking at a statue of himself, is greeted by Ratchet and Clank. Seizing the opportunity, Helix steals a gun, destroys several patrol bots, hijacks Ratchet's ship, and escapes. As the duo prepare to go after him, Ratchet asks Qwark if he would like to come along, which he gladly accepts.

== Development ==
Ratchet & Clank was announced during Sony's press conference at E3 2014. Insomniac Games' California and North Carolina studios cooperated on its development. Several developers from the first game, such as long-time design director Brian Allgeier, returned for the remake. The game was originally slated for release in 2015 but was delayed into 2016 to tie-in with the film's release. On January 11, 2016, it was confirmed that the game would release in Europe in April 2016.

The game was in parallel development with the film and shared the same character models, environments, animation and some writing. For example, Insomniac would send Rainmaker a 3D character model or environment, and Rainmaker would send Insomniac its slightly altered version for use in the game, so there would be parity between the pieces. Most of the assets in the film and video game had been touched between the two parties, and in some cases, Insomniac would try to match a movie scene as closely as possible in-game. The film and game used the same color-correction tools.

Unlike the original Ratchet & Clank, the remake runs at a frame rate of 30 frames per second. On March 31, 2021, the game was updated to run at 60 frames per second when played on PlayStation 5 through backwards compatibility. Players who pre-ordered the game received access to an additional weapon, the Bouncer, which was featured in Going Commando and Up Your Arsenal. On April 15, 2024, the game received an update that made the Bouncer available for all players, as part of the game's 8th anniversary.

== Reception ==
Reception

Aggregate score
Aggregator	Score
Metacritic	85/100

Review scores
Publication	Score
Destructoid	8/10
Electronic Gaming Monthly	8.5/10
Game Informer	8.25/10
GameRevolution	4.5/5
GameSpot	8/10
GamesRadar+	4/5
IGN	9/10
Polygon	8/10
VideoGamer.com	8/10
The Guardian	4/5

According to the review aggregation website Metacritic, Ratchet & Clank received "generally favorable reviews".

Chris Carter of Destructoid praised the characters, pacing, and varied gameplay, saying that he would welcome future Ratchet & Clank games after previously thinking that the series had run out of steam. Spencer Campbell of Electronic Gaming Monthly summarized his thoughts with: "Ratchet & Clank is a return to form for the series, but anyone looking for something more than that may be disappointed. The game tugs on many of the original's addictive strings, but is also bogged down by a few slower, more passive segments."

Game Informer's Andrew Reiner particularly commended the game's visuals, specifically praising the amount of action on the screen at once and the designs of the environments. Even though Reiner thought the soundtrack was "quite good", he did find some of the dialogue "cringe inducing". Reiner made positive comments about the gameplay, with his only criticism of it being that the sections not focusing on fast-paced action break up the flow of the game. Ultimately, Reiner said that he "couldn't put the game down".

Game Revolution's Jeb Haught gave the game a positive review, praising the "outstanding" visuals, "funny" storyline, "addictive" gameplay, and "intuitive" controls. Cassidee Moser of GameSpot cited the humor, gameplay variety, weapons and gadgets, controls, and graphics as positives but criticized the story for feeling "under-developed".

Lucas Sullivan from GamesRadar summarized his review with: "Despite some wonky tie-ins with the film, this is a gorgeous, thoroughly great platformer and a worthy reboot for Ratchet & Clank." IGN's Marty Sliva wrote: "Ratchet and Clank is a culmination of everything Insomniac has done with the series over the past 14 years." Sliva complimented the "absolutely gorgeous" visuals, "rewarding" upgrading systems, "charming" story, and "creative" weapons.

Philip Kollar for Polygon wrote: "I'd stop short of saying that the new Ratchet & Clank is exactly what every fan of the series wants. It's a bit less sprawling in terms of hard numbers — fewer planets, fewer weapons and so on — but the sheer variety and polish prevents this excellent reboot from being dragged down too far. There's enough here to make longtime fans happy, but perhaps more importantly for Insomniac and the franchise's future, it should win over plenty of new fans as well."

VideoGamer.com's Tom Orry summarized his review with: "Ratchet & Clank is an easy recommendation. It's great fun, looks lovely, plays well and almost serves as a palate cleanser to the usual video game releases. Newcomers to the series will likely find a fresher experience (even though it's a proper remake, familiarity does creep in), but fans will love what Insomniac has done here. A remake done right in a series that rarely puts a foot wrong."

During the 20th Annual D.I.C.E. Awards, the Academy of Interactive Arts & Sciences awarded Ratchet & Clank with "Family Game of the Year".

=== Sales ===
Ratchet & Clank became the best-selling retail game in the UK in its week of release. The sales of the remake in its release week tripled the release week sales of A Crack in Time, the previous record holder. The remake became the first game in the series to debut at No. 1 in the retail software sales chart, whilst being the best selling title on the PlayStation Store in Europe. On April 29, 2016, it was announced that Ratchet & Clank was the fastest selling title in the series. It was number 1 on the Australian charts during the week of release and became the second best selling game in the month of April in the U.S. at retail and on the PlayStation Store, making it the best launch of any game in the Ratchet & Clank series. NPD Group analyst Liam Callahan exclaimed that these sales recaptured success not seen for the franchise since the height of the PlayStation 2 era. In the December 2023 Insomniac Games data breach, it was revealed that the game sold 7 million units, becoming the best-selling title in the franchise.
