= The Glass House (2009 film) =

- Directed by: Hamid Rahmanian
- Screenplay by: Melissa Hibbard
- Produced by: Fictionville Studio Melissa Hibbard
- Starring: Samira Sussan Mitra Nazila Nooshin Marjaneh Halati
- Cinematography: Hamid Rahmanian
- Edited by: Hamid Rahmanian
- Music by: David Bergeaud
- Release date: June 20, 2009 (BAMcinemaFest)
- Running time: 92 minutes
- Country: Iran
- Language: Persian

The Glass House is a 2009 Iranian documentary film by Hamid Rahmanian (director and editor) and Melissa Hibbard (producer and script writer). The film is in Persian with English subtitles. The commercially released DVD also has French, German, Spanish, and Arabic subtitles.

The documentary follows four girls who are attempting to pull themselves out of the margins of society by attending rehabilitation center run by Omid Foundation in uptown Tehran.

== The Girls ==
Samira (14) is taken in by the program after she is found unconscious on the street by the local police. Her mother is in the "business of crystal meth, pills, hashish, [and] opium." She struggles to overcome forced drug addiction.

Mitra (16) lives with her emotionally abusive father and brother. She begins to deal with constant neglect in her creative writing.

Sussan (20) teeters on a dangerous ledge after years of sexual abuse by her brothers.

Nazila (19) works through anger through her music. While Iranian law does not permit female artists to record or perform their music, she is determined to find a way.

== Awards ==
The movie won the OSCE Human Rights Special Jury Award, the Best Feature Documentary award at Dallas Video Fest, and a Special Mention at the 2010 ZagrebDox.
