= Running Wild (video game) =

1998 racing video game

- Developer: Blue Shift
- Publishers: NA: 989 Studios; EU: Sony Computer Entertainment
- Composer: David Bergeaud
- Platform: PlayStation
- Release: NA: October 6, 1998; EU: 1998
- Genre: Racing
- Modes: Single-player, multiplayer

Running Wild is a racing video game developed by Blue Shift and published by Sony Computer Entertainment for the PlayStation. It was released in North America by 989 Studios. The game was produced by Universal Interactive Studios, who also produced Crash Bandicoot and Spyro for Sony. Activision currently owns the rights to the game.

== Gameplay ==
Each player takes on the role of a bipedal anthropomorphic animal, jumping over all sorts of obstacles in a foot race. Each of the game's six tracks is set in a vastly different locale, presenting unique challenges for every animal on the roster. Players choose from six characters, each with a different skill set. The elephant is the strongest, the bull is the most agile, and the zebra is the fastest. Hidden boss characters can be unlocked in the game's Challenge mode, while Time Trial allows players to race against their own best times.

== Characters ==
- Brazz the zebra
- Gwynne the rabbit
- Boris the elephant
- The General the bighorn sheep
- Coronado the bull
- Mei Ling the panda

=== Secret characters ===
- Blizzaro the snowman
- Pyro the firefighter
- Rex the tyrannosaurus rex
- Tox the toxic waste
- Kostra the desert skeleton
- Lunar the astronaut

== Development ==
A preliminary title for the game was "Freakin' Fast". Trademark issues were cited as the main reason behind the change. The game was produced by Universal Interactive Studios, who sold the publishing rights to Sony.

== Reception ==
Reception

Review score
Publication	Score
The Sydney Morning Herald	8.5/10

The UK Official PlayStation Magazine rated Running Wild a 5 out of 10.
