= Medieval Moves: Deadmund's Quest =

2011 video game

- Developers: San Diego Studio; Zindagi Games
- Publisher: Sony Computer Entertainment
- Composer: David Bergeaud
- Platform: PlayStation 3
- Release: NA: November 15, 2011; AU: November 17, 2011; EU: November 18, 2011
- Genre: Action adventure
- Mode: Single-player

Medieval Moves: Deadmund's Quest (Medieval Moves in Europe) is a 2011 action adventure video game developed by San Diego Studio and Zindagi Games and published by Sony Computer Entertainment for the PlayStation 3. It utilizes the PlayStation Move controller. It was officially announced at Electronic Entertainment Expo 2011 on June 5, 2011. The game is from the same team responsible for Sports Champions.

== Reception ==
Reception

Aggregate score
Aggregator	Score
Metacritic	61/100

Review scores
Publication	Score
Destructoid	6/10
Electronic Gaming Monthly	6/10
Eurogamer	5/10
Game Informer	6/10
GamePro	2.5/5
GameSpot	5/10
GameTrailers	6.7/10
IGN	8/10
PlayStation: The Official Magazine	6/10
Push Square	6/10
Common Sense Media	3/5
Metro	4/10

The game received "mixed" reviews according to the review aggregation website Metacritic.
