= List of Sony Pictures mobile games =

This is a partial list of video games published by Sony Pictures Digital Entertainment. This division is part of Sony's US mobile phone games division based in Culver City, CA. Sony is one of the global leaders in mobile entertainment licensing and publishing specializing in branded interactive games and personalization products available for download by consumers via their mobile device through a wireless provider distribution network.

== Mobile games ==
- Bewitched
- Bounce & Slam
- Casino Royale
- Charlie's Angels: Road Cyclone
- The Da Vinci Code: The Quest Begins
- The Da Vinci Code: Helix
- Elevator Action
- Ghostbusters
- God of War: Betrayal
- Jeopardy!
- NY Times Word Challenge
- Puzzle Poker
- Q*bert
- Ratchet & Clank: Going Mobile
- Ratchet & Clank: Clone Home (Never released)
- Strategy Sports: Soccer
- Snoop Dogg Boxing
- Spider-Man 2 Pinball
- Spider-Man 2 3D NY Rooftops
- Spider-Man 2 3D NY Subway
- Spider-Man 2: The Hero Returns
- Stuart Little 2: Air Adventure
- S.W.A.T. The Movie: 3D Game
- Wheel of Fortune
- xXx: The Next Level
- You Got Served Mobile

== See also ==
- List of Sony Ericsson products#International phones
