= Sony Pictures Digital =

Multimedia production company

Sony Pictures Digital Productions Inc.
- Type: Subsidiary
- Industry: Entertainment
- Founded: 1994; 32 years ago
- Headquarters: Culver City, California, United States
- Parent: Sony Group Corporation
- Website: sonypictures.net

Sony Pictures Digital Productions Inc. (previously known as Columbia TriStar Interactive, Sony Pictures Interactive Network, and Sony Pictures Digital Entertainment) is a subsidiary of Sony Group Corporation. Operating under the trade name Sony Pictures Digital Productions Inc., it is currently based in Japan, and was formerly based in Culver City, California, up until 2013. Bob Osher was the president of Sony Pictures Digital before he was fired in February 2015.

It oversees the digital production and online entertainment assets of Sony Pictures, consists of Sony Pictures Mobile, Sony Pictures Digital Networks, and others. It is known as the digital website interactive creator for SPE. Sony Pictures Digital designed websites for Sony Pictures, Screen Gems Network, SoapCity, Sony Pictures Imageworks, GSN, among others for SPE.

Columbia TriStar Interactive was formed in 1994. The first official website it launched was for Johnny Mnemonic in 1995. As well as building websites for films and TV shows, it also set up the Sony Studio Store in 1998 and went into partnership with 444-FILM selling movie tickets.

Logo used from 2005 to 2026

In 2005, the group's name was changed to Sony Pictures Digital Sales and Marketing and encompassed all areas of interactive media creation and marketing for SPE, including gaming, mobile, websites, design and sales.

The company was also a co-producer along with ShadowMachine, Seth Green's Stoopid Monkey production company, Williams Street, and Cartoon Network for the show, Robot Chicken until season 5, when Sony Pictures Television assumed the role.

Its former visual effects division Sony Pictures Imageworks provides visual effects for films produced not only by the divisions of the current parent Sony Pictures Motion Picture Group, but also by other non-SPE studios.

== See also ==
- List of Sony Pictures mobile games
