= Ratchet & Clank: Going Mobile =

Mobile action-platform game

- Title screen
- Developer: Handheld Games
- Publisher: Sony Pictures Mobile
- Director: Thomas Fessler
- Designer: Brad Wiggins
- Series: Ratchet & Clank
- Platform: Mobile phone (J2ME)
- Release: US: November 2, 2005
- Genres: Platform, shooter
- Mode: Single-player

Ratchet & Clank: Going Mobile is a platform shooter mobile game developed by Handheld Games and published by Sony Pictures Mobile. It is a spin-off of Sony Computer Entertainment's Ratchet & Clank series.

== Gameplay ==
An example of gameplay in Ratchet & Clank: Going Mobile

Players can collect titanium bolts, upgrade weapons, and defeat enemies. An upgrade meter for weapons is not displayed, however the HUD consists of (from left to right) an ammo meter, nanotech and bolt counter. Going Mobile allows for up to three save slots. The game is almost entirely devoid of sound except the main menu, and there are four different enemies. There is also an Arena where the duo can participate in 12 challenges.

== Plot ==
After some Bio Matter Converter technology is accidentally activated, Ratchet and Clank are transported inside a Secret Agent Clank vid-comic. Fighting off Megacorp security forces, including chickenbots, security bots, and security tanks, they manage to find a teleporter which takes them to the Communication Station, where transmissions can be sent out from the digital world and received from the analog one. They contact Big Al for help, and he tells them of the Macro Corporeal Geo Fragmentation Ion Negator (MCGuFIN), which could transport them back to the analog world. He says he possesses one (previously used as a door stop) and he will plug it into his copy of the Secret Agent Clank vid-comic for them to retrieve.

There is a problem, however, and the MCGuFIN is split into six pieces, each winding up inside a different vid-comic. After travelling between the vid-comics and retrieving them all, Ratchet and Clank return to Al, who informs them that they need the Infolink located in Maximillian's office. After bribing his bouncer they discover that Maximillian has already left. He has apparently used the Infolink to escape to the analog world, where he plans to wreak havoc. They go to confront him and he reveals that it was all a trap to try to take the MCGuFIN. They defeat him and his security cannon, activate the MCGuFIN by sliding down the appropriate Infolink, and prepare to transport themselves back to an unknown place in the analog world.

== Development and release ==
Ratchet & Clank: Going Mobile was developed by Handheld Games, published by Sony Pictures Mobile. It was released in exclusively United States on Java phones on November 2-14, 2005.

== Reception ==
Reception

Aggregate score
Aggregator	Score
GameRankings	76%

Review scores
Publication	Score
GameSpot	6.6/10
IGN	8.6/10
Pocket Gamer	4/5

Award
Publication	Award
Mobile Entertainment Awards	Best Action Game (2005)

Ratchet & Clank: Going Mobile was well received by the critics. In 2006, Ratchet & Clank: Going Mobile was awarded by Mobile Entertainment Awards for "Best Action Game".

IGN, who played the game on an LG VX8000 and a Nokia 6620, praised the graphics, the unique weapons, and the platforming, seeing the experience as reminiscent of gaming in the late 80s and mid-90s. They called Going Mobile an "excellent blueprint for how to make the jump" from a console game to a mobile game, concluding "Definitely download this one."

Pocket Gamer echoed this sentiment, saying that the source material from the main series survived the jump from 3D to 2D, just "on a much smaller scale," and remarking: "after about ten minutes, you actually forget that you're playing a 2D mobile game". They called the shooting and platforming gameplay "fairly typical" but praised the game design, graphics, controls, weapons, and amount of content, calling it "great value for your money".

GameSpot praised the game's visuals and "sharp gameplay", but criticized the repetition, stating: "The second half of the game has you revisiting previous stages." They additionally criticized the game's length of an "hour or two of gameplay" as well as its "fairly barren" sound design.

Retrospectively the writing of Jeuxvideo in 2012, was substantially harsher than contemporary reviewers, saying the game's "quality is nothing like current mobile productions, either in terms of production or gameplay" and calling it "too basic", "a game developed to exploit the vein of licensing" and "neither excellent nor totally failed." In 2021, Javier Reyes of Inverse described the game as "a low-end Game Boy Advance game, one that even the most diehard of Ratchet & Clank fans likely skipped out on".

== Cancelled sequel ==
A sequel Ratchet & Clank: Clone Home was announced in June 2006, but it was cancelled. It would have consistent 15 levels and offer more weapons than Going Mobile. An encrypted copy was found installed on a Sony Ericsson W880i in 2021. It was unencrypted in October 2025 and posted on archive.org for access by the general public.
