= Ratchet & Clank: Size Matters =

2007 video game

- North American PlayStation Portable box art
- Developer: High Impact Games
- Publisher: Sony Computer Entertainment
- Designers: David Goodrich; Lesley Mathieson
- Programmers: Jared Hardy; Jason Fourier; Justin Wilder
- Artists: Atsuko Kubota; Colin Raesler; Lloyd Murphy
- Writer: Oliver Wade
- Composer: David Bergeaud
- Series: Ratchet & Clank
- Platforms: PlayStation Portable, PlayStation 2
- Release: PlayStation Portable: NA: February 13, 2007; EU: May 11, 2007; AU: May 24, 2007; JP: June 28, 2007; PlayStation 2: NA: March 11, 2008; AU: March 27, 2008; EU: March 28, 2008; JP: July 3, 2008
- Genres: Platform, third-person shooter
- Modes: Single-player, multiplayer

Ratchet & Clank: Size Matters (Note: Known as Ratchet & Clank 5 in Japan) is a 2007 third-person shooter platform video game developed by High Impact Games and published by Sony Computer Entertainment for the PlayStation Portable. A spin-off of the Ratchet & Clank series, it is the first game in the series to be released for a handheld console. Developer High Impact Games consisted of former employees of series creator Insomniac Games. A port to the PlayStation 2 was released the following year.

The PSP version received generally positive reviews from critics, while the PS2 version received mixed reviews. The game sold 4.4 million units. The PSP version was re-released in July 2024 for the PlayStation 4 and PlayStation 5.

== Gameplay ==
As with Going Commando and the first game, space combat is present. However, this time, the player controls Giant Clank, rather than a ship. Also, there are arena battles, but this time, the player plays as Clank in a variety of vehicles. Clank returns as a playable character and is again able to control a set of Gadgebots, smaller robots which can perform certain tasks for him, although this only occurs in one section of the game. But the player may still play with Gadgebots in Clank Challenges. There are also various skyboard racing challenges that can be participated in to win bolts, gadgets, and new armor pieces.

Similar to previous games in the series, this game contains a variety of weapons which can be upgraded. For example, the Lacerator is upgraded to the Dual Lacerators. Mods can be purchased for most weapons from Slim Cognito vendors. Some weapons and gadgets from previous games appear, such as the Hypershot, Bolt Grabber and R.Y.N.O. Nanotech (health) can also be upgraded. The main way to beat enemies is with firepower, so bolts (which are used as currency) are an important criteria of the game. Although there is no way to access weapons, etc. from previous games, additional skins can be unlocked on Secret Agent Clank if the player has a Size Matters save.

There is also a new system for acquiring armor. Instead of buying armor from special vendors, as with games such as Going Commando, parts of armor are found in levels and can be combined to make different suits, each with their own unique advantage, as well as additional protection.

When the player completes the game, they can choose to enter "Challenge Mode". Challenge mode is a harder version of the game, with tougher enemies. To counter this, all weapons, armor, and bolts acquired so far are carried through. New sets of armor are available in Challenge Mode, and there is a bolt multiplier feature included. Weapons can also be upgraded further by purchasing "Titan" versions.

There are a total of 25 Skill Points in the game, which are gained by performing certain tasks, the only clue to which is the name of the particular Skill Point. These will unlock cheats in the game. There are 20 Titanium Bolts to be found which can be used to buy skins for Ratchet.

== Plot ==
While on a vacation on Pokitaru, Ratchet and Clank meet a little girl named Luna who is writing a school report on heroes. Shortly after they meet her, Luna is kidnapped by mysterious robots. Clank then stumbles upon a mysterious artifact from an ancient race, the Technomites. Although Ratchet is initially skeptical about their existence, Clank believes they do exist. Ratchet and Clank set out to save Luna and in the process, encounter Captain Qwark, who is attempting to find his biological parents. Ratchet allows him to use his ship's computer to aid in his search, in order to make him stop following them.

On Kalidon, Ratchet is kidnapped by Luna, who faked her kidnapping, and Clank is left in a junkyard on Metalis, however, Clank transforms into his Ultra-Mech form and sets off to destroy enemy troops and to save Ratchet. Meanwhile, Ratchet's DNA was taken in order to produce an army of clones. Emperor Otto Destruct, leader of the Technomites, has recognized Ratchet's potential and hopes to use his DNA to produce the ultimate soldier. Finding out that Luna is actually a robotic puppet and ship, the duo track it down to Dayni Moon, where Luna reveals the clone plot to Ratchet and Clank and explains the Technomites are bitter for never receiving credit from the general population for their technological advances.

After destroying the Luna puppet, Clank tries to get the clone factory co-ordinates from it, but is infected with a computer virus and malfunctions, allowing the Technomite soldiers inside the puppet to enter Clank. Ratchet uses his shrink ray to go inside Clank, meeting his internal security system, and they collaborate to eliminate the intruders and restart Clank's processor. Clank reveals that he did obtain the factory co-ordinates before being deactivated, and they head to a planet known as Quodrona. After Ratchet kills dozens of clones, Otto reveals that what Luna told them was a "cheesy story", and his real plan is to steal the intelligence of every being in the galaxy, using a special machine that transfers the intelligences from one being to another.

Qwark, persuaded by Otto, thinks Otto is his father and temporarily fights on his side. Ratchet and Clank eventually beat Otto, afterwards, they learn from Skrunch that Qwark's real parents had been killed by defective Technomite equipment. A vengeful Qwark tries to use Otto's machine to give Otto the intelligence of himself, but Skrunch interferes and causes Otto to gain his intelligence instead. Back in Ratchet and Clank's apartment, the shrunken Ratchet clones are sold as toys, and the two keep the shrunken Qwark company while watching an advertisement commercial for the new toy line.

== Development and release ==
High Impact Games, which comprised former Insomniac Games employees, developed Ratchet & Clank: Size Matters as their first title. The game was revealed at the E3 2006 pre-show. Size Matters took about 18 months to develop from scratch.

Ratchet & Clank: Size Matters was released for the PSP on February 13, 2007. In fall 2008, Sony began packing it in with PSP hardware bundles.

In March 2008, the game was ported to the PlayStation 2 due to high fan demand. This port removes the online multiplayer, but enhances the graphics and controls.

On July 16, 2024, the PSP version was re-released for PlayStation 4 and 5 via PlayStation Plus. It is an emulated version that allows for enhanced graphics, save states, rewinding, custom controls and trophies.

== Reception ==
Reception

Aggregate score
Aggregator	Score
Metacritic	(PSP) 85/100 (PS2) 62/100

Review scores
Publication	Score
Eurogamer	(PSP) 8/10 (PS2) 5/10
GameRevolution	(PS2) 6/10
GameSpot	(PSP) 8.2/10 (PS2) 6/10
GameSpy	(PSP) 4.5/5 (PS2) 3/5
GamesRadar+	(PSP) 4/5 (PS2) 3/5
GameZone	(PSP) 9/10 (PS2) 6/10
IGN	(PSP) 9/10 (PS2) 6/10
Pocket Gamer	(PSP) 4/5
VideoGamer.com	(PS2) 6/10

=== Critical reception ===
Ratchet & Clank: Size Matters received "generally favorable" reviews from critics for the PSP version, while the PS2 version received "mixed or average" reviews, according to review aggregator website Metacritic.

Game Informer rated 9/10 and awarded it the "Handheld of the Month" for April 2007. IGN gave it 9.0/10. During the 11th Annual Interactive Achievement Awards, the Academy of Interactive Arts & Sciences nominated Size Matters for "Handheld Game of the Year".

IGN gave the PS2 version a score of 6/10, citing its poor graphics, dull gameplay, and technical issues.

=== Sales ===
Size Matters was one of the best-selling PSP games of 2007. Its PSP hardware bundle has sold over one million units. Overall, the game is one of the best-selling PSP games, with 4.4 million sold.
