= Ratchet & Clank: All 4 One =

2011 video game

- North American box art
- Developer: Insomniac Games
- Publisher: Sony Computer Entertainment
- Directors: Shaun McCabe; Chad Dezern
- Composer: Michael Bross
- Series: Ratchet & Clank
- Platform: PlayStation 3
- Release: NA: October 18, 2011; AU: October 20, 2011; EU: October 21, 2011
- Genres: Platform, action-adventure
- Modes: Single-player, multiplayer

Ratchet & Clank: All 4 One is a 2011 action-adventure platform video game developed by Insomniac Games and published by Sony Computer Entertainment for the PlayStation 3. It is the third spin-off of the Ratchet & Clank series.

Upon release, the game received mixed reviews, with praise aimed at the soundtrack, story, graphics, humor, voice acting, combat and gameplay, though criticism was aimed at the frustrating partner AI and glitches. It was a commercial success, selling 1.5 million copies worldwide.

== Gameplay ==
Ratchet, Clank, Qwark and Doctor Nefarious fighting together against a swarm of robots

Unlike previous games in the series which were mostly single-player-only games, All 4 One focuses on a four-player cooperative multiplayer mode which allows for drop-in and drop-out online as well as offline multiplayer. Players can each take the role of one of the four main characters of the game, namely Ratchet, Clank, Qwark and Doctor Nefarious.

== Plot ==
The game begins when Galactic President Captain Qwark goes to the city of Luminopolis to receive an "Intergalactic Tool of Justice Award", and he asks Ratchet and Clank to escort him. When the ceremony begins, Dr. Nefarious (having been teleported off his space station right before it exploded in the previous game) arrives and awakens a light-eating Z'Grute from cryosleep, but it immediately turns against him, forcing Dr. Nefarious to join Ratchet, Clank and Qwark to stop it. While the team tracks the Z'Grute, strange unidentified robots follow the Z'Grute that don't seem to belong to Nefarious. After the team defeats the Z'Grute, a massive moon-sized drone appears and captures both the Z'Grute and the four heroes. They then awake in a mysterious facility but are rescued by Susie, a young galactic scout. When the team escapes and arrives at a Tharpod village, they find out that the drone that captured them is known as Ephemeris, the Creature Collector. It takes the universe's most dangerous beasts and brings them to planet Magnus. The team agrees to get rid of Ephemeris and heads through the Deadgrove to the N.E.S.T. (Northern Extraterrestrial Sorting Terminal). After fighting a Wigwump, the team finds the fifth holo-diary of Dr. Frumpus Croid. It shows that whoever is now in control of Ephemeris has plans for the monsters.

After fighting Commander Spog at the N.E.S.T, they find out that only the Architect knows how to defeat Ephemeris and head over to Terawatt Forest, beyond Octonok Cay. They also find Dr. Croid's first holo-diary. It shows the happier times on Magnus. While in Octonok Cay, they find Dr. Croid's next two holo-diaries. They show that Dr. Nevo Binkelmiyer, Dr. Croid's colleague betrayed him, ravaged his laboratory, took Mr. Dinkles, Dr. Croid's companion and stole the plans to a protomorphic energy extractor and that Dr. Croid sent a smaller version of Ephemeris to rescue his companion, Mr. Dinkles. When they reach Dr. Croid's research station, they find Dr. Croid's fourth holo-diary. It shows that Nevo seized control of Ephemeris and modified it into what it is now, and that Nevo is responsible for everything Ephemeris has done. When the team reaches the Hall of Paradoxology in Terawatt Forest, they find that Dr. Croid has moved his laboratory to the Phonica Moon, having expected Nevo to make an assassination attempt on him. When the team reaches Phonica Moon, they realize that Dr. Croid has seemingly gone insane. After accessing the lab's computers, Nefarious discovers that Ephemeris has a charging dock that recharges its power cells, the dock being stationed on the Vilerog Plateau just outside Uzo City. The team takes Dr. Croid's escape pod to the Vilerog Plateau, but on the way, Ephemeris attacks them and they crash land into the Polar Sea, unable to contact Cronk and Zephyr. When they discover a railway station, they find that it is broken. Qwark fakes dying, attempting to make amends with Nefarious. Just then, the Plumber appears and fixes the railway platform so the heroes can travel to Uzo City.

When the team reaches the core of Ephemeris, they discover that Nevo is not actually in charge of Ephemeris, having been betrayed by Mr. Dinkles, who is possessed by a Toranux Spirit known as the Loki Master. He reveals that Nevo did not betray Dr. Croid. Mr. Dinkles had done the things Dr. Croid thought Nevo had done. Although Nevo tried to stop Mr. Dinkles, Mr. Dinkles captured Nevo and made him his "pet". He will also use the collected beasts as vessels for the Toranux Spirits so they can destroy the universe. After fighting the heroes, he extracts his spirit into a Rykan V Grivelnox. After a long and fierce final battle, Dr. Croid and Nevo manage to extract the Master, which is promptly destroyed by Nefarious. Soon afterwards, Cronk and Zephyr arrive, revealing that they finally received help from Lawrence. Nefarious and Lawrence steal Cronk and Zephyr's ship and leave the heroes stranded on Magnus. Thankfully, Ratchet remembers that Ephemeris is still active, and everyone decides to use it so they can return to Luminopolis.

After the credits, Lawrence tells Nefarious of a secret route they can take past the barriers set by the Polaris Defense Force. During this, Nefarious is saddened while looking at the picture he had taken with Ratchet, Clank, and Qwark.

== Development and release ==
The game was announced at Sony's Gamescom 2010 press conference by Ted Price of Insomniac Games. The game was first rumored on August 6, 2010 when the voice actor for Clank, David Kaye, revealed that he had been hired by Insomniac Games to do more voice acting for Ratchet & Clank. The game's working title was Ratchet & Clank: 4 Play; when this name was rejected for its sexual reference, the subtitle was changed to Multiple Organisms, which was also rejected for its obvious innuendo.

A limited online beta was launched on September 14, 2011, until September 27. It allows for up to four players to go online and play through two sections of the game: the opening level of Luminopolis, where the players fight a creature called the Z'Grute, and the Vertigus Cliffs, where players are allowed access to a number of weapons, including new weapons like the Frost Cannon, Plasma Bomb Launcher and Warmonger, along with older weapons like the Combuster, among others.

The game was released on October 18, 2011, in North America and October 20–21 in Europe and Australia. The game was originally rated "7+" in Europe by PEGI, but was re-rated as "12+" when it was released as a Platinum game in response to a consumer complaint regarding the spoken phrase "whoop-ass".

== Reception ==
Reception

Aggregate score
Aggregator	Score
Metacritic	70/100

Review scores
Publication	Score
Destructoid	4/10
Electronic Gaming Monthly	4/5
Eurogamer	5/10
Game Informer	8.75/10
GameSpot	7/10
GamesRadar+	3.5/5
Giant Bomb	3/5
IGN	8/10
Push Square	8/10
VideoGamer.com	7/10

All 4 One received polarized reviews, with a Metacritic score of 70/100 indicating "mixed or average reviews". IGN gave the game an 8/10 citing as a step backwards from A Crack in Time. The most negative review has come from Destructoid who gave the game 4/10 and said "Ratchet & Clank: All 4 One should have been about $15, five hours shorter, and released on the PlayStation Network. It's a game that does a disservice to the high pedigree of the Ratchet & Clank series and takes too far a departure from what made such an excellent series". GameSpot gave the game a 7 out of 10. Game Informer gave it an 8.75 out 10, saying "This Is One For All The Fans Of Co-op Platforming." Morgan Webb of X-Play gave the game a 3 out of 5, praising the variety, story, and saying it will keep fans satisfied for the next game, but criticizing the glitches, easy puzzles, and more kid-friendly tone.
