= Sony Pictures Mobile =

American mobile entertainment company

Sony Pictures Mobile is an American mobile entertainment licenser and publisher specialising in branded mobile video games and personalisation products, which are available for download via mobile devices through Sony Pictures Mobile's distribution relationships with wireless providers and networks worldwide.

Sony Pictures Mobile is a division of Sony Pictures Digital, a Sony Pictures Entertainment company. Sony Pictures Entertainment is part of Sony Entertainment Inc. a Sony company.

== Games ==
- List of Sony Pictures mobile games
