= High Impact Games =

American video game developer

- Type: Private
- Industry: Video games
- Founded: 2004
- Defunct: November 2012; 13 years ago
- Fate: Dormant
- Headquarters: Burbank, California, USA
- Website: www.highimpactgames.com

High Impact Games was an American video game developer based in Burbank, California, formed in 2004 by former Insomniac Games members. In 2007, the company released Ratchet & Clank: Size Matters for the PlayStation Portable, with a PlayStation 2 port released the next year, and Secret Agent Clank in 2008, also for the PlayStation Portable. On November 3, 2009, the company released its third game, Jak and Daxter: The Lost Frontier, for the PlayStation Portable and PlayStation 2. The game was based on the Jak & Daxter series made by Naughty Dog. In 2010, High Impact Games was developing a remake of Crash Team Racing for PlayStation 3, Xbox 360 and Wii, but the publisher Activision canceled the game before the initial prototype was made. In 2011, an environmental artist who had worked on some games, revealed that High Impact Games was working on a new project for the Wii. This game was revealed to be Phineas and Ferb: Across the 2nd Dimension.

== Games ==
Release date	Game title	Platform	Metacritic rating
February 13, 2007	Ratchet & Clank: Size Matters	PlayStation Portable	85/100
March 11, 2008	Ratchet & Clank: Size Matters	PlayStation 2	62/100
June 17, 2008	Secret Agent Clank	PlayStation Portable	72/100
May 26, 2009	Secret Agent Clank	PlayStation 2 (developed by Sanzaru Games)	61/100
November 3, 2009	Jak and Daxter: The Lost Frontier	PlayStation Portable	71/100
November 3, 2009	Jak and Daxter: The Lost Frontier	PlayStation 2	72/100
August 2, 2011	Phineas and Ferb: Across the 2nd Dimension	PlayStation Portable	N/A
August 2, 2011	Phineas and Ferb: Across the 2nd Dimension	PlayStation 3	64/100
August 2, 2011	Phineas and Ferb: Across the 2nd Dimension	DS	47/100
August 2, 2011	Phineas and Ferb: Across the 2nd Dimension	Wii	76/100
November 8, 2011	Call of Duty: Modern Warfare 3	Wii (Assistance)	70/100
November 15, 2011	DreamWorks Super Star Kartz	3DS	N/A
November 15, 2011	DreamWorks Super Star Kartz	DS	N/A
November 15, 2011	DreamWorks Super Star Kartz	PlayStation 3	N/A
November 15, 2011	DreamWorks Super Star Kartz	Wii	N/A
November 15, 2011	DreamWorks Super Star Kartz	Xbox 360	N/A
January 13, 2012	Super Ninja	iOS	N/A
January 13, 2012	GOGO Fishing	iOS	N/A
September 18, 2012	Disney Princess: My Fairytale Adventure	3DS	N/A
September 18, 2012	Disney Princess: My Fairytale Adventure	MacOS	N/A
September 18, 2012	Disney Princess: My Fairytale Adventure	Microsoft Windows	N/A
September 18, 2012	Disney Princess: My Fairytale Adventure	Wii	N/A
Cancelled	The Oddities	PlayStation 3	N/A
Cancelled	The Oddities	Xbox 360	N/A
