= Ratchet & Clank Future: Quest for Booty =

2008 video game

- European PlayStation 3 cover art
- Developer: Insomniac Games
- Publisher: Sony Computer Entertainment
- Composer: David Bergeaud
- Series: Ratchet & Clank
- Platform: PlayStation 3
- Release: NA/EU: August 21, 2008; AU: August 22, 2008
- Genres: Third-person shooter, platform
- Mode: Single-player

Ratchet & Clank Future: Quest for Booty (known as Ratchet & Clank: Quest for Booty in Europe and Australia) is a 2008 third-person shooter platform video game developed by Insomniac Games and published by Sony Computer Entertainment for the PlayStation 3 through PlayStation Network. It is the sixth main installment in the Ratchet & Clank series and the second installment of its Future saga, acting as a direct sequel to Tools of Destruction, and follows Ratchet's quest to save Clank, who has been taken by the Zoni.

== Gameplay ==
Ratchet uses a "Helio-Grub" in the new light/dark gameplay.

Gameplay was first shown at E3 2008. This game features more puzzle solving and platforming than previous games in the series and introduces new features, such as the ability to pick things up with the Omniwrench Millennium 12. There are also sections where Ratchet must pick up creatures called Heliogrubs in order to light up a dark area. The Omniwrench Millennium 12 also has a tether ability, which can be used to manipulate objects and move obstacles. The Combuster, Fusion Grenade, Nano Swarmers, Predator Launcher, Tornado Launcher, Shock Ravager and Alpha Disrupter make their return from Tools of Destruction.

== Plot ==
A year after defeating Emperor Tachyon and witnessing the Zoni abduction of Clank at the end of Tools of Destruction, Ratchet and his partner Talwyn Apogee learn from the IRIS Supercomputer that Captain Angstrom Darkwater, a legendary space pirate, is the only individual with knowledge of how to contact the Zoni. Traveling to his home planet of Merdegraw in the Drogol Sector, the duo slip aboard a pirate fleet above the Azorean Sea, but are soon discovered and captured by Sprocket, Darkwater's first mate, who reveals that Darkwater has been dead for years. Seconds before the two are to be executed, Rusty Pete shows up disguised as Captain Romulus Slag (who Ratchet defeated in Tools of Destruction) and instead orders them to be marooned on Hoolefar Island.

After experiencing a brief vision of Clank surrounded by glowing energy, Ratchet reunites with Talwyn and meets the local leader, Mayor Barnabas Worley. He dispatches Ratchet to restore the island's power supply by restarting several wind turbines and then directs him to the town's radio operator, who asks Ratchet to purchase a Versabolt from the Smuggler so he can make badly needed repairs. As a reward for providing assistance, Worley reveals the existence of the Obsidian Eye, a powerful lorentzian telescope Darkwater built to maintain a link to the Zoni's home dimension. Unfortunately, the Eye's power source, an artifact known as the Fulcrum Star, was hidden by Darkwater shortly before he was killed in a mutiny organized by Slag.

Rusty Pete arrives and, with the help of Slag's still-functioning head, guides Ratchet and Talwyn to Darkwater's tomb in Morrow Caverns. After Talwyn is separated from the group by a cave-in, Ratchet and Pete travel on and reach Darkwater's ship. Pete then connects Slag's head to Darkwater's body, revealing that his only loyalty is to his former captain. Resurrected, Slag, sharing his new body with the vengeful spirit of Darkwater, takes control of Darkwater's ghost crew and fleet, and sets out to pillage Hoolefar Island. After a pitched battle on the beach, the pirates are defeated and retreat.

With the Smuggler's help, Ratchet locates Darkwater Cove, where the Star is said to be hidden. After passing a series of tests set up by Darkwater, Ratchet accesses the treasure vault, only to fall into a cavern. The pirates arrive, confiscate the Star, and take Talwyn captive, leaving Sprocket to keep Ratchet from following them. Upon defeating him, Ratchet and the Smuggler pursue the enemy fleet.

Rescuing Talwyn, Ratchet confronts Slag and Darkwater, defeating them in a series of battles and eventually knocking them into the water. Pete goes to rescue them, allowing Ratchet to claim the Star. Returning to the island, Ratchet activates the Obsidian Eye and learns that Clank has been damaged by overexposure to Zoni energy, losing his memories in the process. The Zoni reveal that they have found a doctor to fix him - specifically Doctor Nefarious. Recognizing his old enemy, Ratchet and Talwyn set off to save Clank, as Pete and Slag are revealed to be stranded adrift in the middle of the ocean.

== Release ==
Quest for Booty was released exclusively for the PlayStation 3 via PlayStation Network in North America and Europe on August 21, 2008, and in Australia and Japan on August 22. It was also physically released on Blu-ray Disc in Europe with the exception of the United Kingdom on September 12, 2008, and in Asia on September 25, 2008. Due to its shorter length, it was released at a low price point in comparison to standard retail games.

The game was announced as one of the free games distributed by Sony as part of their 'Welcome Back' package in Europe and Australia as a result of the 2011 PlayStation Network outage, which left users unable to connect to PlayStation servers for over 3 weeks.

== Reception ==
Reception

Aggregate score
| Aggregator | Score |
|---|---|
| Metacritic | 76/100 |

Review scores
| Publication | Score |
|---|---|
| 1Up.com | B |
| Eurogamer | 7.0/10 |
| GameSpot | 7.5/10 |
| IGN | 7.4/10 |

Quest for Booty received "generally positive reviews" from critics, according to review aggregator website Metacritic.

1UP's Nick Suttner described the game as "a rollicking few hours, polished to a sheen and even better-paced than its full-length predecessors, although Booty tromps off with its own side story, ending on the same cliffhanger with little more resolved." Suttner also expressed that the game looks slightly better than Tools of Destruction due to improved lighting and better textures.

IGN reviewer Jeremy Dunham says "Quest for Booty has been designed as a quick four-hour experience and it feels shortchanged because of it. Though its shooting and platforming sequences are fun and of high production, it still seems like there's something missing," but said that "there are some really cool puzzles and new gameplay elements."

== Sequel ==
A sequel subtitled A Crack in Time was revealed in March 2009, and was released for the PlayStation 3 in North America on October 27, 2009, Europe on November 4, 2009, Australia on November 5, 2009, and in the United Kingdom on November 6, 2009.
