= Ratchet & Clank Future: A Crack in Time =

2009 video game

- North American cover art
- Developer: Insomniac Games
- Publisher: Sony Computer Entertainment
- Director: Brian Allgeier
- Writers: T.J Fixman; Brian Hastings
- Composer: Boris Salchow
- Series: Ratchet & Clank
- Platform: PlayStation 3
- Release: NA: October 27, 2009; AU: November 5, 2009; EU: November 6, 2009
- Genres: Third-person shooter, platform
- Mode: Single-player

Ratchet & Clank Future: A Crack in Time (known as Ratchet & Clank: A Crack in Time in most PAL countries and Ratchet & Clank Future 2 in Japan) is a 2009 third-person shooter platform video game developed by Insomniac Games and published by Sony Computer Entertainment for the PlayStation 3. It is the seventh main installment in the Ratchet & Clank series and the third in its Future saga.

Upon release, the game received critical acclaim, with praise particularly aimed at the story, visuals, and gameplay. The fourth and final installment of the Future saga, Ratchet & Clank: Into the Nexus, was released in November 2013.

== Gameplay ==
A Crack in Time game features both returning and new gameplay mechanics to the Ratchet & Clank series. One such mechanic involves the Chronosceptor: A staff that repairs broken objects. This device can be used like Ratchet's wrench, to fight off enemies. By using special "time pads", Clank can record up to a minute of his actions and then a holographic Clank replays them, while the real Clank does something else. Up to four copies of Clank can be recorded at a time. These holographic Clanks can help to solve puzzles. In addition to gadgets like the Swingshot and Gravity Boots from previous games, Ratchet has a pair of hoverboots, allowing him to move more quickly around planets and moons.

In a departure from all previous games in the series, Ratchet can fly his ship freely between planets on a two-dimensional ecliptic in various zones, going to small moons and completing optional challenges, earning special items such as Zoni, gold bolts, and weapon mods in the process. The ship's blasters, missiles, and armor can be upgraded by obtaining additional Zoni. The game also has new weapons known as Constructo Weapons. These fall into three main categories; shotgun, bomb, and pistol. Each weapon can be modified with additional features and altered in appearance to make a weapon unique to the player.

== Plot ==
Following the events of Quest for Booty, Dr. Nefarious has been assigned by the Zoni to repair Clank. In truth, the doctor is using the partnership as a front to find the key to a room called the "Orvus Chamber" from Clank's memories. When the Zoni deny him access, Nefarious betrays them and chases them away with his robotic forces, inadvertently allowing Clank to escape. He is eventually cornered by Nefarious, who reveals that he has been taken somewhere called the Great Clock, a Zoni construct designed to keep time and located in the center of the universe ("give or take fifty feet"), before being immobilized.

At the same time, Ratchet and Captain Qwark are struck by a mysterious anomaly and crash-land on the planet Quantos in their search for Clank. Lord Vorselon, Nefarious' personal assassin, launches an attack on the planet's Fongoid population in search of someone named Alister Azimuth, mistaking Ratchet for them. After both the Fongoids and Qwark are captured, Ratchet repairs his ship with help from the Zoni and journeys to Vorselon's warship to rescue the hostages. Realizing that Azimuth could be a potential ally, he decides to track him down. Meanwhile, Clank is revived by Sigmund, the Junior Caretaker of the Great Clock. Sigmund helps Clank learn more about the Clock's function, to maintain temporal normality across the universe, and also asks for his help in repairing the temporal damage across multiple planets caused by Nefarious. Clank also meets Orvus, a Zoni and the Clock's designer, who converses with him as a digital program in his subconsciousness. He reveals that he is Clank's true creator and that he now leaves the Clock in his care.

On planet Torren IV, with some intel from Qwark, Ratchet tracks down Azimuth. He is revealed to be another Lombax left behind when the race fled Tachyon's vendetta and was a good friend of Ratchet's father, Kaden. Azimuth guesses that Clank has been taken to the Clock based on his own research and the two decide to team up to find another Obsidian Eye in the hopes of being able to talk to Clank. In the Clock itself, Clank learns after eavesdropping on Sigmund that the real Orvus disappeared two years ago after agreeing to meet with Dr. Nefarious. Whilst searching for the Eye on planet Lumos, Azimuth hesitantly explains that he was indirectly responsible for the near-extinction of the Lombaxes when he gave Tachyon their technology and was exiled for his crimes. Azimuth plans to change what happened by using the Clock to rewrite history, allowing Ratchet the chance to get his family back. Ratchet and Azimuth find the Eye and use it to communicate with Clank, who brings them up to speed about Orvus' plight and implores them to go to planet Zanifar to save his father.

On Zanifar, Ratchet uses a time portal created by Sigmund to travel back in time and attempt to rescue Orvus, who is being tortured by Nefarious for information on how to enter the Chamber, the central control room of the Clock. Orvus warns Nefarious that the Clock is not to be used as a time machine and disappears after the doctor tries to attack him. Shortly after returning to the present, Ratchet learns that Azimuth has been kidnapped by Vorselon, who forces Ratchet to come and save him. Although initially angry that Ratchet chose a rescue mission over finding the Clock, Azimuth relents upon learning of Ratchet's time travel, assuring that using the Clock is worth the risk. At the Clock, while testing out a piece of equipment, Clank encounters the Plumber in his subconscious, who cryptically tells him not to "risk any more than six minutes". He and Sigmund then open the door to the Orvus Chamber, but are immobilized by Lawrence, who had been following them through the Clock on Nefarious' orders. Ratchet and Azimuth intercept a faked distress call from Clank on planet Vapedia, where they defeat the local Valkyries and rescue him. After Clank repeats Orvus' warning of the damage to reality the Clock could cause if used incorrectly, Ratchet gives up on the idea of using it to save his family and the Lombaxes; an upset Azimuth leaves.

Ratchet and Clank meet with Qwark to infiltrate Nefarious' space station and destroy his armada so that he cannot reach the Clock. The plan fails when they are confronted by Nefarious himself, who explains his plan to change time to make a perfect universe where the heroes always lose, as retaliation for his defeat at the end of Up Your Arsenal. Nefarious launches Ratchet and Clank to the barren planet Morklon so that they don't interfere with his plans, but with help from Sigmund, they are able to use a time portal to secure a working ship that helps them return. Ratchet and Clank fight and seemingly kill Nefarious before narrowly escaping with the help of Azimuth as the doctor's malfunctioning ship destroys the station.

Regrouping at the Clock, Clank reveals that he intends to stay there to fulfill his father's wishes, to which Ratchet sadly agrees. However, Azimuth insists that they could still use the Clock to save the Lombaxes, which Ratchet again refuses. A furious Azimuth strikes and kills Ratchet before racing for the Orvus Chamber, where he is only just locked out by Clank. Though conflicted on what to do, Clank remembers the Plumber's advice and uses the Clock to reverse time just six minutes, saving Ratchet's life in the process. In this new timeline, Azimuth manages to reach the Chamber before Ratchet and Clank and initiates a time shift to save the Lombaxes. As the Clock begin to shatter around them, Ratchet injures Azimuth and inadvertently breaks the controls trying to stop the shift. Feeling remorse for risking existence itself to change the past, Azimuth manages to stop the Clock from completely breaking at the cost of his own life.

In the aftermath, Ratchet aids the Zoni in repairing the last of the damage and wishes Clank well as he leaves. However, realizing that Ratchet means more to him as family than his duties at the Clock, Clank changes his mind and promotes Sigmund to Senior Caretaker, reuniting with his friend before he departs. A message from Orvus plays, encouraging Clank to do what he feels will make him feel whole, even if that means leaving the Clock. In a post-credits scene, Qwark is stranded on the debris of Nefarious' station, desperately calling for help while his hungry pet War Grok tries to eat him.

== Marketing ==
The title and logo of the game, along with a trailer were revealed at the 2009 Game Developers Conference.

In March 2009, the PlayStation Blog later announced that a design contest for a weapon would be run until April 10, with the winning design being featured as a usable weapon in the game, as well as a real-life replica being made for the winner and a trip to Comic-Con for the weapon's unveiling to the public. The winning design was the "Spiral Of Death", a weapon that shoots glowing sawblades that after a certain range, return to the user, somewhat like a yo-yo.

In July 2009, Sony announced that players who pre-ordered the game from selected retailers in North America would be able to unlock one of four additional in-game content packs. It was confirmed however, that the package will simply unlock the items earlier in the game—the player can still earn these items while playing. A collector's edition of the game was released in the UK, featuring a 3D-cover, artwork book, and a voucher for use on the PlayStation Network which unlocks the Insomniac Moon, an ingame area which showcased content cut from the game.

A Ratchet & Clank-themed game space was released for PlayStation Home, the PlayStation 3's online community-based service. The "Ratchet & Clank: Time Travelers" space has several casual mini-games, like the Firing Range (past, present, and future) that have rewards like a model of Ratchet's ship for the users personal spaces. Users can also purchase a costume of Ratchet and a Clank back pack from the space's shop. In addition to the game space, there is a themed apartment, the "Ratchet & Clank: Home Sweet Home", that users can purchase. Both the game space and apartment were released on October 15, 2009 in the European and North American versions of Home. Both the Game Space and apartment were released to the Asian and Japanese version on November 19, 2009.

Ratchet & Clank-themed action figures were released in January 2010.

== Reception ==
Reception

Aggregate score
Aggregator	Score
Metacritic	87/100

Review scores
Publication	Score
Destructoid	9/10
Eurogamer	7/10
Famitsu	36/40
Game Informer	9.25/10
GameDaily	9/10
GamePro	4.5/5
GameRevolution	B+
GameSpot	8.5/10
GameSpy	4.5/5
GameTrailers	8.9/10
Giant Bomb	5/5
IGN	9/10
PlayStation: The Official Magazine	4.5/5
Push Square	9/10
411Mania	9.3/10
Teletext GameCentral	7/10

A Crack in Time received positive reviews from critics. IGN's Ryan Clements called it "One of the best Ratchet games ever made" and also noted that it plays like the other Ratchet installments and that players who are not yet tired of the series formula will enjoy it. Eurogamer criticized the game's lack of innovation and describing it as "more of the same". Reviewer Ellie Gibson did however praise the game as a "quality platformer" commenting specifically on its "superb combat system, decent puzzles, fun weapons, pretty visuals and [...] variation". GameTrailers said that "If A Crack in Time is indeed the final Ratchet & Clank game, then the series has been finished the right way".

GamePro reviewer Will Herring felt that the game's camera angles were problematic at times, a statement echoed by Joe Rybicki of GameSpy, but praised its new innovations, calling the hoverboots one of the game's "most enjoyable additions [to the series]". Rybicki found the game's weapon selection "lackluster", especially early in the game, while praising some of the time-based Clank levels. Dan Ryckert, of Game Informer, said that "the Clank sections are the best puzzles seen in the series to date". GameDaily's Robert Workman found that the game's audio was "superb". In Japan, Famitsu gave it a score of all four nines for a total of 36 out of 40.

Sam Kennedy of 1Up.com gave it an A, saying, "I'm a casual fan of the series and I still found myself excited to get home and play the game each night the past week. It may be a lot of more of the same, but more of the same has never been so darn addicting." GameZone gave the game nine out of ten, saying, "If you are looking for a game that is entertaining to the point of making you laugh out loud, of invoking a childlike sense of fun playing a game, then this is such a title." However, Edge gave it seven out of ten, saying, "The puzzles themselves can feel gimmicky and detached, as though inclusion was more important than integration."

A Crack in Time was nominated for the "Outstanding Achievement in Animation", "Outstanding Achievement in Visual Engineering", "Outstanding Achievement in Original Story", and "Adventure Game of the Year" awards at the Academy of Interactive Arts & Sciences' 13th Annual Interactive Achievement Awards, all of which went to Uncharted 2: Among Thieves.

== Sequel ==
On July 10, 2013, a fourth installment was announced. Into the Nexus was released exclusively for the PlayStation 3 on November 12, 2013. This is an epilogue to the Future sub-series.
