= Ratchet and Clank (characters) =

Video game characters

- Ratchet & Clank characters
- Ratchet and Clank as seen in Rift Apart
- First game: Ratchet & Clank (2002)
- Created by: Insomniac Games
- Designed by: David Guertin
- Voiced by: Ratchet: Mikey Kelley (2002), James Arnold Taylor (2003–present); Clank: David Kaye

In-universe information
- Aliases: XJ-0461 (designation; Clank); B5429671 (serial number; Clank)
- Race: Lombax (Ratchet); Robot (Clank)
- Home: Planet Fastoon (Ratchet); Planet Quartu (Clank)

Ratchet and Clank are the titular main protagonists of the Ratchet & Clank video game series developed by Insomniac Games, starting with the 2002 Ratchet & Clank. Ratchet is an anthropomorphic alien creature known as a Lombax, while Clank is an escaped robot (real name: XJ-0461 or Defect B5429671) who soon teams up with him. Ratchet was intended to be a mascot character for Sony to use to compete against Nintendo's Mario, Sega's Sonic the Hedgehog and Microsoft's Blinx, replacing Crash Bandicoot and Spyro in the sixth generation of video game consoles (GameCube, Dreamcast, Xbox and PlayStation 2).

== Concept and creation ==
Both Ratchet and Clank were conceived for inclusion in the original Ratchet & Clank. Ratchet was originally envisioned by Insomniac Games Vice President of Programming Brian Hastings as a space-traveling reptile alien who would collect various weapons as he progressed through the game; Ratchet's final form was decided upon after Insomniac looked at various terrestrial creatures, such as dogs, rats, and feline features stood out to them because of the sense of agility associated with it.

Clank spawned from an early idea involving a number of small robots attached to Ratchet, which would perform different functions. However, Insomniac realized that having the three robots was both complicated and created confusion about Ratchet's appearance, leading them to have only one robot, Clank. Ratchet tends to be headstrong and is usually not afraid to voice his opinion. In response to the negative critical reception of Ratchet's personality, Ratchet's personality was altered in Ratchet & Clank: Going Commando to be "less cocky, much more friendly to Clank, and... able to handle himself better in stressful situations without being impetuous."

In the English versions of the games, Ratchet is voiced by Mikey Kelley in the original Ratchet & Clank; James Arnold Taylor takes over starting with the second game. Meanwhile, Clank is voiced by David Kaye.

== Appearances ==
Ratchet and Clank first appear in Ratchet & Clank, the first game in the Ratchet & Clank series, made for the PlayStation 2, where they first meet while on separate missions, both looking for help from Captain Qwark to stop the goals of Chairman Drek. Their goals frequently conflict, with Clank calling Ratchet out for his selfishness and Ratchet ultimately apologizing due to Clank being the only way to pilot his ship. They appear in the sequel, Ratchet & Clank: Going Commando (2003), also made for the PlayStation 2, where they are living the lives of heroes and get a call from the CEO of Megacorp, wanting them to help retrieve a dangerous prototype which was stolen. In Ratchet & Clank: Up Your Arsenal (2004), Ratchet and Clank help Captain Qwark defeat his past nemesis, Dr. Nefarious. Meanwhile, Clank is shown to be a movie star, acting as "Secret Agent Clank". A great deal of new information regarding Clank's real origins is shown in the Future trilogy. They both appear in Ratchet & Clank Future: Tools of Destruction (2007), where Clank is often visited by mysterious beings known as the Zoni and is warned that he faces some difficult decisions regarding his adventures with Ratchet. Clank is eventually taken away by the Zoni at the end of the game. In Ratchet & Clank Future: A Crack in Time, Clank is transported to the Great Clock where he learns that his creator is, in fact, a powerful Zoni named Orvus (his alternate name is also quoted as XJ-0461) and fulfills his intended purpose as Senior Caretaker of the Clock. After the final battle, Clank is left with a hard decision on whether to continue partnering Ratchet or leave him and stay at the Clock, but he ultimately picks Ratchet.

Ratchet and Clank appear in various other games; Ratchet and Clank both appear in Hot Shots Golf Fore!, PlayStation Move Heroes, PlayStation All-Stars Battle Royale, Fall Guys, and the PlayStation 4 version of Super Bomberman R, They both cameo in Astro's Playroom. Ratchet appears by himself in Jak X: Combat Racing and Jak II.

== Reception ==
Ratchet and Clank have been generally well-received; Ratchet was voted as the sixteenth top character of the 2000s decade by Game Informer's readers, and readers of Guinness World Records Gamer's Edition voted Ratchet as the 15th-top video game character of all time. GamesRadar listed Clank on their list of "The 25 best new characters of the decade", describing him as a "quiet, collected and effortlessly charming robot with cool powers and cooler personality". On Mikey Kelley's vocal performance as Ratchet in Ratchet & Clank, Douglass C. Perry of IGN commented that "while Ratchet strives for that perfect dude-like teenager vibe, the voice actor generally hits the mark." He described David Kaye's performance as Clank as "quite engaging, and in some cases, charming, especially when he finishes a level or gains a weapon." Gavin Frankle of AllGame found it hard to form an emotional bond with Ratchet or Clank, saying that Ratchet is "your typical teenager [...] who desires nothing more than excitement and adventure", and that Clank is "the stereotypical intellectual; stuffy and almost prudish to a fault".

Ratchet's personality has received mixed response, with Benjamin Turner of GameSpy being highly critical of Ratchet in his review of the first game criticizing his design and demeanor, which he called "rude and immoral." He expressed a desire to see Clank as the protagonist instead. Johnny Liu of GameRevolution described Ratchet as having a "blue-collar attitude," appreciating that he's not a "typical goody-goody" though criticizing that he wasn't fleshed out. Ratchet's in-game model in Ratchet & Clank, particularly his facial animations and fur, was praised by Louis Bedigian of GameZone, noting that it is more realistic than the game's NPCs. Critics took note of Ratchet's improved character in subsequent games. Perry appreciated that he became "a little more forgiving and a lot more palatable," while Carlos McElfish of GameZone felt his new voice actor "forc[es] a psychological reset in the minds of players."
