= Robin Atkin Downes =

British actor

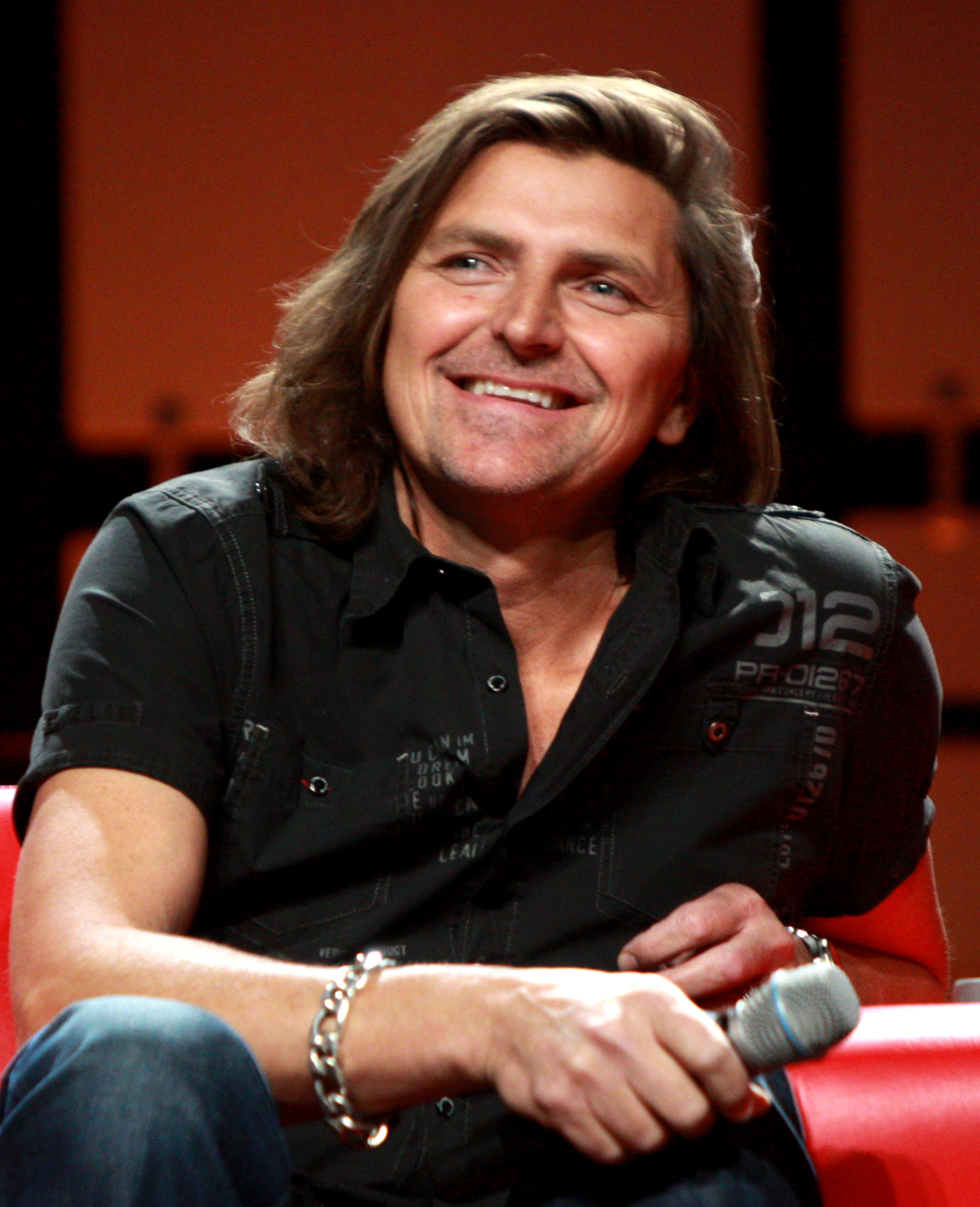
- Downes in 2013
- Occupation: Actor
- Years active: 1997–present

Robin Atkin Downes is a British actor. He is known for his work as a voice actor in video games and animation.

== Early life ==
Downes earned a Master of Fine Arts from Temple University in Philadelphia.

== Career ==
Downes has voiced characters in animated films such as Ack in How to Train Your Dragon, David in the English dub of Steamboy, and Manchester Black in Superman vs. The Elite. His live-action television roles include Pockla in Angel, Byron and Morann in Babylon 5, and Machida in Buffy the Vampire Slayer, while his voice work on television includes The Master on The Strain and various roles on Regular Show, Star Wars: The Clone Wars, The Avengers: Earth's Mightiest Heroes, and ThunderCats.

Downes' video game roles include various characters in Gears of War and Metal Gear, Travis Touchdown in No More Heroes, Captain Slag in Ratchet & Clank, a selectable voice for the male protagonist in multiple Saints Row games, the Medic in Team Fortress 2, Luxord in Kingdom Hearts, Spider in Destiny 2: Forsaken, the Prophet of Regret in Halo 2, Brynjolf in Skyrim, Robert in The Last of Us, Captain Conrad Roth in Tomb Raider, various characters across the Uncharted franchise, The Prince in Prince of Persia: Warrior Within, Ballistic in Apex Legends, James Grayson in Resistance: Retribution, and Cyclops and Pyro in X-Men Legends.

Downes maintains a personal YouTube channel, on which he uploads behind-the-scenes footage of his work over the years.

In July 2021, Downes voiced Cham Syndulla in Star Wars: The Bad Batch. He had previously voiced the character in Star Wars: The Clone Wars and Star Wars Rebels.

== Filmography ==
=== Voice acting ===
==== Feature films ====
Year	Title	Role	Notes	Reference
2005	Steamboy	David	English dub	Resume
2005	Garfield: A Tail of Two Kitties	Additional voices		Resume
2008	Meet the Spartans	Narrator	Uncredited	Resume
2008	Disaster Movie	Emergency Broadcaster		
2008	The Tale of Despereaux	The Cat	Uncredited	Resume
2009	Transformers: Revenge of the Fallen	Prime #3		
2010	How to Train Your Dragon	Ack		Resume
2012	Battleship	Soccer Announcers		
2012	Prometheus	Ship Computer Voices		Resume
2013	Hansel & Gretel: Witch Hunters	Edward		Resume
2013	Jack the Giant Slayer	ADR Loop Group		Resume
2014	Postman Pat: The Movie	Simon Cowbell		
2016	Batman v Superman: Dawn of Justice	Doomsday	Also motion capture	Resume
2016	The Conjuring 2	Demon Voice		
2016	Suicide Squad	Angelo		Resume
2018	Incredibles 2	Additional voices		
2019	How to Train Your Dragon: The Hidden World	Ack		
2019	Frozen II	Additional voices		
2023	Vindicta	David		
2025	Wake Up Dead Man	Additional voices		

==== Direct-to-video and television films ====
Year	Title	Role	Notes	Reference
1999	Babylon Park: Frightspace	Lillard, Steve, Byakhee	Short film	
2000	Babylon Park: Grudgematch	Gaiman	Short film Direct-to-video	
2004	Barbie as the Princess and the Pauper	Additional voices	Uncredited; Direct-to-video	Resume
2005	Geppetto's Secret	Philip Screwdriver		Resume
2008	Justice League: The New Frontier	The Guardian		
2011	All-Star Superman	Solaris		
2011	Batman: Year One	Harvey Dent		
2012	Justice League: Doom	Alfred Pennyworth		
2012	Superman vs. The Elite	Manchester Black		Resume
2013	Batman: The Dark Knight Returns, Part 2	Oliver Queen		
2013	Lego Marvel Super Heroes: Maximum Overload	Abomination		
2013	Iron Man & Hulk: Heroes United	Dr. Fump, Abomination		
2014	Iron Man & Captain America: Heroes United	Dr. Fump, Computer Voice 2		
2015	Batman vs. Robin	Grandmaster		
2016	Batman: Bad Blood	Mad Hatter / Jervis Tetch		
2016	Batman: The Killing Joke	Harvey Bullock		Resume
2017	Batman and Harley Quinn	Rhino		
2020	Mortal Kombat Legends: Scorpion's Revenge	Kano, Shinnok		
2021	Batman: Soul of the Dragon	Schlangenfaust		
2021	Batman: The Long Halloween	Scarecrow, Thomas Wayne		
2021	Mortal Kombat Legends: Battle of the Realms	Shinnok, Reiko		
2023	Justice League: Warworld	Mongul		
2023	Mortal Kombat Legends: Cage Match	Shinnok		
2024	The Thundermans Return	T-Force Assistant		

==== Television shows ====
Year	Title	Role	Notes	Reference
2014–2017	The Strain	The Master		Resume
2020	The Umbrella Academy	AJ Carmichael	2 episodes	
2024	The Acolyte	Captain Blex, Prisoner	Episode: "Lost / Found"	

==== Animation ====
Year	Title	Role	Notes	References
2002	ChalkZone	Additional Voices		Resume
2004	Evil Con Carne	Secret Service #1, Soldier	Episode: "The Mother of All Evils/The HCCBDD"	Resume
2004	The Grim Adventures of Billy & Mandy	Chocolate Sailor #2, Salty Dog, Vendor	Episode: "Chocolate Sailor/The Good, the Bad and the Toothless"	Resume
2005	Stroker and Hoop	David Copperfield, additional voices		Resume
2005	Wiener Park	Packy		Resume
2006	Ben 10	Jonah Melville	Episode: "The Krakken"	
2006	Avatar: The Last Airbender	Captain, Circus Master		Resume
2006	Justice League Unlimited	Gentleman Ghost, Watchtower Ops Tech		
2008	Ben & Izzy	Ibn Batouta	Episode: "Rug of War"	
2009–2014	Star Wars: The Clone Wars	Cham Syndulla, Jedi Master Ima-Gun-Di, Rush Clovis, others		Resume
2010	Batman: The Brave and the Bold	Firefly, Kobra, Ten-Eyed Man		
2010–2012	The Avengers: Earth's Mightiest Heroes	Heinrich Zemo, Abomination		
2010–2017	Regular Show	Gary, Baby #3, Dr. Kimmy, others		
2011	Ben 10: Ultimate Alien	Sir Cyrus, Night Nurse, others		
2011	Meet the Medic	Medic	Animated Team Fortress 2 short	
2011–2012	Thundercats	Mumm-Ra, Addicus, Captain Koinelius Tunar, others		
2011–2013	Generator Rex	Captain, Dr. Hodgson, Reddick, Sir Anthony Haden-Scott		
2012	Scooby-Doo! Spooky Games	Fortius, Announcer, additional voices	Short	
2013	Green Lantern: The Animated Series	Gil Broome / Steam Lantern	Episode: "Steam Lantern"	Resume
2013	Monsters vs. Aliens	Academic Dr. Cockroach, Party Dr. Cockroach	Episode: "The Two Faces of Dr. Cockroach"	
2013–2015	Hulk and the Agents of S.M.A.S.H.	Annihilus, Abomination, Mister Fantastic		
2013–2017	Avengers Assemble	Glorian, Baron Strucker	3 episodes	
2014	King Star King	Narrator, Chunkles		
2014	Sofia the First	Chef Andre, Sir Finnegan, Fisherman	7 episodes	
2014	Beware the Batman	Deathstroke, Man-Bat, others	6 episodes	
2014	Expiration Date	Medic	Animated Team Fortress 2 short	
2014	The Tom and Jerry Show	Large Marvin, Magic Mirror		
2015	Randy Cunningham: 9th Grade Ninja	Red Vest Punk Bot	Episode: "Escape from Scrap City" Replacing Billy Idol	
2015	Ultimate Spider-Man	Annihilus, Abomination		
2016	Star Wars Rebels	Cham Syndulla	2 episodes	
2016	Clarence	Fartholomew	Episode: "The Tails of Mardrynia"	
2016–2018	Voltron: Legendary Defender	Former Galra Prisoner, Haxus, Shay's Father		
2017	Be Cool, Scooby-Doo!	Francis, Bellington, Male Police Officer	2 episodes	
2017	Transformers: Robots in Disguise	Flamesnort, Jacknab, Pilfer	2 episodes	
2017–2019	Ben 10	Hex	Recurring role	
2017–2020	DuckTales	Falcon Graves	2 episodes	
2019	Guardians of the Galaxy	Serpent		
2019	Forky Asks a Question	Mr. Pricklepants		
2020	Glitch Techs	Male Gauntlet Voice	2 episodes	
2020	The Simpsons	Pubgoers, Londoners	Episode: "The 7 Beer Itch"	
2021	The Simpsons	MI5 Agents	Episode: "The Man from G.R.A.M.P.A."	
2021	Star Wars: The Bad Batch	Cham Syndulla	2 episodes	
2021	Arcane	Burly Henchman	Episode: "Happy Progress Day!"	
2021	Star Trek: Lower Decks	Togg, Old Klingon Officer	Episode: "wej Duj"	
2021–2024	What If...?	Additional Voices	14 episodes	
2022	Cars on the Road	Additional voices	4 episodes	
2022	Dogs in Space	Surgill	Episode: "Who Wants a Treaty?"	
2025	Your Friendly Neighborhood Spider-Man	Doctor Strange	2 episodes	
2025	Super Duper Bunny League	Lord Sourman	Episode: "Ye Olde Sourbreath!"	

==== Video games ====
Year	Title	Role	Notes	References
2002	The Mark of Kri	Ganguun		Resume
2002	X-Men: Next Dimension	Cyclops/Scott Summers, Pyro		Resume
2002	Star Wars: Bounty Hunter	Supply Ship Co-Pilot		Resume
2003	Rainbow Six 3: Raven Shield	Gutierrez		Resume
2003	Star Wars: Knights of the Old Republic	Griff Vao, Mekel, Vulkar Mechanic		Resume
2003	Lionheart: Legacy of the Crusader	William Shakespeare, additional voices		Resume
2003	Alter Echo	Paavo		Resume
2003	Star Wars Rogue Squadron III: Rebel Strike	Sarkli, Rebel Soldier 1, Stormtrooper 2, Commander 3, Wingman 4		Resume
2003	Gladius	All Warriors		Resume
2003	The Lord of the Rings: War of the Ring	Legolas, Elven Lightbearer		Resume
2003	Battlestar Galactica	Ensign Adama		Resume
2003	Fatal Frame II: Crimson Butterfly	Masumi Makimura, Man killed by Kusabi, Puppetmaster, Villager, additional voices	English dub	Resume
2003	Lords of Everquest	High Elf Cleric, Hathnul		Resume
2004	Ninja Gaiden	Gamov	English dub	
2004	Onimusha Blade Warriors	Samanosuke Akechi	English dub	
2004	Onimusha 3: Demon Siege	Hidemitsu Samanosuke Akechi	English dub	
2004	Tales of Symphonia	Altessa, Botta, Origin	English dub	Resume
2004	Call of Duty: United Offensive	Major Ingram		
2004	Gungrave: Overdose	Garino Creale Corsione, Hotel Manager	English dub	
2004	X-Men Legends	Cyclops, Pyro		
2004	The Bard's Tale	Additional voices		
2004	Halo 2	Prophet of Regret		
2004	Call of Duty: Finest Hour	Carlysle, Russian Captain		Resume
2004	Vampire: The Masquerade – Bloodlines	Trip, Copper, Phil, Boris, Brother Kanker		
2004	Forgotten Realms: Demon Stone	Drizzt Do'Urden, Male Elves		Resume
2004	Metal Gear Solid 3: Snake Eater	Soldier	English dub	
2004	Prince of Persia: Warrior Within	The Prince		Resume
2004	Star Wars: Knights of the Old Republic II – The Sith Lords	Nikko, additional voices		Resume
2005	The Punisher	Snowblind, additional voices		Resume
2005	Project Snowblind	Sgt. Stilwell		Resume
2005	Rise of the Kasai	Ganguun Priest		Resume
2005	Jade Empire	Sagacious Zu, Bladed Thesis, Thug, Slimy Merchant		Resume
2005	Guild Wars	Prince Rurik of Ascalon		Resume
2005	Haunting Ground	Young Lorenzo, Middle Lorenzo	English dub	Resume
2005	Rainbow Six: Lockdown	Dieter Weber, Jamamurad		Resume
2005	Fantastic Four	Classic Mr. Fantastic, additional voices		Resume
2005	Killer7	Hiro Kasai	English dub	Resume
2005	Dungeons & Dragons: Dragonshard	Kael, Silverblade		Resume
2005	The Matrix: Path of Neo	Merovingian, Agent Thompson		Resume
2005	Gun	Hootie, Fat Sam		Resume
2005	SOCOM U.S. Navy SEALs: Fireteam Bravo	Underwood		Resume
2005	Kingdom of Paradise	Genmei, Lei Gai	English dub	Resume
2006	Star Wars: Empire at War	Grand Admiral Thrawn, Noghri		Resume
2006	Metal Gear Solid 3: Subsistence	Soldiers	English dub	Resume
2006	Rainbow Six: Critical Hour	Dieter Weber		Resume
2006	The Outfit	Pere Francois		Resume
2006	Kingdom Hearts II	Luxord	English dub Also in Kingdom Hearts II Final Mix	
2006	X-Men: The Official Game	Sabretooth, Sentinel		Resume
2006	Dirge of Cerberus: Final Fantasy VII	Genesis Rhapsodos	English dub	
2006	Ninety-Nine Nights	Syumertt		Resume
2006	Yakuza	Jingu	English dub	
2006	Open Season	Beaver, Hunter 3		Resume
2006	Baten Kaitos Origins	Seph	English dub	
2006	Just Cause	Rico Rodriguez		Resume
2006	Destroy All Humans! 2	Agent Oranchov, Hippies, additional voices		Resume
2006	Marvel: Ultimate Alliance	Dark Cyclops, Bruce Banner, Crimson Dynamo		Resume
2006	Star Wars: Empire at War: Forces of Corruption	Grand Admiral Thrawn, additional voices		Resume
2006	Guild Wars Nightfall	Goren, additional voices		
2006	Gears of War	Minh Young Kim, Old Man Stranded, KR-25 Pilot		
2006	SOCOM U.S. Navy SEALs: Combined Assault	CIA Agent Underwood		Resume
2006	SOCOM U.S. Navy SEALs: Fireteam Bravo 2	Alec		Resume
2006	Spider-Man: Battle for New York	Steve Rogers / Captain America, Ben Urich		Resume
2006	Resistance: Fall of Man	General Hadley		Resume
2006	Gothic 3	Milten	English dub	Resume
2006	Metal Gear Solid: Portable Ops	Soviet Soldier, High Officer B	English dub	
2007	Ghost Rider	Blackheart, Demon Biker		Resume
2007	Gurumin: A Monstrous Adventure	Pierre, Doug	English dub	Resume
2007	300: March to Glory	Astinos, Persian Soldier, Spartan		Resume
2007	God of War II	Translator #1		Resume
2007	S.T.A.L.K.E.R.: Shadow of Chernobyl	Duty #1		Resume
2007	Lair	Rohn Partridge		Resume
2007	Enemy Territory: Quake Wars	Medic, Strogg		
2007	Spider-Man: Friend or Foe	Quentin Beck / Mysterio		
2007	Syphon Filter: Logan's Shadow	Dane Bishop		Resume
2007	Final Fantasy Tactics: The War of the Lions	Delita Heiral, additional voices		Resume
2007	Team Fortress 2	Medic, Archimedes The Undying		
2007	Ratchet & Clank Future: Tools of Destruction	Captain Slag	Uncredited	
2007	Pirates of the Caribbean Online	Davy Jones	Uncredited	Resume
2007	Uncharted: Drake's Fortune	Atoq Navarro	Also motion capture	
2007	Mass Effect	Sebastian Van Heerden, Salarian, Turian		Resume
2008	Kingdom Under Fire: Circle of Doom	Idol of Death, Curian		Resume
2008	No More Heroes	Travis Touchdown		
2008	God of War: Chains of Olympus	Messenger	Uncredited	Resume
2008	Ninja Gaiden II	Alexei, Changeling Dragon, Fiend, Bird, Wolf, Lizard	English dub	
2008	Hellboy: The Science of Evil	Scott Jr., additional voices		Resume
2008	Too Human	Wolf Rookie, Wolf Leader, Wolf Trooper #1		
2008	Ratchet & Clank Future: Quest for Booty	Captain Slag		Resume
2008	S.T.A.L.K.E.R.: Clear Sky	Duty, additional voices	English dub	Resume
2008	Spider-Man: Web of Shadows	Moon Knight, additional voices		
2008	Resistance 2	Daedelus, Infected Nathan Hale	Uncredited	Resume
2008	Valkyria Chronicles	Faldio Landzaat	English dub	
2008	Gears of War 2	Minh Young Kim, Henny, Chaps, Skorge, Kantus		
2008	Destroy All Humans! Path of the Furon	Endometriosis, Soldier		Resume
2008	The Rise of the Argonauts	Skiav, Ionian Mercenary, Cultist		Resume
2009	Halo Wars	Prophet of Regret, Spirit Officer, Pilot		
2009	MadWorld	Operator A, Kojack	English dub	
2009	Resistance: Retribution	James Grayson		Resume
2009	Army of Two: The 40th Day	Breznev		Resume
2009	Stormrise	Aiden Geary		Resume
2009	Bionic Commando	Thomas "Sniper" Clarke, FSA Recon Pilot		
2009	inFAMOUS	Lawyer, Homeless Man		Resume
2009	Kingdom Hearts 358/2 Days	Luxord	English dub Archive footage	
2009	G.I. Joe: The Rise of Cobra	Destro, Dr. Burkhart		
2009	Shadow Complex	Paramilitaries	English dub	Resume
2009	Wolfenstein	Deathshead		Resume
2009	Ninja Gaiden Sigma 2	Alexei	English dub	Resume
2009	Dreamkiller	Hell Angel, Rescue Worker		Resume
2009	Brütal Legend	Fletus, Warfathers		
2009	Uncharted 2: Among Thieves	Tenzin, Atoq Navarro (multiplayer), Serbian Soldiers	Motion capture only for Tenzin	
2009	Ratchet & Clank Future: A Crack in Time	Captain Slag		Resume
2009	Jak and Daxter: The Lost Frontier	Phoenix, Lieutenant, Shady Pirate		
2009	Dragon Age: Origins	Ademaro, Orzammar Entrance Guard, Proving Trainer, Bhelen Crier, Orzammar Noble, Tapster's Patron, Orzammar Guard		Resume
2009	Avatar: The Game	Na'vi, RDA		Resume
2009	The Saboteur	Sean Devlin	Also motion capture	
2010	No More Heroes 2: Desperate Struggle	Travis Touchdown		
2010	Final Fantasy XIII	Coccoon Inhabitants	English dub	In-game credits
2010	Warhammer 40,000: Dawn of War II – Chaos Rising	Backstabba, Commando Nob, Ork Boy		
2010	Resonance of Fate	Garigliano Soldier – Jean	English dub	
2010	Lost Planet 2	Mercenary, additional voices		Resume
2010	Metal Gear Solid: Peace Walker	Kazuhira Miller	English dub	
2010	Clash of the Titans	Ixas, Soldiers, Townspeople		
2010	StarCraft II: Wings of Liberty	Science Vessel, Hercules, additional voices		
2010	Kane & Lynch 2: Dog Days	Driver, Squad Henchman		Resume
2010	Valkyria Chronicles II	Faldio Landzaat	English dub	Resume
2010	Fallout: New Vegas	Super Mutant, Deputy Beagle, Mr Gutsy Robots, Creature Mutants, Ironbelly, additional voices		
2010	Tron Evolution: Battle Grids	Kalev	Uncredited	
2010	Blur	Morrissey	Unused cutscene	
2011	Bulletstorm	Doc Oliver, Novak, Skulls		
2011	Warhammer 40,000: Dawn of War II – Retribution	Imperial Guard's Voice of God, Kommando, Krusha, Warboss		
2011	Dragon Age II	Keran, Jansen, additional voices		Resume
2011	Thor: God of Thunder	Mangog		
2011	Hunted: The Demon's Forge	Wargar, Minotaur, additional voices		
2011	F.E.A.R. 3	Michael Becket		
2011	Resistance 3	Joseph Capelli	Replacing David Boat; Also motion capture	Resume
2011	Gears of War 3	Locust Kantus, Locust Boomer, Male Former		Resume
2011	Ratchet & Clank: All 4 One	Dr. Frumpus Croid		
2011	Uncharted 3: Drake's Deception	Talbot, Atoq Navarro (multiplayer)	Also motion capture	
2011	Call of Duty: Modern Warfare 3	Nikolai		
2011	The Elder Scrolls V: Skyrim	Brynjolf		
2011	Saints Row: The Third	The Boss (Male Voice 3)		
2011	Uncharted: Golden Abyss	Vincent Perez, Mercenary, Thug		
2011	Star Wars: The Old Republic	Various voices		Resume
2012	Asura's Wrath	Yasha	English dub	
2012	Resident Evil: Operation Raccoon City	Dee-Ay		
2012	Armored Core V	Neon, Men of Honor Unit D, Zodiac No. 4		
2012	Starhawk	Rifter 41		
2012	Diablo III	Male Demon Hunter		
2012	Darksiders II	The Archon		
2012	Guild Wars 2	Warrior		Resume
2012	Assassin's Creed III	George Washington		
2012	Transformers: Prime – The Game	Thunderwing		
2012	Guardians of Middle-earth	Bilbo Baggins		
2013	Sly Cooper: Thieves in Time	Coyote Guard		Resume
2013	Tomb Raider	Captain Conrad Roth		
2013	God of War: Ascension	Scribe of Hecatonchires		
2013	Gears of War: Judgment	Jack (Automated Voice), Crazy Radio Announcer, House (Automated Voice)		
2013	Marvel Heroes	Dormammu, Grim Reaper, Moon Knight		
2013	The Last of Us	Robert	Also motion capture	
2013	Saints Row IV	The Boss (Male Voice 3)		
2013	Kingdom Hearts HD 1.5 Remix	Luxord	English dub	Resume
2013	Skylanders: Swap Force	Hoot Loop		Resume
2013	Lego Marvel Super Heroes	Rhino, Aldrich Killian, Arnim Zola, Punisher, Union Jack		Resume
2013	Batman: Arkham Origins	Penguin's Enforcer, additional voices		Resume
2014	Metal Gear Solid V: Ground Zeroes	Kazuhira Miller	English dub Also facial capture	
2014	Diablo III: Reaper of Souls	Cort, Demon Hunter (Male)		
2014	Bound by Flame	Vulcan		
2014	WildStar	Nazrek the Progenitor, Councilor Vaelen, Clanlord Makaza, Mordechai Redmoon, Draken Male, Luminai Male		
2014	Skylanders: Trap Team	Blades, Hoot Loop		Resume
2014	Lego Batman 3: Beyond Gotham	Alfred Pennyworth, Captain Cold, Deadshot, Firefly, Manchester Black, Heat Wave		Resume
2014–2015	Game of Thrones	Lord Gregor Forrester, Duncan Tuttle, Andros		
2015	Saints Row: Gat out of Hell	The President of the United States		
2015	Infinite Crisis	Gaslight Batman		
2015	Batman: Arkham Knight	Officer Hargrave, Harley Thugs, Joker Thugs, Officer Boulden		
2015	Disney Infinity 3.0	Death Watch Commando, Imperial Officer, Race Announcer, Stormtrooper		
2015	Mad Max	Deep Friah		
2015	Metal Gear Solid V: The Phantom Pain	Kazuhira Miller	English dub Also facial capture	
2015	Skylanders: SuperChargers	Blades, Hoot Loop		
2015	Lego Dimensions	Alfred Pennyworth, ACU Trooper		
2015	Halo 5: Guardians	Spartan Leader		
2016	Uncharted 4: A Thief's End	Hector Alcazar, Atoq Navarro (multiplayer), Talbot (multiplayer)	Also motion capture	
2016	Edge of Nowhere	Victor Howard		
2016	Gears of War 4	Minh Young Kim		
2016	World of Final Fantasy	Diabolos		
2017	For Honor	Gudmundr Branson		
2017	Batman: The Enemy Within	Riddler		
2017	Middle-earth: Shadow of War	Nemesis Orcs, Humans, Herion		
2018	Conan Exiles	Mek-kamoses, The Archivist, additional voices		
2018	Destiny 2: Forsaken	Spider		
2018	Magic: The Gathering Arena	Dovin Baan		
2018	Metal Gear Survive	Kazuhira Miller (facial capture only)		
2018	Lego DC Super-Villains	Alfred Pennyworth, Gentleman Ghost, WayneTech Assassin		
2019	Travis Strikes Again: No More Heroes	Travis Touchdown		
2019	Kingdom Hearts III	Luxord, Davy Jones	English dub	
2019	Apex Legends	Ballistic (August Montgomery Brinkman)	Character added in Season 17: Arsenal in 2023	
2019	Gears 5	Niles Samson, Speaker, Scion, Warden, NPCs, Kantus, Skorge		
2020	Marvel Ultimate Alliance 3: The Black Order	Annihilus	Shadow of Doom DLC	
2020	Star Wars: Squadrons	Colonel Gralm	Also motion capture	
2020	Destiny 2: Beyond Light	Spider, Hector		
2020	Twin Mirror	Declan, Nick		
2021	Ratchet & Clank: Rift Apart	Emperor Nefarious		
2021	No More Heroes III	Travis Touchdown		
2022	Destiny 2: The Witch Queen	Spider		
2024	Disney Speedstorm	Davy Jones		
2025	Dune Awakening	Sub-Prefect Tors, Alastair Christian Chim		

=== Live-action acting ===
==== Films ====
Year	Title	Role	Notes	References
1998	The Werewolf Reborn!	Peter Kranek		
2002	High Voltage	Gavin P. Templeton III		Resume
2002	Gladiator	Marcus Areolus	Short film	Resume
2005	The Great War of Magellan	Extra	Short film	Resume
2008	Body of Lies	News Correspondent	Uncredited	Resume
2014	I Know That Voice	Himself	Documentary	

==== Television ====
Year	Title	Role	Notes	References
1997	Buffy the Vampire Slayer	Machida	Episode: "Reptile Boy"	Resume
1997–1998	Babylon 5	Byron, Morann	9 episodes	Resume
1998	Babylon 5: In the Beginning	Morann	Television film	Resume
1998	Beverly Hills, 90210	Richard	Episode: "Confession"	Resume
1999	Nash Bridges	Bruce Jenkel	Episode: "Get Bananas"	Resume
2000	Charmed	Demon of Illusion	Episode: "Chick Flick"	Resume
2001	Titans	Skyler	Episode: "Someone Wicked This Way Comes"	Resume
2001	Angel	Pockla	Uncredited; Episode: "Dead End"	Resume
2002	Arli$$	Extra	Episode: "Playing It Safe"	Resume
2003	Rubbing Charlie	Packy	Television film	Resume
2006	CSI: Miami	Danny Walters	Episode: "If Looks Could Kill"	Resume
2007	Entourage	Photo Shoot Director	Episode: "Snow Job"	Resume
2008	In Plain Sight	Vidonne Gustonne	Episode: "Who Shot Jay Arnstein?"	Resume
2008	The Starter Wife	Jeff	3 episodes	Resume
2011	NCIS: Los Angeles	Prague Henchman	Episode: "Familia"	Resume
2011	Criminal Minds	Lachlan McDermott	Episode: "It Takes a Village"	Resume
2015	The World of Steam	Lord Grey	Episode: "The Duelist"	
2019	The Orville	Krill Captain Jackazh	Episode: "Blood of Patriots"	
