= Resistance =

Resistance may refer to:

== Arts, entertainment, and media ==
=== Comics ===
- Either of two similarly named but otherwise unrelated comic book series, both published by Wildstorm:
  - Resistance (comics), based on the video game of the same title
  - The Resistance (WildStorm), by Justin Gray, Jimmy Palmiotti, and Juan Santacruz
- The Resistance (AWA Studios), an AWA Studios comic book meta series
- Resistance: Book One, graphic novel series by Carla Jablonski with art by Leland Purvis and published by First Second Books

=== Fictional characters ===
- Resistance (Star Wars), the primary protagonist organization in the Star Wars sequel trilogy
- The Resistance, one of two factions in Ingress

=== Films ===
- Resistance (1945 film), a 1945 French film
- Resistance (1992 film), a 1992 Australian film
- Resistance (2003 film), a 2003 war film, with Bill Paxton
- Resistance (2011 film), a 2011 war film, with Michael Sheen
- Resistance (2020 film), a 2020 war film, with Jesse Eisenberg
- The Resistance (film), a 2011 Chinese war film
- The Resistance Banker (2018), a Dutch drama

=== Games ===
- Resistance (video game series), a series of alternate history sci-fi shooters developed for Sony video game consoles
  - Resistance: Fall of Man, a Sony PlayStation 3 game
  - Resistance 2, sequel to Resistance: Fall of Man
  - Resistance 3, the third game in the main series
  - Resistance: Retribution, a Sony PlayStation Portable game
  - Resistance: Burning Skies, a Sony PlayStation Vita game
- Operation Flashpoint: Resistance, expansion pack of video game Operation Flashpoint
- "Resistance", a map of Call of Duty: Modern Warfare 3 multiplayer
- The Resistance (game)

=== Literature ===
- Resistance (Sheers novel), a 2007 alternative history novel by Owen Sheers
- Resistance (Star Trek), a Star Trek: The Next Generation novel set after Star Trek: Nemesis
- Resistance: The Underground War in Europe, 1939-1945, a 2022 book by Halik Kochanski
- Resistance, a 1995 novel by Anita Shreve
- The Resistance (Applegate novel), an Animorphs book

=== Music ===
==== Groups and labels ====
- Resistance Records, a white power music label

==== Albums ====
- Resistance (Burning Spear album), 1986 album
- Resistance (EP), a 2002 EP by Mika Nakashima
- Resistance (Alove for Enemies album), 2006 album
- The Resistance (album), 2009
- Resistance (The Casualties album), a 2012 album by New York street punk band The Casualties
- Resistance (Winds of Plague album), a 2013 album by American deathcore band Winds of Plague
- Resistance, a 2019 album by IQ

==== Songs ====
- "Resistance" (Muse song), 2010
- "Resistance" (Clock DVA song), 1983
- "Resistance", a song by Japanese band High and Mighty Color
- "Resistance", a song by Moka Only from Airport 6, 2012
- "Resistance", a song by Soulfly from Enslaved, 2012
- "La Resistance" (South Park song) a song from the musical South Park: Bigger, Longer & Uncut
- "The Resistance", song by rock band Anberlin on New Surrender

=== Television ===
==== Series ====
- Resistance (TV series), a 2014 French television period drama
- Star Wars Resistance, a 2018 American animated television show about the namesake military organization
- Resistance (miniseries), a 2019 Irish TV miniseries

==== Episodes ====
- "Resistance" (Battlestar Galactica), a Battlestar Galactica episode
- "Resistance" (Star Trek: Voyager episode), the 28th episode of Star Trek: Voyager

=== Other arts, entertainment, and media ===
- Resistance (Doctor Who audio), a Doctor Who audio presentation
- Resistance (anarchist periodical), anarchist periodical published in New York from 1947 to 1954
- Resistance (neo-Nazi magazine), a white supremacist music magazine
- Resistance: Journal of the Earth Liberation Movement, an earth liberation magazine

== Politics and military ==
- Resistance (YBNP), from 2011, new name of Young BNP (ages 18–30), a political youth organization
- HMS Resistance, the name of four ships of the Royal Navy, and one planned one
- Resistance during World War II
  - French Resistance
  - German resistance to Nazism
  - Greek resistance
  - Italian resistance movement
  - Korean Resistance
  - Polish resistance movement in World War II
  - Yugoslav resistance
- Resistance movement, an organized effort to oppose a legally established government or an occupying power
  - Civil resistance
  - Draft evasion, also draft resistance, organized or personal opposition to military conscription
  - Nonviolent resistance
  - Resistance through culture
- Resistance: Young Socialist Alliance, an Australian Marxist organisation
- White Aryan Resistance
- The Resistance (American political movement), a movement protesting the presidency of Donald Trump

== Science and healthcare ==
=== Botany and horticulture ===
- Pesticide resistance
- Plant disease resistance

=== Ecology ===
- Resistance (ecology)

=== Healthcare ===
- Disease resistance, the ability of an organism to resist diseases it is susceptible to
- Airway resistance, a concept in respiratory physiology
- Antibiotic resistance, used for bacteria resistant to antibiotics
- Drug resistance, the reduction in effectiveness of a drug
- Psychological resistance, the forces that counteract progress in psychoanalysis and psychotherapy
  - Resistance (psychoanalysis), the concept of resistance in psychoanalytic theory

=== Physics ===
- Electrical resistance, the measure of the degree to which a conductor opposes an electric current through that conductor
- Friction
  - Drag (physics) ("air resistance"), fluid or gas forces opposing motion and flow
- Geological resistance, a measure of how well minerals resist erosive factors
  - Hydraulic conductivity, the ease with which water can move through pore spaces or fractures in soil or rock
- Hardness, in materials science
- Thermal shock resistance, a measure of resistance of a material to temperature jumps
- Thermal resistance, a measure of difficulty of heat transfer through a substance
  - Thermal conductivity, how well heat is conducted through a substance
  - Thermal resistance in electronics, heat considerations in electronics design

== Other uses ==
- Resistance (creativity), a concept created by author Steven Pressfield illustrating a purported mythical universal force he claims acts against human creativity
- La Résistance (professional wrestling)
- Resistance welding, a group of welding processes
- Support and resistance, concepts in the technical analysis of securities in finance
- SSPX Resistance, a Catholic traditionalist loosely group formed by Richard Williamson

== See also ==
- Resistants, a supervillain group from Marvel Comics
