= Resistance mutation =

Resistance mutations are mutations producing a resistant phenotype. These include:

- Resistance (disambiguation) § Botany and horticulture
- Resistance (disambiguation) § Healthcare
- Resistance mutation (virology)

== See also ==
- Resistance gene (disambiguation)
