= Conan (2007 video game) =

2007 action-adventure game

- Cover art
- Developer: Nihilistic Software
- Publisher: THQ
- Director: Robert Huebner
- Designer: Steve Thoms
- Artist: Yujin Kiem
- Composer: Mike Reagan
- Platforms: PlayStation 3; Xbox 360
- Release: EU: September 28, 2007; AU: October 11, 2007; NA: October 23, 2007
- Genres: Action-adventure, hack and slash
- Mode: Single-player

Conan is a 2007 action-adventure game developed by Nihilistic Software and published by THQ for the PlayStation 3 and Xbox 360. Additionally, the game can be purchased from the Xbox digital store and played on Xbox One and Xbox Series consoles through the Xbox backwards compatibility program.

Players take control of the titular hero, Conan the Barbarian, from Robert E. Howard's fantasy literature.

In Conan, the hero is on a quest to recover his lost armor and defeat an evil wizard. Conan can fight with sword and shield, two-handed weapons, or a weapon in each hand. Starting with several basic attacks, the barbarian gains experience points by killing enemies. By exchanging these points for additional attacks, players improve the hero's fighting abilities. Magic powers complement Conan's arsenal, including the abilities to turn enemies into stone and conjure firestorms. The game also features context-sensitive action sequences in which players press a sequence of buttons displayed on the screen to complete actions such as killing powerful enemies and interacting with the environment.

Critics enjoyed Conan's combat system and gory kills, but said the game failed to match the experience offered in God of War. Reactions varied on the game's depiction of the Conan universe; several critics praised the emulation of Frank Frazetta's famous artwork, but others found the game's graphics drab and of low resolution. Regarding the audio, Golden Globe-winning actor Ron Perlman was both praised and criticized for his voice work as Conan. Composer Mike Reagan received acclaim for the game's music and later gave live performances of the game's soundtrack at Video Games Live shows. Despite the average reviews and commercial success of the Conan franchise, Conan sold poorly and was a financial loss for THQ.

== Gameplay ==
Players control Conan the Barbarian from a third-person perspective while attempting to advance through the series of levels that subdivide the game. The gameplay is the same for each level: Conan moves from area to area, fighting groups of enemies until he reaches the end. At the end of certain levels, the barbarian has to fight a more powerful opponent called a boss. Defeating a boss involves a two-stage process: Conan has to inflict heavy damage on the creature and thus trigger an interactive button-pressing sequence that players have to complete to kill the boss. Several cycles of this process are required to defeat most bosses. Besides combat, button-pressing sequences are also used to interact with the environment, such as knocking down obstacles to create passageways, or as parts of platforming sequences in which Conan climbs walls and jumps from ledge to ledge. Players can save their progress by using special stones that are placed throughout the game.

A button to initiate a counterattack is shown on pressing the block button at the correct moment.

Conan starts each level with his default one-handed sword, and can pick up shields and other weapons to switch between three styles of attack: fighting with a one-handed weapon, a two-handed weapon, or a weapon in each hand. Each style features several attacks with names like "Cimmerian Charge" and "Black River Rage". The barbarian can change or stop his attacks at any time, creating many options in combat. When Conan lands a sequence of successive hits on his enemies, he activates his Song of Death, which increases the damage of his attacks for a short time. For defense, Conan can roll under enemy attacks or block them. If the player presses the block button just when an enemy is about to hit the barbarian, an image of a controller button appears on the screen. Pressing the button shown will make Conan execute a gory counterattack, which instantly kills the enemy. Other methods to kill enemies include grabbing and throwing them against other objects, such as spikes and other enemies, or over cliffs.

In addition to physical assaults, Conan can use magic powers to damage enemies. Gaining these powers in later stages of the game, the barbarian can turn opponents into stone, call down fire from the heavens, and summon flocks of ravens to do his bidding. These magical attacks can quickly end fights, but their use is limited by the number of magic points Conan has. When an enemy is killed, colored runes—each one conferring its own special advantage—are released and gathered by the barbarian. Red runes act as experience points, which are exchanged for advanced attacks. Green and blue runes restore Conan's health and magic points, respectively. The barbarian can also obtain runes by breaking containers and freeing maidens from captivity.

== Plot and setting ==
In Conan, the hero is on a quest to recover his lost armor and defeat an evil wizard. The game takes place in the world of Hyboria, a creation of Robert E. Howard for his stories about Conan the Barbarian. Conan's developer, Nihilistic Software, chose several Hyborian locations, such as Kush, Stygia, and the Barachan Isles, to establish a link to the literary world. Hyboria was designed to be a fantasy version of Earth around 10,000 BC, and its civilizations were based on those from the Stone to Iron Ages. Nihilistic portrayed the plains of Kush, a fictional Africa, as savannahs with villages of straw huts. Stygia was illustrated as a land filled with structures resembling Egyptian tombs and the Barachan Isles as lushly jungled islands.

=== Characters ===
Conan is the protagonist in many of Howard's stories: a franchise has been built around the character, and Frank Frazetta's paintings have further elevated the barbarian's profile in pop culture. Howard presented his barbarian hero as a strong, shrewd, barbaric, and ambitious man in a primitive world of magic. His stories are simple and portray Conan overcoming a series of obstacles to defeat the antagonists with his physical prowess. Nihilistic originally intended to stay faithful to the literature, but the writers strayed from the canon by showing the barbarian as willing to use magic. The literary Conan abhors magic, but Nihilistic reasoned that, in order to restore his armor to its original non-magical state, he is willing to use the magic it has been cursed with.

The developers did, however, stay true to the physical depictions of the barbarian. Reflecting how fights are described in the stories, players can kill foes in the goriest manner—dismembering and disemboweling them. Nihilistic wanted to show that the brutal killings are considered natural by Conan and not executed out of a thirst for blood. The inspiration for Conan's moves came from several sources, but mostly from Frazetta's artwork. The animators took several of Conan's poses straight from the paintings and modeled his movements after those of the characters in the feature animation Tarzan and the action films Troy and Ong Bak. The names of several fighting techniques such as "Gwahlur's Leap", "Bel's Gambit", and "Camel Punch" were also based on names and events from the Conan stories and films. To garner extra publicity, the publisher THQ hired Golden Globe-winning actor Ron Perlman to provide the voice for Conan.

Typical Conan stories by Howard featured leading females who were occasionally damsels in distress. However, they were also strong and fearless women who would rescue the hero at crucial moments. Nihilistic cast the game's leading female character, A'kanna, in this mold; the warrior queen and Conan aid each other in several parts of the game. By contrast, there are topless, chained-up women scattered across the game's levels. However, these are in the game only because of the developer's belief that nudity was integral to a Conan story. Showing their breasts and acting in a burlesque manner, these damsels-in-distress reward players with red runes when rescued.

=== Story ===
Howard's short story, "Queen of the Black Coast", served as the inspiration for the game's plot. In the short story, Conan has a brief romance with Bêlit, a pirate queen. Near the end of the story a demonic creature kills Bêlit and Conan seeks revenge. The creature, however, is stronger than Conan, overpowers him, and is about to kill him when Bêlit's spirit startles it and inspires Conan to kill the beast. The game's story follows a similar theme with A'kanna in the role of Bêlit. Told as a campfire story, cut scenes—in the form of static artwork or animation rendered by the game engine—open and close each level with narratives from an elderly A'kanna.

The story starts at Parad Isle where Conan is raiding a tomb. Instead of finding treasure, he unknowingly frees Graven, a wizard who had been confined in a magical prison for his transgressions. Showing no gratitude, the wizard curses Conan's armor, scatters it across the world, and teleports the barbarian away. Vowing to retrieve his armor, Conan meets A'kanna while he is fighting through a pirate base. Teaming up with the barbarian to find his armor, the warrior queen hopes to use its magic to end the curse—the Black Death—that is causing her people to kill each other. Their quest leads players through several locations and boss creatures such as dragons, undead elephants, and krakens. Flashbacks are shown when retrieving a piece of armor after killing certain bosses; these back-stories tell of Graven's imprisonment of the gods, his plan to sacrifice his daughter A'kanna, and his creation of the Black Death to transform the world to his liking.

In the last level, Conan has retrieved all his armor and returns to Parad Isle to rescue A'kanna from her father. After a long boss fight and several button-pressing sequences, Conan slays the wizard at the bottom of the ocean. Graven's defeat frees the gods he had imprisoned, and they bring him back to life for eternal punishment. The story ends with the separation of the barbarian and the warrior queen. Conan goes on to fulfill his destiny to be a king as written in Howard's stories. A'kanna, however, grows old in a village, telling stories to children and never forgetting Conan.

== Development ==
The artwork in the game, such as the environment of Kush, was conceived as oil paintings (upper image) and created as digital images (lower image).

In 2005, THQ acquired the rights to produce a series of video games featuring Conan the Barbarian and the world of Hyboria. This news came to the attention of Nihilistic Software who had just completed the action game Marvel Nemesis: Rise of the Imperfects. The video game developer was looking to develop an action game similar to God of War for its next project and saw the world of Conan as a good setting. The team quickly built a prototype to demonstrate its concept to THQ and received approval for the project. The video game publisher officially announced the game to the industry on February 26, 2007.

Nihilistic decided to use the features of other action games for Conan. While God of War was its inspiration for the camera system, Ninja Gaiden was a great influence on the combat engine. The team wanted to emulate the complexity of Ninja Gaiden's combat system, with many attacking options and an equal emphasis on being alert to the actions of enemies. Nihilistic also wanted the game to appeal to button mashing players as well as those who want to control their character with finesse. In addition, it designed the game to increase the frequency and difficulty of encounters as players advance through the levels.

Conan was developed to be released on the Xbox 360 and the PlayStation 3. Although the architectures of the two consoles were very different, Nihilistic designed its product to perform equally on both of them, using force feedback and motion sensing to enhance the playing experience. Conan was originally scheduled for an early 2008 release, but was brought forward to the second half of 2007 because of THQ's poor performance in that fiscal year. After the game was released in Europe, Nihilistic made demos of the game available for downloading over Xbox Live and PlayStation Network.

=== Visual style ===
The appearance of Howard's Conan and Hyboria in the popular imagination owes much to Frazetta's distinctive oil paintings. While Nihilistic's writers tried to tell a story in Howard's style, its artists attempted to emulate Frazetta's style on the electronic display screen. Instead of making each computer representation as realistic as possible, they created models based mainly on their perception of each object's intrinsic nature. The artists used video graphics technology such as normal mapping technique to emulate brush strokes on the models' textures. These digital brush strokes were visible on the cliffs in the game. The character models were outlined with light colors instead of dark ones, creating the subtle blend of object and background found in oil paintings, and fog effects allowed the team to recreate Frazetta's use of shadows in the middle area of the image. To complete the game's appearance, the artists used darker color palettes, motifs, and themes to present a more serious mood, in harmony with the gore and nudity in the game.

=== Music ===
Mike Reagan, a music composer noted for his work in video games such as Darkwatch and God of War, was hired by THQ to write the music for Conan. To begin, he wanted to compose simple but powerful melodies, and looked to Basil Poledouris's score for the 1982 film Conan the Barbarian for inspiration. As Reagan played development copies of the game, he was influenced by two other works: Igor Stravinsky's barbaric and sensual ballet music The Rite of Spring, and Bernard Hermann's score from the 1958 action film The 7th Voyage of Sinbad. Each week, Nihilistic and Reagan updated each other with copies of their work-in-progress, synchronizing their efforts. Reagan also studied with noted percussion artists Denny Seiwell, Emil Richards, and Michael Duffy to gain further insight on the use of drums to accompany the game's bloody and violent plot. After mastering the soundtrack, he brought the music of Conan to an October 2007 Video Games Live show, performing it live in Los Angeles, United States.

== Reception ==
Reception

Aggregate score
Aggregator	Score	
Aggregator	PS3	Xbox 360
Metacritic	69/100	69/100

Review scores
Publication	Score	
Publication	PS3	Xbox 360
Destructoid	N/A	4/10
Edge	N/A	7/10
Electronic Gaming Monthly	5.5/10	5.5/10
Eurogamer	N/A	7/10
Game Informer	7/10	7/10
GamePro	4/5	3.75/5
GameRevolution	C+	C+
GameSpot	7.5/10	7.5/10
GameSpy	3.5/5	3.5/5
GameTrailers	7/10	7/10
GameZone	7/10	6/10
IGN	(UK) 7.5/10 (US) 6.7/10	(UK) 7.5/10 (US) 6.7/10
Official Xbox Magazine (US)	N/A	6.5/10
PlayStation: The Official Magazine	7.5/10	N/A
411Mania	7/10	7.5/10

Conan received "average" reviews on both platforms according to the review aggregation website Metacritic. Most critics agreed that the game's best selling point was its variety in combat. They had a lot of fun with its easy-to-learn controls, skill customization, and most of all, the varied brutal depictions of Conan's kills. TeamXbox said the combat system "blossoms into a complex string of commands that will reward the user (with gore) for pressing the right buttons at the right time". The pounding, militaristic orchestra tunes accompanying the action further enhanced the critics' experience with the game.

In Japan, Famitsu gave it a score of all four sevens for a total of 28 out of 40, while Famitsu Xbox 360 gave its Xbox 360 version a score of one six, two fives, and one six for a total of 22 out of 40.

Critics had mixed opinions about three prominent features of the game: voice acting, artwork, and faithfulness to Howard's writings. Perlman earned acclaim for his vocal performance and gravely voice that matched the game's dialogue, but he also received criticism for not sounding like a barbarian. A few applauded Nihilistic for capturing the oil painting feel of Frazetta's art, but several others said the graphics consisted of drab-looking environments that were jagged-edged and pixelated when zoomed in. Although the animations were rated to be smooth and vivid, the lack of variety among enemy character models was criticized. Several critics also praised Nihilistic for recreating the atmosphere of Howard's stories. The decision to have Conan use magic was, however, called a "blasphemy" by IGN. G4 Canada disagreed and forgave the game on the grounds that it was mostly faithful to the books. Ray Huling of The Escapist said the game's developers misunderstood Conan's appeal to the masses. In the journalist's opinion, Howard's depiction of Conan's brutal physical nature called attention to the dull nature of their lives and offered them a temporary escape. Furthermore, Huling said that Nihilistic used the characteristics of Conan for superficial purposes and that, in copying the mechanics of another game without any groundbreaking innovations of its own, Nihilistic missed the essence of Howard's stories and created a shell of what its game could have been.

=== Comparisons to God of War ===
Many critics complained that Conan copied many ideas from God of War. Game Informer referred to this imitation as "[Conan] groveling at Kratos' feet, begging for gameplay wisdom". A few reviewers, however, found this forgivable and said the game was made to be fun without any higher ambitions. Conan's camera system irritated several critics for failing to provide an adequate view of the situation at certain critical moments. Its puzzles were oversimple and lacked clear directions for proceeding to the next step. The artificial intelligence for the adversaries in the game was found to be predictable and flawed by a few critics. In addition, they found the final encounter with Graven to be overlong and frustrating. Calling the fight "as painful as a trip to the proctologist", IGN and Game Informer judged it to be one of the worst boss fights in video game history.

=== Sales ===
Despite the average reviews and success of Howard's franchise, Conan sold poorly and failed to recoup THQ's investment. The publisher publicly announced that the game's poor sales contributed to their US$20 million write-off in fiscal year 2008.

=== Mature content ===
Although the game's violence was praised by the gaming industry, it was condemned by the National Institute on Media and the Family, which placed Conan on a list of games that parents were urged to avoid buying for their children. Conan's Mature rating from the Entertainment Software Rating Board, largely due to its violent content, made the game a target for a law being pushed in California, United States. Proposed in 2005, the law was intended to regulate sales of Mature-rated games. It was blocked by a legal challenge from the gaming industry in 2007, but California Governor Arnold Schwarzenegger, who played Conan in the 1982 film, appealed the judgment, seeking to ensure that Conan and other games with similar levels of violence would be sold only to those older than 17. On February 20, 2009, his appeal was rejected by the Ninth Circuit Court of Appeals, who ruled that such a restriction violated the First Amendment to the United States Constitution.
