= La Résistance (disambiguation) =

La Résistance, literally "The Resistance", typically refers to the French Resistance against German occupation in World War II.

La Résistance may also refer to:

- La Résistance (professional wrestling), a professional wrestling team
- "La Resistance (Medley)", a song from the soundtrack of South Park: Bigger, Longer & Uncut

== See also ==
- Resistance (disambiguation)
