= Call of Duty: Black Ops: Declassified =

2012 video game

- North American cover art
- Developer: nStigate Games
- Publisher: Activision
- Series: Call of Duty
- Platform: PlayStation Vita
- Release: WW: November 13, 2012
- Genre: First-person shooter
- Modes: Single-player, multiplayer

Call of Duty: Black Ops: Declassified is a 2012 first-person shooter video game, developed by nStigate Games and published by Activision for the PlayStation Vita. The game was announced at Sony's Electronic Entertainment Expo conference.

The game features single player, multiplayer, and hostile modes, with the game taking place between Call of Duty: Black Ops, and its sequel, Black Ops II.

Upon release, Black Ops: Declassified received negative reviews, with criticism ranging from the game's poor enemy AI, numerous glitches, flawed multiplayer, among several other issues.

== Gameplay ==
Call of Duty: Black Ops: Declassified makes use of the Vita's dual-analog sticks, touch screen and rear touch pad. These include the ability to hold breath using the rear touch pad. The ability to throw grenades is similar to Resistance: Burning Skies in that the front touch screen is used. The ability to melee is achieved by swiping or touching anywhere on the touch screen. An all new mode called 'Hostiles' has been added, in which the player is pitted against 4 different waves of enemies. Nihilistic has confirmed that a Zombies mode would not be included with the game at launch.

During Gamescom 2012, when Call of Duty: Black Ops: Declassified was shown, the graphics were criticized. Nihilistic responded by improving the visuals of the game with improved lighting, better models of enemies and guns, and better textures.

=== Single-player ===
The single player campaign in Call of Duty: Black Ops: Declassified consists of objective-based missions that players can revisit to improve their performance. The single player part of the game is actually titled Operations that has the main story of the game with an addition of a Time Trials mode which has the player running and gunning down wooden enemies to beat the time.

=== Hostiles ===
This new mode closely resembles Call of Duty: Modern Warfare 3's Survival Mode. It is called 'Hostiles', in which the player is pitted against 4 different waves of enemies in different waves of 12 or 16 enemies, each wave carries a specific weapon. After all 4 different waves of enemies are killed they are spawned again in waves. The maps used are from the multiplayer part of the game with the exception of the map Shipment. The maps are called Shattered, Rocket, Range, Intel and Nukehouse. At the end of each wave a care package will be dropped onto the map and the player must capture it before the next wave starts or the care package will disappear. The care package may contain one of the following: a mortar strike, a sentry gun or a weapon.

=== Multiplayer ===
The multiplayer in Call of Duty: Black Ops: Declassified includes 4-vs-4 matches through Wi-Fi, with the ability to play with friends through the party app on the PlayStation Vita. The game features a total of seven maps, seven killstreaks, five game modes, eighteen primary weapons, ten secondary weapons, six equipment items and twelve perks. Players are given five preset classes, five custom slots, and one class slot shared through 'Near' which only lasts a few lives in Multiplayer. There is also the ability to prestige when the player levels up to at least rank 40.

== Story ==
On January 12, 1990, after the U.S. invasion of Panama, CIA analyst Ryan Jackson conducted a report on several operations carried out by operators Alex Mason and Frank Woods, handled by agent Jason Hudson. The report makes several mentions of the trio's involvement with several figures, such as Nikita Dragovich, President John F. Kennedy and Raul Menendez.

On April 29, 1975, Woods was sent to Saigon, Vietnam to destroy several top secret CIA machines called Parable. The day after, he arrived at Tan Son Nhat International Airport to rescue a group of CIA operatives and evacuate them to safety.

In 1976, Mason was assigned to Operation Active Measures, which had him going to Berlin, Germany to retrieve intel from a Stasi defector. However, the defector was killed before the exchange could be made. Mason tracked the killers to a KGB spy ring, led by Colonel Mikhail Belov. Mason managed to retrieve the intel and killed Belov in the process.

In winter of 1977, Hudson learned of an attempt by the KGB to revive Project Nova, at the same place where he effectively shut it down: Mount Yamantau. A squad led by Woods was sent into the site, however only he managed to survive. Woods went into the facility and killed Schlussel, the protegè of former Nova 6 creator Friedrich Steiner. Intel recovered from the facility led Hudson and Woods to a KGB missile launch site, where they planned to add a Nova gas dispersal device to an intercontinental ballistic missile. Woods was able to stop the launch, but then learned that one of his squad mates was captured at Yamantau after their arrival. He went to save the squad mate against Hudson's orders, but was too late to save him. Woods then set charges around the facility and destroyed it.

On July 19, 1979, Mason was sent to Managua, Nicaragua to escort an undercover operative, captured by Sandinistas and KGB forces, to safety. Three months later, he was sent to Afghanistan to rescue a high-value target who had intel on the Mujahideen.

Jackson finished his report with information regarding the 1982 invasion on the Menendez Cartel, which ended with the death of Jose Luiz Menendez. Though successful, the mission set things up for Jose's son, Raul Menendez, to become the new leader of the Cartel.

== Release ==
Call of Duty: Black Ops: Declassified was released on November 13, 2012, in North America, at the same time as Black Ops II. The game is also available in a PS Vita bundle pack with a digital version of the game to download, a free 4GB PS Vita memory card and a special COD-themed rear panel and pouch. A free downloadable copy of Call of Duty: Roads to Victory is included in the boxed version of North American copies of the game.

== Reception ==
Reception

Aggregate score
Aggregator	Score
Metacritic	33/100

Review scores
Publication	Score
1Up.com	D−
G4	0.5/5
Game Informer	3/10
Giant Bomb	1/5
IGN	4/10
Pocket Gamer	2/5
3 News	1.5/5

Call of Duty: Black Ops: Declassified received negative reviews upon release, holding an average score of 33/100 at Metacritic based on 58 reviews, making it the lowest-rated game in the series.

Game Informer's Dan Ryckert called the game "appalling". Giant Bomb's Jeff Gerstmann cited it as a "disjointed mess", criticizing the awkward touch-based controls, glitches causing enemies to get stuck on level geometry, and multiplayer maps "so tiny that you'll literally spawn with an enemy in your crosshairs". Daniel Rutledge of 3 News said that the single-player campaign was less than an hour long, describing it as "terrible value for money". Peter Willington of Pocket Gamer was also unimpressed, calling it "a massive middle finger to the fans". Marty Sliva of 1Up.com gave the game a D− stating: "If Black Ops 2 did its best to advance the series, Declassified seems hell-bent on negating all of that progress."

Despite the negative reception, the game debuted at position 16th on the UK sales chart, making it the second-biggest game debut on the PlayStation Vita in 2012, the first being Assassin's Creed III: Liberation.
