= Resistance gene =

A resistance gene is any gene producing resistance against an agent. This gene may produce:

- Drug resistance

- Antimicrobial resistance
- Multiple drug resistance

- Disease resistance

- Plant disease resistance

- Gene-for-gene relationship

- Tolerance to infections

- Pesticide resistance

- Acaricide resistance
- Insecticide resistance

- Pyrethroid resistance
- Larvicide resistance

- Herbicide resistance
- Fungicide resistance
- Nematicide resistance
- Anthelmintic/vermicide resistance

- Resistance to parasites

- Resistance to mites
- Resistance to ticks
- Resistance to herbivores - plant defense against herbivory

== See also ==
- Resistance mutation (disambiguation)
