= Resistance: Retribution =

2009 video game

- Developer: Bend Studio
- Publisher: Sony Computer Entertainment
- Directors: Christopher Reese; John Garvin
- Designer: Darren Yager
- Programmers: Joseph Adzima; Darren Chisum
- Artist: Gerald Harrison
- Writers: John Garvin; Jeff Ross
- Composer: Garry Schyman
- Series: Resistance
- Platform: PlayStation Portable
- Release: NA: March 17, 2009; EU: March 20, 2009; AU: March 26, 2009
- Genre: Third-person shooter
- Modes: Single-player, multiplayer

Resistance: Retribution is a 2009 third-person shooter video game developed by Bend Studio and published by Sony Computer Entertainment for the PlayStation Portable. It is a spin-off of the Resistance series, set between Resistance: Burning Skies and Resistance 2, and the first to not be developed by Insomniac Games. Sony has discontinued online support for the game.

An emulated version of the game was released on February 20, 2024, for the PlayStation 4 and PlayStation 5.

== Gameplay ==
An early screenshot of the game

The game offers 8-player online multiplayer matches with modes that include Team Deathmatch, Capture the Flag, Containment, Free for All and Assimilation.

The aiming system is designed differently, instead of pressing buttons to lock against cover, it will automatically lock the player to cover when he or she goes near cover. Aim assist, as observed in Resistance: Fall of Man, is also present in Retribution. Retribution features new characters and weapons, as well as a non-replenishing life bar.

On October 9, 2008, it was announced that players with a copy of Resistance 2 in their PlayStation 3, while having their PSP 2000 or 3000 (also works with PSP 1000) connected via AV output to the television, will be able to play Resistance: Retribution with a DualShock 3 controller. This is a new, cross-link feature of both games dubbed PSP Plus. While PSP Plus is enabled, it has been reported that aim assist will be disabled and that players would be able to remap their controls to better use the extra inputs on the PlayStation 3 controller. DualShock 3 rumble will also be supported.

Also announced was Infected mode which, by connecting Resistance: Retribution to Resistance 2 using a USB cable, going into the R2 options screen, and selecting "Infect your PSP!" provides an alternate story within the alternate history. While in prison for desertion, Grayson is recruited by Specter Lieutenant David LaSalle (from the R2 storyline) and is infected with a mutated version of the Chimera virus, a different version of the virus that infects Nathan Hale.

While playing in "Infected" mode, Grayson wears a Specter uniform and has glowing Chimeran eyes. Characters in the story will be aware of Grayson's Chimeran infection which will alter their behavior accordingly. He gets to use one of the new weapons from R2: the HE .44 Magnum, which fires explosive rounds that can be triggered remotely. He has regenerative health and no longer needs to look for health packs. He can breathe underwater, allowing him to reach hidden areas that he could not reach before. Also another whole class of Intel are hidden throughout the levels. Collecting all of the "infected" intel unlocks plasma grenades and an expanded story. Infected mode ends when the player quits the game.

Infected mode is available from start on the PlayStation 4 and PlayStation 5 versions.

=== Multiplayer ===
Resistance: Retribution features 5 game modes in the online section: deathmatch, Team Deathmatch, Containment, Capture the Flag and Assimilation. In Containment, both teams must fight to keep coolant nodes under their control, whoever holds the most for the longest wins (similar to Meltdown from Resistance: Fall of Man). In Assimilation one player starts out as a Cloven, the other seven are Maquis. The Cloven player has to hunt down the remaining Maquis. The Maquis cannot kill the cloven, the objective is to survive the longest. Any Maquis killed by the cloven become cloven when they respawn. Online features all the weapons found in the single player campaign except one as well as weapon spawn point where players can pick up weapons to add to their inventory. The opposing factions will be Maquis fighters vs the Cloven.

The multiplayer was disabled by Sony on May 15, 2015, making Resistance: Burning Skies to be the only entry left in the series to have multiplayer support.

== Plot ==
Two months before the Chimera's central tower in London is destroyed and their armies are defeated in Britain, British Royal Marine Lieutenant James Grayson finds his brother Johnny partially converted into a Chimera while on a mission to destroy one of the Chimeran conversion centres. Grayson reluctantly follows protocol regarding infected soldiers, and kills Johnny, but this causes him to suffer a nervous breakdown and he deserts his troops, leading his own personal vendetta against the Chimera. After destroying 26 conversion centres, Grayson is captured by the British and put to trial for capital crimes, where he is sentenced to death for desertion. The night before his execution, Grayson is visited by Lieutenant Raine Bouchard, a member of the European mainland resistance movement known as the "Maquis", who offers Grayson a reprieve in exchange for his aid and knowledge on conversion centres. Grayson is initially reluctant, but is more interested when he learns that Bouchard and her father are developing a serum to counteract the Chimera virus. Grayson agrees to the deal, though he demands his brother's jacket as an extra condition, and is released as a mercenary contracted to the Maquis.

The "Maquis" and the British forces, including Grayson, plan "Operation Overstrike", where they will enter Europe through Rotterdam, in the Netherlands, travel through Bonn, Germany, and into Luxembourg to help secure the Maquis stronghold there, and ultimately moving onto the main Chimera tower in Paris, France. Though they suffer many casualties from coastal Chimera gun towers, the forces are able to successfully make it to Bonn. Bouchard takes Grayson and the Maquis commander Colonel Roland Mallery on a special mission to investigate a new type of conversion center in Bonn. The group is separated, with Bouchard falling into the initial stages of the conversion process, but Grayson is able to rescue her, believing her to be yet unaffected, and then destroys the facility. The troops learn that the Chimera have discovered the Maquis base in Luxembourg and race to defend the base long enough to evacuate the personnel to their last stronghold in Reims, France. Dr. Bouchard insists on staying to complete one last experiment, and as Grayson attempts to evacuate, he comes to learn that Bouchard herself was infected, purposefully, at the conversion center in Bonn to allow her father to gain a sample of the virus as to develop a serum. However, before the serum can be created, Dr. Bouchard is killed by the invading Chimera forces, but Bouchard is able to finish her father's work and gains a sample. Bouchard and Grayson are forced to evacuate as the base falls to the Chimera.

In Reims, Grayson attempts to warn Mallery and the British about Bouchard's infection, but Mallery instead locks him up, considering the act to be treasonous. While in the makeshift brig, Grayson is visited by Bouchard, who seduces Grayson into having sex with her, before she leaves on her mission to take the serum to the Paris tower. After Mallery and Bouchard leave, Grayson is freed by his former commander, British Major Steven Cartwright, and Colonel Rachel Parker from the brig, and given a second sample of the serum to take to the tower in case Bouchard fails. As he travels to Paris via old catacombs, Grayson comes across thousands of dead and mutilated female bodies awaiting to be converted by the Chimera: Grayson realizes just how selfish he has been in his vendetta against the Chimera, and leaves his brother's jacket behind while continuing on the mission.

Grayson encounters Mallery as he nears the tower and discovers that he has also already been infected by the virus and is purposefully preventing him from reaching the tower. Grayson manages to kill Mallery and continues into the tower itself and the lair of the Chrysalis, the being believed to be controlling the Chimera. After using the serum, he discovers the Chrysalis herself, revealed to be Bouchard who has now been fully converted into a Chimera. Grayson manages to defeat the monster she has become: as it dies, Bouchard's human self resurfaces and warns Grayson that the serum is only a temporary measure, as the Chimera have evolved a more advanced method of converting humans, and that they are already developing new ways to recover from their losses: she also remarks that the Chimera have already conquered worlds beyond Earth, and they are simply too evolved to defeat. As the virus consumes her utterly, Grayson kills Bouchard to put her out of her misery.

With the Chrysalis destroyed, the British and Maquis forces are able to destroy the Paris tower and free Western Europe from the Chimera. After memorializing Bouchard's death, Parker and Cartwright offers Grayson a commission with the British Army as a major, and returns his brother's jacket to him, encouraging him to keep it instead of placing it at Bouchard's memorial. Grayson declines Parker's commission, instead enlisting as a colonel in the Maquis. Grayson leads a Maquis force into the heart of Russia to discover the source of the Chimera invasion, but Grayson goes Missing in action during the battle to liberate Warsaw, though rumors spread of a British soldier in Russia that has become known as the "Cloven Killer". The last scene shows Grayson standing before Saint Basil's Cathedral before turning around after the end credits; revealing his eyes now golden yellow, a symptom of having been infected by the Chimera virus.

== Reception ==
Reception

Aggregate score
Aggregator	Score
Metacritic	81/100

Review scores
Publication	Score
Destructoid	6.5/10
Edge	6/10
Eurogamer	8/10
Famitsu	32/40
Game Informer	8.75/10
GamePro	4/5
GameRevolution	B+
GameSpot	8.5/10
GameSpy	3.5/5
GameTrailers	9.4/10
GameZone	9/10
Giant Bomb	4/5
IGN	(US) 9.2/10 (UK) 7/10
PlayStation: The Official Magazine	4.5/5
411Mania	7/10

Resistance: Retribution received generally favorable reviews, according to the review aggregation website Metacritic. GameTrailers praised the presentation and gameplay and also awarded the game their Best PSP Game of 2009 title. GamePro reviewer Heather Bartron praised the game's cover mechanics for evading enemy fire and the game's well-placed checkpoints and level designs. Bartron wrote the game would appeal to both casual and experienced gamers, although she disliked the repetitiveness near the end and that most of the game's elements were left unchanged from the previous titles. In Japan, Famitsu gave it a score of all four eights for a total of 32 out of 40.
