= Call of Duty: Roads to Victory =

2007 video game

- Developer: Amaze Entertainment
- Publisher: Activision
- Designer: Chris Brockett
- Writer: Eric D. Gingrich
- Series: Call of Duty
- Platforms: PlayStation Portable; PlayStation Vita
- Release: March 13, 2007: PlayStation Portable; NA: March 13, 2007; EU: March 30, 2007; AU: March 30, 2007; PlayStation Vita; WW: November 13, 2012
- Genre: First-person shooter
- Modes: Single-player, multiplayer

Call of Duty: Roads to Victory is a 2007 World War II first-person shooter for the PlayStation Portable. It was released on March 13, 2007, developed by Amaze Entertainment and published by Activision.

== Gameplay ==
=== Campaign ===
In campaign mode several missions are available, throughout World War II. There are 3 campaigns throughout the game: American, Canadian, and the British. The American missions are Operation Market Garden, Operation Avalanche, and Operation Detroit. The Canadian missions are the Battle of the Scheldt, Operation Infatuate, and Operation Blockbuster. The British missions are Operation Market Garden and Operation Varsity. Although there are 14 levels total, each take place during a certain mission from World War II.

=== Multiplayer ===
In multiplayer, up to 6 players may play wirelessly via ad hoc, in nine different maps. Game types are Deathmatch, Team Deathmatch, Capture the Flag, Hold the Flag, and King of the Hill.

== Development ==
Roads to Victory is the first and only game in the Call of Duty franchise made for the PlayStation Portable. A free voucher code for the game was included with purchase of Call of Duty: Black Ops: Declassified, allowing the game to be played on the PlayStation Vita.

== Reception ==
Reception

Aggregate scores
Aggregator	Score
GameRankings	65%
Metacritic	64/100

Review scores
Publication	Score
GameSpot	6.2/10
GameSpy	2.5/5

Roads To Victory received mixed reviews. IGN rated it 6.6 out of 10 and GameSpot scored it 6.2 out of 10. GameSpy noted that the artificial intelligence in the game was "unimpressive" and "laughable", noting that despite the game initially having a "great presentation" that it was only "mediocre", scoring it 2.5 out of 5.

Roads to Victory has been criticized for some glitches. The Age commented that these glitches "tend to mar the experience at times, such as all the architecture vanishing in a blur or suddenly finding yourself stuck on the corner of an object for no obvious reason". The game's control scheme has also been criticized, with the Courier Mail stating that "the big drawback of the game is the clumsy control scheme, which has the buttons doing the work of the arrows and vice versa."

== Bibliography ==
- Kempshall, C. (2015). The First World War in Computer Games. Springer Publishing. p. 118. ISBN 9781137491763.
