= Resistance (video game series) =

- Logo as seen on top of the cover art for the first game
- Genres: First-person shooter; Third-person shooter
- Developers: Insomniac Games (main series); Bend Studio (Retribution); Nihilistic Software (Burning Skies)
- Publisher: Sony Computer Entertainment
- Creator: Insomniac Games
- Platforms: PlayStation 3; PlayStation Portable; PlayStation Vita
- First release: Resistance: Fall of Man; November 17, 2006
- Latest release: Resistance: Burning Skies; May 29, 2012

Resistance is a series of first-person shooter and third-person shooter video games developed by Insomniac Games and published by Sony Computer Entertainment for the PlayStation 3, PlayStation Portable and PlayStation Vita video game consoles. The series takes place in an alternate history 1950s, in which an alien civilization known as the Chimera have invaded and conquered Earth, expanding their armies by capturing humans and transforming them into monster-like super soldiers to fight for them. The player takes the role of one of the remaining human armed forces as they fight against the Chimera invasion. The series is noted for its use of both conventional and futuristic weaponry, reflecting Insomniac's previous work on the Ratchet & Clank series.

== Games ==
Aggregate review scores
Game	Metacritic
Resistance: Fall of Man	86/100
Resistance 2	87/100
Resistance 3	83/100

=== Main series ===
==== Resistance: Fall of Man (2006) ====
Resistance: Fall of Man is the first installment in the Resistance trilogy and was released on the PlayStation 3 in 2006 as a launch title for the system. The game is about the Americans and the British who join forces to stop an extraterrestrial species known as the Chimera from taking over the United Kingdom in 1951.

==== Resistance 2 (2008) ====
Resistance 2 is the second installment in the Resistance trilogy and was released on the PlayStation 3 in November 2008. The game's protagonist is Nathan Hale. It is set in 1953, shortly after the events of the first game. The Chimera have managed to cross over into North America and threaten to take over the continent.

==== Resistance 3 (2011) ====
Resistance 3 is the third and final installment in the Resistance trilogy and was released on the PlayStation 3 on September 6, 2011. The protagonist is Joseph Capelli, a character that was introduced in the previous game. It is set in 1957 and again takes place in the United States in cities like New York City and St. Louis, Missouri. It also drops the military aspect of the previous games and is post-apocalyptic instead. This is also the last Resistance game to be made by Insomniac Games, as confirmed by its CEO Ted Price.

=== Other games ===
Aggregate review scores
Game	Metacritic
Resistance: Retribution	81/100
Resistance: Burning Skies	60/100

==== Resistance: Retribution (2009) ====
Resistance: Retribution was released on the PlayStation Portable on March 17, 2009. Set after the events of Fall of Man, the game follows James Grayson, a British Royal Marine first mentioned in Resistance 2, as he helps the human resistance force in Europe to retake the continent from the Chimera in 1951.

==== Resistance: Burning Skies (2012) ====
Resistance: Burning Skies was released on the PlayStation Vita on May 29, 2012. The game follows the story of Tom Riley, a firefighter who sets out to find his family while fighting the Chimera, who have now taken over the American east coast.

=== Future ===
According to Resistance 3 creative director Marcus Smith, the studio has a number of franchises it wants to pursue and that Resistance is not one of them. Insomniac CEO Ted Price said that Insomniac "won't be making any more Resistance games". All online features of the Resistance games have been discontinued in March 2014. In August 2018, Insomniac's community director James Stevenson called chances of a Resistance 4 "a longshot" revealing that neither the developer, nor Sony who owns the IP, were talking about a sequel. In June 2021, game developer and former IGN PlayStation editor Colin Moriarty revealed his contacts at Insomniac had pitched a sequel to Sony, but it was rejected due to the number of post-apocalyptic games in development, including The Last of Us and Days Gone. The series was celebrated with numerous other PlayStation franchises in the PlayStation 5 game Astro's Playroom.

== Setting ==
The alternate history of the Resistance series diverges from current history primarily at the end of World War I, leading to the formation of the European Trade Organization, a continental peacekeeping alliance, and worldwide peace, preventing the Great Depression, the rise of the Nazi Germany, and World War II, but also leading to Franklin Delano Roosevelt losing the 1940 presidential election to Montana Senator Noah Grace who leads the U.S. into a semi-totalitarian isolationist state, as well as the rise of an isolationist Russian Empire, as before his abdication, Nicholas II appointed his youngest brother Grand Duke Mikhail as Tsar, who crushed the Russian Revolution.

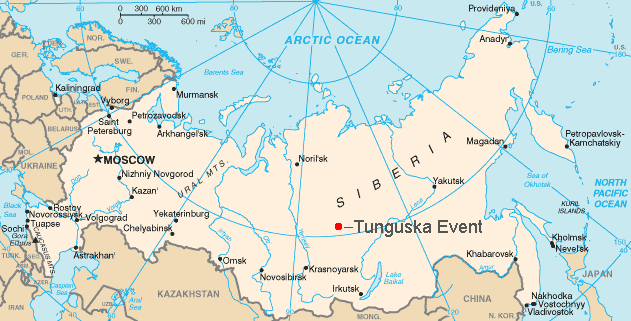
Approximate location of the Tunguska event, in Siberia

A new menace arises from Siberia, with the epicenter corresponding to the time and location of the Tunguska Event of 1908. In 1921, Russia initiated a communications blackout with the rest of the world and built a wall against its European border called the "Red Curtain." Word spreads of small towns, villages, and eventually cities in Russia and Eastern Europe that are destroyed within a single night. A strange cold front also develops over Russia and spreads outwards. European intelligence agencies attempt to listen in on Russian radio stations, only to hear a single message repeated over and over: "Brotherhood, Strength, and Fortitude ... in the face of the angry night".

In December 1949, the Red Curtain is suddenly breached by numerous Chimeran forces. The Chimera overrun continental Europe in just two months, leaving very few survivors. The Chimera then proceed to dig underneath the English Channel, invading Britain in late 1950. The bulk of the British forces is wiped out, with the rest fleeing to scattered bases in the northern parts of England.

Sometime after the invasion of England, the SRPA (Special Research Projects Administration) begins experimenting with the virus, supposedly to find a cure. It is never revealed whether they are attempting to find a cure for the virus or simply attempting to create a group of superhumans. This project is known as Project Abraham.

There are only two known locations where Project Abraham took place. One was an unspecified military facility in Alaska, and another in Bryce Canyon, Utah. Out of the viral website, it is known that the only survivors are Joseph Capelli and Nathan Hale, and they are both later transferred to Sentinel Squad Echo.

After the events of Project Abraham, the soldiers who were infected with the Chimeran virus were formed into an elite squad known as Sentinels.

== Gameplay ==
The Resistance games play similarly to most first-person shooters, and feature a variety of weapons. The weapons include both conventional weapons for the setting of the game, weapons created by the Chimera that possess unique features, and human weapons that have been modified to take advantage of the Chimera technology. Each weapon features two modes of fire which work in conjunction with each other. The human assault rifles include grenade launchers, while the Chimera "Bullseye" has a secondary mode that fires a marker, such that all bullets shot in the primary mode will strike the marked target for a short time.

The main trilogy on PlayStation 3 featured large-scale multiplayer modes with support for up to 60 players in Resistance 2 and up to 40 players in Resistance: Fall of Man. Gameplay was reduced to smaller matches in Resistance 3. All three console games offer extensive stat tracking for online combat, and Resistance 2 even requires online play to unlock some of its trophies.

== Other media ==
Resistance: The Gathering Storm, a novel by William C. Dietz, was released in April 2009. It details what happened to Nathan Hale during the two years between the events that unfolded in Iceland, after his extraction from Great Britain, and later in San Francisco and where the Chimera launch the invasion of the United States.

Resistance: A Hole in the Sky, an indirect sequel to The Gathering Storm, was written by William C. Dietz. It is set before the events of Resistance 3.

Resistance, a six-issue comic book limited series, began in January 2009. The first issue, "Resistance #0" (which was available as part of the Resistance 2 Collector's Edition), details the early history of Private Jordan Adam Shepherd, the seemingly innocent soldier who volunteered to be a test subject in Project Abraham, and, due to the machinations of Doctor Fyodor Malikov, would transform into "Daedalus", the Leader of the Chimera. Another comic issue released was called "Metastasis", telling the tale of a Nathan Hale mission and how he is to retrieve an antidote to the chimera virus.
