= Marvel Nemesis: Rise of the Imperfects =

2005 video game

- PAL region cover art for PSP. Wolverine is replaced by Captain America.
- Developers: Nihilistic Software; EA Canada (PSP); Sensory Sweep Studios (DS)
- Publisher: Electronic Arts
- Platforms: GameCube, PlayStation 2, PlayStation Portable, Nintendo DS, Xbox
- Release: September 20, 2005: PlayStation 2, GameCube, Xbox; NA: September 20, 2005; AU: October 11, 2005 (GCN); EU: October 14, 2005; AU: October 14, 2005 (Xbox); AU: October 17, 2005 (PS2) PlayStation Portable; NA: October 4, 2005; AU: October 14, 2005; EU: October 28, 2005 Nintendo DS; NA: October 11, 2005; EU: October 28, 2005; AU: October 31, 2005
- Genre: Fighting
- Modes: Single-player, multiplayer

Marvel Nemesis: Rise of the Imperfects is a fighting game for the PlayStation 2, Xbox, GameCube, Nintendo DS, and PlayStation Portable, which ties into the Marvel Nemesis comic book series. Developed by Nihilistic Software and EA Canada for consoles, EA Canada's Team Fusion division for PlayStation Portable, and Sensory Sweep Studios for DS, and published by Electronic Arts, the game was released in North America in September 2005 and in PAL territories in October 2005. The game focuses on Marvel Comics characters facing a new team of super villains known as The Imperfects. Upon release, the game received mixed to negative reviews from critics. A sequel, Marvel Chaos, was announced in 2007, and was to be developed by EA Chicago for PlayStation 3 and Xbox 360, but was cancelled the following year.

== Gameplay ==
The game pitches a series of Marvel heroes and villains, including Venom, Wolverine, Iron Man, and Spider-Man against a series of original characters. Combat is simplified in favor of allowing the player greater movement, and the game initially drew comparisons to Power Stone, Super Smash Bros. and Ehrgeiz as a result. The game featured Fatality-like finishing moves that could be triggered as soon as an opponent's health falls to 25% or lower.

The game also features online multiplayer on the PlayStation 2 and Xbox. The online servers were shut down on September 1, 2007

== Plot summary ==
As heroes battle invading aliens, Daredevil in distress calls Elektra for help. She finds him on the Daily Bugle building, where he fights her. She defeats him and removes an alien device from the back of his neck. This releases him from the control of Niles Van Roekel, who lets his Imperfects into the city to fight heroes. The heroes also find more alien devices and fight any "infected" to remove those devices.

Meanwhile, a girl named Maya trains to fulfill Roekel's goal to create the best and most deadly warrior. She begins by destroying different alien devices. As training continues, she takes on the name "Paragon", fighting the same aliens the heroes are. She fights her way out of the secret headquarters of the Imperfects and into the city, where Magneto finds her. So that Paragon will serve as his minion, he uses an alien device to control her. Paragon eventually breaks free of the device's control and defeats Magneto. She realizes that she is not evil and plans to stop Roekel. Roekel reveals that he is an alien, is responsible for and will spread the invasion. Maya attacks Roekel and kills him by taking away his life force. She stops the invasion, and she and the other Imperfects join to share the Earth with the heroes.

== Development ==
The game was announced in January 2004 and was initially titled Marvel vs. EA. Rise of the Imperfects was the first game from a Marvel-Electronic Arts partnership from 2004 to 2006. From July 2005 to December 2006, Marvel Comics published a six-issue comic book limited series. Written by Greg Pak and drawn by Renato Arlem, it was a tie-in and prequel to the game.

Dan Ayoub said the game was inspired by the films and the new generation of comics and wanted the game to reflect that. The Imperfects were original characters created for the series by Paul Catling. The gameplay was also inspired by games such as Power Stone, Super Smash Bros., and War of the Monsters.

Points in the video game story and the comic books directly contradict each other. The two still share the same characters and introduce the original characters with, minor details aside, the same background stories and powers. Though the story implies the original characters are part of the regular Marvel continuity, they have yet to appear elsewhere in the Marvel Multiverse.

== Characters ==
The game features 18 playable characters. These include 10 existing Marvel characters—two of which differ between the PlayStation Portable version and other versions—and the eight members of the Imperfects, marked below in italics. In addition to the playable characters, Hulk and the Punisher make brief cameo appearances in the console versions as victims of the invading Imperfects.

=== Marvel characters ===
- Captain America (Note: PSP version only)
- Daredevil (Note: Console and DS versions only)
- Doctor Doom
- Elektra
- Human Torch
- Iron Man
- Magneto
- Spider-Man
- Storm
- Thing
- Venom
- Wolverine

=== Imperfects characters ===
- Brigade
- Fault Zone
- Hazmat
- Johnny Ohm
- Niles Van Roekel
- Paragon
- Solara
- Wink

== Canceled sequel ==
A sequel, Marvel Chaos, was announced in 2007 and being developed by EA Chicago, but it was shelved after EA's partnership with Marvel ended the following year.

== Reception ==
Reception

Aggregate score
Aggregator	Score
Metacritic	PS2: 53/100; XBOX: 58/100; GC: 54/100; PSP: 58/100; DS: 34/100

Review score
Publication	Score
GameSpot	6.4/10 (PS2)

The consoles and PSP versions received "mixed or average" reviews according to the review aggregation website Metacritic, while the Nintendo DS version received "generally unfavorable reviews".

The game was criticized for its poor story mode and limited multiplayer. Many complaints about the game revolved around the fact that AI opponents would chain-abuse projectile special moves, dealing significant damage to a player character, with the AI character immediately triggering their finishing move upon dropping the player to low health. The original characters were both criticized and praised.
