= Resistance 2 =

2008 video game

- North American cover art
- Developer: Insomniac Games
- Publisher: Sony Computer Entertainment
- Director: Ted Price
- Writer: T.J. Fixman
- Composer: Boris C. Salchow
- Series: Resistance
- Platform: PlayStation 3
- Release: NA: November 4, 2008; AU: November 27, 2008; EU: November 28, 2008
- Genre: First-person shooter
- Modes: Single-player, multiplayer

Resistance 2 is a 2008 first-person shooter video game developed by Insomniac Games and published by Sony Computer Entertainment for the PlayStation 3. The game was released in North America on November 4, 2008, in Australia on November 27, 2008, and in Europe on the following day. Resistance 2 is the sequel to the best-selling PlayStation 3 launch title Resistance: Fall of Man.

Resistance 2 sees protagonist Nathan Hale travel to the United States in order to once again battle the Chimera, who have launched a full-scale invasion of both the east and west coasts. In this game, Hale is part of an elite force of soldiers called "The Sentinels", who, like him, are infected with the Chimeran virus, and must keep it under control through regular application of inhibitors.

Resistance 2 was released to generally positive reviews, with praise for its visuals, multiplayer modes and scale of the single-player campaign. However, there was some criticism of the story and aspects of the campaign, while the game's overall changes from its predecessors drew polarized reactions from critics and fans. A sequel, Resistance 3, was released in 2011. The game, along with its predecessor and sequel, had its online servers shut down on April 8, 2014. Digital versions of the first two games were released after the servers' closure, exclusively in Europe.

== Gameplay ==
Resistance 2 is a single-player campaign, with the player controlling protagonist Nathan Hale. The game includes many of the weapons from Resistance: Fall of Man, as well as new weapons such as the "Marksman" and a mini gun called the "HVAP Wraith". The weapons are a mix of 1950s human technology and more advanced alien technology. Unlike the first game, where there was no limit on the number of weapons carried, Resistance 2 limited the player to only two weapons at any given time, as well as a more limited number of grenades. Resistance 2 also does not use a health bar in the single player campaign as it did in the first, but instead it uses an automatic regenerative health system, whereby players must keep out of the line of fire in order to recover health. This system of health recovery is also common in other first-person shooters like Halo, Battlefield and Call of Duty.

=== Multiplayer ===
Resistance 2 features multiplayer in two variations. Both multiplayer modes track the player's performance, gaining experience and leading to benefits and rewards, as well as assigning the player a skill ranking.

Resistance 2 does not offer co-op for the single player campaign. Cooperative mode features a separate campaign mode set in 1952–53 in the gap in the time line of the single-player campaign. The cooperative campaign supports anything from two to eight players, taking the role of a special forces group called "Spectre Team". Players are tasked with many randomized objectives around the map, while defeating hordes of Chimera in the process. The strength of the enemy forces is altered based on the number of players and their skill levels. There are three classes to choose from: Special Ops — long-distance damage dealers, who also provide ammunition; Soldiers — the "tanks" who endure the most damage; and Medics — who drain life from enemies and impart to teammates.

Competitive mode features support for up to 60 players during the Skirmish mode; which allowed for the greatest number of players in an online PlayStation 3 game at the time of release, but was last surpassed by MAG. Five games modes are available: Deathmatch, Team Deathmatch, Core Control (Capture the Flag), Skirmish, and released via update, Meltdown. Skirmish has players getting split up into squads of five and take part in objective-based proxy-battles. Players can play as either the Humans or the Chimerans (but due to updates, the player can now be a Cloven, a Female Ranger, or a Ravager), and get to choose their weapon loadout before and during a game while respawning.

Many weapons make a return from the original, most notably the Carbine, Bullseye, Fareye, Auger, Rossmore and LAARK (although this can be only accessed through a berserk). However, the Arc Charger and Dragon did not return, and were instead replaced with the Bellock, Wraith, Splicer and Pulse Cannon. The addition of berserks is a new feature, and can only be accessed if the player reaches a required XP during a game through kills. The berserks give players an additional advantage such as a new weapon or added health but only for a short period of time.

There are a variety of campaign based maps featuring maps of different sizes (10p, 20p, 40p, 60p) with the player choosing their preference. Custom games also made a return, although unlike Resistance: Fall of Man, players cannot receive XP in custom games. The ranking system is also identical to that of Resistance: Fall of Man, with players progressing through 20 ranks with three tiers each from private up to supreme commander (making a total of 60 ranks). As some ranks are gained, players receive unlockables such as different berserks and skins.

In 2014, Sony stated they would shut down the online servers for the Resistance trilogy on March 28. From then on, online multiplayer would be disabled. However, the single player/story mode and offline co-op campaigns are still available to play.

== Plot ==
Following the events of the first Resistance, soldiers from the Special Research Projects Administration (SRPA), led by Major Richard Blake, take custody of Sgt. Nathan Hale. They transport him to an American black site in Iceland, but are soon shot down by Chimeran forces. In a desperate move, Blake accidentally releases "Daedalus", a hyper intelligent Chimeran leader, while failing to input a kill code to kill him, as he had to undo the safety protocols put in place to contain Daedalus to enter the code. Daedalus soon escapes and the SRPA are forced to abandon their base. Blake then explains to Hale that he is part of "Project Abraham", a covert effort to create human soldiers infused with the Chimera virus, known as Sentinels. Two years later, Hale is promoted to Lieutenant and given command of Echo Squad, consisting of Sergeant Ben Warner, Specialist Aaron Hawthorne, and Corporal Joseph Capelli.

The Chimeran invasion of the United States

On May 15, 1953, a Chimeran armada launches an invasion of the United States, overwhelming most of its remaining populated cities. Among the targets is an underwater SRPA outpost in San Francisco, where Hale is scheduled to undergo inhibitor treatment to prevent the Chimera virus completely taking him over. With Blake providing backup, Hale oversees a full evacuation and retrieves inhibitor samples for the Sentinels. The survivors retreat to the Midwest, where they track a damaged Chimeran flagship to Orick, California. Stealing an enemy transport, Hale boards the ship and steals intel while Echo Squad sets explosives to destroy it. Using the intel, they learn that the Chimera are planning to attack the SRPA's Liberty Defense Perimeter in Twin Falls, Idaho. Before the fleet can begin its assault, the Sentinels activate two defense towers, resulting in an artillery barrage that breaks the offensive. Defying orders to return for needed treatment, Hale takes a squad to "Station Genesis", a Chimeran tower in Bryce Canyon, Utah, where an SRPA expedition led by Russian doctor Fyoder Malikov has been massacred by Daedalus's troops. Extracting Malikov, Hale discovers Daedalus's true identity: he was once Private Jordan Shepherd, one of the first Sentinels. Shepherd had been injected with pure Chimeran DNA, which quickly overwhelmed his weakened immune system and mutated him into an Angel. Malikov also warns Hale that the same will eventually happen to him unless he receives treatment.

With his condition worsening, Hale orders an attack on Chicago, where the Chimera have begun to restart their network of towers. Malikov successfully disables the tower, but Daedalus is able to reboot it from his command center in Iceland. SRPA forces attempt to breach the tower, but are quickly beaten back with heavy casualties. Against Blake's order to retreat, Echo Squad enters the tower and initiates a manhunt for Daedalus, during which both Hawthorne and Warner are ambushed and killed. Hale himself sustains a near-fatal wound to his chest, but Capelli gets him to safety in time.

Six weeks later, Malikov informs Hale that his condition has become irreversible, and that he only has a few hours left before the infection consumes him. Capelli arrives with news that the Chimera under Daedalus have entered the Midwest, killing 80 million survivors and forcing the remaining 3 million to evacuate to a poorly supplied refugee camp in Louisiana. With Daedalus's army converging on the Chicxulub Crater in the Yucatan Peninsula for unknown reasons, Hale, Capelli, and Blake infiltrate his ship with a nuclear warhead, hoping to detonate it near the central reactor and trigger an explosion that wipes out the entire fleet. Unfortunately, Blake and his team are intercepted and killed by the Chimera, who take the bomb to Daedalus. Entering the core, Hale kills him via electrocution; while examining the corpse, he inadvertently absorbs Daedalus's psychokinetic abilities. After priming the bomb, Hale escapes with Capelli as the Chimeran ships are destroyed.

After their escape vessel crashes, Capelli awakens and finds Hale, fully succumbed to the Chimeran virus, gazing upon several planet-like structures floating in the sky. Realizing that he has no other choice, Capelli executes him.

== Development ==
=== Beta phase ===
Insomniac announced they were running a Public Beta in October 2008. One of the ways to give consumers access to the beta involved a pre-order program through GameStop. Gamers who reserved their copy from GameStop received a card that contained a beta registration code. Once registered through the official site, the beta voucher was emailed to the address provided. Users could then download and install their beta from the PlayStation Store. The Public Beta was available from October 24 to 29. It included three multiplayer maps – San Francisco, Orick (California), and Chicago – and could be played in the 8-player co-op campaign and the 60-player online multiplayer.

== Marketing ==
Nathan Hale as he appeared at Project Abraham.com. Played by Travis Willingham.

=== Project Abraham ===
The marketing campaign for Resistance 2 centered around an alternate reality game named Project Abraham, a top-secret military project under the jurisdiction of the U.S. Department of War.

Initially, specific details on the nature and purpose of the project were bare and mysterious, though additional content was added to the website (in concurrence with the project's latest developments) that reveals the purpose of the project. It was revealed to be a research initiative designed to eradicate the Chimera virus that is currently infecting Europeans by the millions. It lasts over the next two months, with a SRPA team of biochemical experts formulating several permutations of serums to be used on human volunteers in an attempt to discover the vaccine against the plague. The findings were ultimately inconclusive. Other purposes are to learn more about and better understand the virus. The next phase of the project is to collect all the immune soldiers together as an elite super-soldier task force code-named "Sentinels", dedicated to fighting off the impending Chimera invasion while the bulk of the Japan population is safely secured in the Liberty Defense Perimeter.

The primary characters are Colonel Grant Thompson and Doctor Cassandra "Cassie" Aklin (Katee Sackhoff, and is also the protagonist; with all written and recorded content either directed towards or generated by Aklin so far), but other characters, civilian, military, or otherwise were mentioned. The other main characters are seven soldiers who volunteered for the project from different army units, all brought together at the Project Abraham Compound in Alaska (the specific location is classified). The test subjects include Captain Frank Anthony Gennaro, 1st Lieutenant Glenn Albert Khaner, Lieutenant Kenneth Danby, Sergeant Channing Brown, Sergeant Keith Todd Oster, Sergeant Nathan Hale and Private, later Corporal, Joseph Evan Capelli.

Apart from the project itself, the files and videos reveal the personal situation with the project's personnel; the soldiers, willing to endure the possibility of death, have detailed history, military careers, and personality profiles (collected by Aklin), which is often reflected in their actions towards others. More information about Hale's history, family, and military career are revealed as well, along with allusions to a romantic relationship between Hale and Cassie.

=== Other websites ===
A second website named America first America only is the website of an organization called the "Alliance For American Autonomy". The Alliance is a group of radicals bent on exposing the U.S. Government and its secrets to the public. The site shows a small dark area with a printing press, and an office containing a news board, news clippings, the alliances newsletter/paper, file cabinets, and a "tip box". The Alliances newsletter/paper is published every Friday. When a new article is posted the old ones are stored in the file cabinets for reference and can be viewed at any time. The newsletter/paper gets most of its information from "agents," people who have submitted SrpaNet codes through the Tip Box. A recent update for the site has seemed to have ransacked the area and shows a letter that seems to have been written in a hurry. The latest updates show a typewriter with various American cities listed on it. When a "dead-drop" has been reported in a city, fans may go to the given location to retrieve a canvas bag containing a personal item of one of the Project Abraham participants, a compass, a SRPA T-shirt, and a card listing a serial number. This serial number is used to unlock two comic panels at the second new addition to the AFAO website, Metastasis.

A third website named Get A War Job has been discovered and can be accessed directly from Project Abraham. On the site a typewriter is shown along with pro and anti-war posters, cards, pamphlets, and a document which the player can fill out and possibly cause events to happen in the future such as a phone call or further information about the site/sites. The business card to the left may be called, toll free, to hear an inspirational recruiting message for the military. The latest update for the site seems to have burned nearly everything in view and the registration form is no longer available.

A fourth website named SrpaNet has also been discovered. It is an old computer interface used by the Project Abraham staff and the U.S. Government. So far hidden and overt serial codes, found in various places on Project Abraham, have led to hidden documents and images relating to the Chimera and what is known about them.

=== Collector's Edition ===
The collector's edition includes a hardcover art book, special cover art, an in-game weapon skin (a Chimeran HVAP Wraith called the Brute Minigun, the same kind Ravagers use), and an action figure of the game's "Hybrids", the Chimera. It also includes a bonus Blu-ray Disc with a behind-the-scenes featurette, a video detailing the game's alternate historical timeline, a digital copy of issue #0 of the Resistance comic book, and a preview from the upcoming Resistance novel "The Gathering Storm". The collector's edition was only sold in North America, and not in Europe due to the hassle of translating each aspect of the Collector's Edition to the various main languages in the continent, such as English, French, Spanish etc. as said by SCEE in a Press Conference prior to the game's release. The Collector's Edition Blu-ray also contains a hidden Easter Egg which can be accessed by watching the "scale" featurette, pressing Left on the arrow keys upon returning to the menu, and then pressing right.

== PlayStation Home ==
On March 26, 2009, Insomniac Games released a Resistance 2 SRPA suit for the male avatars. The SRPA suit is purchasable in Home's shopping complex.

On May 21, 2009, Insomniac Games released a dedicated space for Resistance 2 in the PlayStation 3's online community-based service, PlayStation Home in the Asian, European, and North American versions. The space is called the "Resistance Station" and is modeled after the Chicago level in Resistance 2 and features a video screen showing the trailers for Resistance 2 (Asian Home) and Resistance: Retribution (North American Home) as well as a mini game titled 'Four Barrels of Fury' in which users takes control of a turret that appears as a turret version of the game's HVAP Wraith. The player must shoot down incoming Chimeran ships varying in size. The game is divided into waves. The player must shoot down ships for points. Occasionally the player must defend 2 incoming VTOL transports one carrying health the other carrying modified ammo. If the VTOLs are defended the player's turret is repaired and the damage dealt by the turret's shots will be strengthened as long as the ammo lasts. There are three different rewards for reaching a certain wave or score in the mini-game. The first reward is a male and female Resistance 2 T-shirt for beating Wave 4. If users beat Waves 1 to 4 with a score of 100% on each wave, they get a hat that is modeled after the Chimeran flagship in Wave 4 and if users obtain a score of 1,000,000, they get a male and female Resistance 2 hoodie. For a limited time in the European Home, in the place of where the video screen is in the Asian and North American versions, there was a poster with a promotional code on it. The first 3,000 users that redeemed the code received a male and female Resistance: Retribution T-shirt. The trailer for Resistance: Retribution has replaced the poster. This space was released to the Japanese version on September 10, 2009. Outso developed the Resistance 2 Game Space for Insomniac Games.

In addition to the space, users can fully game launch into Resistance 2. Game launching lets users set up a competitive or co-op game in Home, have people join the game, then launch directly from Home into the game. Users can set up a competitive game of up to 32 players and up to 8 players for co-op.

== Reception ==
Reception

Aggregate score
Aggregator	Score
Metacritic	87/100

Review scores
Publication	Score
Destructoid	7.5/10
Edge	6/10
Eurogamer	9/10
Famitsu	33/40
Game Informer	8.5/10
GamePro	4/5
GameRevolution	B+
GameSpot	9/10
GameSpy	4.5/5
GameTrailers	9.1/10
GameZone	9/10
Giant Bomb	4/5
IGN	(US) 9.5/10 (AU) 9.3/10 (UK) 8.2/10
PlayStation: The Official Magazine	4/5
The A.V. Club	B
Wired	9/10

Awards
Publication	Award
IGN	Best Shooting Game on PlayStation 3 of E3 2008; Best Multiplayer Experience on PlayStation 3 of E3 2008; Best Shooter on PlayStation 3 of 2008; Best Online Multiplayer on PlayStation 3 of 2008
GameTrailers	Best Online Game of E3 2008; Best First-Person Shooter of E3 2008; Best First-Person Shooter of 2008
GameSpot	Most Improved Sequel of 2008

Resistance 2 received "generally favorable reviews" according to the review aggregation website Metacritic.

PlayStation Official Magazine – UK said the game was, as they would have liked, "prettier and shootier". IGN, in particular praised the game for its single player campaign and online multiplayer, as well as the scale and detail of the level design, stating that the bosses would "make your jaw drop." Game Informer said that it wasn't as good as the original, "the slower movement is noticeable" and "the lack of a weapon wheel limits strategy," but praised the "absolutely gorgeous" graphics and the variety of multiplayer modes. In Japan, Famitsu gave it a score of three eights and one nine for a total of 33 out of 40.

411Mania gave it a score of 9.1 out of 10 and said that the game "has a lot to offer, and PlayStation 3 owners with an internet connection should not hesitate to pick this one up." Wired gave it a score of nine stars out of ten and said, "While it gives players that quintessential amped-up FPS experience, it isn't doing anything especially innovative or new. The firefights are intense, the pacing will keep you on the edge of your seat and quite a few scenes prove absolutely breathtaking, but the game's chief strength is the story that binds it all together, and the multiplayer modes that should keep us amused for quite some time." The A.V. Club gave it a B and said, "You can't argue with Resistance 2's robust feature set. But the once-relatable, ragtag protagonist Nathan Hale has been transformed into a generic square-jawed action hero, the kind who's been the subject of satire since 1991's Duke Nukem. Clearly Nathan isn't just battling the Chimeran virus; he's also suffering from a severe case of John McClane-itis." However, Variety gave it an average review, calling it "a much improved but still significantly flawed sequel to the disappointing 2006 original. The massive, deep and accessible online multiplayer modes will appeal to a core group of fans, but the miserable single-player campaign leaves Resistance 2 as more of a party barge than the flagship Sony needs."

Despite the widespread praise from critics, some fans were not as enthusiastic about the game, primarily complaining about changes and exclusions perceived as unnecessary, as well as a campaign mode which lacked local co-op and was argued to be inferior to that of its predecessor. Senior community manager James Stevenson of Insomniac said that the game "was a failure" for the hardcore followers of the series and admitted that gamers' negative feedback had weighed on him. Insomniac stated that they would take this as a lesson for the development of its sequel. Insomniac CEO Ted Price similarly accepted that some of the changes to the core mechanics of the franchise had surprised players and may have not been a good thing.

During the 12th Annual Interactive Achievement Awards, the Academy of Interactive Arts & Sciences nominated Resistance 2 for "Outstanding Achievement in Visual Engineering".

Resistance 2 sold 598,000 units in North America through 2008, 200,000 units in the United Kingdom, and 58,432 in Japan, which was about 409,270 copies worldwide in its debut week. As of January 2012, the game has sold more than 3 million units worldwide.

== Sequel ==
Resistance 3 was officially announced at Sony's Gamescom 2010 press conference on August 17, 2010, after a billboard ad was spotted in Shreveport, Louisiana almost a year earlier. A trailer for the game was also shown during the conference. A trailer with gameplay was shown at the 2010 Spike Video Game Awards event on December 11, 2010. Resistance 3 was released on September 6, 2011.
