= NStigate Games =

Video game developer (1998–2012)

nStigate Games
- Formerly: Nihilistic Software (1998–2012)
- Industry: Video games
- Founded: March 1998; 28 years ago
- Defunct: 2012; 14 years ago
- Headquarters: Marin County, California
- Products: Vampire: The Masquerade – Redemption
- Website: nihilistic.com

nStigate Games (formerly known as Nihilistic Software) was an American video game developer based in Novato, California.

== History ==
Nihilistic was founded in March 1998 by Ray Gresko, Robert Huebner, and Steve Tietze. Gresko and Huebner had formerly worked at LucasArts, and Tietze had worked at Rogue Entertainment. Many of Nihilistic's employees were drawn from LucasArts, working on games such as Jedi Knight.

The first game produced by Nihilistic was Vampire: The Masquerade - Redemption, set in a role-playing world created by White Wolf. Released in 2000, Vampire: The Masquerade - Redemption was published by Activision for Microsoft Windows and Apple Macintosh computers.

For their next project, Nihilistic began to develop StarCraft: Ghost, supervised by StarCraft creator Blizzard Entertainment. In mid-2004, Nihilistic ceased working on StarCraft: Ghost, amid delays caused by poor coordination between Blizzard executives and Nihilistic developers. The project was taken up by Swingin' Ape Studios, which was later bought by Blizzard. Finally in March 2006, Blizzard Entertainment announced that StarCraft: Ghost was placed on indefinite hold.

Meanwhile, in 2005, Nihilistic completed development on Marvel Nemesis: Rise of the Imperfects, a fighting game based on Marvel Comics' various superheroes. Marvel Nemesis: Rise of the Imperfects was published by Electronic Arts, for the PlayStation 2, Xbox and GameCube.

Nihilistic released their first 'next-gen' title, Conan for both the PlayStation 3 and Xbox 360 game consoles. According to a preview article in the March 2007 issue of Game Informer, Conan is an action/adventure game based on Robert E. Howard's famous sword and sorcery hero, Conan the Barbarian. This title was released by the publisher THQ on October 23, 2007.

In the fall of 2009, Konami published Nihilistic Software's first downloadable game, Zombie Apocalypse on Xbox Live for the Xbox 360 and on the PlayStation Network for the PlayStation 3. Zombie Apocalypse is multiplayer, arcade-style dual stick shooter with zombies as the opponent.

They developed PlayStation Move Heroes for the PlayStation 3 (for the PlayStation Move) which was released in March 2011.

On May 29, 2012, Nihilistic released Resistance: Burning Skies for the PlayStation Vita.

On October 17, 2012, Nihilistic reorganized their business to focus on mobile gaming, changing their name to nStigate.

On November 13, 2012, nStigate released Call of Duty: Black Ops – Declassified for the Vita. The game was panned critically for poor design and crippling technical problems.

The company announced that they'd began to restructure the studio once more and announced that they’d be focusing on developing digital and mobile titles, yet due to the failure of Declassified the company was unable to reach any agreements with major companies and would be forced to close the following month.

== Games ==
Game title	Release	Platform	Metacritic	Notes
Vampire: The Masquerade – Redemption	2000	Microsoft Windows, Apple Macintosh	74/100	
Marvel Nemesis: Rise of the Imperfects	2005	PlayStation 2, Xbox, GameCube	53/100 (PS2), 58/100 (Xbox), 54/100 (GameCube)	
Conan	2007	PlayStation 3, Xbox 360	69/100	
Zombie Apocalypse	2009	PlayStation 3, Xbox 360	61/100 (PS3), 66/100 (Xbox 360)	
PlayStation Move Heroes	2011	PlayStation 3 (PlayStation Move)	53/100	
Resistance: Burning Skies	2012	PlayStation Vita	60/100	
Call of Duty: Black Ops: Declassified	2012	PlayStation Vita	33/100	
