= Resistance: Burning Skies =

2012 video game

- North American cover art
- Developer: Nihilistic Software
- Publisher: Sony Computer Entertainment
- Composers: Kevin Riepl; Jason Graves
- Series: Resistance
- Platform: PlayStation Vita
- Release: NA: May 29, 2012; AU: May 31, 2012; EU: June 1, 2012
- Genre: First-person shooter
- Modes: Single-player, multiplayer

Resistance: Burning Skies is a 2012 first-person shooter video game developed by Nihilistic Software and published by Sony Computer Entertainment for the PlayStation Vita. It is a spin-off and the most recent installment of the Resistance series as of 2026. In the game, players control the character of Tom Riley, a firefighter who fights against an enemy called the Chimera during their invasion of the United States.

== Premise ==
On August 14, 1951, one month after the liberation of the United Kingdom, the Chimera invade the East Coast of the United States. New York fireman Tom Riley is caught in the middle of the conflict. In spite of the fact that he fights against the Chimera, he only has a desire to find and rescue his family caught in the middle of the invasion.

== Plot ==
The story begins with Tom Riley, along with Engine 174, driving through Staten Island. They arrive at a power station that is in flames. They enter the station and Tom is separated from his fellow firemen after accidentally falling into the lower levels of the station through a broken floor. As Tom works his way back up, he sees one of the firemen being attacked and killed by Longlegs. Tom is forced to fight his way out of the station and rescue one of his fellow firemen.

Once outside, Tom learns that the Chimeran invasion is in full swing. Riley then makes his way through the city, eventually picking up a broadcast asking him to assist with the evacuation. Tom follows the directions given by the broadcast, eventually meeting up with a woman named Ellie Martinez, the leader of the self-titled "Minutemen". With the support of Ellie and her ally Mac, Tom fights his way to a highway bridge where Tom reunites with his wife, Natalie, and daughter, Rachel.

Tom sends his family to safety, promising to find them. As more Chimera show up, Riley is forced to stay behind with Ellie to buy the survivors some time. Along the way, Tom and Ellie come across a mysterious shipment in a military truck called Gray Tech, which demonstrates the capabilities of upgrading their weapons. It is revealed that the shipment was being sent to Richard Gorrell. They are again attacked by Chimeran ground forces but Tom and Ellie defeat them. Before they could leave the highway however, an Executioner attacks them. Tom and Ellie are able to destroy the Executioner and escape from bombardment of Spires and Crawlers.

They make their way to a military base in Bayonne, New Jersey, where Ellie introduces Tom to her ally Colonel George Amherst, who notifies Tom that his family has been sent to a Protection Camp in Union City. Immediately after, the Chimera ambush the base. Riley assists in fending off the attack, which includes saving a wounded soldier, and killing a gargantuan Chimeran creature called the Abomination.

As Tom and Ellie progress towards Ellis Island, they sight some Chimeran reinforcements traveling along the George Washington Bridge. Ellie calls in an air strike in an effort to eliminate the reinforcements. Unfortunately, a VTOL crashes on the bridge, but it is too late to call the air strike off. Tom drops onto the bridge and begins to make his way to the crashed VTOL's crew. After searching the destroyed VTOL, Tom discovers an injured soldier trapped inside the VTOL. Tom rescues the soldier, and reunites with Ellie. Tom and Ellie then make their way to the end of the bridge, encountering Grims along the way. They eventually reach the exit, only to find that it has been sealed off by the government. As Ellie attempts to find an escape route, Tom faces off against an Impaler. Tom and Ellie jump down an emergency exit just as another air strike hits the bridge.

Tom and Ellie eventually regroup with Mac, who helps them reach Ellis Island. Tom and Ellie are ambushed by some Chimera. After clearing out all the hostiles, they eventually reach the laboratories where they reach a sealed vault door. A man contacts them asking for help. Tom and Ellie begin to fight their way to the man, only to learn that he has been infected. Once Tom kills the man, he proceeds towards Richard Gorrell's office. Tom and Ellie find a projector, which plays an instructional video. They learn that Gorrell is working on Project Phoenix, and was kidnapping several humans for testing, including Rachel and Natalie.

Tom and Ellie ride a VTOL to a protection camp in Union City, in hopes of rescuing Tom's family. Once at the camp, Tom and Ellie split up. Riley fights his way to a crashed VTOL, discovering an injured pilot. Once the pilot is saved, Tom sets out to regroup with Ellie. He fights his way through Chimeran infested mines and buildings, eventually learning the location of Natalie and Rachel. Tom catches a quick glimpse of a Chimeran carrier taking his family to a nearby conversion tower. Riley and Ellie board a floating Chimera in an effort to follow Natalie and Rachel.

Tom and Riley finally reach the conversion tower. They are separated when Ellie decides to search for Gorrell while Tom looks for his family. After clearing out several groups of Chimera, Tom eventually finds an infected Natalie. Tom performs a mercy kill on Natalie, shooting her with his carbine.

Tom eventually regroups with Rachel and Ellie; the latter proceed to help evacuate some survivors while Tom hunts down Gorrell. Once Tom finds him, Gorrell convinces Tom to trust him as he awakens an unfinished Leviathan, in an effort to show Tom his potential power over the Chimera. However, Gorrell fails to control the beast and immediately flees. Once Tom escapes, he is contacted by Ellie, who informs him that some other Minutemen have arrived. Tom confronts the Leviathan, eventually killing it.

While making his way to the tower's exit, he is ambushed by Gorrell. Tom uses his fire axe to finish Gorrell off. Tom reunites with Ellie, warning her about the desperate government and how they allowed Gorrell to proceed with Project Phoenix. After ditching all his Gray Tech, Tom parts ways with Ellie as he and Rachel walk off.

== Gameplay ==
Burning Skies has competitive eight-player online multiplayer modes. Players can choose from among six maps and three game modes — Deathmatch, Team Deathmatch, and Survival.

Burning Skies also brings back a Resistance series staple, the "weapon wheel", as well as other weapons from the series, including the Carbine, Deadeye, Auger, and Bullseye. Secondary functions of these weapons are often controlled with the Vita's touchscreen.

== Music ==
The score for Burning Skies was composed by Jason Graves and Kevin Riepl. The score for large orchestra was recorded at Ocean Way Studios in Nashville, Tennessee, in the spring of 2012. The orchestra was led and contracted by Alan Umstead of Nashville Music Scoring.

== Reception ==
Reception

Aggregate score
Aggregator	Score
Metacritic	60/100

Review scores
Publication	Score
Destructoid	2/10
Edge	4/10
Eurogamer	5/10
Famitsu	32/40
Game Informer	7/10
GameRevolution	2.5/5
GameSpot	5.5/10
GameTrailers	8.1/10
GameZone	7.5/10
IGN	5.5/10
Joystiq	1.5/5
Polygon	6.5/10
PlayStation: The Official Magazine	6/10
Digital Spy	3/5

Burning Skies received "mixed" reviews according to the review aggregation website Metacritic. Destructoid said the game "settled on being the new worst Vita game to date". Game Informer generally approved of the game's campaign and said that "as long as you're not hoping for a console-quality multiplayer experience, Burning Skies should satisfy fans". In Japan, Famitsu gave it a score of all four eights for a total of 32 out of 40.
