= Ratchet & Clank Future: Tools of Destruction =

2007 video game

- North American box art
- Developer: Insomniac Games
- Publisher: Sony Computer Entertainment
- Director: Brian Allgeier
- Writers: T.J. Fixman; Brian Hastings; Adam Moore
- Composer: David Bergeaud
- Series: Ratchet & Clank
- Platform: PlayStation 3
- Release: NA: October 23, 2007; EU: November 9, 2007; AU: November 15, 2007
- Genres: Third-person shooter, platform
- Mode: Single-player

Ratchet & Clank Future: Tools of Destruction (known as Ratchet & Clank: Tools of Destruction in most PAL countries and Ratchet & Clank Future in Japan) is a 2007 third-person shooter platform video game developed by Insomniac Games and published by Sony Computer Entertainment for the PlayStation 3. It is the fifth main installment of the Ratchet & Clank series and the first to not be released on the PlayStation 2 or PlayStation Portable. It is the first installment of the series' Future saga. It was also one of the first PlayStation 3 games to support DualShock 3 rumble without any accessories.

Tools of Destruction received critical acclaim upon release, with praise for the game's engaging gameplay and graphics, but criticism for its technical issues. The game was nominated for several awards from gaming publications and was considered a commercial success.

== Gameplay ==
Tools of Destruction retains much of the basic gameplay found in previous Ratchet & Clank games, the game being primarily a shooter-platformer. The player controls Ratchet most of the time, with some sections using Clank, as they explore various worlds to complete missions, using Ratchet's wrench and other exotic weapons gained during the course of the game. At times, Ratchet may enter free-fall, or with an upgrade to Clank, will be able to fly; during these periods, the player uses the tilt functionality of the SIXAXIS controller to maneuver Ratchet. The tilt-sensing abilities of the SIXAXIS are also used to control some weapons and gadgets.

On occasion, Cronk and Zephyr (and Talwyn on the latter two and after breaking her out of Zordoom Prison) accompany Ratchet and fight alongside him. While immune to damage, their weapons are far less potent than Ratchet's. Tools of Destruction is the first game where Ratchet, Clank and other characters converse with one another with lipsynced dialogue during gameplay, outside of cutscenes. In various stages of gameplay, Talwyn, Qwark, the Smuggler, Cronk and Zephyr also contact Ratchet by comlink. As with Going Commando, Up Your Arsenal, Deadlocked and Size Matters, there is an arena gameplay area, called the Imperial Fight Festival in this installment. The player also has the ability to pilot a ship against enemy forces in certain levels, similar to those in previous installments; however, the free-flying controls were changed to more of a rail shooter-style experience, and upgrade options for the ship are not present.

At times, the player will control Clank in a mode similar to previous games, using beings of pure energy called Zoni to fight foes, remove debris or reconstruct bridges, and to power devices in the level. Clank possesses the ability to slow down time as well during these sections, allowing him, for example, to make his way under a rapidly closing door as well as levitate.

Weapons gain experience as previously implemented in the series, but in addition, the player can collect Raritanium crystals and use them to upgrade the weapon in additional ways beyond the experience path; weapon improvements are presented in a tree-like structure and require that all previous upgrades be obtained for that weapon first before later upgrades can be purchased. The recurring R.Y.N.O series of weapons make an appearance in Tools of Destruction with the R.Y.N.O IV, which can be obtained by collecting thirteen Holo-Plan fragments hidden throughout the game.

In addition to weapons are items known as "devices". While they are selected and used similar to weapons, they may or may not directly damage foes but instead provide an effect beneficial to the player. The "Groovitron", for example, is a disco ball that causes all foes to dance for a brief time, allowing the player to deal with them while distracted. The carrying capacity of such devices are generally very low (2 or 3 units for each). Device vendors in addition to weapon vendors can be found in the game, and device ammo can be found in Raritanium chests, although these are usually hard to find.

Armor can be bought from an armor vendor on certain planets. Each upgrade to the armor decreases the amount of damage the player takes from enemy weapons. Each armor upgrade costs a large amount of bolts.

== Plot ==
On planet Kerwan, in Metropolis, Ratchet and Clank are working on a rocketsled, when they receive a distress call from Captain Qwark. After fighting through an army of heavily armed commandos attacking the city, they are confronted by Emperor Percival Tachyon, self-proclaimed "crown prince of the Cragmites”, who demands Ratchet offer his life to save the city. At the last second, the duo slip past him and escape on his private cruiser. After experiencing a deep hyper sleep, they wake up to find themselves on planet Cobalia in the Polaris galaxy. Learning that Tachyon has already conquered many neighboring planets, they decide to learn more about him. In the course of their investigation, Clank is visited by small creatures called the Zoni that only he can see. The Zoni explain that Clank was built for a special purpose, and provide him with new abilities to aid Ratchet. The duo eventually discover a remote space station in an asteroid field, where they meet Talwyn Apogee and her warbot allies Cronk and Zephyr. Talwyn explains that her father, explorer Max Apogee, was the galaxy's leading expert on Lombax technology and thus may hold the secret to their disappearance.

With their help, Ratchet learns of the Great War, a conflict between the Lombaxes and the Cragmite Empire that ended with the complete eradication of the latter; however, he also learns that the Cragmites were not killed but instead banished to a distant star, using a powerful Lombax device known as the "Dimensionator", a helmet capable of opening wormholes to other dimensions. Years later, a single Cragmite egg was recovered by miners and brought to the Lombax home world, Fastoon. Rather than destroy it, they decided to raise it as one of their own. However, when the young Tachyon learned of his true origins, he raised an army and attacked Fastoon in a genocidal campaign. Unable to defeat him, the survivors used the Dimensionator to escape, leaving behind its guardian and his young son to hide it from Tachyon. Sacrificing himself to protect his son, the guardian sent him to the planet Veldin in the Solana galaxy. Ratchet realizes that the guardian was his father and becomes determined to find the Dimensionator so that he can save his people.

Using clues left by Max Apogee, Ratchet locates the Dimensionator on planet Jasindu, defeating the Kerchu tribe sworn to protect it. The device is swiped by space pirates led by Captain Romulus Slag, but the duo pursues them and reclaims it. Captain Qwark, having escaped Tachyon's custody, then takes the Dimensionator to the Cragmite home planet, where he plans to destroy it. Before Ratchet and his friends can catch up to him however, he is recaptured by Tachyon's forces. With the Dimensionator now in his possession, Tachyon frees the Cragmites and sets out to conquer the rest of the galaxy. After a fierce battle on Fastoon, Tachyon offers Ratchet the chance to rejoin his fellow Lombaxes, but Ratchet refuses and challenges him to personal combat. The Dimensionator is damaged during the battle, opening a black hole that swallows Tachyon, and while Ratchet and Clank are able to fix it with a 3 3/4 cubits hexagonal washer they received from the Plumber, the device shuts down for good as soon as they return.

As Ratchet, Clank, and their allies gather to celebrate, the Zoni show up, now visible to everyone. Claiming that Clank is ready to learn his true purpose, they take him to another dimension, despite Ratchet's protests. As his friends gather around him, Ratchet silently vows to rescue Clank, leading into the events of Quest for Booty.

== Development ==
The game was first announced at the 2006 Game Developers Conference, where a Ratchet & Clank next-gen tech demonstration was shown for the PlayStation 3. Many new worlds and weapons were introduced into the game like in previous installments of the series. It puts less focus on the shooting aspects of the previous games, instead putting more so on the platforming sections. There are reported to be a total of 31 weapons, gadgets, and combat devices, further divided into 15 weapons, 8 gadgets, and 8 devices. Unlike Going Commando and Up Your Arsenal, the player cannot unlock weapons from previous games using a memory card due to the game not being available on the PlayStation 2.

== Reception ==
=== Critical response ===
Reception

Aggregate score
Aggregator	Score
Metacritic	89/100

Review scores
Publication	Score
1Up.com	A−
GamePro	5/5
GameRevolution	B
GameSpot	7.5/10
GameSpy	4/5
GameTrailers	9/10
IGN	9.4/10

Award
Publication	Award
Spike TV	Best PS3 Game

The game received positive reviews from critics. On Metacritic, it has received an aggregate score of 89 from 70 reviews, giving the game a ranking of "generally favorable reviews".

IGN, who gave the game a 9.4 out of 10, said "Not only has it supplanted Going Commando as the best title in the franchise, it's also the best game of any series on the PlayStation 3 thus far -- and that's saying a lot when you're up against Oblivion, Ninja Gaiden, Warhawk and Insomniac's very own previous effort, Resistance: Fall of Man." Also on IGN's weekly PS3 podcast, they called it the best video game they've played on any platform in 2007. X-Play gave it 5/5 with its own personal episode. NTSC-uk said "...it never stops being anything less than great fun to play and hugely engaging".

=== Awards ===
Tools of Destruction earned the following award nominations and wins:

- Spike TV Awards: Best PS3 Game (Won), Best Action Game .
- Gaming Target: "52 Games We'll Still Be Playing From 2007" selection.

It also placed runner-up for various awards in IGN's Best of 2007, including PS3 Game of the Year. During the 11th Annual Interactive Achievement Awards, the Academy of Interactive Arts & Sciences nominated Tools of Destruction in three categories: "Adventure Game of the Year", "Outstanding Achievement in Animation", and "Outstanding Achievement in Visual Engineering".

=== Sales ===
Tools of Destruction sold nearly 75,000 units during October 2007. While this value is lower than other previous PlayStation 3 titles (such as Warhawk and Heavenly Sword, both which broke 100,000 sales in their first month of release), the game has outsold Ratchet: Deadlocked's first month of sales by nearly 20,000 units. Sony Computer Entertainment of America stated that they were "very happy" with the initial sales figures.

== Sequel ==
A downloadable pirate-themed sequel titled Ratchet & Clank Future: Quest for Booty was released on the PSN. It is set after the events of Tools of Destruction and is much shorter than the predecessor. It is also followed by A Crack in Time, eventually ending the Future Saga with Into the Nexus.

== See also ==
- List of Sony Greatest Hits games
