= Ratchet & Clank: Up Your Arsenal =

2004 video game

- North American box art
- Developer: Insomniac Games
- Publisher: Sony Computer Entertainment
- Designer: Brian Allgeier
- Programmers: Alexander Hastings; Brian Hastings
- Artists: John Fiorito; Dave Guertin; Greg Baldwin
- Writers: Brad Santos; Oliver Wade; John Lally
- Composer: David Bergeaud
- Series: Ratchet & Clank
- Platform: PlayStation 2
- Release: NA: November 2, 2004; EU: November 12, 2004; AU: November 18, 2004
- Genres: Third-person shooter, platform
- Modes: Single-player, multiplayer

Ratchet & Clank: Up Your Arsenal (known as Ratchet & Clank 3 in Europe and Africa and Ratchet & Clank 3: Up Your Arsenal in Australia) is a 2004 third-person shooter platform video game developed by Insomniac Games and published by Sony Computer Entertainment for the PlayStation 2. It is the third installment in the Ratchet & Clank series.

The gameplay is similar to previous games in the series and introduce features such as a new control system and more levels in the upgrade system for weapons. It follows Ratchet and Clank's adventure through a fictional universe to defeat a robotic villain, Doctor Nefarious, who intends to destroy all organic life. Characters such as Doctor Nefarious and Sasha Phyronix, a Cazar starship captain who helps Ratchet throughout the game, are introduced, and a number of characters return from the original Ratchet & Clank (2002).

Up Your Arsenal is the first in the series to offer online multiplayer as well as single-player. The service was terminated for the PlayStation 2 in June 2012 and for the PlayStation 3 in February 2018. Multiplayer features three different modes of play available on all of the maps and has a selection of the weapons from the single-player game. As well as the multiplayer mode, it has many other differences compared to its predecessors such as higher quality graphics, larger worlds, and drivable vehicles. The voice cast from the previous game return as their respective characters, and new actors were hired to voice the new characters.

The game was met with critical acclaim upon release, earning an average review score of 91% at Metacritic. It was followed by a stand-alone sequel, Ratchet: Deadlocked (2005).

A high-definition remaster developed by Idol Minds for the PlayStation 3 was included as part of the Ratchet & Clank Collection in 2012, which consists of remasters of the first three games of the series originally developed for the PlayStation 2. A port of the remaster developed by Mass Media for the PlayStation Vita was released in 2014.

== Gameplay ==
Ratchet and Clank on a planet's surface. Visible are the weapon and bolt information, and a Gadgetron vendor. The player is currently equipped with a shield barrier, and wearing the Infernox armor.

Despite straying further from a classic platform game, Up Your Arsenal still offers some of the basic features of a platform game but with a strong mix of action and shooting; PGNx Media has dubbed it a "combat-platformer". As in previous games of the series, it offers melee and long range combat, and boasts a large, varied arsenal as one of its primary features.

As the player progresses through the game, new weapons and upgrades can be obtained. As well as the 20 weapons available to the player, each weapon (apart from the RY3NO) has 8 levels of strength, which differs from the previous game's 4 levels of strength. 5 upgrades are available after a weapon's purchase, and then 3 after that once the game has been completed, the player starts "Challenge Mode", and purchases the weapon's upgrade. Alongside the weapons, which are primarily used in combat, there are 10 gadgets that can be collected for use in other situations.

For most of the game the player will be in control of Ratchet, but in some areas the player takes control of Clank, Ratchet's ally. Clank can give commands to smaller robots called Gadgebots to perform tasks with the use of a command menu to solve puzzles and attack enemies. Clank also features in "Giant Clank" scenarios where Clank transforms into a larger and more advanced form and can battle similar size enemies; in this form he gains increased firepower with rockets and bombs and a large amount of health. During the single-player game, the player can also play as Captain Qwark in 2D side-scrolling levels (called "Vid Comics"), which builds upon the history of Captain Qwark and his previous conflicts with Dr. Nefarious.

The game offers a large range of enemies and different stages. It also features online multiplayer modes, such as Deathmatch, Capture the Flag, and Siege (in which the player storms the opponent's base and tries to destroy the power core inside). It supports up to eight players at a time and supports voice chat through a PlayStation 2-compatible headset. Internet connection is needed if playing online against other players.

== Plot ==
=== Characters ===
The player character and main protagonist is Ratchet, a Lombax from the planet Veldin (voiced by James Arnold Taylor). He wields a wrench as a melee weapon and can use a large arsenal of weapons. Clank, Ratchet's robotic sidekick and co-protagonist (voiced by David Kaye), is usually attached to Ratchet's back and uses special attachments to help Ratchet's movement on ground and air. Doctor Nefarious, the main antagonist of the game (voiced by Armin Shimerman), is a robotic tyrant with the intent of exterminating all organic life. At the end of the game, Nefarious is left stranded on an asteroid, eventually making cameos and reappearances in later titles of the series.

=== Plot ===
While playing chess in their penthouse in the Bogon Galaxy, Ratchet (James Arnold Taylor) and Clank (David Kaye) receive word that Ratchet's home planet, Veldin, is under attack by an army of Tyhrranoids. Posing as an officer in the Galactic Rangers, he leads an assault that drives off the invaders, who appear to use very sophisticated weapons and equipment. At a post-victory briefing, the Galactic President informs the duo that a robotic villain known as Doctor Nefarious (Armin Shimerman) is believed to be responsible for organizing the invasion. As very little is known about Nefarious, the President sends the duo to track down the only man to have ever beaten him: Captain Qwark (Jim Ward). Ratchet discovers a feral Qwark living with an indigenous tribe on planet Florana and takes him to the Starship Phoenix, where he meets Ranger Captain Sasha Phyronix (Leslie Carrara-Rudolph). Upon regaining his sanity after watching his old adventures reenacted via vid-comics, Qwark forms the "Q-Force", an "elite" squad that answers only to him, and orders Ratchet, Clank, and Q-Force operative Skidd McMarx (Neil Flynn) to infiltrate Nefarious' base on planet Aquatos. Hacking his database, Clank obtains a map of Tyhrranosis, the Tyhrranoid home world. After Ratchet succeeds in killing the Tyhrranoid queen, Doctor Nefarious sends a transmission, mocking the Q-Force; Big Al (Chris Hatfield), the technical expert of the team, traces it to a munitions factory on planet Daxx.

There, Ratchet and Clank learn that Nefarious has constructed a weapon called the Biobliterator, but they are unable to find any information on it. They also discover a music video produced by pop star Courtney Gears (Melissa Disney) (a robotic parody of Britney Spears), in which she instructs robots to destroy organic lifeforms. Clank sets up a meeting with Gears, but she renders him unconscious and turns him over to Doctor Nefarious. Aware of Clank's fame as the star of "Secret Agent Clank", Nefarious asks him to serve as the face of his plan to wipe out all organic races, but he refuses. In response, Nefarious creates an evil double named Klunk (also voiced by Kaye) and has him take Clank's place. Unaware of the deception, Ratchet undertakes a mission with Skidd to investigate enemy activity on the Obani Moons. When Ratchet returns to the Phoenix, Gears abducts Skidd and turns him into a robot. Ratchet confronts and disables her in combat, then gets Skidd to safety. Meanwhile, Sasha locates Nefarious' ship, the Leviathan, at a remote spaceport, and sends him and Qwark to apprehend the doctor. Nefarious reveals that the whole encounter is a trap, and he activates the Leviathan's self-destruct system before escaping. Qwark refuses to leave, citing the need to gather intel, and seemingly perishes when the ship explodes.

After a brief memorial for Qwark on the Phoenix, Ratchet goes to assist Ranger forces battling a Tyhrranoid invasion in the city of Metropolis. Unveiling his newly completed Biobliterator, Nefarious uses it to turn both Metropolis' citizens and his Tyhrranoid soldiers into robots. Making yet another escape, he orders Klunk to kill Ratchet. After besting the clone, Ratchet and Clank are reunited and vow to stop Nefarious. While searching the remains of the Leviathan, they find evidence that Qwark faked his death. A vid-comic hidden in Qwark's quarters on board the Phoenix reveals the location of a secret hideout where Qwark went into hiding. The duo confront him but, overcome with cowardice, he refuses to fight any longer, so they leave without him. After fighting off an attack on the Phoenix, the duo intercept the Biobliterator and Clank destroys it with an ion cannon. However, Sasha informs them that a second, more advanced, Biobliterator is being prepped for launch at Nefarious' main command center on planet Mylon. Ratchet and Clank locate Nefarious and defeat him, but he activates the Biobliterator, which transforms into a giant, heavily armed robot. Before he can crush the two, a reinvigorated Qwark flies in to distract him, giving the duo an opening to destroy the Biobliterator. Nefarious and his butler Lawrence manage to escape, but because he didn't bother to specify a destination when they engaged the teleporter, they are stranded on a distant asteroid. With Nefarious defeated, the Q-Force and their allies attend a private screening of the latest Secret Agent Clank holofilm.

== Development ==
Up Your Arsenal was the main focus of the Insomniac Games team during development. The team of around 115 people were aiming to create a new Ratchet and Clank game that would differ significantly from its predecessors and almost end up being two games in one. Insomniac believed that one of the key processes in the development process was the rigorous testing. Working closely with Sony and listening to fans of the Ratchet and Clank series, they gathered feedback and made improvements to the game. They felt that they had created a game that would appeal to a number of genres with the inclusion of elements of platform, action and side-scrolling gameplay.

At the same time, Jak 3 was being developed by Naughty Dog, a company closely tied with Insomniac. Naughty Dog's Jak and Daxter series and the Ratchet & Clank series are in similar genres; each game in both series' has been released at a similar time and both contain references to each other. Ryan Schneider, an employee of Insomniac, said, "The analogy that I like to use is that at Insomniac we like to look at it as how Tiger Woods and Michael Jordan and Kobe Bryant act when it comes to their professions. We don't really look at it as how we compare to other athletes or other games, we just try to do the best that we can and elevate the sport."

== Reception ==
Reception

Aggregate score
Aggregator	Score
Metacritic	91/100

Review scores
Publication	Score
Game Informer	10/10
GameSpot	8.7/10
GameSpy	5/5
IGN	9.6/10
Official U.S. PlayStation Magazine	5/5

Before its release, IGN was highly anticipating the final version of the game as they had played two previous versions of the game already. Concentrating on the multiplayer aspect of the game, they praised the developers for moving a solely platform game into the multiplayer genre so well. Up Your Arsenal was featured at the E3 games festival in 2004, where there was a playable demo. Only the multiplayer Siege mode and a single-player demo were available but they were enough to get 1UP.com's award for best action game at E3.

Up Your Arsenal received critical acclaim. GameSpy awarded it 5 stars out of 5, and IGN said that "You MUST buy this immediately" due to its extensive line-up of weaponry, high quality graphics and polished sound effects. IGN did, however, believe it was easier than the previous game, Going Commando (2003), while GameSpot thought that the gameplay was too similar to the previous title, but both reviewers considered these as minor issues and they made little difference to the overall score. Gaming magazines GamesTM and Official U.S. PlayStation Magazine both mentioned that the offbeat comedy that was apparent throughout the majority of the game was one of the points that made it unique. X-Play said "A mixture of excellent gameplay tweaks and new activities make the third one easily the strongest game in the series and one of the best games of this year" and giving it a full five star rating. According to Metacritic's collection of reviews, 12 separate reviewers gave the game the highest possible score. In 2006, Edge featured a "Time Extend" article on Up Your Arsenal and among other points, focused on the amount and variety of weapons available to the player. It won GameSpot's 2004 "Best Platformer" award. During the 8th Annual Interactive Achievement Awards, the Academy of Interactive Arts & Sciences nominated Up Your Arsenal for "Console Game of the Year", "Console Platform Action/Adventure Game of the Year", and outstanding achievement in "Animation", "Sound Design" and "Visual Engineering". In August 2005 Up Your Arsenal entered the Greatest Hits line-up. Since its release, it has sold over 1,150,000 copies in the U.S. alone. As of June 30, 2007, the game sold more than 3.2 million copies worldwide. IGN listed the game 18th on their list of "The Top 25 PS2 Games of All Time".
