= Brian Allgeier =

American video game designer

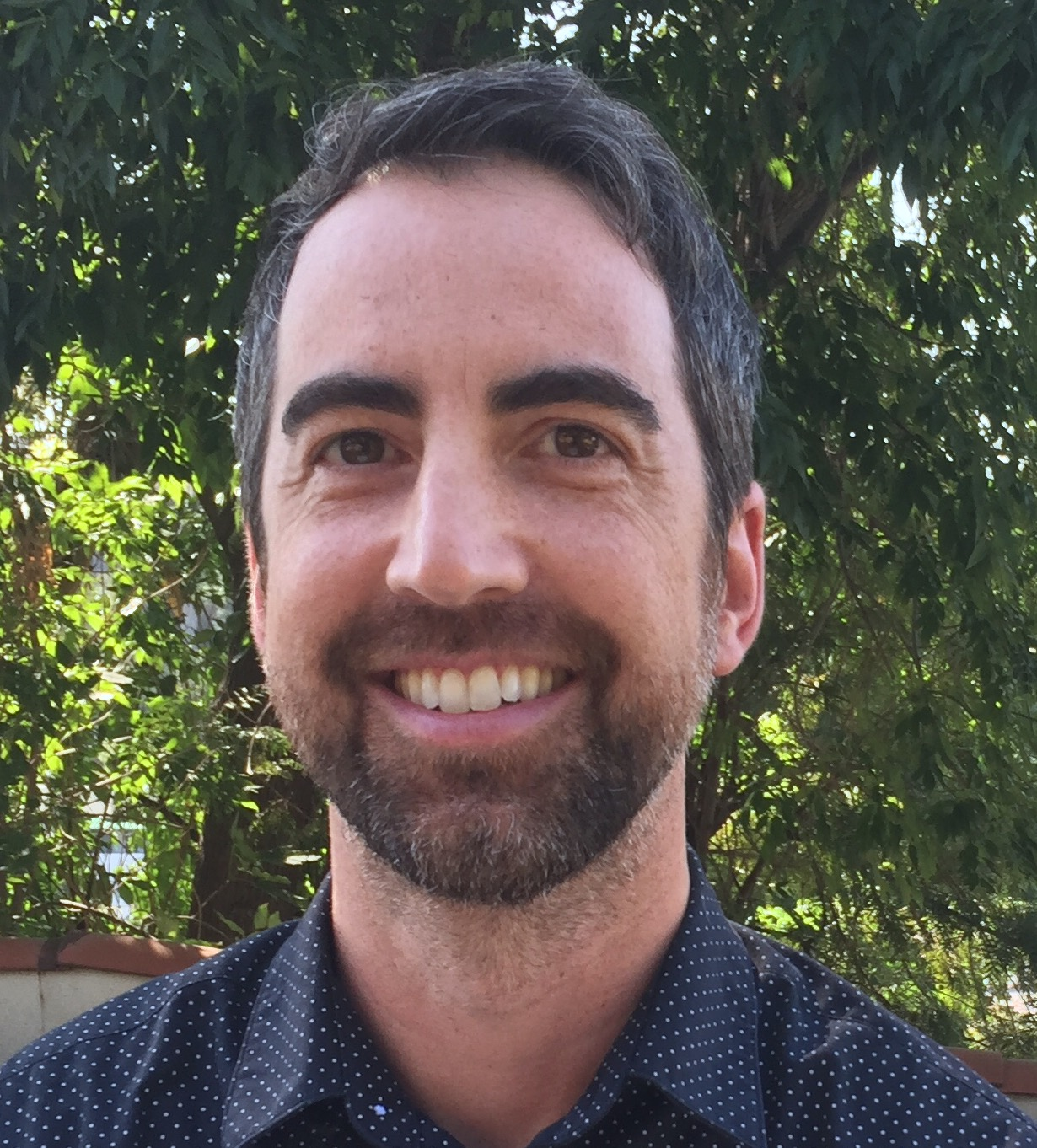
- Allgeier in 2017
- Born: March 10, 1971 (age 55); Dayton, Ohio, U.S.
- Occupations: Creative director; game designer; author
- Years active: 1993–present

Brian Allgeier (born March 10, 1971) is an American video game designer who is best known for being the original designer and creative director of the Ratchet & Clank series developed by Insomniac Games for the PS2, PS3, PS4 and PS5.

He started working in videogames in 1991 as an artist and animator on the CD-i title, Hanna Barbera’s Cartoon Carnival for Philips Media. He worked as part of the internal production group, *FunHouse*, led by game designer Cliff Johnson.

In 1999, he joined Insomniac Games as a level designer on the Spyro the Dragon series for the PlayStation and later became design director on the Ratchet & Clank series for the PlayStation 2. In 2006, he became creative director on Ratchet & Clank Future: Tools of Destruction, which was the first PlayStation 3 installment for the Ratchet & Clank series, as well as the first installment for the Future series.

== Games ==
Game title	Release	Platform	Role
Hanna Barbera's Cartoon Carnival	1993	CD-i	Lead artist
Merlin's Apprentice	1994	CD-i	Lead artist
Labyrinth of Crete	1995	CD-i	Lead artist
Running Wild	1998	PSone	Designer
Spyro 2: Ripto's Rage!	1999	PSone	Designer
Spyro 3: Year of the Dragon	2000	PSone	Designer
Ratchet & Clank	2002	PS2	Design director
Ratchet & Clank: Going Commando	2003	PS2	Design director
Ratchet & Clank: Up Your Arsenal	2004	PS2	Design director
Ratchet: Deadlocked	2005	PS2	Design manager
Resistance: Fall of Man	2006	PS3	Design manager
Ratchet & Clank Future: Tools of Destruction	2007	PS3	Creative director
Ratchet & Clank Future: Quest for Booty	2008	PS3	Creative director
Ratchet & Clank Future: A Crack in Time	2009	PS3	Creative director
Fuse	2013	PS3, Xbox 360	Co-creative director
Ratchet & Clank: Into the Nexus	2013	PS3	Creative director
Ratchet & Clank	2016	PS4	Co-creative director
Edge of Nowhere	2016	Oculus Rift	Creative director
