= Insomniac Games =

American video game developer

Insomniac Games, Inc.
- Logo used since 2017
- Formerly: Xtreme Software, Inc. (1994–1995)
- Type: Subsidiary
- Industry: Video games
- Founded: February 28, 1994; 32 years ago
- Founder: Ted Price
- Headquarters: Burbank, California, US
- Number of locations: 2 studios
- Key people: Ryan Schneider (co-studio head); Jen Huang (co-studio head); Chad Dezern (co-studio head)
- Products: Spyro series (1998–2000); Ratchet & Clank series (2002–2021); Resistance series (2006–2011); Sunset Overdrive (2014); Marvel's Spider-Man (2018–present)
- Number of employees: 450 (2025)
- Parent: PlayStation Studios (2019–present)
- Website: insomniac.games

Insomniac Games, Inc. is an American video game developer based in Burbank, California, and part of PlayStation Studios. It was founded in 1994 by Ted Price as Xtreme Software, and was renamed Insomniac Games a year later. The company is most known for developing several early PlayStation mascots, Spyro the Dragon, Ratchet and Clank, as well as the Resistance franchise, 2014's Sunset Overdrive and the Marvel's Spider-Man series with Marvel Games. In 2019, the studio was acquired by Sony Interactive Entertainment, becoming a part of SIE Worldwide Studios (now known as PlayStation Studios).

The company's first project was Disruptor, for PlayStation, whose poor sales almost led to the company's bankruptcy. Insomniac's next project was Spyro the Dragon, a successful video game that spawned two sequels within two years. Insomniac closely collaborated with Sony Computer Entertainment (later renamed Sony Interactive Entertainment) and created two game franchises, Ratchet & Clank, and Resistance. The two franchises proved to be both a critical and financial success for the company. The company began work on its first multiplatform game Fuse in 2013 (with Electronic Arts as its publisher), but the game turned out to become one of Insomniac's worst-reviewed games.

Since 2014, Insomniac has actively expanded its portfolio of games. The company worked with Microsoft Studios on 2014's Sunset Overdrive, partnered with GameTrust to release the underwater Metroidvania game Song of the Deep, and released several mobile games and virtual reality projects. In 2016, Insomniac released a remake of the first Ratchet & Clank, and in 2018 released its first licensed title, Marvel's Spider-Man for the PlayStation 4; an additional game, Marvel's Spider-Man: Miles Morales, was released for the PlayStation 4 and PlayStation 5 in 2020, this was followed by Marvel's Spider-Man 2 on the PlayStation 5 in 2023. The studio's most recent project is Marvel's Wolverine for the PlayStation 5.

Before 2019, Insomniac remained as an independent studio working for Sony and other publishers such as Microsoft, EA, and Oculus. In August 2019, Sony announced it had agreed to acquire Insomniac as the 14th internal studio within SIE Worldwide Studios. Over the years, Insomniac Games has received considerable recognition from critics as an acclaimed video game developer. It was named the twentieth-best video game developer by IGN, and one of the best places to work in America by the Society for Human Resource Management.

== History ==
=== Founding and Disruptor (1994–1996) ===
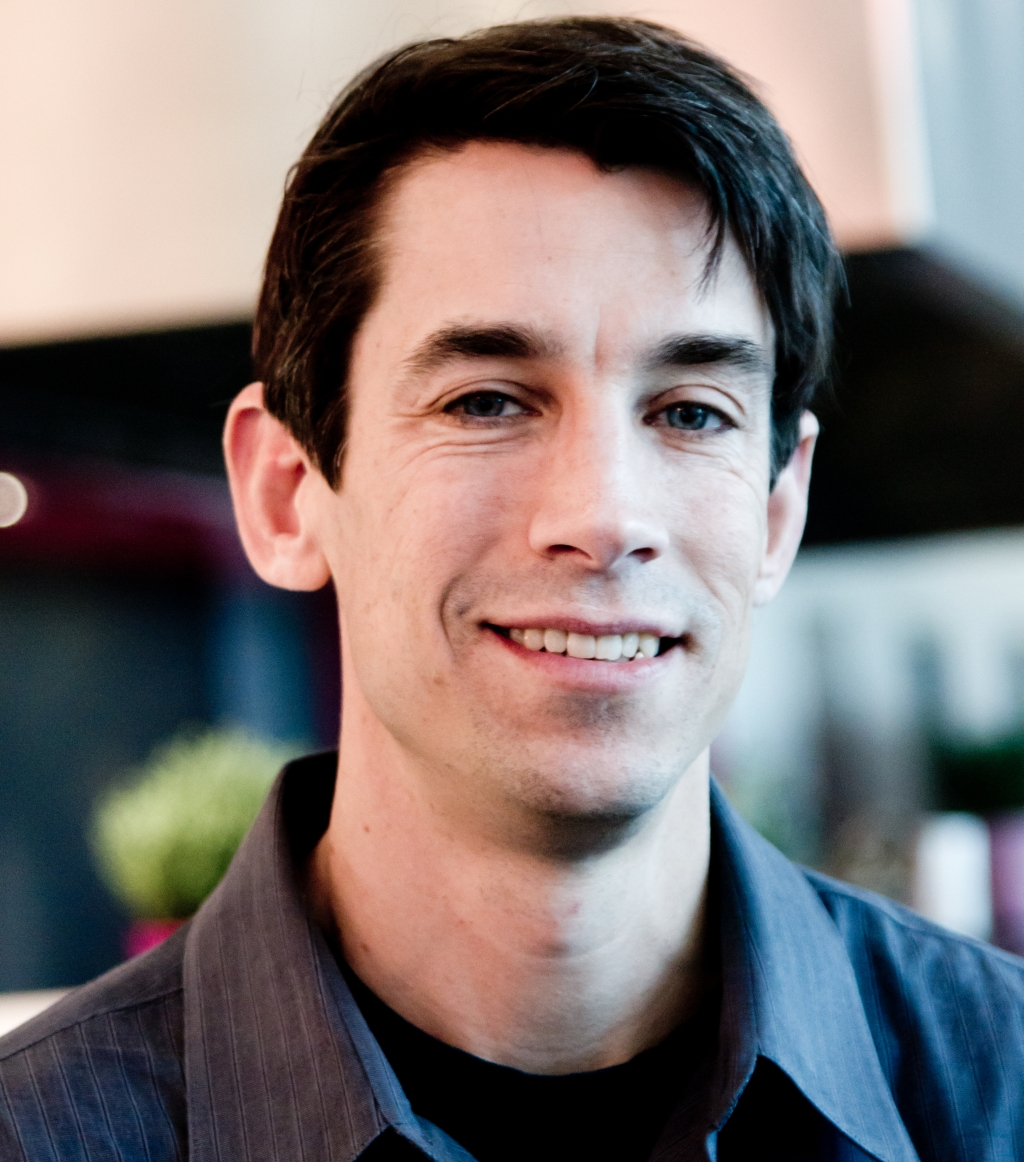
Ted Price, founder and former CEO of Insomniac Games

Insomniac Games was founded by Ted Price, who was determined to work in the video game industry since the release of Atari 2600 in 1977, when he was nine years old. The company was incorporated on February 28, 1994.

Price was joined by Alex Hastings, his fellow graduate and an expert in computer programming, in June 1994. Hastings' brother Brian Hastings joined Insomniac shortly afterwards. The studio was named "Xtreme Software" for a year but in 1995 it was forced to rename itself by another company with the same name. The studio shortlisted "The Resistance Incorporated", "Ragnarok", "Black Sun Software", "Ice Nine" and "Moon Turtle" before choosing the name "Insomniac Games". According to Price, the company chose this name because "it suddenly makes sense", even though it was not their first choice.

Shortly after the company's establishment, it began developing its first project. The team took inspirations from the popular Doom, and hoped to capitalize upon the industry's excitement for a first-person shooter. The team lacked experience and considered developing a "Doom clone". The game was developed for the Panasonic 3DO because its developer kit was inexpensive, and the team had high hopes for the console. Using a time frame of one month, the team developed a functional gameplay demo for the game. It was pitched to various publishers and was later shown to Mark Cerny, an executive producer from Universal Interactive Studios, who was impressed by the team's efforts. Universal published the game and helped with funding and marketing. Universal helped the game's development and cutscenes, and hired actors to film real-time sequences. Catherine Hardwicke was hired to lead production design, and inspirations were taken from Warhawk.

Cerny gave input and feedback on the game's level-design. However, the 3DO did not perform as they had expected, and Universal suggested that the team should switch to Sony Computer Entertainment's PlayStation to increase sales of the game. The game originally ran on a custom engine developed by Alex Hastings, and was upgraded and converted for the PlayStation within a month. The debut title was called Disruptor, and was released worldwide in November 1996.

Disruptor was released to positive critical reception, and was named "Dark Horse of the Year" by various gaming publications. John Romero, founder of Doom developer id Software praised the game. Insomniac considered Disruptor a lesson about video game development. According to Price, it was "the best game that nobody ever heard of". With little marketing and advertisement, the game was a commercial failure for Insomniac. Despite the game's poor performance, Universal continued to partner with Insomniac for its next game. The team's morale was low; they decided to develop something new instead of a sequel to Disruptor.

=== Spyro the Dragon (1996–2000) ===
At that time, the demographic for the PlayStation shifted, as more children and teenagers started to use the console. As a result, the team decided not to make another violent game like Disruptor and instead develop a family-friendly game that would be suitable for every member of a family, regardless of their age. The family game market was dominated by Sony's competitor Nintendo with games like Super Mario 64, while the PlayStation had no similar exclusives. Cerny pushed Insomniac Games to develop a game with a mascot and mass appeal. Craig Stitt, an environment artist of Disruptor, proposed that the game's theme and story should revolve around an anthropomorphic dragon. At the same time, Alex Hastings began developing an engine that specialized in games with panoramic view, which is suitable for open world games. The engine allowed more gameplay features including the ability for the dragon to glide through air. Spyro the Dragon was released in late 1998.

The game received critical acclaim upon launch and received awards from publications. Sales of the game were relatively low initially, but climbed after Christmas that year, and overall sales of the game exceeded two million. The team was expanded to 13 staff members. Because of Spyro the Dragon's success, the studio was requested to develop a sequel for it. The development of Spyro 2: Ripto's Rage! began shortly after the launch of Spyro the Dragon. The team considered developing the sequel a challenge for them; they had to develop new ideas to "revolutionize" the franchise within a short time. The team brainstormed ideas but later chose to expand a mini-game from the original Spyro the Dragon, which they thought had offered a different experience from Spyro. The team designed a mature story and advanced cinematics for the game. It met its target release window, and was released in late 1999. Hastings was worried about the release because the game's development cycle was rushed and truncated.

So we decided that it was better for us to start a new franchise, try to come up with a new character than to try it to push Spyro again.

— Ted Price on the aftermath of Spyro: Year of the Dragon.

The studio was asked to develop the third installment in the Spyro the Dragon series upon the release of Ripto's Rage!. To make the game more varied than its predecessors, the team introduced more special moves for Spyro the Dragon and more playable characters. The dragon's personality was made more approachable for players. The company struggled to create new ideas for the sequel. During the game's development, the team expanded to about 20 to 25 people. Brian Allgeier, who would later become Insomniac's games' director, joined the studio at that time. Spyro: Year of the Dragon was released worldwide in late 2000. After releasing three games in three years, the team decided to move on for a new project that had new original characters. Year of the Dragon is the last Insomniac Games-developed Spyro game. This was the end of Insomniac Games' partnership with Universal as the team at Insomniac started to work directly to develop games for the PlayStation consoles.

=== Ratchet & Clank (2000–2005) ===
In 2000, Sony released its successor to the PlayStation, the PlayStation 2. Insomniac's ideas for its first PlayStation 2 project included Monster Knight, a concept that was designed in 1999 but the game did not get beyond its planning stage. The canceled project was revealed 13 years after the game's conception. The second title was Girl with a Stick, which took inspirations from The Legend of Zelda and Tomb Raider. It was intended as a serious game, and to prove Insomniac's ability to create games other than platformers. Insomniac spent six months on the project, developing several prototypes and a functional demo. However, most staff members, beside Price, were not passionate about the project, and thought it was "one-dimensional". Sony thought the game would not find a market, and recommended Insomniac to "play to [their] strengths". As a result, Girl with a Stick was scrapped. According to Price, Girl with a Stick is a lesson for Insomniac and its first failure.

A few weeks after the cancellation of Girl with a Stick, Brian Hastings proposed that the company should work on a space adventure game with a science fiction theme. The game originally revolved around a reptilian alien with weapons traveling across planets. The reptile character evolved into a caveman, and eventually became a fictional creature called a "Lombax". They named the creature Ratchet and designed a robot companion called Clank for Ratchet. Inspirations for the game were drawn from manga, Conker's Bad Fur Day and from Spyro the Dragon. To differentiate the project from Insomniac's previous projects, it made the game more complex and included shooting and role-playing gameplay elements. The team was excited about this project; however, the company was unable to develop a demo for the game because it did not have a suitable engine. As a result, it developed "Art Nuevo de Flash Gordon", a Metropolis diorama, for Sony, which decided to help the game's funding and publishing. Jason Rubin, on behalf of Naughty Dog, lent Insomniac the engine used in Jak and Daxter: The Precursor Legacy. The game's title was Ratchet & Clank; it was originally to be a launch title for the PlayStation 2 but it was delayed by two years and was released in November 2002. It was a critical success.

Five months before the launch of Ratchet & Clank, Sony approved the development of its sequel. Insomniac hoped to bring new elements to the franchise; it received feedback from players and improved some features of Ratchet & Clank. About a year later, Ratchet & Clank: Going Commando was released to critical acclaim, at which time Insomniac had finished the prototype of its next game, Ratchet & Clank: Up Your Arsenal, which introduced a multiplayer mode and expanded upon Going Commando's arenas. Alex Hastings continued to optimize the engine and increase its processing power to fine-tune the game. The sales of Up Your Arsenal were considerably higher than those of its predecessors; it was the highest-rated game in the franchise's history.

Insomniac released three Ratchet & Clank games within three years. As of 2005, Insomniac intended to change the direction of the franchise after Up Your Arsenal. Hastings hoped the company's next game would have a darker tone than its predecessors. As a result, the plot switched its focus to Ratchet. The developers were inspired by The Running Man and Battle Royale; they developed a mostly linear action game with limited platforming elements. While the gameplay of the fourth game in the series is similar to that of its predecessors, Clank's role was significantly diminished and the character's name was removed from the game's title. Ratchet: Deadlocked was released in 2005.

=== PlayStation 3 era (2006–2012) ===
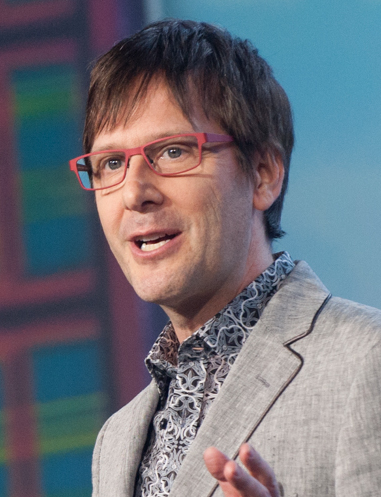
Mark Cerny gave advice on multiple Insomniac games.

While Insomniac was handling the development of the Ratchet & Clank franchise, the team wanted to work on something else. With the launch of the PlayStation 3, the team thought users of the new console would be more mature than those of its predecessors and wanted to develop a game to cater for them. They thought the studio should not specialize in one genre. This new project was part of Insomniac's expansion; the company wanted to have multiple projects in parallel development. This project began development after the completion of Deadlocked. The team agreed to develop something different for a different platform. Inspired by Starship Troopers, Resistance: Fall of Man was Insomniac's first first-person shooter after Disruptor. To make the game stand-out, they experimented with turning it into a squad-based shooter and introducing giant lizard enemies which were later scrapped. Sony recommended Insomniac to change its lizard antagonist because they were not fun to play with. Furthermore, the team disagreed about the game's setting.

Cerny wanted to set the game—proposed as a "space opera" game—during World War I, but this was later changed to World War II because the developers wanted to introduce extreme weaponry to the game. It was shifted to the 1950s because the team considered the market for World War II shooters was over-saturated at that time. Resistance: Fall of Man was a launch title for the PlayStation 3; the team said developing a new game for the console was a challenge because it had to work quickly to meet its target release window. The game was a financial and critical success, despite causing controversy over the use of Manchester Cathedral. The development of the sequel soon began; the team wanted to drastically change the game, leading to internal debate between staff members. The sequel, Resistance 2, was released in 2008.

Meanwhile, development of the Ratchet & Clank franchise continued. The team decided to rewrite the characters when the franchise shifted to the PlayStation 3. They introduced the Future series, which includes Ratchet & Clank Future: Tools of Destruction (2007), Quest for Booty (2008) and A Crack in Time (2009). In 2008, the company established a new studio of 25 to 30 developers, led by Chad Dezern and Shaun McCabe, in North Carolina. The new studio was responsible for some of Insomniac's Ratchet & Clank games.

Both the Resistance franchise and the Ratchet & Clank franchise continued into the 2010s. The team in North Carolina developed Ratchet & Clank: All 4 One, which received mixed reviews. The North Carolina team continued to develop the next game in the series, Ratchet & Clank: Full Frontal Assault, which expanded upon levels from previous games in the series and has a structure similar to that of a tower defense game.

Meanwhile, the company developed Resistance 3—the sequel to Resistance 2—which was designed to be similar to Fall of Man. The team at Insomniac reviewed players' feedback regarding the negative aspects of Resistance 2, re-introduced some mechanics from Fall of Man, and focused on narrative. They considered such an approach can differentiate a franchise from other first-person shooters. Resistance 3 was regarded by the team as the best game in the series, but it sold poorly and was a financial failure. According to Price, the team was disappointed but were still proud of the project. In early 2012, Price announced that the company would not be involved in any future Resistance projects. Sony retains the intellectual property rights to the franchise.

=== Diversifying portfolio (2012–2019) ===
Insomniac had exclusively developed games for the PlayStation console until in 2010 when Insomniac announced its partnership with Electronic Arts via EA Partners to develop a multi-platform game for the PlayStation 3 and Microsoft's Xbox 360 console. The company hoped to reach a wider audience, while keeping the rights to its IP and retain full control of its franchises. The company revealed nothing about the game. The company established a new subsidiary called Insomniac Click, which focused on casual games and games for Facebook. Its first game was not set in any of Insomniac's existing franchises. Insomniac again partnered with Electronic Arts, which owned the casual game developer Playfish, to help the game to reach a broad audience. Outernauts was announced shortly after; it was released in July 2012 for browsers and mobile platforms. Click was later re-incorporated into Insomniac, and the browser version of Outernauts was canceled.

The EA Partners game was revealed at Electronic Entertainment Expo 2011 as Overstrike. This game was pitched by Ratchet & Clank director Brian Allgeier and it has a direction similar to that of the Ratchet & Clank series. The team thought Overstrike would appeal to teenagers. After several play-testing sessions, it realized its game was too simple for its target group. The company developed many weapons for the game, none of which related to the game's story. The developers retooled the game and changed it to attract older players and make weapons an important part of the game. The game focuses on a co-operative campaign, which the company thought was a popular trend at that time. It was renamed Fuse and was released worldwide in May 2013. Fuse was one of the lowest-rated games developed by Insomniac, and was another commercial failure, debuting in 37th place in the UK in its first week of release. Fuse was considered a learning lesson for Insomniac to understand the type of game it is good at making. The reception to Fuse showed the company it should develop "colorful, playful experiences that's loaded with unusual, sometimes silly weapons". Also in 2013, the Ratchet & Clank Future game, Ratchet & Clank: Into the Nexus, was released.

Running parallel development with Fuse, and beginning soon after the completion of Resistance 3, Insomniac Games began development on Sunset Overdrive. The game was inspired by Hyena Men of Kenya, Tank Girl, I Am Legend, The Young Ones, Halloween masks from the 1960s, and Lego. Sunset Overdrive was created by Marcus Smith and Drew Murray; their first pitch to Insomniac's head was rejected as being too confusing. They were given one week to re-pitch the title, and they persuaded studio heads to begin the game's development. The game was later pitched to various publishers, which rejected them because Insomniac demanded to retain ownership of the intellectual property. The project was later pitched to Microsoft Studios, which was eager to work with Insomniac. Microsoft allowed Insomniac to own the rights to the game. Sunset Overdrive was made for Microsoft's Xbox One console; it was released on the 20th anniversary of Insomniac, in 2014.

Insomniac announced Slow Down, Bull, a part-commercial and part-charity project for release on Microsoft Windows; it is the company's first game for Windows. Insomniac released a remake of Ratchet & Clank for the PlayStation 4 in 2016. In January 2016, Insomniac announced its next game, Song of the Deep, a water-based video game inspired by Metroid and Castlevania: Symphony of the Night. The game was published by retailer GameStop.

During E3 2015, the company announced Edge of Nowhere, a third-person action-adventure game for the virtual reality hardware Oculus Rift. In April 2016, the company announced two new virtual reality titles: Feral Rites, a hack and slash game, and The Unspoken, a fantasy multiplayer game, for the Oculus Rift. According to Price, the company began focusing on virtual reality projects as the team is enthusiastic about the technology, and that it allows the company to develop an expertise in creating VR games. The studio signed an exclusive deal with Oculus VR as Insomniac believed that both companies shared the same passion to "[bring] games to life", and that it allowed Insomniac to retain the rights of its intellectual properties. Price compared the agreement to its previous first-party deals, and added that having the opportunity to develop games for the first generation of VR platforms is something the team could not reject. Despite the new direction, Price added that it will not give up on making console AAA video games. At E3 2016, Insomniac announced its next AAA title, Marvel's Spider-Man, developed for the PlayStation 4 in conjunction with Marvel Entertainment. Bryan Intihar, producer of Sunset Overdrive, was the game's creative director.

Logo used from 2002 to 2017

In September 2017, Insomniac Games revealed its new brand logo, which replaced the moon image standing in for the "O" with a more stylized iconograph. The company said that part of its rebranding was to "think beyond the moon". Insomniac chief brand officer Ryan Schneider said part of the rebranding was to prevent the studio being pigeonholed; while the moon-based logo had well-represented the company for its Spyro and Ratchet & Clank cartoon-like games, it did not reflect well on the expanded directions it had moved in recent years, such as the Spider-Man game. Schneider said that along with the brand change, the company plans to be engaging with players, offering live-streaming of its work, and re-establishing a new identity, without completely eschewing its past. Schneider said it effectively "blew up the moon" to establish this new direction.

=== Sony acquisition (2019–present) ===
In August 2019, Sony announced a definitive agreement to acquire Insomniac as one of its first-party developers. This would make Insomniac the 14th internal studio with Sony's SIE Worldwide Studios division. Sony's Shawn Layden stated it had been evaluating the option of acquiring Insomniac for some time, and the success of its Spider-Man game contributed significantly towards this end, demonstrating that Insomniac was an "impact maker" and a "style-setter". Layden believed that Insomniac's working relationship with Sony would not change significantly in the acquisition, leaving the studio in its own creative control, but would allow Insomniac to have closer access to other innovative technologies throughout SIE Worldwide Studios. The acquisition, for which Sony paid ¥24,895 million (equivalent to $229 million), was completed on November 15, 2019.

At the PlayStation 5 reveal event on June 11, 2020, Insomniac announced two new games: Marvel's Spider-Man: Miles Morales, a spin-off to Marvel's Spider-Man, and Ratchet & Clank: Rift Apart. The former was a launch title for the PS5, released alongside a remaster of the original Marvel's Spider-Man for the console in November 2020. The latter released on June 11, 2021, exclusively for the PS5.

On September 9, 2021, at the PlayStation showcase event, Insomniac announced a sequel to Marvel's Spider Man entitled Marvel's Spider-Man 2 would be released in 2023 for PlayStation 5. The company also announced the development of a standalone game, Marvel's Wolverine, likewise for the PS5.

In December 2023, hackers from ransomware group Rhysida targeted Insomniac, threatening to release information if it did not pay 2 million dollars in bitcoin. Insomniac refused to pay, and as a result, over 1.67 terabytes of data was leaked containing files, including an early release build of Marvel's Wolverine. The leak also contained Insomniac and Sony Interactive Entertainment data such as employees' personal information, past sales information, and plans for Insomniac through 2032. These included additional titles from Marvel, including a Venom-based game, as well as possible X-Men titles that would remain exclusive to the PlayStation platform through 2035. Players, developers, and publishers expressed sympathy for the leak, and Insomniac stated on social media that "We're both saddened and angered about the recent criminal cyberattack on our studio and the emotional toll it's taken on our dev team. We have focused inwardly for the last several days to support each other." The studio intends to continue work on Wolverine, stressing that the leaked version was still from early in development. According to Rhysida, only 98% of the data it acquired was leaked, with the other 2% being sold, and its only motivation for the attack was for money.

In July 2024, voice actors, motion capture employees and some other people employed by Insomniac who were members of Screen Actors Guild-American Federation of Television and Radio Artists (SAG-AFTRA) began a labor strike over concerns about A.I.

Price announced his retirement as CEO in January 2025, to leave by the end of March 2025. His position was filled jointly by Ryan Schneider, Jen Huang, and Chad Dezern as co-studio heads. In April 2026, the studio renewed and expanded their office.

== Games developed ==
List of games developed by Insomniac Games
Year	Title	Platform(s)
1996	Disruptor	PlayStation
1998	Spyro the Dragon	PlayStation
1999	Spyro 2: Ripto's Rage!	PlayStation
2000	Spyro: Year of the Dragon	PlayStation
2002	Ratchet & Clank	PlayStation 2
2003	Ratchet & Clank: Going Commando	PlayStation 2
2004	Ratchet & Clank: Up Your Arsenal	PlayStation 2
2005	Ratchet: Deadlocked	PlayStation 2
2006	Resistance: Fall of Man	PlayStation 3
2007	Ratchet & Clank Future: Tools of Destruction	PlayStation 3
2008	Ratchet & Clank Future: Quest for Booty	PlayStation 3
2008	Resistance 2	PlayStation 3
2009	Ratchet & Clank Future: A Crack in Time	PlayStation 3
2011	Resistance 3	PlayStation 3
2011	Ratchet & Clank: All 4 One	PlayStation 3
2012	Ratchet & Clank: Full Frontal Assault	PlayStation 3, PlayStation Vita
2012	Outernauts	iOS
2013	Fuse	PlayStation 3, Xbox 360
2013	Ratchet & Clank: Into the Nexus	PlayStation 3
2014	Sunset Overdrive	Xbox One, Microsoft Windows
2015	Slow Down, Bull	Windows, Mac OS X, Linux
2015	Fruit Fusion	Android, iOS
2015	Bad Dinos	Android, iOS
2015	Digit & Dash	iOS
2016	Ratchet & Clank	PlayStation 4
2016	Song of the Deep	Windows, PlayStation 4, Xbox One
2016	Edge of Nowhere	Windows
2016	The Unspoken	Windows
2016	Feral Rites	Windows
2018	Marvel's Spider-Man	PlayStation 4
2018	Seedling	Magic Leap One
2019	Stormland	Windows
2019	Strangelets	Magic Leap One
2020	Marvel's Spider-Man: Miles Morales	Windows, PlayStation 4, PlayStation 5
2020	Marvel's Spider-Man Remastered	Windows, PlayStation 5
2021	Ratchet & Clank: Rift Apart	Windows, PlayStation 5
2023	Marvel's Spider-Man 2	Windows, PlayStation 5
2026	Marvel's Wolverine	PlayStation 5

=== Spyro (1998–2000) ===
Insomniac is the creator of the Spyro series and developed the first three games, Spyro the Dragon (1998), Ripto's Rage! (1999) and Year of the Dragon (2000) for the first PlayStation console. It is a series of platform games that follow Spyro the Dragon as he progresses through a medieval-styled world. The dragon can glide, charge and exhale fire. The original trilogy has collectively sold 8,000,000 copies. The series continued after Insomniac ceased developing further Spyro games. Universal Studios outsourced the game development via Universal Interactive; two subseries, The Legend of Spyro and Skylanders, were then developed. Microsoft Gaming is now the owner of the franchise.

=== Ratchet & Clank (2002–2021) ===
Ratchet & Clank is a series of action-adventure games with platform elements. Players mostly take control of Ratchet as he progresses through various planets in order to save the galaxy. Clank is playable in several segments of these games. The series is divided into two parts; the original series for the PlayStation 2 (Ratchet & Clank (2002), Going Commando (2003), Up Your Arsenal (2004) and Ratchet: Deadlocked (2005) and the Future series for the PlayStation 3 (Tools of Destruction (2007), Quest for Booty (2008), A Crack in Time (2009) and Into the Nexus (2013). The first three titles in the series were remastered and packaged in the Ratchet & Clank Collection for the PlayStation 3 and PlayStation Vita, with Ratchet & Clank (2016) being the latest release on the PlayStation 4. A Ratchet & Clank animated film, with screenplay and additional marketing by Insomniac, was released in 2016 as well, to coincide with the release of the video game remake. After the announcement that Sony acquired Insomniac Games, SIE Worldwide Studios boss Shawn Layden stated that the Ratchet & Clank series will be a vital series for it in the future. The next game in development, Ratchet & Clank: Rift Apart, was first revealed at the PS5 Future of Gaming event on June 11, 2020 as a PlayStation 5 exclusive, and the game was released on June 11, 2021.

=== Resistance (2006–2011) ===
Resistance is a series of first-person shooter games set circa 1950 in an alternate history. An alien race called the Chimera have invaded and conquered Earth, and has turned humans into monstrous supersoldiers. Players play as Nathan Hale in Resistance: Fall of Man (2006) and Resistance 2 (2008), and as Joseph Capelli in Resistance 3 (2011). All three games were released for the PlayStation 3 system. The series includes the handheld games Resistance: Retribution, developed by Bend Studio for the PlayStation Portable, and Resistance: Burning Skies, developed by Nihilistic Software for the PlayStation Vita.

=== Marvel's Spider-Man game series (2018–present) ===
Marvel's Spider-Man is a series of action-adventure games based on the comic book superhero Spider-Man. Players play as Peter Parker in Marvel's Spider-Man (2018), and as Miles Morales in Marvel's Spider-Man: Miles Morales (2020). The studio released Marvel's Spider-Man for the PlayStation 4 on September 7, 2018. The game received widespread positive acclaim from various critics. Since its release, the game has sold over 9 million physical and digital units worldwide by November 2018, increasing to 13.2 million copies by August 2019, making it one of the best-selling PlayStation 4 games. The game was remastered for the Ultimate Edition of Spider-Man: Miles Morales as Spider-Man Remastered for the PlayStation 5 in November 2020. The remaster was also released as a standalone title for Microsoft Windows on August 12, 2022.

A standalone spin-off title in the series, Marvel's Spider-Man: Miles Morales, was first revealed at the 2020 PS5 Future of Gaming event on June 11, 2020. The title released for PlayStation 4 and PlayStation 5. It was released starting November 12, 2020 alongside the release of the PlayStation 5. It was released for Microsoft Windows in fall 2022.

On October 20, 2023, Insomniac released Marvel's Spider-Man 2 (2023), which is followed by Marvel's Wolverine, a standalone game set in the same universe and based on the Marvel Comics character of the same name, both for PlayStation 5.

=== Other games ===
Other notable games developed by Insomniac include Disruptor (1996), Outernauts (2012), Fuse (2013), Sunset Overdrive (2014), and Marvel's Wolverine (2026). The company has canceled several games, including Monster Knight, Girl with a Stick for the PlayStation 2, and 1080 Pinball — a pinball simulation downloadable game — which began development in 2007. Insomniac developed a game for Oculus Rift, named Edge of Nowhere, which was released on June 6, 2016.

== Related companies ==
The company has a close relationship with video game developer Naughty Dog and they often share technology with each other. Some employees left Insomniac Games to form High Impact Games, which later collaborated with Insomniac on Ratchet & Clank projects and Jak and Daxter: The Lost Frontier. Nathan Fouts, an ex-Insomniac employee, founded his own studio and developed Weapon of Choice. HuniePop was designed by Ryan Koons, who used to be an employee of Insomniac. Between 2022 and 2025, Insomniac Games closely collaborated with sister studio Nixxes Software, who ported some of its PlayStation 5 games to Windows PCs.

== Accolades ==
In 2015 IGN named Insomniac Games the 20th best video game developer of all time. The Society for Human Resource Management called it one of the best places to work in America. It was listed in 2016 by Fortune as the 69th best place to work for Millennials.
