= Stormland =

Stormland can refer to:

- Stormland (film), 2011
- Stormland (video game), 2019
