= Fuse (video game) =

2013 video game

- Developer: Insomniac Games
- Publisher: Electronic Arts
- Director: Brian Allgeier
- Composer: Boris C. Salchow
- Platforms: PlayStation 3, Xbox 360
- Release: NA: May 28, 2013; AU: May 30, 2013; EU: May 31, 2013
- Genre: Third-person shooter
- Modes: Single-player, multiplayer

Fuse is a four-player cooperative third-person shooter video game developed by Insomniac Games and published by Electronic Arts for PlayStation 3 and Xbox 360. The game was announced as Overstrike before it was rebranded in August 2012. It was released on May 28, 2013 in North America, May 30, 2013 in Australia and on May 31, 2013 in Europe. Fuse was both a critical and commercial failure for Electronic Arts.

== Gameplay ==
Fuse is an action game, which features four-player co-op and a selection of weapons, akin to those which are prominently featured in Insomniac Games' PlayStation-exclusive Ratchet & Clank and Resistance series. Each character has its own powerful unique Fuse-powered weapon than can assist other players in gameplay. For example, Dalton's weapon is a mag shield that can absorb bullets, and its secondary fire can push the bullets back to the enemies, killing them. The first official released screenshots revealed that Fuse is a third-person action game with cover shooting mechanics. Characters also have a skill tree, which can be upgraded as a player increases his or her level. The game also includes a horde mode, titled Echelon, similar to that in Gears of War.

== Plot ==
The game is set in the near future and follows a team of four misfit agents collectively known as Overstrike 9, whose mission is to stop the evil Raven Corporation from gaining an alien substance called Fuse. Using Fuse powered weapons and tech gadgets and lethal teamwork to gain the energy. The members of Overstrike 9 are Dalton Brooks (voiced by Brian Bloom), a reformed and sarcastic mercenary, equipped with a Mag Shield, which is an energy shield, Naya Deveraux (voiced by Jennifer Hale), worked for Raven with her dad, she is equipped with a cloak device and has a gun that creates tiny black holes called the Warp Rifle, Isabelle "Izzy" Sinclair (voiced by Ali Hillis), a gifted, but rebellious young scientist, equipped with a crystallization gun called the Shattergun, and Jacob Kimble (voiced by Khary Payton), a decorated detective with a bit of a temper, equipped with a fire crossbow called the Arcshot. Their government handler is Lyndon Burgess, codenamed Oculus (voiced by David Kaye). The antagonists include Dalton's ex-lover and boss, Meilin Mao (voiced by Gwendoline Yeo), Naya's estranged father working for Raven, Luther Deveraux (voiced by JB Blanc), Ivan Sovlenko (voiced by Steve Blum), who purposely injects himself with Fuse to grant himself superhuman abilities and Senator William Fable (voiced by David B. Mitchell), who plans to use Fuse to make his weaponry more powerful.

A top secret government weapons lab, called Hyperion Base, had mysteriously went quiet some time after Senator William Fable arrived. In response to this, Lyndon Burgess sends in his black ops team, Overstrike 9, to investigate. Once inside, they learn of Fuse, an alien substance that radically bonds with anything it comes into contact with, used in development of advanced weapons. At the same time, Raven, a paramilitary corporation, breaks in. Overstrike 9 manages to reach the main Fuse lab. Though Dalton orders it destroyed, Izzy "accidentally" opens the main Fuse vault at the same time Raven captures the lab. Dalton's former lover and boss, Meilin Mao, appears, holding Fable hostage. Dalton threatened to kill Fable, suspecting that he allowed Raven into the base but his team reminds him that they are outnumbered, so they surrender.

Overstrike 9 is brought to Raven's underwater Triton Base, where it is revealed that Dalton's suspicions were correct, as Fable was in league with Raven. At the same time, Naya is reunited with her estranged father, Luther, who seeks to aid their escape. Overstrike 9 then goes to the base's Fuse core and prepare to detonate it but first had to deal with Ivan Sovlenko, who purposely injects himself with Fuse to create illusions but they defeat him. Overstrike 9 then escapes the destruction of the base.

The team is later sent to Sheng Island, where Meilin was planning to launch a corrupted Fuse rocket at a populated area as a demonstration for interested buyers. They were able to lock the missile in place and Dalton kills Meilin, narrowly escaping as the corrupted Fuse ignites, destroying all life on the island.

Overstrike 9 is next sent to Karakoram in search of Luther and Fable. But at the same time, Fable betrays Raven, revealing to be in league with a mysterious organization only known as "the Order". He coerced half of Raven to defect and steal the corrupted Fuse. Overstrike 9 is unable to attempt pursuit. For their failure, the client that hired the team rescinded their contract. However, Naya convinces the team that her father might be able to help them locate the Fuse and reveals that she had located his safe house in Jodhpur. With Burgess' aid, Overstrike 9 storms Luther's compound at the same time Fable's loyalists assault it. Fighting their way through both way through both Raven factions, Overstrike 9 manages to locate Luther and enlist his aid against Fable.

Overstrike 9 goes into space, where Fable was deploying satellites to fire Fuse-powered missiles to create an extinction event and force the world into ending conflict, framing Raven as a scapegoat. As a demonstration, Fable wipes out Munich. Overstrike 9 manages to prevent Fable from firing anymore by launched AI-controlled shuttles into destroying the satellites. They then arrive at the last vault of corrupted Fuse. They managed to destroy it at the same time Fable engages them in a powered exoskeleton. After a vigorous battle, Overstrike 9 is able to vaporize Fable before narrowly escaping the space station's destruction. Then suddenly, their shuttle collides with debris.

Burgess and his client presume Overstrike 9 dead and agree to cover up the destruction of Munich to have been perpetrated by Raven fanatics. Burgess also learns from the client that Fable's faction was known as the Order of Grigori, who may be searching for other stockpiles of Fuse.

Up in space, it is revealed that Overstrike 9 had survived and are merely unconscious. Dalton then opens his eyes, revealing that they are glowing, hinting that he, and presumably the rest of his team, have bonded with the Fuse.

== Development ==
In May 2010, Ted Price said Insomniac Games were at work on a multiplatform game for both PlayStation 3 and Xbox 360. On June 6, 2011, during Electronic Arts' press conference at E3 2011, that game was revealed to be called Overstrike with a trailer and a short appearance and synopsis from Price. On August 31, 2012, the game was revealed to have been reworked and rebranded as Fuse. The game was developed at their main studio in Burbank, California, and was published as part of the EA Partners program for the aforementioned platforms. This marks the first time the developer was to own its own IP, as well as the first time they released a game with a publisher other than Sony Computer Entertainment since Universal Interactive Studios.

== Reception ==
Reception

Aggregate score
Aggregator	Score	
Aggregator	PS3	Xbox 360
Metacritic	63/100	62/100

Review scores
Publication	Score	
Publication	PS3	Xbox 360
Destructoid	N/A	4/10
Edge	N/A	4/10
Electronic Gaming Monthly	N/A	7.5/10
Eurogamer	N/A	5/10
Game Informer	7.75/10	7.75/10
GameRevolution	3.5/5	N/A
GameSpot	7/10	7/10
GameTrailers	N/A	6.5/10
Giant Bomb	N/A	3/5
IGN	6.5/10	6.5/10
Joystiq	N/A	2/5
PlayStation Official Magazine – UK	6/10	N/A
Official Xbox Magazine (US)	N/A	6/10
Polygon	6.5/10	6.5/10
Metro	N/A	4/10
Slant Magazine	2.5/5	N/A

Fuse received "mixed" reviews on both platforms according to the review aggregation website Metacritic. Most praised its Fuse weapons and co-op action, but criticized its team A.I. and confusing tone. Its change in art style and tone from Overstrike was criticized by some which called its new look generic and uninspired. First week sales in the UK were low, with the game reaching number 37 on the all-format charts.

National Post gave the Xbox 360 version a score of eight out of ten and said it was "a strong foray for Insomniac. It's the Ratchet & Clank/Resistance developer's first game that isn't exclusive to Sony systems, and is a polished piece of software." The Escapist similarly gave it a score of four stars out of five and said, "Some of Fuse's flaws, like the grindy boss fights and a storyline that takes itself a little too seriously at times, can harm the experience, but it's a well built third-person shooter that's fun to play solo or on a team." 411Mania gave the same console version a score of 6.3 out of 10 and called it "a bare-boned [sic] co-op shooter. If you need something to play with friends, it's not a bad game, just lacking a personality that other co-op shooters tend to have. The Xenotech weapons are worth a look, but the rest of the game is forgettable." GameZone gave it a score of six out of ten and said it was "exactly what we thought it'd be: a tired, worn-out shooter with very little to offer outside of a generic action shooter experience." The Globe and Mail gave it a similarly mixed review and said, "There's nothing remarkable about it – it feels like a game we've seen a hundred times before. At this point in the evolution of games and of this generation of consoles in particular, that sort of mere serviceability just isn't enough to impress."

The Digital Fix gave the PlayStation 3 version a score of six out of ten and said it was "so poor by Insomniac's usually high standards that it's hard to believe Insomniac actually made it." Slant Magazine gave the same console version two-and-a-half stars out of five and said that nothing "really excuses the banality of Fuse itself, which is missing the larger-than-life set pieces that might make the campaign pop, nor the redundancy of the gameplay, which gives you all these cool weapons only to have you do the same thing with them over and over again, regardless of whether you're on a space station or an underwater research facility." Metro gave the Xbox 360 version four out of ten and called it "An inexplicably bland shooter from the usually reliable Insomniac that has no personality and no sense of purpose beyond a few hours of empty co-op action."
