= Song of the Deep =

2016 video game by Insomniac Games

- Developer: Insomniac Games
- Publisher: GameTrust Games
- Writer: Brian Hastings
- Composer: Jonathan Wandag
- Engine: Unity
- Platforms: PlayStation 4; Windows; Xbox One
- Release: NA: July 12, 2016; PAL: July 19, 2016
- Genres: Action-adventure, Metroidvania
- Mode: Single-player

Song of the Deep is an action-adventure video game developed by Insomniac Games and published by GameTrust Games. In the game, the player controls Merryn, a young girl who crafts a makeshift submarine to search for her father who went missing while fishing. The game was released in July 2016 on PlayStation 4, Windows, and Xbox One. The retail chain GameStop published the game, under the brand of GameTrust Games, the chain's first foray into such distribution.

== Plot and gameplay ==
Song of the Deep has the player control Merryn, a 12-year-old girl who loves her father, a fisherman, especially when he tells her tall tales of his adventures. When her father goes missing at sea one day, she has a vision of him being trapped at the depths of the ocean. Determined to find him, she crafts a submarine and gear to explore the ocean, and is startled to see that many of her father's tales were actually true.

The game plays as a two-dimensional side-scroller in the style of a Metroidvania game. Areas of the game's world require the player to locate special improvements for Merryn and her equipment to surpass obstacles and explore further. While there are enemies in the game that can harm Merryn, the game is aimed less towards combat and more on exploration and puzzle solving, with some emphasis on the nature of how objects behave underwater.

Throughout the gameplay, a narrator tells players Merryn's progress and things seen in Merryn's point of view. The narration is performed by Siobhan Hewlett.

== Development ==
Insomniac's chief creative officer, Brian Hastings, considered Song of the Deep as a "passion project", wanting to create a heroine that his daughter could look up to. Hastings wanted this heroine to be different from the typical female hero found in video games, which tend to be "pretty", "sexy" or "badass", and instead give the heroine attributes that would reinforce positive qualities about his own daughter, "intelligence, creativity, kindness and resilience". A further influence for the heroine was the favorable feedback that Insomniac has received over the years from fans, praising with how the developers were able to create characters they could identify with.

Song of the Deep was developed by a small, fifteen-person team at Insomniac Games. Hastings compared this team to the original Insomniac team when they were developing the Spyro series, capturing the same enthusiasm and commitment from the team for Song of the Deep as they had before. Hastings found that with the smaller team, working on a new genre and gameplay space than previous titles, developers were often forced out of their comfort zone and would develop novel solution or work closer together as a team to resolve problems, making the group much more cohesive and effective.

Song of the Deep's narrative was inspired by Irish mythology, and its visual appearance from the Cliffs of Moher. The choice of a Metroidvania-style game, according to Hastings, is "just something we've never done and we wanted to", noting that the team are fans of this genre and makes a perfect approach for a game about exploring and finding secrets. The approach to the game, focusing more on the exploration of the world rather than combat, was to make the game more like a "children's science museum on an alien planet". The game is presented interspersed with artbook as if from a children's book, and Insomniac worked with Sterling Publishing to release a companion children's book for the title.

The retail chain GameStop published and distributed the game through its stores and on Steam, under the GameTrust Games division. The partnership between GameStop and Insomniac grew from a conversation about a year prior to the game's announcement, between Insomniac's Ted Price and GameStop's Mark Stanley, in charge of the company's development of new ventures. Stanley has spoken to Price about GameStop reaching more directly to players. Price had shown Stanley Song of the Deep, which had already been in development for some time, and their approach to the game's world. The two saw opportunities to work together to promote the title favorably for both companies, and formed the distribution agreement. Price notes that while GameStop has been fully supportive of the effort, Insomniac has full creative control on the title. Stanley affirmed that GameStop is staying out of the creative process, and decisions such as GameStop branding would be made to make sure Insomniac and the game are successful. GameStop also considered using its ThinkGeek marketing division to produce tie-in merchandise for the game. Stanley considers this their first foray into working this closely with a developer directly, and used the experience to explore other potential options for GameStop.

== Reception ==
Reception

Aggregate score
Aggregator	Score
Metacritic	(PC) 71/100 (PS4) 69/100 (XOne) 66/100

Review scores
Publication	Score
Destructoid	(PS4) 7/10
Easy Allies	(PS4) 3.5/5
Edge	(PS4) 4/10
Electronic Gaming Monthly	(XOne) 5.5/10
Game Informer	(PS4) 7/10
GameSpot	(PS4) 6/10
GamesRadar+	(PS4) 2.5/5
Hardcore Gamer	(PS4) 3.5/5
IGN	(PS4) 6/10
Official Xbox Magazine (UK)	(XOne) 4/10
Polygon	(XOne) 7/10
Push Square	(PS4) 7/10
Shacknews	(PS4) 6/10
USgamer	(PS4) 4.5/5
Digital Spy	(XOne) 3.5/5
Slant Magazine	(PS4) 4/5

Song of the Deep received "mixed or average" reviews, according to video game review aggregator platform Metacritic. Slant Magazine gave the PlayStation 4 version four stars out of five, saying that it was "uninspired only when it comes to its boss encounters, which end up being repetitive gauntlets of angry anglerfish enemies. Everywhere else, the game overflows with detail and creativity." Digital Spy gave the Xbox One version three-and-a-half stars out of five, saying, "If you like your Metroidvanias it's well worth diving in." However, Metro gave the same console version six out of ten, calling it "A different take on the usual Metroidvania formula, but while the story and setting are charming the puzzles are rarely anything other than frustrating."

GameStop reported that 120,000 units of the game had sold by August 2016, with about 80% of these from retail sales.
