= Ratchet & Clank (2002 video game) =

Platform video game

- North American box art
- Developer: Insomniac Games
- Publisher: Sony Computer Entertainment
- Director: Brian Allgeier
- Designer: Brian Allgeier
- Programmers: Alexander Hastings; Brian Hastings
- Artists: John Fiorito; Dave Guertin; Greg Baldwin
- Writers: Brian Hastings; Gavin Dodd; John Lally; Oliver Wade
- Composer: David Bergeaud
- Series: Ratchet & Clank
- Platform: PlayStation 2
- Release: NA/AU: November 6, 2002; EU: November 8, 2002
- Genres: Third-person shooter, platformer
- Mode: Single-player

Ratchet & Clank is a 2002 third-person shooter platform video game developed by Insomniac Games and published by Sony Computer Entertainment for the PlayStation 2 in 2002. It is the first installment in the Ratchet & Clank series. It follows Ratchet and Clank in their effort to stop corrupt business magnate Chairman Alonzo Drek from destroying other planets for the creation of a new planet for his race, the Blarg.

The game offers a wide range of weapons and gadgets that the player must use to defeat numerous enemies and solve puzzles on a variety of different planets in the fictional Solana Galaxy. The game includes several minigames, such as racing or security hacking, which the player must complete to proceed. The game was very well received by critics, who praised the graphics, gameplay, voice acting, audio, soundtrack, and comedic approach to the story; some criticism was directed at the camera, the characterization (especially towards Ratchet's personality) and the low level of difficulty in early stages.

It was followed by Ratchet & Clank: Going Commando (2003). A high-definition remaster was released as part of the Ratchet & Clank Collection for PlayStation 3 in 2012, and PlayStation Vita in 2014. An animated film based on the game was released, preceded by a remake for PlayStation 4 based on that work in 2016. An official emulation of the original PlayStation 2 version of the game is set to be re-released digitally for the PlayStation 4 and PlayStation 5 in the final quarter (Q4) of 2026.

== Gameplay ==
Ratchet, with Clank on his back, using the Blaster. Visible are the ammunition, health, and bolt counters at the top of the screen.

In Ratchet & Clank, the main playable character is Ratchet, whom the player controls from a third-person perspective, though a first-person mode to view the player's surroundings, and to aim is available. The player traverses diverse environments with a large collection of unusual gadgets and weapons, using them to defeat enemies and pass obstacles. Up to 36 weapons and gadgets can be bought or found in the game.

The player begins the game with two weapons: the "OmniWrench 8000", a standard melee weapon with a variety of uses such as interacting with puzzles in the environment, and the Bomb Glove, a short-range grenade thrower. As missions are completed across the game's various planets, more weapons and gadgets become available, including the Blaster, an automatic pistol; the Pyrocitor, a flamethrower; and the Suck Cannon, a vacuum gun, which sucks up smaller enemies and converts them into projectiles. Weapons are either found, or can be bought with bolts, the game's form of currency. The OmniWrench remains the standard melee weapon for close combat, with its own button, as all other weapons assume the role of secondary weaponry and can only be equipped one at a time, though all weapons can be carried in the player's inventory.

Bolts can be found in crates, along with ammunition, or dropped from defeated enemies. The player also needs to buy ammo for most weapons, but a small number can function without the need for ammo. Vendors, which sell weapons and ammo, are situated at strategic points throughout levels. After completing the game, the player may choose to enter "challenge mode", in which the game's difficulty level rises considerably, but all bolts and weapons acquired the first time are carried through. There is also the option to buy "gold weapons", more powerful versions of existing weapons. The game's health system, Nanotech, starts at four health bubbles equivalent to be able to take four hits, but upgrades can be purchased, giving the player a total of five hit points with the first upgrade and eight hit points with the second.

Normally, Clank rides on Ratchet's back, acting as a jet pack or similar device. Occasionally, however, Clank becomes a playable character when Ratchet is unable to explore certain areas due to their environments being hazardous. Clank can control "Gadgebots", smaller robots similar to Clank, who perform certain actions for him. Racing, in the form of hoverboard races, appear in the game. Some racing missions are necessary to progress in the game, while others are optional. One level of space combat and a level of flying through the air shooting tankers is also present. Minigames that unlock doors, extend bridges, or elevate platforms appear in most levels.

== Plot ==
In a warbot factory on planet Quartu, a defective but intelligent robot escapes and crash-lands on Veldin, the homeworld of the mechanic Ratchet (Mikey Kelley), a feline-like humanoid known as a Lombax. After regaining consciousness, the robot, nicknamed Clank (David Kaye), explains he is on a mission to stop Chairman Alonzo Drek (Kevin Michael Richardson), a corrupt business magnate who harvests inhabited planets to create a new one, but destroys the initial planets in the process. His race, the Blarg, have overpopulated and severely polluted their home planet. Clank offers to start Ratchet's ship using his robotic ignition system, and in exchange, Ratchet agrees to take him to the planet Novalis presented in the infobot. Joining forces, the two take out several of Drek's operations one-by-one while gathering gradual information on his plans. These moves enrage Drek, who launches a manhunt for the duo.

Ratchet and Clank seek Captain Qwark (Jim Ward), the Solana Galaxy's most popular superhero and celebrity, for help. Once Ratchet and Clank locate Qwark in his trailer on Planet Rilgar, they agree to meet him at Qwark's private headquarters on Umbris. After surviving his obstacle course, Qwark betrays them, revealing that he has been working for Drek as a highly paid spokesperson for Drek's new planet. Qwark leaves the duo to die in the lair of a Blargian Snagglebeast, which is dispatched by Ratchet. Determined on getting revenge for Qwark's deception, a bitter Ratchet liberates more Blarg-conquered planets, eventually coming across a Blargian moonbase. Qwark, attempting to make sure that the duo does not interfere in Drek's plans, engages them in a space battle that ends with Qwark being shot down and Ratchet and Clank travelling to the planet where he crashed. With his vengeance laid to rest, Ratchet is again motivated to help after seeing the destruction of the planet by Drek's forces, realizing how selfish he's been acting.

Ratchet and Clank fly to Quartu in order to find out about the Blarg's next move. Drek intends to destroy Veldin with a planet-destroying weapon called the Deplanetizer and allow his already-completed planet to take its orbit. Ratchet swears to make Drek pay for his mercilessness. The Blarg and Drek are pursued to Veldin by a vengeful Ratchet, and soon a vicious battle ensues. Once the fight reaches the Deplanetizer, Drek reveals that he deliberately polluted the Blargian homeworld to profit from creating and selling the artificial planet to the Blarg. He intends to repeat the whole process with the new world so he can continue destroying planets and getting rich. After disabling Drek's mech, Ratchet launches Drek to his new planet, which is destroyed when Ratchet fires the Deplanetizer at it. Chunks of the planet begin to impact Veldin's surface, causing the duo to nearly fall to their death. Clank saves Ratchet, however his arm ends up badly damaged, with Ratchet remarking he will be fine and seemingly leaves the scene. A distraught Clank begins to walk away, only for Ratchet to return to take Clank home and repair him. The duo walk home together.

In a post-credits scene, Qwark advertises his "Personal Hygienator", much to Ratchet and Clank's disgust and discomfort, as Clank turns off the Holovision.

== Development ==
After finishing work on the Spyro platform game series on the original PlayStation, Insomniac originally intended to launch a game codenamed I5 (Insomniac game #5) for the PlayStation 2. The developers, however, were never enthusiastic about it, and the idea was dropped after six months. Ratchet & Clank was based on an idea by Brian Hastings, which would feature a space-traveling reptile alien who would collect various weapons as he progressed through the game. Ratchet's final form was decided upon after Insomniac considered a space lizard with a tail and various terrestrial creatures, including dogs and rats; feline features stood out to the developers because of the associated sense of agility. Another early idea was to have three small robots attached to Ratchet, which would perform different functions. However, Insomniac realized that having the robots was both complicated and created confusion about Ratchet's appearance, leading them to have only one robot, Clank. According to an interview, not much was cut but that (according to Insomniac) "Interestingly, we really didn't cut anything except for a few weapons and gadgets that just weren't fun when we prototyped them. There was the Revolverator – a drill gun which would spin enemies around once Ratchet impaled them and the Mackerel 1000 – basically a fish that took the place of the wrench. Both of these got cut because they were either too hard to use or just didn't add anything to the game." The game's script was written by Hastings, Gavin Dodd, John Lally, and Oliver Wade. Hastings was deeply influenced by The Hitchhiker's Guide to the Galaxy books, and liked the idea that "corporations control the galaxy more than any government does" with a "wild west of consumerism and unchecked capitalism where you'll just have a vendor on the street selling conveniently sized atomic weaponry and that's just a normal thing, like a washed up superhero is just hawking gadgets." Pre-production of the game began in late March 2001, with a team of approximately 35 people. The game went into production in November 2001, and by the end of the project, the team had grown to 45.

Shortly after changing the game from I5 to Ratchet & Clank, Naughty Dog asked Insomniac if they would be interested in sharing the game technology used in Naughty Dog's Jak and Daxter: The Precursor Legacy (2001), asking that Insomniac in turn share with them any improvements that were made. Insomniac agreed, resulting in most of the Ratchet & Clank engine technology being developed in-house by Insomniac, but some important renderers were developed by Naughty Dog. Looking back on the agreement, Ted Price said that "Naughty Dog's generosity gave us a huge leg up and allowed us to draw the enormous vistas in the game." Some years later, Ted Price clarified Insomniac's stance on engine technology while obliquely mentioning the shared renderers:

We've always developed all our own technology. It's been a little frustrating in the past for us to hear people say, 'Oh yeah, the Insomniac game is running on the Naughty Dog engine.' People assumed that we were using Naughty Dog's engine for Ratchet, and that was not true. We shared some technology with Naughty Dog way back when, and that was great, but we are a company that puts stock in developing specialized technology and we will continue to do so.

== Release ==
Ratchet & Clank was released in North America on November 6, 2002, and Australia on November 6, 2002. It was released in PAL regions on November 8, 2002, and in Japan on December 3, 2002. In November 2003, Sony added Ratchet & Clank to their Greatest Hits series of games for the PlayStation 2 when Ratchet & Clank: Going Commando was released at that time, and the game was similarly added to Sony's Platinum range used in the PAL region on August 22, 2003. The game was added to Japan's The Best range on July 3, 2003; it was also the only game to be bundled with the PlayStation 2 in Japan.

== Reception ==
Reception

Aggregate score
Aggregator	Score
Metacritic	88/100

Review scores
Publication	Score
AllGame	4/5
Computer and Video Games	8/10
Eurogamer	8/10
Famitsu	34/40
Game Informer	8.75/10
GamePro	4.5/5
GameSpot	9/10
GameSpy	78/100
GameZone	9/10
IGN	9.2/10
Official U.S. PlayStation Magazine	10/10
Gameplanet	4.5/5

By July 2006, Ratchet & Clank had sold 1.1 million copies and earned $31 million in the United States. Next Generation ranked it as the 49th highest-selling game launched for the PlayStation 2, Xbox or GameCube between January 2000 and July 2006 in that country. Combined sales of the Ratchet & Clank series reached 4 million units in the United States by July 2006. As of June 30, 2007, the game sold more than 3.7 million copies worldwide.

Ratchet & Clank was met with positive reviews from critics upon release. After playing a preview of the game, GameSpot described it as having "excellent graphics, varied gameplay, and tight control[s]". The game's use of weapons, rather than simple melee attacks, was cited as one of the main features that made it stand out from other platform games; Computer and Video Games said that "Going berserk with your giant ratchet ... is seriously satisfying ... Every time you thump an enemy with the hefty tool, it looks, sounds and feels remarkably solid. ... What's more, the same can be said for all the other weapons you collect and use over the course of your intergalactic adventure". GameSpot noted that the player does not need to follow the same paths multiple times, as was common in platformers at the time. GameSpot named Ratchet & Clank the best PlayStation 2 game of November 2002; it later won the publication's annual "Best Graphics (Technical) on PlayStation 2" award, and a nomination for "Best Graphics (Artistic) on PlayStation 2". Gameplanet said that it was "Quite simply the best platform game on the PS2 right now and possibly the best on any format!"

Reviewers praised the game's graphics, specifically pointing out the character and background designs as being high-quality for PS2 games of the time. GameSpy called the graphics "mind-blowing", and GameSpot praised the game's smooth frame rate. GameZone noted the animation of Ratchet, praising the details in his animation. Reviewers found that the game's voice-overs and other audio elements were generally well-done. IGN commented on the game's artificial intelligence (AI), saying that it was not as well-done as that of Jak and Daxter: The Precursor Legacy, but still "purposefully comic and somewhat sophisticated" in others. Gameplanet felt that the game's levels were well laid-out.

Criticism was aimed at the game's camera angles, which Eurogamer felt were "idiotic" at times, giving the example of boss fights in which the camera centers on the boss rather than being freely movable. AllGame found that it was hard to form an emotional bond with Ratchet & Clank's main characters, saying that Ratchet is "your typical teenager ... who desires nothing more than excitement and adventure" and that Clank is "the stereotypical intellectual; stuffy and almost prudish to a fault", feeling instead that the characters of Jak and Daxter from Jak and Daxter: The Precursor Legacy were "infinitely more likeable." Some criticism was also aimed at the story, with GameSpy saying that the game became predictable, boring, and "just bland". Reviewers also noted that the first half of the game was "yawn inducing", but once the player reaches planet Rilgar, it becomes much more intense and difficult; GamePro opined that the player does not "engage a single thought process" for the first parts of the game.

== Awards ==
During the 6th Annual Interactive Achievement Awards, the Academy of Interactive Arts & Sciences (AIAS) awarded Ratchet & Clank with "Console Platform Action/Adventure Game of the Year"; it also received nominations for "Game of the Year", "Console Game of the Year", and outstanding achievement in "Animation", "Art Direction", and "Gameplay Engineering".

== Legacy ==
The game was adapted into an animated feature film of the same name, released in April 2016. A remake of the game for the PlayStation 4 was also released to tie in with the film.
