= Outernauts =

2012 video game developed by Insomniac Games

- Outernauts Facebook cover image
- Developer: Insomniac Games
- Publisher: Electronic Arts
- Platforms: Adobe Flash, iOS (February 2014)
- Release: July 2012 (open beta)
- Genres: Role-playing, social network game

Outernauts was an Adobe Flash social role-playing video game for Facebook. Developed by Insomniac Games, it is the developer's first social video game, as well as their first game for a non-PlayStation platform. The game is published by Electronic Arts and was released as an open beta in July 2012. It was announced by Insomniac Games that the game would no longer be available on Facebook from January 31, 2014, and would be ported to iOS. The game was shut down on February 1, 2016.

== Gameplay ==
As Outernauts, players must explore alien planets to capture and nurture creatures with which to do battle, in gameplay similar to the Pokémon series. Player actions are limited by "energy", an in-game resource that accumulates over time, but which can also be purchased with real-world currency.

== Reception ==
The game enjoyed a positive critical response, earning a score of 7/10 from GamesTM and 6/10 from Eurogamer, despite being described by the latter as an "utterly shameless" Pokémon clone.

Critics praised the game's presentation, with Eurogamer noting its "classy cartoon visuals, slick orchestral soundtrack and finely-tuned UI." Eurogamer commented on the size of the game's world, describing how even with a week of play, most of the galaxy map had yet to be unlocked. GamesTM too, praised the game world as "interesting to explore", the characters "providing a sense of unknown that continues to entice".

Inside Social Games compared the depth of Outernauts' gameplay favorably to other social games, but warned that the social viral mechanics, such as "nag screens" and "pay to win" mechanics would ward off the core gamers it set to attract. GamesTM likewise, found the energy system to be the game's biggest hindrance, and one which could frustrate by interrupting gameplay. Despite this, GamesTM concluded that Outernauts was "a step up on most Facebook games".

=== Closure ===
On December 10, 2015, Insomniac removed all microtransaction options from the game, preceding the final shut down of the game on February 1, 2016. Insomniac explained that despite having millions of players since launch, the current player base was too small to profitably sustain the game.
