= Ratchet & Clank (film) =

2016 film by Kevin Munroe

- Theatrical release poster
- Directed by: Kevin Munroe
- Written by: T.J. Fixman; Kevin Munroe; Gerry Swallow
- Based on: Ratchet & Clank by Insomniac Games
- Produced by: Brad Foxhoven; Kim Dent Wilder; David Wohl
- Starring: Paul Giamatti; John Goodman; Bella Thorne; Rosario Dawson; Jim Ward; James Arnold Taylor; David Kaye; Sylvester Stallone
- Cinematography: Anthony Di Ninno
- Edited by: Braden Oberson
- Music by: Evan Wise
- Production companies: Rainmaker Entertainment; Blockade Entertainment; PlayStation Originals; CNHK Media China; Film Financial Services; Original Force; Insomniac Games
- Distributed by: Focus Features (under Gramercy Pictures, United States); Universal Pictures (Canada); Cinema Management Group (International)
- Release dates: April 13, 2016 (France); April 29, 2016 (United States)
- Running time: 94 minutes
- Countries: China; Hong Kong; Canada; United States
- Language: English
- Budget: $20 million
- Box office: $14.4 million

Ratchet & Clank is a 2016 animated science fiction action comedy film based on the Insomniac Games video game series, and directed by Kevin Munroe. James Arnold Taylor and David Kaye reprise their roles as the titular characters from the video games, alongside Jim Ward and Armin Shimerman as their respective characters. The film also stars the voices of Paul Giamatti, John Goodman, Bella Thorne, Rosario Dawson, and Sylvester Stallone.

The film features an original story, loosely based on the 2002 video game with additional elements from its follow-ups, written by Munroe, Gerry Swallow, and former Insomniac senior writer T.J. Fixman, who began writing for the series with the Ratchet & Clank Future saga. Alongside several cast members from the games, Insomniac contributed to the film's production with character development, screenplay, and animation assets.

Ratchet & Clank was released in the United States on April 29, 2016. It received generally negative reviews from critics and was a box-office bomb, grossing $14 million on a $20 million budget. It is the final film by Gramercy Pictures as a label before it was discontinued the second time shortly thereafter. It also ended up being Gramercy's only animated film.

== Plot ==
In the Solana Galaxy, Chairman Drek and his people the Blarg are systemically dismantling multiple planets to extract desirable material for the construction of an artificial planet New Quartu. The Blarg need this new world as their home Quartu has been rendered uninhabitable by pollution. The destruction attracts the attention of the peacekeeping Galactic Rangers. At a factory that produces Drek's warbots on Quartu, a defective warbot is produced due to a blackout and flies to Kerwan to warn the Rangers of Drek's plan. After getting shot down, he meets a young lombax spaceship mechanic, Ratchet, on the planet Veldin. Ratchet names him Clank, and the two fly to Kerwan where they save the Rangers from Drek's army of warbots. Their actions gain both Ratchet and Clank immense popularity, which pressures the leader of the Rangers, Captain Qwark, to recruit them.

Jealous of Ratchet and Clank's acclaim, Qwark is approached by Drek to help him, an offer he accepts so long as Drek never harms the other Rangers. Drek has him disable the Rangers' weapons during an assault on his planet-destroying superweapon, the Deplanetizer. Drek's lieutenant Victor Von Ion boards the Rangers' flagship and attacks Clank, who manages to reduce him to a rusty wreck using a rainstorm-producing weapon. After Drek breaks apart the planet Novalis, his chief scientist Doctor Nefarious (who orchestrated Qwark's betrayal) suddenly fires a sheep transforming gun at Drek, stuffs him in an escape pod, and ejects him to New Quartu. He takes control of the Deplanetizer, intending to destroy the entire Solana Galaxy in revenge for Qwark's mistreatment of him when he was a Ranger. His plan is to destroy the planet Umbris which has a highly unstable core that would annihilate all other planets in its vicinity.

The Rangers attack the Deplanetizer again, but Qwark intercepts and battles Ratchet and Clank. Ratchet pleads with Qwark to stop, causing Qwark to realize he has been used, and the three confront Nefarious. Nefarious fires the laser, but the Rangers move it off towards New Quartu, killing Drek who has crash-landed. Nefarious tries to disintegrate Qwark with his personal weapon, the RYNO (stands for "Rip You a New One"), but is stopped short by Ratchet, causing Nefarious himself to be seemingly disintegrated as he falls into the Deplanetizer's laser chamber. Ratchet, Clank, and Qwark manage to escape through a teleporter as the Deplanetizer falls towards Umbris where it vaporizes in the atmosphere. With Nefarious thwarted, the Rangers return to Kerwan. Qwark is demoted to Private and goes on an apology tour while promoting a book that he wrote, “Listen, I Said I Was Sorry, All Right?”. Ratchet and Clank reunite on Veldin with Ratchet promising to rejoin the Rangers if he is needed. Meanwhile, Nefarious survives on Umbris, having his body forcibly converted into a robotic form to survive.

== Cast ==
- James Arnold Taylor as Ratchet, a young Lombax mechanic who dreams of being a Galactic Ranger. Taylor reprises his role from the games, though the character was voiced by Mikey Kelley in the original game.
- David Kaye as Clank, an intelligent warbot defect who escapes and befriends Ratchet. Kaye reprises his role from the games.
- Paul Giamatti as Chairman Alonzo Drek, the ruthless, eccentric and charismatic leader of the Blarg. He was previously voiced by Kevin Michael Richardson in the original game.
- John Goodman as Grimroth "Grim" Razz, a garage owner on Veldin who is Ratchet's adoptive father and mentor.
- Bella Thorne as Cora Veralux, a rigid Galactic Ranger.
- Rosario Dawson as Elaris, the Rangers' technical support officer.
- Jim Ward as Captain Copernicus Qwark, the egocentric and egotistical leader of the Galactic Rangers and a galaxy-wide celebrity. Ward reprises his role from the games.
- Armin Shimerman as Doctor Steve Nefarious, Drek's evil chief scientist who has a vendetta against Captain Qwark. Shimerman reprises his role from the games.
- Vincent Tong as:
  - Brax Lectrus: a large, reptilian Galactic Ranger.
  - A Solana Trooper
- Andrew Cownden as:
  - Zed, Drek's bumbling assistant whom the Rangers often interrogate.
  - A Blarg.
- Sylvester Stallone as Victor Von Ion, Drek's robotic lieutenant. He is an original character created for the film and inspired by the Robot Lieutenant from the original game who was voiced by Neil Flynn.
- Lee Tockar as Mr. Micron, a Tharpod citizen of Veldin.
- Brian Dobson as:
  - Dallas Wanamaker
  - Announcer
  - Drek's Computer
- Tabitha St. Germain as Juanita Alvaro
- Brad Swaile as:
  - Ollie
  - Superfan
- Brian Drummond as the Zurkons, robotic bodyguards that Drek sends out after the Rangers. They are based on Mr. Zurkon, a weapon from the games, who was previously voiced by Marc Graue.
- Cole Howard as Stanley, a Blarg troop that Drek and Victor Von Ion bust for texting.
- Ian James Corlett as Blarg
- Alessandro Juliani as Solana Trooper
- Rebecca Shoichet as:
  - Stanley's Mom
  - Ship Computer
- Don Briggs as the Starship Commander

== Production ==
The film was produced at Rainmaker Entertainment's Vancouver, Canada studio and executive produced by president Michael Hefferon. Insomniac mentioned they were eager to produce a Ratchet & Clank film adaptation, remarking:

One of the biggest questions we've gotten in the last few years is 'When are you going to make a Ratchet & Clank movie?' The truth is, we've wanted to do a movie for a long time! Ratchet & Clank's action, humor and galaxy-spanning adventures have really been the basis for a fantastic game series, and we think it would translate perfectly to the big screen.

— James Stevenson, Insomniac Community Lead on the PlayStation Blog

== Release ==
=== Theatrical ===
The film was released theatrically in the United States via Gramercy Pictures on April 29, 2016, while it was released internationally by Lionsgate and Cinema Management Group. Insomniac developed a "re-imagined" version of the original Ratchet & Clank game to tie in with the film, which was released on April 12 in North America.

=== Home media ===
The film was released by Universal Pictures Home Entertainment on Digital HD on August 2, 2016, and on Blu-ray and DVD on August 23, 2016.

== Reception ==
=== Box office ===
Ratchet & Clank grossed $8.8 million in North America and $5.6 million in other territories for a worldwide total of $14.4 million, against a production budget of $20 million.

In the United States and Canada, pre-release tracking suggested the film would gross $8–10 million from 2,891 theaters in its opening weekend, trailing fellow newcomers Keanu ($10–14 million projection) and Mother's Day ($11 million projection). The film went on to gross just $4.9 million in its opening weekend, finishing below expectations and 7th at the box office.

Following the domestic opening, Rainmaker announced an impairment charge on their $10 million investment in the film. Commenting on the movie's performance, Hefferon stated "We are obviously disappointed with the North American opening release results. The huge success of The Jungle Book, and continued strength of Zootopia, represented a loss of a large portion of the family market. Although support from the Ratchet & Clank fan base has been positive, the turnout for the film was not sufficient to overcome the highly competitive market place for the opening weekend of the film." In its second weekend, the film grossed just $1.5 million (a drop of 70%), finishing 9th at the box office. Rainmaker lost around $5 million on the film, which made $15 million.

=== Critical response ===
On the review aggregator website Rotten Tomatoes, 22% of 82 critics' reviews are positive, with an average rating of 4.30/10. The website's consensus reads: "Ratchet & Clank may satisfy very young viewers, but compared to the many superior options available to families and animation enthusiasts, it offers little to truly recommend." Metacritic, which uses a weighted average, assigned the film a score of 29 out of 100, based on 19 critics, indicating "generally unfavorable" reviews. Audiences polled by CinemaScore gave the film an average grade of "B" on an A+ to F scale.

Bill Zwecker of the Chicago Sun-Times gave the film 2 out of 4 stars, saying, "I kept getting a sense we've all been here before—both in animated and live-action presentations." IGN gave the film a 6/10, saying, "Ratchet & Clank is not a bad movie by any means, especially when compared to some of the downright-terrible video game adaptations of the past two decades. But given the humor, action and sense of adventure of the games, the movie is ultimately a competent, shallow, disappointing take on the adventures of the plucky Lombax and his robot buddy. My advice is to stick to the stellar PlayStation 4 game." GameSpot gave the film a mixed review, saying, "Ratchet & Clank pulls us across the universe at a breakneck pace, but it never seems to take us anywhere. The series may have found success in video games, but in the meantime, it's merely stumbled into film."

== Animated short ==
In February 2021, an animated short Ratchet & Clank: Life of Pie, was released on Crave TV in Canada. The short was produced by Mainframe Studios in co-operation with PlayStation Originals. James Arnold Taylor, David Kaye, Jim Ward, Armin Shimerman, and Andrew Cownden returned to reprise their roles of Ratchet, Clank, Captain Qwark, Doctor Nefarious and Zed respectively. The short marks Jim Ward's final performance as Qwark, following his retirement from the role due to his diagnosis with Alzheimer's disease, and before his death in 2025. The short was not released in the U.S. or internationally.

== See also ==
- List of films based on video games
