= Disruptor (video game) =

1996 video game

- North American box art
- Developer: Insomniac Games
- Publishers: NA: Universal Interactive Studios; EU: Interplay Productions
- Producer: Michael John
- Designers: Ted Price; Craig Stitt; Alexander Hastings; Brian Hastings
- Programmers: Alexander Hastings; Brian Hastings
- Artists: Ted Price; Craig Stitt; David Ehlers; Travis Price; Martin Bruinsman
- Writer: Peter Hankoff
- Composer: David Bergeaud
- Platform: PlayStation
- Release: NA: November 20, 1996; EU: December 1996
- Genre: First-person shooter
- Mode: Single-player

Disruptor is a 1996 first-person shooter video game developed by Insomniac Games for the PlayStation. It was the first game to be developed by Insomniac Games. The game was distributed by Interplay Productions. It received positive reviews from critics, but was a commercial failure, selling well below the company’s expectations.

== Gameplay ==
Gameplay of Disruptor is similar to many first-person shooters, but the player has access to special powers called "Psionics", similar to psychokinesis. The five psionic powers are:

- Shock – uses 5 psionic points to launch a short-to-medium range electrical jolt to an enemy;
- Drain – uses 1 psionic point to target and weaken an enemy, spamming small orbs that replenish psionic points;
- Heal – a high-cost power that replenishes health;
- Blast – a high-cost destructive ball that deals severe damage and spams psionic-replenishing orbs above slain enemies, it is later upgraded by Eve to pass its destructiveness through walls;
- Shield – a high-cost temporary shield which protects the player.

== Plot ==
Jack Curtis and Troy Alexander, new recruits of the LightStormer Corps, receive psionic implants upon completing their training missions. Through his training performance, Jack has placed comparably to his elder brother and commanding officer Blake Curtis – and their late father, a revered LightStormer who was a personal friend of United Nations President Krieger. Blake gets an emergency call: a crew of Cryo-Pirates have commandeered a space station in Jupiter's orbit. At Blake's orders, Jack goes to the station and activates the self-destruct sequence. A mysterious girl named Eve monitors Jack in action.

President Krieger has taken notice of Jack and ordered an endorphin boost for him. They talk briefly with Troy, who is being sent on a "special assignment" by President Krieger. Another emergency call comes in, this time from Triton, one of Neptune's moons, where a colony of scientists was established ten years ago to terraform the moon. The colony has been overrun by hostile aliens, so Jack is dispatched to eradicate them. Returning from Triton, Jack learns that Troy has been killed in action on Mars while attempting to locate a mysterious psionic orb. Blake hopes Jack will succeed where Troy failed. Jack comes through, despite having little more than his psionics to fight with.

Jack is unhappy that he is not allowed some R&R to clear his head given the orb's vast enhancement of his psionic abilities. Blake reminds him that President Krieger has final say on all such decisions. Jack is sent to Antarctica to wipe out the test subjects recovered from the Triton incident that got loose and stole a batch of Cyclone weapons. Jack's objective is to retrieve their genetic databank. After this, Jack is sent to Jupiter's moon Io, retaking the colony from Jovian gangsters who commandeered a sulfate mine and production plant. President Krieger personally congratulates Jack upon his triumphant return. He then dispatches Jack to New Atlantis, to join Blake for some R&R. Blake calls in from New Atlantis. The colony has been overrun with hostile mechs and a reactor coolant leak is about to destroy the whole place.

Jack rushes over, outfights the mechs and kicks in the backup coolant to find it disabled. New Atlantis explodes, killing Blake and thousands of innocents. Jack alone survives because Eve beamed him out. She explains that President Krieger used Jack to locate and bring back the psionic orb and the Triton alien soldiers' genetic databank, because this will give him all but unlimited psionic power and a private military company staffed with physically superior extraterrestrial soldiers. Eve is the head of the rebel faction the Alliance Of Democracy, which is attempting to overthrow Krieger's presidency and replace it with their own regime. She convinces Jack of their cause. Jack takes on Krieger's private army as he infiltrates the president's headquarters, but he is captured by a teleporter in his office and restrained to a chair.

Krieger is unnerved by Jack's flippant defiance and reveals Jack's father got wise to Krieger's pursuit of the orb and threatened to expose his then commanding officer, prompting Krieger to send a group of "terrorists" to kill Jack's father. Krieger uses his Extractor torture device to try to retrieve the Terrablast implant from Jack's skull while putting him under an induced hallucinatory nightmare to erode his will. Jack resists and battles his way free of the hallucinations. He then storms through Krieger's secret base and the president's forces, at last taking out Krieger. There are two different endings depending on the difficulty level. In regular mode, Eve becomes President of the U.N., and Jack head of the LightStormer Corps. In hard mode, Jack himself becomes the U.N.'s new president.

== Development ==
Disruptor started its development as a 3DO game, since the 3DO was the only commercially viable CD-based console at the time, and development kits for it were available at very low prices. According to Ted Price, Insomniac presented Disruptor to virtually every available publisher, being rejected by each one, before Universal Interactive agreed to adopt the game.

Midway through development, it became apparent that the 3DO would not be a success, and the alternative platforms Sega Saturn and Sony PlayStation became available, leading Universal to recommend switching Disruptor to the PlayStation. Universal's executive producer Mark Cerny nonetheless saw the 3DO as a key step towards the game's arrival, remarking, "The whole reason Disruptor exists is because an enthusiastic hobbyist could start development on 3DO, since it had cheap development hardware. We saw the prototype running on 3DO and agreed to fund development on PlayStation."

After Universal Interactive took on publication, Insomniac had a six month deadline to deliver their first playable build of the game. As the novice developer struggled to meet this deadline, Universal offered Insomniac Games free office space in their Los Angeles headquarters, which gave them easy access to equipment and advice from Universal's more experienced developers.

== Reception ==
Reception

Review scores
Publication	Score
AllGame	3.5/5
Computer and Video Games	3/5
Electronic Gaming Monthly	7.5/10
GameSpot	7/10
IGN	8/10
Next Generation	4/5

Disruptor was well received at the time of its release, with a GameRankings score of 80% based on six reviews. Critics widely praised the unique and impressive weapons, the challenging and strategic gunplay, the clean and sharp graphics, the situation-sensitive soundtrack, and the variety of mission objectives and level environments. Crispin Boyer of Electronic Gaming Monthly called it "the best-looking 3-D game on the PlayStation." GamePro's Scary Larry said that the scarce supply of ammunition and the need for precision aiming might make the game dauntingly difficult for beginners at the genre, but that the gameplay was compelling enough that even those who do not enjoy the challenge would be drawn back to it. A reviewer for Next Generation concluded, "Well-balanced, with good control, nice graphics, on-the-fly strategy, secret areas, and good sound, Disruptor gives the player everything new that it can within a genre saturated with mediocrity." IGN said that the game was above average for the Doom clones seen on the PlayStation.

=== Sales ===
The game sold about 200,000 copies, and was considered a commercial disappointment.
