= Ratchet & Clank: Going Commando =

2003 video game

- North American box art
- Developer: Insomniac Games
- Publisher: Sony Computer Entertainment
- Designer: Brian Allgeier
- Programmers: Alexander Hastings; Brian Hastings
- Artists: John Fiorito; Dave Guertin; Greg Baldwin
- Writers: Oliver Wade; John Lally
- Composers: David Bergeaud; Niels Bye Nielsen (additional music)
- Series: Ratchet & Clank
- Platform: PlayStation 2
- Release: NA: November 11, 2003; PAL: November 21, 2003
- Genres: Third-person shooter, platform
- Mode: Single-player

Ratchet & Clank: Going Commando (known as Ratchet & Clank 2: Locked and Loaded in Australia and most PAL countries) is a 2003 third-person shooter platform video game developed by Insomniac Games and published by Sony Computer Entertainment for the PlayStation 2. It is the second game in the Ratchet & Clank series, following Ratchet & Clank (2002). David Kaye reprises his role as Clank while James Arnold Taylor replaces Mikey Kelley as Ratchet.

The game follows Ratchet & Clank, joined by newcomer Angela Cross, as they attempt to unravel a conspiracy in a new galaxy involving a mysterious "pet project" orchestrated by the shadowy MegaCorp. Similarly to the original Ratchet & Clank, the player-controls protagonists from a third-person perspective. The player progresses through the story by using various weapons and gadgets to defeat enemies and solve puzzles, while exploring planets, completing platforming sections and minigames. The game features many improvements over the original game, such as the aesthetics and introduces many new gameplay aspects, such as weapon upgrading.

Released roughly a year after the original game, Going Commando received critical acclaim and has frequently been listed as one of the best PlayStation 2 games. Most critics felt that it was superior to its predecessor and praised the game's graphics, gameplay, story, characterization and sound, although some criticized its unforgiving difficulty and minigames. It was followed by Ratchet & Clank: Up Your Arsenal (2004).

A high-definition remaster developed by Idol Minds for the PlayStation 3 was included as part of the Ratchet & Clank Collection in 2012, which consists of remasters of the first three games of the series originally developed for the PlayStation 2. A port of the remaster developed by Mass Media for the PlayStation Vita was released in 2014.

== Gameplay ==
Ratchet makes use of the Blitz Gun to defeat enemies. The current ammunition is visible in the top left of the HUD.

The player controls Ratchet from a third-person perspective and uses various weapons to defeat enemies. The player can also use gadgets, such as the Gravity Boots and Dynamo, to explore certain areas. The player travels to planets in the "Bogon" Galaxy and completes main objectives as well as optional side quests. Bolts, the game world's currency, are primarily obtained by defeating enemies and breaking crates located throughout the game's levels. Going Commando includes four types of "maxi-games", or minigames. These games include arena battles, spherical world battles, hoverbike races, and space races/battles. After completing the game, the player may enter challenge mode, which is more difficult, but the player starts with the weapons and health that they had when they finished the game the first time, and additional weapon upgrades are unlocked.

Going Commando introduces eighteen weapons, including the Blitz Gun, Bouncer and Lava Gun. Each weapon has a "growth bar", which increases when the weapon is used to defeat enemies. The weapon is upgraded once the bar is filled, increasing its power and changing the design of it. Certain devices from the original Ratchet & Clank make a return, such as the Swingshot, while others are new to Going Commando. The player can use a savefile from the original Ratchet & Clank to get "retro" weapons from the first game for free, although these weapons do not upgrade.

As with weapons, Ratchet gains experience with each enemy he defeats. When Ratchet's experience bar fills, he gains a new level of nanotech. This awards him with additional health bubbles, up to a maximum of 80 can be obtained. Ratchet's health can also be increased by finding nanotech upgrades. The game introduces armor vendors, which are able to provide up to four additional levels of protection.

== Plot ==
After saving the Solana Galaxy from the menace of Chairman Drek, (Note: As depicted in Ratchet & Clank (2002)) Ratchet (James Arnold Taylor) and Clank (David Kaye) become celebrities, though their lives remain otherwise uneventful. After giving an interview for the holovision show Behind the Hero, the pair suddenly find themselves teleported into a spaceship sent by Abercrombie Fizzwidget (Jim Ward), the founder and CEO of MegaCorp, the Bogon Galaxy's largest maker of consumer goods and electronics, who requests Ratchet's help to recover a stolen biological experiment from a masked thief, while offering Clank employment in the company, both of whom agree to the opportunities offered. Upon completing an extensive training regime en route to the galaxy, Ratchet is tasked with travelling to a flying laboratory on planet Aranos where the experiment was last seen, but before he can retrieve it, the thief manages to escape with it. Reporting back to Fizzwidget, Ratchet soon begins pursuing the thief, only to receive a video message showing that the culprit has captured Clank in an attempt to deter Ratchet from his mission.

After saving Clank from the thief's clutches, the reunited duo work together to pursue the thief across several planets, dealing with mercenaries hired from Thugs-4-Less to protect the thief, leading to a confrontation on planet Siberius. Although the thief escapes from them after a fight, Ratchet & Clank secure the experiment, and arrange a meeting with Fizzwidget so that he can reclaim it. During the handover, Fizzwidget "accidentally" maroons the duo in a network of caves on the desert planet Tabora. After making their escape, the pair are confronted by the thief, who accidentally exposes "his" true identity: a female Lombax named Angela Cross (Kath Soucie), who used to work for MegaCorp as a scientist. Warning the pair that the experiment is a threat to the entire galaxy, Angela gives them the location of a testing facility on planet Dobbo where it was created, and advises them to seek out the evidence that confirms her story. Following her lead, the duo infiltrate the facility and discover a video recording that reveals the experiment to be highly dangerous and capable of going into a murderous rampage. Shortly afterwards, Angela contacts the pair and reveals that MegaCorp has duplicated the experiment and intends to sell them as a new product called the "Protopet".

Convinced that Fizzwidget is unaware of the Protopet's flaws, Ratchet & Clank go to warn him during a promotionary event being held on planet Boldan, only to discover it to be a trap by the Thugs-4-Less boss (Steve Blum), their contract with Angela having been bought out by MegaCorp. Captured, the pair find themselves transported to Aranos and aboard the same vessel, now being used as a remote prison, but manage to escape confinement. Discovering that Angela was captured by them as well, the pair track the mercenaries to their hideout on planet Snivelak, defeating their boss and saving Angela. Intent on stopping Fizzwidget, the group head for MegaCorp's Headquarters on planet Yeedil, only to discover that "Fizzwidget" is none other than disgraced hero Captain Qwark (also Ward) in disguise. Having trapped the real Fizzwidget in a supply closet and stolen his identity, Qwark unleashed the Protopet upon the galaxy so that he can use a device created by Angela to defeat the creatures and restore his former reputation, while framing Ratchet, Clank, and Angela for his crimes. When he demonstrates the device, however, it malfunctions and transforms the original Protopet into a gigantic beast that devours him. While Angela goes to rescue the real Fizzwidget, Ratchet subdues the Protopet, saving Qwark's life. With Clank's help, Angela fixes the device and broadcasts a signal through MegaCorp's TV transponders, neutralizing the Protopets and restoring peace to the Bogon Galaxy.

In a mid-credits scene, Ratchet, Clank, and Angela hang out at Clank's apartment, where Angela informs them that Qwark has been assigned work as a test subject for the "Crotchetizer" at MegaCorp as punishment for his crimes.

== Development and release ==
Going Commando was approved for development five months before the first game's release, after highly positive reviews from the original's playtesters. In August 2002, Insomniac Games started designing the visual concepts for Going Commando, while still fixing bugs in the original game. Brian Hastings, Insomniac's Vice President of Programming, said in a 2003 interview that the first step in the game's design was to "try to come up with a few 'Big Ideas'. These are the things we think will really grab people's attention and give the game that Wow-Factor. In the case of Ratchet & Clank: Going Commando the big ideas were RPG elements (like weapon upgrades and health upgrades), spherical planets and space combat." Hastings said that the inspiration for the game's spherical worlds came in part from the cover of the novella The Little Prince (1943) by French writer Antoine de Saint-Exupéry. Designing the spherical worlds required changing about 50,000 lines of the game's code, to account for the different handling of gravity. Development took a total of ten months, during which time Insomniac's design team doubled from 40 to 80 members.

One common criticism of the original Ratchet & Clank was the personality of Ratchet, who was depicted as quite abrasive and arrogant while less devoted to his friendship to Clank. Ted Price, the game's producer, said that to fix this they made Ratchet "less cocky, he is much more friendly to Clank, and he's able to handle himself better in stressful situations without being impetuous, which is what he was in Ratchet 1." In addition, James Arnold Taylor replaces Mikey Kelley as the character's voice actor, providing a more mature-sounding voice. The return of Captain Qwark was a late addition to the game. The story was written by lead animators Oliver Wade and John Lally.

Going Commando was released in North America on November 11, 2003, Europe on November 21, 2003, and Japan on December 11, 2003. In 2004, Sony added Going Commando to their Greatest Hits series of games for the PlayStation 2, and it was similarly added to the Platinum range used in the PAL region on August 13, 2004, and to the Japanese list of The Best games on July 8, 2004. As of June 30, 2007, the game sold almost 3 million copies worldwide.

== Reception ==
Reception

Aggregate score
Aggregator	Score
Metacritic	90/100

Review scores
Publication	Score
1Up.com	A
Eurogamer	9/10
Game Informer	9.5/10
GamePro	4.5/5
GameSpot	8.8/10
GameSpy	4/5
GameZone	9.4/10
IGN	9.4/10

Awards
Publication	Award
IGN	Top 25 PS2 Games of All Time (11th)
IGN	Game of the Month (November 2003)

Going Commando received critical acclaim. 1UP.com said that "Everything that Ratchet & Clank did, Going Commando does better, and the tweaks and additions just push it further over the top." Game Informer's Andy McNamara said that the game has "the best and most compelling content [Insomniac] has put out to date."

The game's arena combat and racing levels were praised by Andrew Reiner of Game Informer, and Benjamin Turner of GameSpy similarly said that "it's surprising how fun it can be to play interstellar gladiator." GamePro praised the game's pacing, saying that the first game felt like it didn't "really show its true colors until about halfway through", but that Going Commando had the same feeling by the end of the second level. GameSpot mentioned that the "great sense of humor" of the original game is also noticeable in Ratchet & Clank: Going Commando, a statement echoed by GameZone when they said that the game's cut-scenes "represent some of the most thought-out and gut-wrenchingly funny sequences ever witnessed in a platforming game."

Going Commando's graphics were praised by reviewers, who specifically mentioned Ratchet's improved character design. Game Informer said that "the graphical details will leave you speechless ..." GameSpot considered the reuse of graphics for the menus and mission screens to be "a little lazy", but praised the graphics and sound effects of the game's weapons. GameSpy mentioned that "Going Commando is easily the most graphically impressive platformer on the market". GameZone reported that the game's sound was well-done, including the music, weapon effects, and dialogue.

Criticism of the game was aimed at its level of difficulty, which is considerably higher than that of its predecessor; 1UP.com mentioned that this was most noticeable near the end of the game, where "there are levels that consist of nothing but wave after wave of difficult enemies thrown at you to deplete your ammo, and then more waves of enemies after that." GameSpy, however, praised this aspect of the game, saying that it made Going Commando more interesting than the original. Some reviewers also felt that the game's space combat was poorly done in comparison to the rest of the game, and that the "Giant Clank" levels were "brainless and boring".

The game was awarded 11th place on IGN's 2007 list of "The Top 25 PS2 Games of All Time". IGN also awarded both Going Commando and Final Fantasy X-2 their Game of the Month award for November 2003 in their first "Game of the Month" feature to cover two games.

While the first Ratchet and Clank suffered, in my opinion, because of its immensely generic homogenization of character and because of its relative ease, Ratchet and Clank Going Commando tries to solve these problems in typical Insomniac fashion. Ratchet too annoying? Let him grow up and take charge. Game too easy? Increase the quantity and kinds of weapons for Ratchet and for the enemies. But Insomniac didn't just fix problems. It looked at every detail of the first game and from the ground up improved everything wholesale. It upgraded everything, and then it added new stuff. ... Throughout its core fabric, Going Commando is improved in every way.

— Douglass C. Perry

During the 7th Annual Interactive Achievement Awards, the Academy of Interactive Arts & Sciences (AIAS) nominated Going Commando for "Game of the Year", "Console Game of the Year", "Console Platform Action/Adventure Game of the Year", and outstanding achievements in "Animation", "Art Direction", "Character or Story Development", and "Visual Engineering".
