= Stormland (video game) =

- Developer: Insomniac Games
- Publisher: Oculus Studios
- Designer: Mike Daly
- Platform: Microsoft Windows
- Release: November 14, 2019
- Genre: Action-adventure
- Modes: Single-player, multiplayer

Stormland is a 2019 action-adventure game developed by Insomniac Games and published by Oculus Studios for the Oculus Rift virtual reality (VR) headset. The game put emphasis on both exploration and combat as the player character, an android gardener named Vesper, traverses an alien planet from a first-person perspective. The game received generally positive reviews from critics upon release.

== Gameplay ==
The game is an action-adventure game played from a first-person perspective. In the game, the player controls Vesper, an android gardener who was taking care of an alien planet until it was shot by an alien faction named The Tempest. The player's main goal is to take revenge on the Tempest by constructing a new body and collect upgrades. The game features an open world that the player can freely explore. Vesper is equipped with various gadgets that aid exploration and climbing, such as the Slipstream Thruster, which is a jetpack that allows players to rocket through the game's environments. The android is equipped with a variety of futuristic weapons such as SMG and shotguns to defeat enemies. Once an enemy is defeated, they will drop scrap resources than can be used to craft weapon upgrades. After the player finishes the game's story, the game entered a mode named Cycling World, in which the game's locations and missions are reset every week via procedural generation. The game can also be played cooperatively with other players.

== Development ==
The exploration aspect of the game was inspired by The Legend of Zelda: Breath of the Wild, while the combat component was inspired by Insomniac's own Ratchet & Clank series and Sunset Overdrive. Insomniac had previously developed three VR games, including Edge of Nowhere, Feral Rites and The Unspoken, and the studio hoped to apply their experience working on these games into Stormland. According to Chad Dezern, Insomniac's Chief Creative Officer, the game "[stays] in first-person from start to finish" to avoid taking agency away from players, while Mike Daly, the game's lead designer, stated that the Cycling World mode was designed to "[sustain] a player’s interest perpetually".

Publisher Oculus Studios had high hope for the title as the game was significantly different from other major Oculus games, which were mainly arcade game or story-focused experiences. Oculus announced the game on June 7, 2018 and released the game on November 14, 2019 for its VR headset Oculus Rift.

== Reception ==
Reception

Aggregate score
Aggregator	Score
Metacritic	81/100

Review scores
Publication	Score
IGN	7.8/10
Jeuxvideo.com	16/20
PC Gamer (US)	76/100
Road to VR	9/10

Stormland received generally positive reviews from critics upon release according to review aggregator website Metacritic. For IGN, Gabriel Moss wrote that the story was "decently told" though it was not the game's "main draw". However, he noted that he was impressed by the game's movement mechanics and world design. Meanwhile, Samuel Horti from PC Gamer praised the game's combat system, though he disliked the quest structure for being too repetitive.

During the 23rd Annual D.I.C.E. Awards, the Academy of Interactive Arts & Sciences nominated Stormland for "Immersive Reality Technical Achievement".
