= Edge of Nowhere =

2016 video game

- Developer: Insomniac Games
- Publisher: Oculus Studios
- Director: Brian Allgeier
- Composer: Michael Bross
- Engine: Insomniac Engine
- Platform: Microsoft Windows
- Release: June 6, 2016
- Genres: Survival horror, action-adventure
- Mode: Single-player

Edge of Nowhere is an action-adventure virtual reality video game developed by Insomniac Games and published by Oculus Studios. The player controls adventurer Victor Howard as he ventures into Antarctica in order to find his fiancée's lost expedition while encountering unworldly beasts. Edge of Nowhere is based on the work of H. P. Lovecraft, At the Mountains of Madness. The game released on June 6, 2016, exclusively for the Oculus Rift virtual reality headset on Microsoft Windows.

== Plot ==
Victor Howard (based on William Dyer) is searching for his fiancé, Ava Thorne, who is part of a lost expedition in Antarctica. His plane crashes near the shore, killing his co-pilot and leaving him stranded. As he ventures deeper into a dark monstrous world, reality twists and warps around him. Desperate to find the one he loves, Victor must encounter disturbing creatures and climb sheer cliff walls as he descends further into madness from the Great Old Ones that hide deep in the mountain range.

== Gameplay ==
The player climbing up a wall using ice axes

In Edge of Nowhere, the player controls the protagonist Victor Howard (voiced by Robin Atkin Downes) throughout his journey to find his fiancée, Ava Thorne (voiced by Chantelle Barry) who, along with the rest of her scientific expedition, went missing.

The game takes place from the third person, with the camera following behind Victor. Besides controlling the camera, head tracking is used to move the direction of the flashlight and to aim weapons. An Xbox Controller is used as the main method of input for the game, as the title precedes the Oculus Touch controllers. Stealth sections are present, the player must avoid Lovecraftian creatures by staying out of their paths or using objects like stones to distract them. The game features numerous climbing sequences, either requiring the use of ice axes to scale walls, or climbing on marked ledges to reach the top.

== Development ==
In an interview the CEO of Insomniac Games, he discussed the collaborative process with Oculus Studios, saying that "They'll give us research that they've created by taking people through various iterations of our games and another games, and they'll share those findings with us and we apply them in our designs." The developers faced challenges with camera movement specifically, as they couldn't move it too fast otherwise the player might become motion-sick.

Designing areas was also a challenge, as they had to be laid out in a way that didn't make the camera go up or backwards too much to avoid player discomfort. The controls had to be simplified with a developer stating "When you're wearing a headset you can't see the controller that you're holding in your hand, so you have to be a little bit more thoughtful about how you lay out your buttons on the controller and what you ask players to do in your game".

The Antarctic setting was chosen as it allowed for the heavy use of fog and other stylized elements in order to reach a high framerate necessary for virtual reality.

As for music, the composer for the game, Michael Bross mentioned some of the differences in scoring a virtual reality game, "there are differences in how the music itself can be mixed and presented in the game. With VR, we have an opportunity to make the music more immersive in a way where it envelops the player, not just in a horizontal space but also in a vertical sense."

== Reception ==
Reception

Aggregate score
Aggregator	Score
Metacritic	71/100

Review scores
Publication	Score
4Players	75%
Destructoid	6.5/10
Eurogamer	(Recommended)
Game Informer	7.5/10
GameSpot	8/10
IGN	6.7/10
Jeuxvideo.com	16/20
PC Gamer (UK)	58%
Polygon	7.5/10

Edge of Nowhere received "mixed or average reviews" according to the review aggregation website Metacritic.

Peter Brown, writing for GameSpot, praised the immersive quality that virtual reality brought to the game, writing, "Edge of Nowhere is a third-person experience, but being enveloped in a headset, cut off from the real world, makes the sense of being consumed by darkness and tight-spaces feel eerily convincing". However, he criticized the storage limits on ammunition in the game "when I can't pick up a cache of shotgun ammo lying in an abandoned camp because I'm already carrying four shells... I'm brought back to reality; I'm playing a video game that unreasonably limits my abilities in order to inflate tension".

Game Informer's Jeff Cork liked the game's use of virtual reality to create a sense of scale for the game, "Drops of a few hundred feet aren't uncommon, and looking down from a precipice is exhilarating". While Cork praised the enemy variety, he criticized the game's implementation of stealth. "Monsters have a knack for getting randomly alerted, however, which gets frustrating. That makes navigating the stealth in some of the cave networks tricky, since it's hard to get a solid sense of your position in the world; you can't simply rotate the camera."

In a mixed review for Destructoid, Jed Whitaker criticized the game's overreliance on climbing walls, saying it wasn't interesting and that Edge of Nowhere devoted too much time to the mechanic over its brief runtime. He enjoyed the hallucination sections from the game "While it isn't exactly all that original, I found it to be the best part of the game." He was mixed on the use of virtual reality, feeling that the surround sound helped the game create tension, but that it was difficult to move the camera quickly due to the weight of the headset.
