= Ratchet: Deadlocked =

2005 video game

- North American PlayStation 2 box art
- Developer: Insomniac Games
- Publisher: Sony Computer Entertainment
- Director: Brian Hastings
- Designers: Michael Stout; Troy Dunniway; Cory Stockton
- Programmer: Keith Lee
- Writer: Brian Hastings
- Composer: David Bergeaud
- Series: Ratchet & Clank
- Platforms: PlayStation 2 PlayStation 3
- Release: PlayStation 2: NA: October 25, 2005; EU: November 18, 2005; AU: November 24, 2005; PlayStation 3: NA: May 21, 2013; EU: September 25, 2013
- Genres: Third-person shooter, platform
- Modes: Single-player, multiplayer

Ratchet: Deadlocked (known as Ratchet: Gladiator in Europe and Australia) is a 2005 third-person shooter platform video game developed by Insomniac Games and published by Sony Computer Entertainment for the PlayStation 2. It is the fourth installment of the Ratchet & Clank series. The game's story begins as Ratchet, Clank, and Al are abducted and forced to compete in "DreadZone", a violent game show in which heroes are forced to kill each other. Ratchet is given a "DeadLock" collar, which will explode if he becomes uncooperative or boring. The three must find a way to deactivate the collars and free the other heroes being held prisoner.

The gameplay is similar to that of other games in the series, but focuses more on shooter aspects rather than platforming. The player, as Ratchet, fights in DreadZone tournaments across the "Shadow Sector" in the "Solana" Galaxy, with a large variety of weapons. This game was the first in the series to feature cooperative gameplay in a story mode, and also includes an online multiplayer mode. Some vehicles return from previous games, and new ones are introduced. For the first time, Clank (in his typical form) was not a playable character.

Deadlocked was met with generally favorable reviews and was a commercial success, selling 2.1 million copies by 2007. A high-definition remaster developed by Idol Minds was released for the PlayStation 3 in 2013, separate from the Ratchet & Clank Collection.

== Gameplay ==
The gameplay of Deadlocked is similar to that of previous Ratchet & Clank games, with a combination of shooting, action, and platforming, although it emphasizes more on the combat aspects of the series, with little platforming. Deadlocked was the first game in the Ratchet and Clank series to contain an adjustable difficulty level, and is the first to have a cooperative story mode with two players.

The player controls Ratchet from a third-person perspective, although first-person play is possible, while competing in missions and tournaments, defeating enemies, and occasionally controlling vehicles. "Combat bots", two robots which follow the player in most missions, give Ratchet extra firepower, and perform several tasks for him, such as planting explosives and hacking orbs. Combat bots can be upgraded and given new paint schemes, head designs, and weaponry. After completing missions, the player is awarded a certain amount of "Dreadpoints" and bolts, the game's form of currency. Bolts can also be obtained by defeating enemies, or by locating hidden "Jackpot" crates across planets. Certain amounts of "Dreadpoints" are required to unlock new planets, and affect Ratchet's leaderboard rank amongst other contestants of DreadZone.

There are ten weapons in Deadlocked, fewer than most other games in the series. However, weapons can now be extensively modified using a large range of "Alpha" and "Omega" mods, which improve weapon abilities. Alpha mods improve statistics such as rate-of-fire and ammunition capacity, while Omega mods add a secondary effect to the weapons, such as napalm, or the ability to freeze enemies upon impact. While Alpha mods can be equipped on any weapon, some Omega mods aren't compatible with certain weapons; for example, napalm is only usable on weapons with explosive ammunition. As the player progresses, more weapons and mods become available, such as the "Arbiter", a rocket launcher, and the "Scorpion Flail", a powerful melee weapon. Weapons and mods are purchased from vendors using bolts, which also sell ammunition. As weapons gain experience, they will upgrade to more powerful versions, and to a maximum level of 10 (99 in challenge mode). The game's health system, Nanotech, can also be upgraded through garnering experience by defeating enemies, and reaches a maximum level of 100 (999 in challenge mode). Whenever the player takes damage, it can be partially restored by breaking Nanotech crates. In total, the game contains a maximum of 165 skill points which also reward bolts, and many extras which can be unlocked by performing certain feats.

Clank, Ratchet's robotic best friend, is only a playable character if his skin is unlocked, and cannot be used as a jet pack device by Ratchet, unlike older games. Instead, he acts as mission control, giving the player advice during gameplay. A skin for a second player in cooperative mode, however, named "Alpha Clank", is used by default, but can be changed.

In cooperative mode, the second player takes the place of the combat bots. The bot's gadgets can then be used by the players instead, when necessary. Players in cooperative mode must share weapons and ammunition supply, and as a result, both players cannot use the same weapon at the same time.

There are 4 usable vehicles throughout Deadlocked. The "Hovership", a laser equipped aircraft, the "Puma", a type of armored car, and the "Landstalker", essentially a large platform with four spider-like mechanical legs and weapons, can all be used by two players simultaneously at any time. The "Hoverbike", a hovering vehicle used for both racing and combat, can only be used by one player.

After completing the game, the player may choose to enter "challenge mode". In challenge mode, weapons can be upgraded further, more mods can be purchased, and additional "extras" are made available such as a new difficulty level which is even harder than the previously available toughest difficulty.

The game also features online and local multiplayer modes. Up to 4 players may play locally in offline multiplayer matches, and 10 in online matches. The online mode supports a USB Keyboard and a USB Headset, and all the levels from single player are available in the multiplayer mode. Players can play in "Conquest" mode, in which teams try to capture territory, "Deathmatch" mode, where players gain points by killing each other, "Capture the Flag" mode, where up to four teams attempt to capture their opponent's flags, "King of the Hill" mode, where players gain points by staying in a holographic circle, and "Juggernaut" mode, similar to deathmatch, but where one player has vastly improved abilities until they are killed, in which the player that defeated them gains the power.

== Plot ==
Following the events of Up Your Arsenal (2004), Ratchet, Clank and Big Al have been given the job of running the Starship Phoenix. After the crew are informed that many heroes have disappeared, robot troops overrun the Phoenix, taking Ratchet, Clank, and Al captive.

They are transported to the Shadow Sector, a lawless region of space on the edge of the Solana Galaxy. Ratchet meets Gleeman Vox, the creator of DreadZone, a barbaric game show in which contestants are forced to kill each other for public entertainment. Ratchet is forced to compete in DreadZone, and is fitted with a "DeadLock" collar which will explode if he becomes uncooperative or boring. Collectively referred to as "Team DarkStar", Ratchet and his combat bots, Merc and Green must fight for their lives while Clank serves as Ratchet's "Mission Engineer".

Ratchet competes in a variety of DreadZone challenges, defeating Vox's personal gladiator team "the Exterminators" along the way, quickly becoming DreadZone's most popular contestant despite Vox's numerous slander campaigns against him, leaving DreadZone's previous star, Ace Hardlight jealous. Ratchet is eventually sent to compete against Ace, who Ratchet defeats. As Ratchet leaves, Ace tells him to not let Vox corrupt him. Afterwards, Vox offers to make Ratchet a new Exterminator and turn him into DreadZone's superstar, but he is enraged when Ratchet refuses and decides to have him participate in an arena scientifically proven to be unbeatable, which he narrowly wins.

Meanwhile, Clank devises a plan to escape from the DreadZone facility by reprogramming the arena transport pod to take Ratchet to the station's control level. Here, he can destroy the central computer and deactivate the containment field holding all of the heroes hostage.

Upon his arrival at the control level, Ratchet discovers that Vox has wired the station to explode, and if Ratchet cannot deactivate the explosives, everyone there will die. Running a massive gauntlet of enemies and destroying the station's power generators, Ratchet deactivates the containment fields and unlocks the station's escape shuttles. After being defeated by Ratchet, Vox manually activates the station's self-destruct sequence, planning to kill both himself and Ratchet.

The last shuttle, however, piloted by Al, swoops in to rescue Ratchet. Ratchet climbs aboard and Clank removes his DeadLock collar. The DreadZone station explodes soon afterwards, taking Vox with it. After the credits, Doctor Nefarious and his butler, Lawrence make a cameo appearance, still trapped on an asteroid. Nefarious states that they were supposed to be coming in range of a space station, to which Lawrence retorts he had no idea it was going to explode. Nefarious gets angry and short-circuits, and a clip from the soap opera Lance and Janice plays as the game ends. Afterwards it is informed that The Plumber was unable to make an appearance in the game "due to a sump dump on the Rygyllian Nebula".

== Development and release ==
After the completion of Up Your Arsenal, Insomniac thought of ways they could advance the series further for the fourth game to stand out. For about a month and a half, they worked on RCR: Ratchet Racing, a vehicular combat game similar to the Twisted Metal series; when the team found out about Naughty Dog's Jak X: Combat Racing (2005), another vehicular combat game, they cancelled RCR to avoid competition. They then started developing a title called Ratchet & Clank: Nexus (unrelated to 2013's Ratchet & Clank: Into the Nexus), with Ratchet and Clank on a single planet in the midst of a global conflict between two alien races, which in turn causes tension between the two as they have differing views on the matter taking place. This project would later change direction to become Deadlocked, featuring a darker story inspired primarily by the Halo franchise. Ratchet: Deadlocked was revealed at Santa Monica Studio's pre-E3 event in April 2005, then further shown at E3 2005.

Deadlocked was released in North America on October 25, 2005, and in Japan on November 23, 2005. It was released as Ratchet: Gladiator in Europe, Australia and Africa on November 18, 2005, and November 24, 2005, respectively. The PlayStation 2 online servers were terminated on June 28, 2012.

A high-definition remaster of Deadlocked on PlayStation 3 was developed for release on the PlayStation Network (PSN) since the game was not available on the Ratchet & Clank Collection, which only featured Deadlocked's three predecessors. Those who have purchased Full Frontal Assault received the HD remastered game for free on May 21 as an apology due to the long-awaited PlayStation Vita (PS Vita) version of Full Frontal Assault. The online servers for the PlayStation 3 version were terminated on February 15, 2018, along with Up Your Arsenal on the PS3 the same day. In late-2020, the servers were revived by fans of the series.

== Reception ==
Reception

Aggregate score
Aggregator	Score
Metacritic	81/100

Review scores
Publication	Score
1Up.com	B+
Computer and Video Games	8.0/10
Eurogamer	7/10
GamePro	4.5/5
GameSpot	8.6/10
GameSpy	4/5
GameZone	8.8/10
IGN	8.8/10

The game was generally met with positive reviews. In 2006, Deadlocked was added to Sony's Greatest Hits range for North America. It was similarly added to Sony's Platinum range for PAL regions on May 12, 2006, and to Japan's The Best range on June 29, 2006.

As of June 30, 2007, the game sold more than 2.1 million copies worldwide.
