= Characters of the Jak and Daxter series =

Jak (left), with Daxter perched on his left shoulder, in a conversation with Damas (right)

This is a list of characters in the Jak and Daxter series, a video game franchise originally developed by Naughty Dog for the PlayStation 2. Currently, six games in the series have been released, with Jak as the primary playable character in all except Daxter for the PlayStation Portable.

== Character development ==
Initial character design began in the year 2000, when Naughty Dog commissioned various artists to "scribble characters" for their next PlayStation 2 title. After several revisions, from wolf-like characters to various human concepts, Naughty Dog animator John Kim drew a concept of a "tall, slender, and agile" character that "sported jaunty, spiky hair," with an "exaggeration, weight, and thickness" that Kim described as "BAM!"; an internal mantra that served to describe the characteristics of the new personalities in the title. Bob Rafei proceeded with this concept and designed various concept art poses that would eventually depict a 15-year-old boy with spiky green-blond hair, a blue tunic, athletic physical attributes and excellent vehicular skills. Jak's character was described to have a clear "racer" design, sporting goggles and other aviator's equipment throughout the series.

== Main characters ==
=== Jak ===
Jak
- Jak and Daxter character
- First appearance: Jak and Daxter: The Precursor Legacy (2001)
- Last appearance: PlayStation All-Stars Battle Royale (2012)
- Created by: Naughty Dog
- Designed by: Bob Rafei
- Voiced by: Mike Erwin (2003–2005; 2011); Josh Keaton (2009; 2012)

In The Precursor Legacy, Jak is a mute, headstrong, often troublemaking boy. His personality would take a dramatic turn in Jak II and he would also gain a voice actor. He grows angry, impatient and reckless due to his desire for revenge from Dark Eco experiments. However, he still has some good left in him. In Jak 3, he came to handle dark eco more effectively, and is also granted light eco as a gift, which acts as a counterbalance.

Jak was born in Haven City where he lived as a young child until he was taken from his father Damas by Count Veger, only to have him lost to the Underground movement, which was headed by a Young Samos and Torn; this led to the events in Jak II. Young Samos then took Jak back in time to Sandover Village in The Old World in the hope of protecting him. There, he raised and guarded him until the events of The Precursor Legacy took place. Soon after, Jak, his friend Daxter, Samos, and his daughter Keira activated the Rift Gate found at the end of The Precursor Legacy. They were sent through the warp gate, as many metal heads came swarming out, including a large figure. They arrive in Haven City and Jak is arrested and integrated into the dark warrior program, where he is experimented upon with Dark Eco for two years until he is freed by Daxter. Afterwards, they come across a young boy and Kor, who is later revealed to be the metal heads leader. Kor takes them to the Underground, where they meet a younger Samos. While doing jobs for the Underground, Jak learns that Haven City was built on the ruins of his old home Sandover Village. He later finds Keira and the older Samos, and discovers that Baron Praxis is working with the metal heads, in an attempt to keep them at bay. Jak finds Praxis as he is killed by Kor in his metal head form. Jak later finds Kor in the Metal Head Nest, where another Rift Gate is found, along with the young boy. Before being decapitated by Jak, Kor reveals that the young boy is Jak. Young Samos and the young boy then head through the rift gate back in time to Sandover Village, which leads to the events in The Precursor Legacy.

Jak has a special relationship with an energy called eco that allows him to harness certain abilities. In The Precursor Legacy, he absorbs different colors of eco that give him different powers, such as speed, strength, life, and ranged bursts of eco. In Jak II, he is experimented on with dark eco by Baron Praxis, giving him the ability to turn into a form called Dark Jak. Throughout the game, talking to a Precursor oracle allows him to gain certain abilities when in Dark Jak form: dark blasts and bombs, invincibility, and a giant form. In Jak 3, he gains a new set of dark powers including invisibility and a powerful strike. He is also blessed by the Precursors with a Light Jak form, which gives him abilities such as flight, slowing time, healing, and a shield. In The Lost Frontier, Jak gets new eco powers, such as the Rocket Jump, and the Construct Power, which allows him to create platforms to leap from. He is unable to use his Dark Jak and Light Jak forms in this game, however, due to unstable eco.

Jak, alongside Daxter, appears as a playable character in the PlayStation 3 and Vita title, PlayStation All-Stars Battle Royale. He and Daxter are also featured in PlayStation Move Heroes.

In an interview, Naughty Dog's creative director said, "Jak is the hero you want to be…Jak is the stellar guy who is going to make it happen, who is going to save the world."

Jak was listed 26th on the Guinness World Records Gamer's Edition's "top 50 characters of all time". IGN mentioned that they liked Jak's character better in Jak 3 than in Jak II, because in Jak II he was a "whiny, brooding emo figure". In a poll conducted by Game Informer, Jak was voted as the 28th best character of the decade. IGN also listed Daxter and him the fifth best duo in gaming.

The character was originally voiced by an uncredited actor in 2001's Jak and Daxter: The Precursor Legacy. Mike Erwin took over the role for Jak II (2003), Jak 3 (2004), Jak X: Combat Racing (2005), and PlayStation Move Heroes (2011). Josh Keaton voiced the character in Jak and Daxter: The Lost Frontier and PlayStation All-Stars Battle Royale.

=== Daxter ===
Daxter is Jak's sidekick and closest friend. He is turned into an ottsel (half otter, half weasel) during Jak and Daxter: The Precursor Legacy after falling into a pool of dark eco. Daxter's accident would lead the story's plot as he seeks help from Gol to turn him back to normal. Before Daxter's transformation, he was a coward who seemed to be the opposite to Jak's courageous and trouble-making personality. Daxter often tries to persuade women using vulgar or lousy pick-up lines, much to Jak's dismay. Although Daxter is most often a coward, he exaggerates his stories to make himself seem heroic. Daxter has alternatively shown courage, even rescuing Jak in his own game, Daxter, which directly precedes the events of Jak II. Daxter gets a love interest of his own in Jak II, Tess, a spy working for the Underground. It is revealed in Jak 3 that his transformation had been into a Precursor, a group of ancient ottsels. In The Lost Frontier, Daxter is further changed by dark eco and has a transformation known as Dark Daxter, similar to Dark Jak. While as Dark Daxter, Daxter grows above Jak's height, can shoot dark eco blasts, and can spin around like a tornado. His personality also changes while in this form as he has the desire to smash and break things. In all his appearances, Daxter is voiced by actor Max Casella.

== Supporting characters ==
=== Samos the Sage ===
Samos the Sage, most prominently featured in Jak and Daxter: The Precursor Legacy, serves as a guide throughout the series and is the father of Keira. He first appears in The Precursor Legacy as the Sage of green eco, as well as a rough fatherly figure to Jak and Daxter. He is deeply fascinated with the Precursors and has devoted his life to studying them. His appearance is often mocked by Daxter, most commonly the fact that he is green and that he wears a log in his hair. Samos can levitate, though he is only seen using it during The Precursor Legacy. In Jak II, it's revealed that Samos is from the future, along with Jak as Samos was responsible for taking him back into the past to protect him from the Metal Heads and became Jak's unofficial father. In Jak X, he was the only part of the crew that was not poisoned. He tried to forbid Keira from racing, but she eventually disobeys him, wanting to help save her friends. He is voiced by Warren Burton.

=== Keira ===
Keira is Samos' daughter and Jak's love interest. An expert mechanic, Keira is responsible for most of the technology Jak uses, including his jet board and other means of transportation. In Jak X, she maintains the team's vehicles while begging Samos to race. He denies her, but she eventually goes against his wishes and races in the final race series. In Jak and Daxter: The Lost Frontier, Keira aspires to become a sage, and travels with Jak and Daxter in a quest to save the world by finding out the source of the eco shortage. There's a running gag that at the end of every game (with the exception of Jak 3) Keira and Jak try to kiss, only to be loudly interrupted by Daxter. However, at the end of Jak X, the two finally share a kiss. She is voiced by Anna Garduño in the first two games and by Tara Strong in the rest of the series.

=== Torn ===
Torn is the Underground's second in command in Jak II and a Freedom League General in the war in Jak 3. In Jak II, Torn frequently sends Jak on missions to uncover information on the city, or more often than not, to carry out strikes on the Baron's forces. As an ex-Krimzon Guard of high authority he has witnessed the Baron's evil deeds. His hatred of Baron Praxis stems from a battle against the Metal Heads when they invaded the city. Rather than fight on and push the Metal Heads back, Praxis sealed off the section of the city leaving everyone outside the wall to die. After this Torn left the guard and joined the underground to fight back. Initially distrusting and disrespectful of Jak and Daxter, Torn does show signs of trust and respect after the Shadow/Samos decides to meet them. In Jak 3, Torn needs Jak's help many times and trusts him with vital missions in order to destabilize the new KG Death Bots and Cyber Erol. In Jak X, Torn is one of the characters who became poisoned and was forced with everyone else to race for the championship and the antidote. He is voiced by Cutter Garcia.

=== Ashelin ===
Ashelin was a member of the Krimzon Guard, who first appeared in Jak II, and daughter to Baron Praxis and Torn's love interest. Ashelin becomes a close friend to Jak after warming up to him and starting to trust him more. After Praxis died, Ashelin took position of Governor of Haven City and began a relationship with Torn. Later in Jak 3, she became the main love interest for Jak, where she continually struggles to give Jak support and aid after his banishment from Haven City to the Wasteland and eventual return. She later has a kiss with Jak at the end of Jak 3 off screen. Naughty Dog was originally going to put the two of them together, but several fans were not pleased with this and the creators put her back with Torn and Jak with Keira. In Jak X, she accompanied Jak to the reading of Krew's will which saw the group poisoned, bitter at the situation and more so at Rayn she was determined not to trust her life to anyone but herself, although she still kept her relationship with Torn. She is voiced by Susan Eisenberg.

=== The Precursors ===
The Precursors are an ancient race consisting of ottsels (half otter, half weasel), they are the central deities of the Jak universe. The Precursors assumed that if the people knew that their "gods" were merely fuzzy little rats, they would not be admired or venerated. Therefore, they created exaggerated myths in which they depicted themselves as humanoid beings made of Light Eco. The Precursors are worshiped by the Precursor Monks, who protect Precursor technology from the Metal Heads. They communicate with Jak through most of the games (except Jak X) and give him advice and various powers. They are voiced by David Herman and Richard McGonagle.

== Antagonists ==
=== Gol and Maia Acheron ===
Warped by their long exposure to dark eco prior to the events of The Precursor Legacy, Gol and Maia Acheron planned to break open the dark eco silos with a modified Precursor robot in order to flood the world with dark eco and reshape it to their own twisted vision. After being defeated by Jak, they fell into one of the many silos that contain dark eco. Samos the Sage claims that they were "probably" killed. They are voiced by Dee Snider and Jennifer Hagood, respectively.

=== Kor ===
Kor is seen at the beginning of Jak II with the kid as an elderly man working with the Underground, directing Jak and Daxter to Torn. He later appears giving help and missions to Jak. He is well-trusted by the members of the underground rebellion. However, he later betrays Jak, tries to kill Vin, and allows the Metal Heads into the city. He then goes to the construction site, reveals himself as the Metal Head Leader, and kills Baron Praxis and several members of the Krimzon Guard. Jak goes to the Metal Head nest, where Kor reveals secrets about Jak, his past, Mar, and the Precursors and tries to kill him, but is ultimately killed by Jak instead. His head would later be taken back to Daxter's new pub, the Naughty Ottsel, as a trophy. He is voiced by Sherman Howard.

=== Baron Praxis ===
Baron Praxis is the tyrannical and corrupt ruler ("Grand Protector") of Haven City who antagonizes Jak and Daxter during the events of Jak II. He is the father of Ashelin, and was directly responsible for Jak's acquisition of dark eco powers. Praxis is a strongly-built middle-aged man; half of his head is mechanically replaced due to injuries he sustained during an attack on the Metal Head Nest. He wears a royal Krimzon Guard uniform and has a glowing green eco sword which once belonged to Damas. He is a tyrannical ruler who cares little for the people other than his own gratitude and is willing to abandon his men should he be left no choice. He is killed by Kor after the latter tries to double-cross him. Jak's motive was to get revenge against what he did to him, but chooses to save the city from the Baron's rule. He is voiced by Clancy Brown.

=== Krew ===
Krew is a gang boss, black marketeer, and weapons enthusiast in Haven City in Jak II. Extremely obese, he achieves mobility with the aid of a hover chair. His customers include Brutter and Baron Praxis. He is killed during the course of Jak II at the weapons factory after fighting Jak. Despite his death, Krew continues to play an important role in the future events due to his connections in the underground world and to Jak's life. In Jak 3, Jak is banished to the Wasteland after it was believed his association with Krew helped the Metal Heads invade Haven City. In Jak X, it is revealed that Krew is obsessed with racing as much as weapons. He sets up a reading of his will before he dies and poisons the main characters' drinks, forcing them to race in and win the Kras City Grand Championship for the antidote. It is revealed that he has a daughter named Rayn who is almost just like her father and makes sure he gets his trophy. He is voiced by William Minkin.

=== Erol ===
Erol, alternatively spelled Errol, is one of the major villains of Daxter, Jak II, and Jak 3. During the events of Daxter and Jak II, he is the commander of the Krimzon Guard in Haven City, serving under Baron Praxis, and the Grand Champion of Haven City's racing circuit. He seems mostly to care for showing off at the races, pursuing Jak and lusting after Keira. He is seemingly killed after crashing into a pile of dark eco barrels after the championship race in a suicidal charge at Jak. In Jak 3, Erol returns, heavily reconstructed and speaking with a digital voice. Since his last appearance, he seems to have become bent on causing mindless destruction. He uses the technology in his body like a satellite to communicate with the Dark Makers, seeking their power. After being tracked down to the Dark Maker ship, he escapes from Jak and takes a dark machine (called a Terraformer), which is taken down by Jak's peacemaker, resulting in a massive explosion that kills him. He is voiced by David Herman.

=== Kaeden ===
Kaeden is a Metal Head who works for Kor and is the leader of the Metal Bugs. He appears in Daxter (and as a secret racer in Jak X). His job was to discourage Osmo into shutting down the Critter Ridder extermination company. After they have an argument about the establishment, Kaeden kills Tik (Daxter's little sidekick) and blows up the building. After Daxter finds Kaeden, he transforms into a huge metal bug and fights Daxter. Before he dies, he tells Daxter that Kor will be meeting him and Jak outside, that the Metal Heads are too powerful, and that the city will be theirs. He is voiced by Phil LaMarr.

=== Count Veger ===
Count Veger debuted in Jak 3. Due to his past history with Jak, he is considered to be a major villain in the series, even though he only appeared in one game. When there was a big Metal Head invasion, he blamed Jak and sent him to the Wasteland. Count Veger had hidden the fact that Jak is Mar for as long as he knew him. Veger had an obsession with Precursors and their light eco powers. His plans were to destroy the palace at Haven, travel down to the planetary defense system that housed the power of the precursors, and transform into one. Veger is dismayed at the fact they are ottsels. Having just wished to become a Precursor, he is transformed into one himself. He is voiced by Phil LaMarr.

=== G.T. Blitz / Mizo ===
Mizo, the main antagonist of Jak X, is a major crime lord in Kras City and a rival of the deceased Krew. His true identity is that of G.T. Blitz, the commentator of the Kras City Grand Championship, whose neglectful father was once the best racer on the planet until he was killed on the Dethdrome circuit in an "accident" arranged by his son. Throughout the game, Blitz reports the races on his own television show. In the final tournament, Mizo reveals himself and steals the poison antidote from the gang. After being hunted down by Jak, he is killed in a large explosion. He is voiced by Phil LaMarr.

=== Duke Skyheed ===
Duke Skyheed is the leader of the Aeropans, a group of people living near the edge of Jak's world. Despite his friendly appearance, the player may almost immediately realize or suspect that he is the villain of the game. Like Gol and Maia, he believes dark eco is a key to accelerating evolution, and has experimented on many creatures, twisting them using means similar to those of Baron Praxis' experiments on Jak. He is not afraid to make some "worthwhile casualties" to achieve his goal of making the Aeropans a new dominant species, and has already infected all of his people with dark eco, though not enough to cause more than a sickly pigmentation on their skin. Towards the end of the game, he absorbs so much dark eco he becomes like Jak's "Dark Jak" form, only much taller and with even more brute strength. He refers to Jak as "mainlander", at first as if an affectionate nickname, but later as a derogatory term. He is later killed after Jak avenges Phoenix's sacrifice. He is voiced by Phil LaMarr.

=== Enemies ===
- Lurkers – Lurkers are the main enemies of The Precursory Legacy. The most common species are Lurker soldiers. They were in service to Gol and Maia and sported metal collars to signify it. There is also a Lurker Shark whose presence prevents Jak from swimming out to sea. There are many species of Lurker, with the only common trait being tusks protruding from their lower jaw. In Jak II, they have been enslaved by the Krimzon Guard, and the few free ones live at the dig site. The Lurkers unite with Jak to help him fight the Metal Heads.
- The Metal Heads – The Metal Heads are an ancient race of violent creatures. They waged a massive war with the Precursors and won. After Jak, Daxter, Keira, and Samos opened the Rift Gate, they spread across the universe and destroyed most of the Precursor civilization. Haven City has been at war with the Metal Heads since before the time of the games chronologically. Mar constructed Haven City with a large energy shield for the purpose of protecting the people and precursor artifacts from the Metal Heads. It's later revealed that Baron Praxis made a deal with the Metal Heads: the Metal Heads get their eco so long as they make staged attacks to make it look like Praxis is winning' however, the eco supply and the Metal Head leader's patience is waning by the events of Jak II, and it is only a matter of time until the Metal Heads invade. Metal Heads have diverse physiology, ranging from forms similar to a colossal squid to massive Tyrannosaurs and Pterodactyl with mortars on their back. Their biology is mainly a combination of reptilian and insectoid characteristics. The Metal Heads are cyborgs equipped with numerous weapons and devices easily accommodated by their diverse physiology. All Metal Heads have a characteristic gem embedded in their skulls. These gems, referred to as 'Metal Head Skull Gems', are dropped whenever a player kills a Metal Head. These gems are a collectible item in Jak II and Jak 3. They are used to grant Jak new dark eco abilities and open challenges. The real name of the Metal Heads are the Hora-quan.
- The Krimzon Guard – Known as the KG, the Krimzon Guard were Haven City's military police leading up to and during Jak II. They used brutality to police the city and provoked random arrests and apprehensions. They arrested Jak when he arrived in Haven City from the past at the start of Jak II. During the events of Jak II, the Krimzon Guard reported to Baron Praxis, and his second in command, Erol. By the events of Jak 3, the Krimzon Guard were under Torn's control and had been reformed into The Freedom League. The Freedom League uses blue armor and technology. The group was then transformed into the 'KG Death Bots' faction during Jak 3. They consist entirely of droids, similar to the robots found in the weapons factory in Jak II, and are led by Cyber Erol. The original Krimzon Guard were voiced by Phil LaMarr and David Herman, while the Freedom League were voiced by Brian Bloom, Chris Cox, and Cutter Garcia.
- The Dark Makers – The Dark Makers are a group of Precursors that have been corrupted by dark eco. They appear only in Jak 3, where they send dark satellites down upon the planet. Later, their spaceship, known as the Day Star or the Dark Maker ship, begins approaching the planet. They make an alliance with the KG and Metal Heads and begin to attack Spargus City. Erol, the leader of the KG and Metal Heads, attempts to communicate with them. After Jak destroys their ship, Erol steals a huge Dark Maker Terraformer and attacks Jak. After he is defeated the Dark Makers leave. They may have a connection to the Metal Heads; Jak hints they may have tried making an alliance with them. Onin says that they have conquered many planets. Varieties include the Dark Troopers, Dark Fliers, Dark Spores, and Dark Flowers.
- Marauders – Marauders are a clan of violent people that live in the Wasteland. They consist of people so evil that Spargus itself has banished them. They drive around in dune buggies and attack Jak when he drives near them. On foot they wear masks and fight with swords. Captured Marauders fight in the Spargus arena. They have a small island base in the southern Wasteland, and a huge base in the Icelands. At one point during Jak 3 they attack Spargus using regular vehicles, flaming vehicles, and huge bombardment vehicles.
- Aeropans – The Aeropans, led by Duke Skyheed, are the main enemies in Jak and Daxter: The Lost Frontier. Their home town is Aeropa which is on the brink of the world. Skyheed infected the whole city with dark eco making the Aeropan soldiers use it as a weapon. They make regular attacks on the eco pirates using the ACS Behemoth III.
- Sky Pirates – In The Lost Frontier, Sky Pirates are Jak's enemies until he meets Phoenix. The Sky Pirates look for eco so they can sell it at the Eco Market. They also steal valuable items. Their ships are not fast but have fast firing rate. Most of them are not on Phoenix's ship, so Jak faces them in Barter's Bar.
- Tym's Robots – In The Lost Frontier, Tym built robots to take back what the Dark Project has done. On Brink Island, the robots betrayed him and attacked who ever comes on the island. Most of the robots have saws or lasers.
- Dark Eco Mutants – In The Lost Frontier, the dark eco mutants are subjects used to control dark so the Aeropans can see the side effects, releasing them if there are none.

== Other characters ==
- Brutter – Brutter was a Lurker and a trinket salesman in Haven City's bazaar area in Jak II. His connections with Krew allowed him to ask Jak to rescue Lurkers enslaved by Praxis. He is intelligent enough to speak, but his grammar is poor. He had been appointed Captain by Ashelin after Praxis is dethroned and killed, but has not made any more appearances in the series. He appears in the prequel game Daxter in which he worked at a large fishery before being connected with Krew's business. He is voiced by Alan Blumenfeld.
- Cutter, Shiv, and Edje – Cutter, Shiv, and Edje are three of Mizo's henchmen in Jak X, who race early in the series. They are first seen at the first race, and then frequently race against Jak's crew. Cutter is also known to wear a hockey mask over his face, while Shiv has tattoos on his face. Cutter remained silent, while Shiv and Edje had speaking roles in the opening cut-scene, where they talked with Daxter and constantly tried to kill him with poisoned beer (although Daxter only blabs about his heroics and never drinks up), before Razer arrives. As they prepare to kill him, Jak arrives and saves Daxter. They race early in the series, but are then replaced by better drivers. However, they continue to serve Mizo. It is unknown what happened to them after Mizo's death.
- Damas – Damas, first appearing in Jak 3, was the king of Haven City before Baron Praxis took overthrew him and took the throne. He later founded and became king of Spargus City, a place of refuge for those banished from Haven City, but at a price: only the strong can stay. He forces Jak to do jobs for him to prove his worth as a Wastelander and as a citizen of Spargus, all the while growing to respect Jak and even viewing him as a son. He later arrives as Jak is trying to find the Catacombs, but their vehicle is overturned, and Damas is mortally wounded. When Damas was dying, he revealed he was Mar's father, causing Jak to realize he is Damas' son; Damas dies in Jak's arms before Jak can tell him. He is voiced by Bumper Robinson.
- Blue, Red, and Yellow Sages – The Blue, Red, and Yellow Sages, like Samos the Green Sage, are masters of blue, red, and yellow eco, respectively. They are kidnapped by Gol and Maia, but are later freed by Jak and Daxter. They combine their powers with Samos' to create light eco, which Jak uses to defeat Gol and Maia. They are voiced by John Di Crosta, Sherman Howard, and Jason Harris, respectively.
- Jinx – Jinx was a former member of the Underground and one of Krew's former henchmen who Jak helped escort through the sewers in Jak II. In Jak 3, he helped Torn and the Freedom League fight the Metal Heads and the KG, and he and Jak were assigned to destroy several Metal Head eggs. He has not made any appearances since then. He is voiced by Cutter Garcia.
- Kleiver – Kleiver is a tough, obese, and scarred leader of the Wasteland mercenaries. He disrespects Jak, and often challenges him to prove his skills as a driver, usually awarded with a new car if he wins. He also has morbid jokes and often quotes that he will eat Daxter sometime. In the beginning of Jak 3, Kleiver openly states that he dislikes and distrusts Jak and Daxter, but he eventually grows to like and trust the pair more, as they continue to prove themselves loyal to the cause over time. Kleiver was the one who found Jak in the Wasteland after he passed out in the desert due to exhaustion, and brought him to Spargus City to Damas himself. He also appears in Jak X, arriving in Kras City from the Wasteland after hearing about the championship and that Jak participates, and then joins Mizo's team to challenge Jak again. He is voiced by Brian Bloom.
- Osmo – Osmo is the elderly manager of the Critter Ridder Extermination Company in Daxter, and has the appearance of an old man with a white beard. He is the only exterminator who has not been driven out of business by Kaeden. He also has a son who helps Daxter later in the game. At the beginning of the game Daxter escape a Krimzon Guard while Osmo watches intrigued, and later hires Daxter to help him. He is voiced by Dana Kelly.
- Pecker – Pecker is a Spanish-accented moncaw (half monkey, half macaw) who served as an interpreter for Onin. He has little regard for Onin's words, often twisting them to his preference and summarizing them in a disrespectful manner. He and Daxter have a bitter rivalry from the moment they meet, often fighting and yelling obscenities at each another. In Jak II, he is simply Onin's interpreter, but in Jak 3, he joins Jak and Daxter out in the Wasteland and briefly becomes Damas' advisor before returning to Onin. In Jak X: Combat Racing, Pecker becomes the co-host on the Kras City Racing Championship with G.T. Blitz, who is annoyed by Pecker's loud-mouthed attitude. He is voiced by Chris Cox.
- Phoenix – Phoenix is captain of the sky pirates in Jak and Daxter: The Lost Frontier. In the intro, Phoenix went with his normal routine but got distracted by Keira's beauty and the fact Jak has eco powers. Later in the game, he sends the crew to attack the ACS Behemoth. After Jak saves the Behemoth, he gets invited to Aeropa, where Phoenix takes the eco seeker and kidnaps Keira. When Jak boards the Phantom Blade (Phoenix's pirate ship) Phoenix and Keira are friends but still Jak dislikes Phoenix and vice versa. At the end of the game Phoenix sacrifices himself and the Phantom Blade to stop Skyheed absorbing dark eco so Jak can destroy the Behemoth. He was apparently "showing Jak up" as he said. He is voiced by Robin Atkin Downes.
- Rayn – Rayn is a main character in Jak X: Combat Racing and is the daughter of Krew. Rayn is introduced as a very polite, kind, very attractive and well brought up individual (completely different from her rude, morbidly obese and ugly evil father). She was presumed poisoned along with everyone else at her father's will reading, however due to a planned scheme she was the only one free of any poison (known as Black Shade: A rare and deadly plant found in the Wasteland) Upon winning the championship she left the group at the bar and possible purposely left her father's journal which revealed the plan laid out by Krew. Rayn was then the dominant crime lord of Kras City. However, she didn't let the others get killed having viewed them as friends, but may likely return as a villain. She is voiced by Jeannie Elias.
- Razer – Razer is the former Kras City Champion, and he raced on the tracks decades ago all over the planet, considered himself one of the best of the racers ever. However, he is actually evil in nature. After he retired from the racing world, he started to work for Mizo as one of his top drivers. After Jak refused to back off from the championship, he assembled a crew, considering of Krew's goons, Cutter, Shiv and Edje. After that, he hired many other drivers, including a Krimzon Guard robot named UR-86, then he hired Kleiver (who only wanted to eliminate Jak) and after no choice, he returned himself into the world of racing to eliminate Jak. It is unknown what happened to him after Mizo's death. He is voiced by David Herman.
- Seem – Seem is the leader of the monks of the Precursor Order. Her primary mission is to find and protect any artifacts of the Precursors. At first, she despises and distrusts Jak, and upon seeing his dark powers, she refers to him as "dark one." However, Seem comes to realize his heroic qualities, eventually trusting him with a very important Precursor artifact that Erol tried to steal from the temple. She is voiced by Tara Strong.
- Sig – Sig is a Wastelander who first appeared in Jak II and later becomes a good friend of Jak and Daxter. He was Krew's supposed right-hand man, occasionally helping Jak in his missions. His last mission for Krew was opening a door in the Underport; unfortunately, this was a trap set up by Krew and Metal Kor to infiltrate Haven City. Almost swarmed by Metal Heads, he was rescued by Jak but seemingly killed by a Metal Head, although it was revealed in the end he had survived. In Jak 3, he is known to be Spargus City's spy in Haven City, giving Damas valuable information on the whereabouts of his son Mar. Following Damas' death, he becomes the new king of Spargus. In Jak X, he joins in on the racing action in an attempt to help Jak and the others win the championship and gain the antidote for the poison from Krew's henchmen. He is voiced by Phil LaMarr.
- Tess – Tess appears very soon after the beginning of Jak II, talking to Torn when Jak and Daxter arrive at the Underground hideout. She becomes the love interest of Daxter due to her finding Daxter cute. Sent by Torn to spy on Krew, she works undercover as the barmaid of the Hip Hog Haven Saloon. In Jak 3, Tess reunites with Jak and Daxter in the Gun Course, where she designs and creates new guns to help out with the war effort. When Daxter is granted his pair of pants at the end of the game, Tess says that she wishes that she had a pair just like them; the Precursor Leader responds by turning her into an Ottsel. Her only appearance in Jak X is during a short film that can be bought from the Secrets Shop. She is voiced by Britton A. Hill.
- UR-86 is one of the racers recruited by Razer in Jak X. He is a Krimzon Guard droid who managed to develop his own sense and became a racer. Since he is a droid, he has perfect senses and incredible reaction in his driving, making him one of the toughest racers on the planet, although he doesn't have a speaking role. It is unknown what happened to him after Mizo's death.
- Vin – Vin is a paranoid scientist who first appears in Jak II as an informant for the underground, where Torn sends Jak and Daxter on a mission to rescue him. After they find him, Vin works on the city defense grid and asks for Jak's help several times. He is deeply afraid of the Metal Heads. During the final events of the game he is fatally wounded by Kor (who is revealed to be the leader of the Metal Heads); before dying he tells Jak that Kor is at the construction site. In Jak 3, he makes a brief appearance where he reveals that he survived his death by placing his brain in the control grid; this makes him happy due to believing that the Metal Heads can't get him if he's in the grid (although he ponders if they actually can). He then allows Daxter to download himself into the computer to retrieve the access code to the War Factory. He is voiced by Robert Patrick Benedict.
- Osmo - He is an old man who owned an extermination business called Kridder Ridder founded by his grandfather Ozmar Itchy Drawers III, until it got destroyed by Kaeden during the events of Daxter.
- Taryn - A woman Daxter first met at the construction site and gave him a Sprayer and upgrades for it throughout the game.
- Ximon - Ximon is Osmo's son and has helped Daxter on certain missions and sneak into Baron Praxis’s palace and fortress to rescue Jak.

== Reception ==
The main characters of the Jak and Daxter series have had a varied reception. Jak was listed 26th on the Guinness World Records Gamer's Edition 's "Top 50 Characters of All Time", and in a poll conducted by Game Informer, Jak was voted 28 in the top 30 video game characters of the decade. He and Daxter were listed in the top 25 best duo in gaming, coming in fifth place by IGN. However, IGN also noted that they liked Jak better in Jak 3 than in Jak II due to his apparent transition to a more mature personality." Opinion from critics and players are divided on Daxter; some found him funny, while others consider him to be annoying.
