= Cutter Garcia =

American actor

- Other name: Cutter Mitchell
- Education: University of Massachusetts Amherst
- Occupation: Actor
- Years active: 1997–present

Cutter Garcia is an American actor. He is the voice of Torn in the Jak and Daxter video game series.

== Career ==
Garcia has made appearances in television series such as Monk, Weeds, Pretty Little Liars, Agents of S.H.I.E.L.D., and Mom. He voiced Torn in the Jak and Daxter video game series and has done voice work in the video games Ratchet & Clank Future: A Crack in Time, L.A. Noire and Benno's Great Race Interactive Ride. He was also the co-host of NIGHTSHIFT from 1992 to 1993 and the writer and producer of Yummie Creative from 2000 to 2013.

== Education ==
Garcia attended the University of Massachusetts Amherst from 1989 to 1994 and received his bachelor's degree in journalism.

== Filmography ==
=== Film ===
Year	Title	Role	Notes
2009	Redline	Todoroki (voice)	English dub
2012	Last Call	Joe	

=== Television ===
Year	Title	Role	Notes
2001	Max Steel	Durham (voice)	Episode: "Extreme"
2001	Figure 17: Tsubasa & Hikaru	Kenta Hagiwara (voice)	English dub
2002	Dog Eat Dog	Himself	Contestant; won $5,000
2003	The Mullets	Kronander	Episode: "Smoke on the Water"
2003	Grounded for Life	Robber # 2	Episode: "Been Caught Stealing"
2003–2007	Las Vegas	Iggy Myers/Lenny	3 episodes
2004	Rocket Power	Skunk (voice)	Episode: "Twist of Fate"
2004	As Told by Ginger	Mr. Minor (voice)	Episode: "Butterflies Are Free"
2006	Monk	Uniform Cop	Episode: "Mr. Monk and the Class Reunion"
2006–2010	Hannah Montana	Paulie the Paparazzo	3 episodes
2007	CSI: Miami	Drew Benson	Episode: "Just Murdered"
2007	The 1/2 Hour News Hour	The Creep	1 episode
2007–2008	Gurren Lagann	Kid Coega, Prisoner, Citizen (voices)	English dub
2008	Chuck	Hostile Customer	Episode: "Chuck Versus the Undercover Lover"
2008	Knight Rider	Scorpio	Episode: "Knight of the Zodiac"
2008	Childrens Hospital	Dr. Antonio Zarala	Episode: "Nut Cutters?"
2009	Raising the Bar	Farnsworth's Clerk	2 episodes
2012	Betty White's Off Their Rockers	Paparazzi	1 episode
2012	Weeds	Homeless Pete	2 episodes
2014	Pretty Little Liars	Zoo Worker	Episode: "Free Fall"
2014	Suburgatory	Gary	Episode: "Dalia Nicole Smith"
2014	Masters of Sex	Errol	Episode: "Giants"
2014	Agents of S.H.I.E.L.D.	Bartender	Episode: "Heavy Is the Head"
2016	Mom	Wayne	Episode: "Sticky Hands and a Walk on the Wild Side"
2018	Alexa & Katie	Delivery Man, Pizza Guy	2 episodes

=== Video games ===
Year	Title	Role
2003	Jak II	Torn, Jinx
2004	Jak 3	Torn, Jinx, Wastelander #1, Freedom League Guards
2005	Jak X: Combat Racing	Torn
2009	Ratchet & Clank Future: A Crack in Time	Vullard #2
2011	L.A. Noire	Mervin the Bookmaker
2016	Benno's Great Race Interactive Ride	Awesome Possum, Squirrel #1

=== Other ===
Year	Title	Role	Notes
1997	Pink as the Day She Was Born	Porn Director	
1998	Sometimes Santa's Gotta Get Whacked	Lil' Petey	Short film
1998	Blunt	Joe	
2004	Recycling Flo	Vet Assistant	Short film
2005	Guy in Row Five	Tony	
2009	Not Evelyn Cho	Louis	Short film
2011	Don't Feed the Animals	Steve Gunther	
2011	Pullover	Mr. H	Short film
