= Susan Eisenberg =

American actress

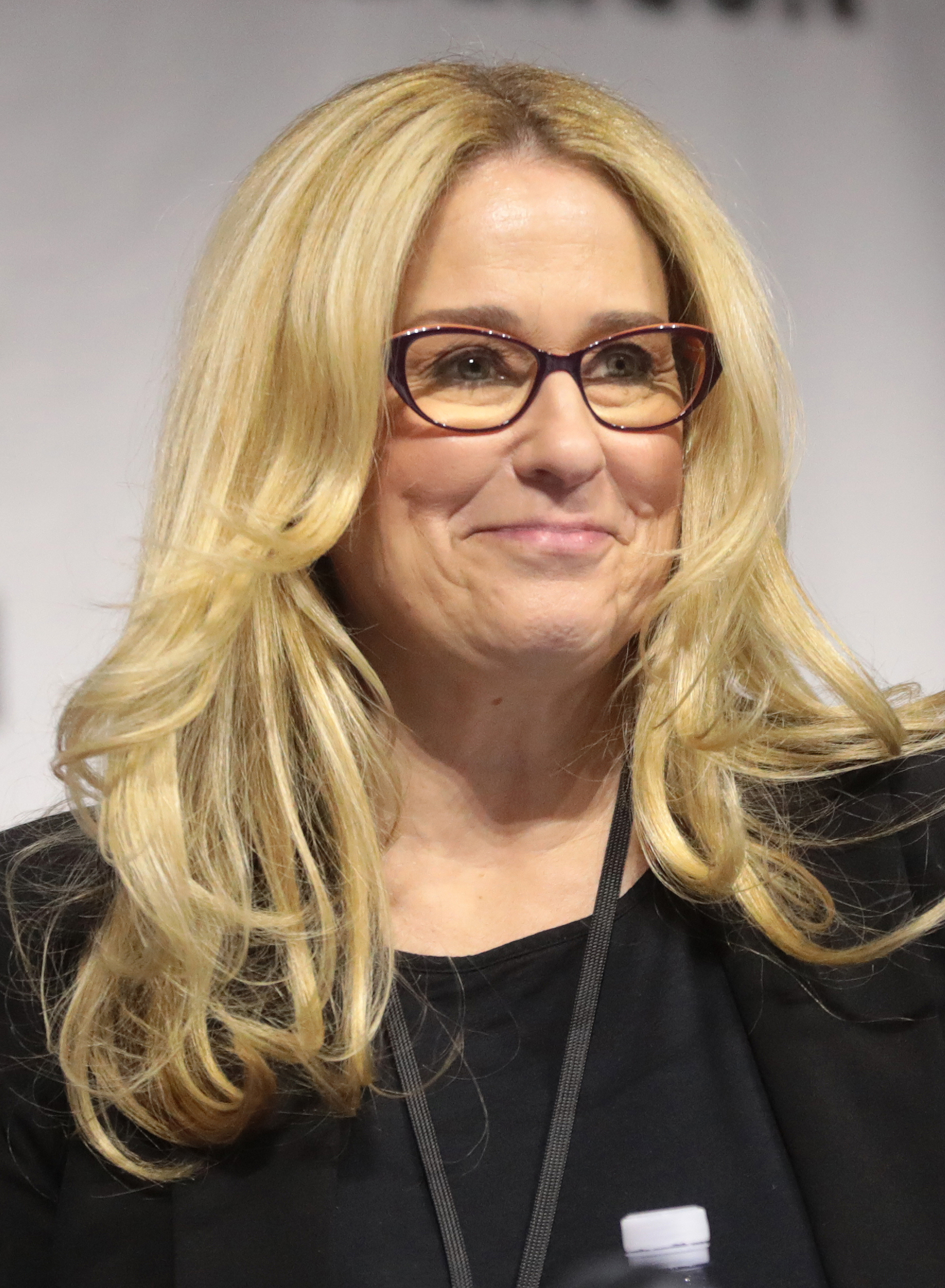
- Eisenberg at the 2019 WonderCon
- Occupation: Actress
- Years active: 1990–present

Susan Eisenberg is an American voice actress. She is best known as the voice of Wonder Woman in the animated shows Justice League and Justice League Unlimited, a role she later reprised in several animated films and video games.

== Life ==
Her early work included the role of Viper on Jackie Chan Adventures. Her breakout role was that of Wonder Woman in the television series Justice League, which she reprised in Justice League Unlimited, as well as the direct-to-DVD films Superman/Batman: Apocalypse, Justice League: Doom and Justice League vs. the Fatal Five. She also voiced Wonder Woman in the video game Injustice: Gods Among Us and its sequel Injustice 2.

She continued her voice work in video games such as Star Wars: The Force Unleashed (Shaak Ti), Jak II (Ashelin), Daxter (Taryn), Mass Effect 3 (Councilor Irissa), The Elder Scrolls V: Skyrim, Mortal Kombat 1

== Education ==
Eisenberg studied acting and voice at American University (Washington, D.C.), AADA (New York City) and UCLA.

== Filmography ==
=== Voice over roles ===
==== Film ====
Year	Title	Role	Notes	Source(s)
2010	Superman/Batman: Apocalypse	Diana Prince / Wonder Woman	Direct-to-video	
2012	Justice League: Doom	Diana Prince / Wonder Woman	Direct-to-video	
2018	Lego DC Comics Super Heroes: Aquaman – Rage of Atlantis	Mera	Direct-to-video	
2019	Justice League vs. the Fatal Five	Diana Prince / Wonder Woman	Direct-to-video	

==== Television ====
Year	Title	Role	Notes	Source(s)
1996	Life with Louie	Camp Secretary	Episode: "Summer of My Discontent"	
1997	Extreme Ghostbusters	Additional voices	Episode: "In Your Dreams"	
2000	Godzilla: The Series	Dr. Candice Kirk	Episode: "Area 51"	
2000–2005	Jackie Chan Adventures	Viper	10 episodes	
2001–2004	Justice League	Diana Prince / Wonder Woman	35 episodes	
2004–2006	Justice League Unlimited	Diana Prince / Wonder Woman, Rampage	17 episodes	
2006	Avatar: The Last Airbender	Sela	Episode: "Zuko Alone"	
2010	The Super Hero Squad Show	Power Princess	Episode: "Whom Continuity Would Destroy!"	
2013	Wonder Woman	Diana Prince / Wonder Woman	3 episodes	
2021–2024	Masters of the Universe	Sorceress		

==== Video games ====
Year	Title	Role	Notes	Source(s)
2003	Brute Force	Hawk		
2003	Jak II	Ashelin, Computer Voice		
2004	Jak 3	Ashelin		
2005	Jak X: Combat Racing	Taryn, Ashelin		
2006	Daxter	Taryn, Barmaid		
2007	Ratchet & Clank Future: Tools of Destruction	Tachyon Robot		
2007	Golden Axe: Beast Rider			
2008	Star Wars: The Force Unleashed	Shaak Ti		
2008	Fracture	Voice Talent		
2008	Aion			
2011	The Elder Scrolls V: Skyrim	Female Vampires, Additional Voices		
2012	Mass Effect 3	Councilor Irissa, Jona Sederis		
2013	Injustice: Gods Among Us	Diana Prince / Wonder Woman		
2013	DC Universe Online	Diana Prince / Wonder Woman	^{a}	
2014	Destiny	Guardian: Human Female		
2014	Skylanders: Trap Team	Gearshift		
2015	Skylanders: SuperChargers	Gearshift		
2017	Injustice 2	Diana Prince / Wonder Woman		
2018	Lego DC Super-Villains	Diana Prince / Wonder Woman		
2023	Mortal Kombat 1	Ashrah		

^a: Replacement for Gina Torres who voiced her until DLC 8 Sons of Trigon.

==== Theme parks ====
Year	Title	Role	Notes	Source(s)
2015	Justice League: Battle for Metropolis	Diana Prince / Wonder Woman	Interactive dark ride at Six Flags	

=== Live action roles ===
==== Film ====
Year	Title	Role	Notes	Source(s)
1990	Voices Within: The Lives of Truddi Chase	Stewardess	Television film	
2016	The Chair	Ms. Prince		

==== Television ====
Year	Title	Role	Notes	Source(s)
1993	Class of '96	Disc Jockey	Episode: "The Jessica File"	
2015–2019	Suspense	Various characters	16 episodes	

Preceded by B.J. Ward (1988)	Voice of Wonder Woman; 2001–2006; 2008–Present	Succeeded by Lucy Lawless (2008)
