= Jak 2 =

Jak 2 may refer to:

- Jak II, a 2003 video game
- JAK2, or Janus kinase 2, an enzyme
