= Heavy Is the Head (Agents of S.H.I.E.L.D.) =

- Agents of S.H.I.E.L.D. episode
- Episode no.: Season 2 Episode 2
- Directed by: Jesse Bochco
- Written by: Paul Zbyszewski
- Cinematography by: Feliks Parnell
- Editing by: David Crabtree
- Original air date: September 30, 2014
- Running time: 43 minutes

Guest appearances
- Kyle MacLachlan as "The Doctor"; B. J. Britt as Antoine Triplett; Ruth Negga as Raina; Henry Simmons as Alphonso "Mack" Mackenzie; Adrian Pasdar as Glenn Talbot; Simon Kassianides as Sunil Bakshi; Brian Patrick Wade as Carl "Crusher" Creel

Episode chronology
| ← Previous "Shadows" | Next → "Making Friends and Influencing People" |
- Agents of S.H.I.E.L.D. season 2

"Heavy Is the Head" is the second episode of the second season of the American television series Agents of S.H.I.E.L.D. Based on the Marvel Comics organization S.H.I.E.L.D., it follows Phil Coulson and his team of S.H.I.E.L.D. agents as they fight Hydra and the U.S. military for a powerful artifact. It is set in the Marvel Cinematic Universe (MCU) and acknowledges the franchise's films. The episode was written by Paul Zbyszewski, and directed by Jesse Bochco.

Clark Gregg reprises his role as Coulson from the film series, and is joined by principal cast members Ming-Na Wen, Brett Dalton, Chloe Bennet, Iain De Caestecker, Elizabeth Henstridge, and Nick Blood.

"Heavy Is the Head" originally aired on ABC on September 30, 2014, and according to Nielsen Media Research, was watched by 5.05 million viewers. The episode received a mostly positive critical response, with much of the praise going to the development of both old and new characters, and to the brief appearance of guest star Kyle MacLachlan.

== Plot ==
Following the events of "Shadows", mercenary Lance Hunter is captured by Brigadier General Glenn Talbot, who offers him $2 million and a proper burial for late S.H.I.E.L.D. agent Isabelle Hartley, in exchange for selling out Director Phil Coulson. Agent Melinda May meanwhile follows Carl Creel, who can absorb the properties of anything he touches, and has absorbed the abilities of the mysterious Obelisk, which causes him to accidentally kill a waitress. After losing May, Creel is confronted by former Hydra associate Raina, who tries to bargain for the Obelisk. When this is unsuccessful, she contacts Coulson, and gives him the location of a meeting between Creel and his Hydra superior.

Hunter returns to the team and reveals his deal with Talbot, but explains that he wishes to work with them to take down Creel, who killed Hartley. Realizing that Coulson would rather take Creel prisoner than kill him, Hunter turns on Agents May, Skye, and Antoine Triplett, and attempts to assassinate Creel. A fight breaks out between Creel and Hunter, ended when Coulson uses a refined version of the Overkill Device, created by Agent Leo Fitz and Alphonso "Mack" Mackenzie, to turn Creel to stone. During the fight, Raina steals the Obelisk from Hydra, and delivers it to Skye's father, "The Doctor". She discovers that she is able to hold it without dying, and "The Doctor" promises to reveal its secrets once Raina brings Skye to him.

At the Playground, S.H.I.E.L.D.'s headquarters, Coulson has another "episode", carving symbols also found on the Obelisk into the wall, with May documenting the process. After Hartley's funeral, Hunter agrees to join S.H.I.E.L.D. permanently, though Coulson asks him to follow through with Talbot's deal.

In an end tag, Coulson and Talbot meet, but Talbot refuses to negotiate. Despite this, Coulson remains open to working with the U.S. government and military, and reveals that S.H.I.E.L.D. now has both a quinjet and carrier plane with operational cloaking technology among their arsenal.

== Production ==
=== Development ===
In September 2014, Marvel announced that the second episode of the season would be titled "Heavy is the Head", to be written by Paul Zbyszewski, with Jesse Bochco directing.

=== Casting ===
In September 2014, Marvel revealed that main cast members Clark Gregg, Ming-Na Wen, Chloe Bennet, Iain De Caestecker, Elizabeth Henstridge, and Nick Blood would star as Phil Coulson, Melinda May, Skye, Leo Fitz, Jemma Simmons, and Lance Hunter, respectively. It was also revealed that the guest cast for the episode would include Kyle MacLachlan, B. J. Britt, Ruth Negga, Henry Simmons, Adrian Pasdar, Simon Kassianides, Brian Patrick Wade, Wilmer Calderon, Carolina Espiro, Cutter Garcia, and Danny Pierce. MacLachlan, Espiro, Garcia, and Pierce were introduced in the episode as "The Doctor", waitress, bartender, and soldier, respectively. They all received co-starring credit in the episode, except MacLachlan. Britt, Simmons, Pasdar, Negga, Kassianides, reprise their roles from previous episodes as S.H.I.E.L.D. Agents Antoine Triplett and Alphonso "Mack" Mackenzie, General Glenn Talbot, Raina, and Hydra member Sunil Bakshi, respectively. Main cast member Brett Dalton, who portrays Grant Ward in the series, does not appear and is not credited in this episode.

== Release ==
=== Broadcast ===
"Heavy Is the Head" was first aired in the United States on ABC on September 30, 2014. It was aired alongside the US broadcast in Canada on CTV.

=== Home media ===
The episode began streaming on Netflix on June 11, 2015, and was released along with the rest of the second season on September 18, 2015, on Blu-ray and DVD. The episode, along with the rest of the series, was removed from Netflix on February 28, 2022, and later became available on Disney+ on March 16, 2022.

== Reception ==
=== Ratings ===
In the United States the episode received a 1.8/5 percent share among adults between the ages of 18 and 49, meaning that it was seen by 1.8 percent of all households, and 5 percent of all of those watching television at the time of the broadcast. It was watched by 5.05 million viewers. The Canadian broadcast gained 2.33 million viewers, the third highest for that day, and the ninth highest for the week.

=== Critical response ===
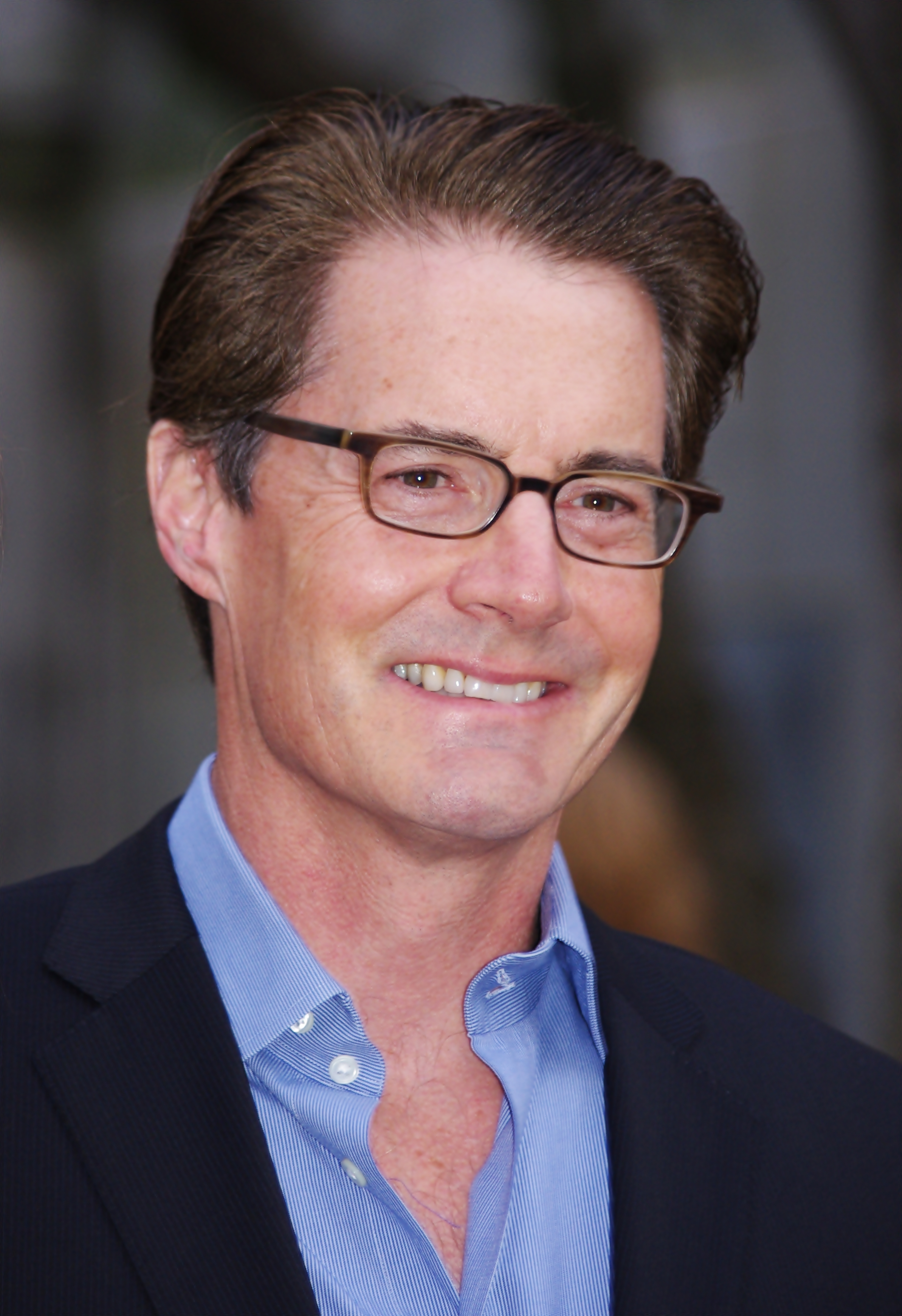
Kyle MacLachlan's appearance in the episode was greatly anticipated and, though brief, was received positively by critics.

James Hunt of Den of Geek thought that "the problem with this week's episode was that it was broadly the second part of last week's, rather than its own thing. As well as picking up seconds after that one finished, it also continued (and resolved) many of the plot threads it introduced, establishing the show's operating status quo in the final minutes. If it wasn't intended to be the back half of a feature-length episode, it does a very good impression of it." He called MacLachlan's appearance "The biggest moment of this episode", and felt that "it's tempting to say that his appearance was anticlimactic, but there's got to be more going on than we're shown, so I'm willing to reserve judgement." Eric Goldman of IGN scored the episode an 8.5 out of 10 and praised the development of the Hunter and Mack characters, feeling that "Hunter especially was given some good material, as we learned of his military-turned-mercenary background [and] we got to understand more about Mac being a mechanic ... asked to do a job he's not quite qualified for and who's confident enough to admit that." Goldman felt that the episode "continued to show off an improved series, boasting better pacing and a stronger overall tone", and praised the single-scene appearance of MacLachlan. Alan Sepinwall of HitFix stated that "The show hasn't reached peak capacity yet, but right now we're in the introductory phase in terms of story arcs and characters, and "Heavy Is the Head" did a fine job at that, particularly on the character end, while also offering up more cool Absorbing Man action." He praised the character development, especially the changes to those from the first season, but criticized the focus on non-character related story arcs, saying "The one lesson I had hoped the creative team had learned from last year is that character arcs are a lot more interesting when they're about who the characters are rather than what they are."

Oliver Sava of The A.V. Club graded the episode a "B−", but gave a negative review, specifying the episode's focus on Lance Hunter, who he called "a generic role that needs more personality and specificity in order to captivate." He did, however, praise the slow motion shot of Hunter shooting at Carl Creel, saying "That kind of directorial flair is what this show needs more of, and I would love to see this show's camera and design crews work together to create a more visually engaging experience. There needs to be more color and personality in the environments and costuming, and taking more chances with the camerawork will bring more excitement to the action and heighten the emotional beats of the script." Kevin Fitzpatrick of ScreenCrush stated that "we're thrilled to see "Heavy is the Head" taking the ball from last week and running with a very confident start to the season thus far." He particularly praised the characters of Hunter and Creel, and noted that while MacLachlan's appearance "didn't particularly deepen our understanding of the mystery to have the obelisk "spare" Raina its death touch, nor necessarily to have Coulson scratch out another board's worth of equations, it's nice to see the writers keeping the alien aspects in play as often as possible." Joseph McCabe, writing for Nerdist, felt that "So far this season, the show has kept what worked best in its first year, that Whedon-patented propensity for pairing end-of-the-world melodrama with the most mundane of concerns ... The line that lingers, however, is one uttered in last week's season premiere. Coulson again instructs his people to "Go dark." Just how dark is the question this season of S.H.I.E.L.D. poses. I'm happy to give the show as much time as it needs to answer it."
