= Wilmer Calderon =

Puerto Rican actor

- Born: May 8, 1975 (age 49); Santurce, San Juan, Puerto Rico
- Education: Marshall University
- Occupation: Actor
- Years active: 1994–present

Wilmer Calderon (born May 8, 1975) is a Puerto Rican actor of film and television. He is best known for his role as Diego in the Amazon Prime television series Borderline, Detective Daniel Arias in the police drama series Bosch and as Ricky in the FX drama series The Shield.

== Early life ==
Although Wilmer was born in Santurce, San Juan, Puerto Rico he left his native island at just 2 years old to travel with his parents to Brandon, Florida. His parents taught him Spanish at home, while at the same time, he learned English by watching episodes of Sesame Street.

At the age of 5 he started playing on a baseball team, with which he toured Florida playing the league in his category for a year. When he reached the senior level, he set the season record on stolen bases. He continued studies at Marshall University, where he began to realize his fondness for acting.

== Career ==
Wilmer debuted in 1995 with the crime drama film Dead Man Walking, playing the role of Angelo. He moved to television in 1996, appearing in The Mystery Files of Shelby Woo as Kevin Crossland in a two-part episode called "Hot Seats: Part 1 and Part 2".

He appeared as Ricky in the FX drama television series The Shield and he appeared in television shows such as The Bold and the Beautiful, ER, Pacific Blue and NYPD Blue.

Calderon appeared as Estrada in the 2006 drama film Annapolis, featuring James Franco and Tyrese Gibson.

For several years, he only worked on television, with the exception of the 2002 short Hold On. As early as 2005, and turning 10 years since his acting debut, he returns to the cinema with Venice Underground.

He played the role of Tash in Fast & Furious in 2009, featuring Vin Diesel and Paul Walker, and additionally, he played small roles in television series such as Castle, Grey's Anatomy and The Mentalist.

In 2017, he appeared as Boon in the episode "Resurgence" of the drama series The Night Shift.

== Filmography ==
=== Film ===
| Year | Title | Role | Notes |
|---|---|---|---|
| 1995 | Dead Man Walking | Angelo | |
| 2002 | Hold On | Latin #2 | Short film |
| 2005 | Venice Underground | Driver | |
| 2005 | Cursed | Police Officer #3 | |
| 2005 | Devil's Highway | Manuel | |
| 2006 | Annapolis | Estrada | |
| 2006 | Unknown | Detective Molina | |
| 2007 | Finishing the Game | Cesar | Deleted scenes |
| 2007 | La revolución de Iguodala | Iguodala | Short film |
| 2007 | Good Time Max | T-Ray | |
| 2008 | No Man's Land: The Rise of Reeker | Bleeding Man / Carlos | |
| 2009 | Fast & Furious | Tash | |
| 2011 | Sold | Will | Short film |
| 2011 | Happy New Year | Santiago | |
| 2011 | Beautiful Wave | Captain Quintero | |
| 2012 | Jewtopia | Juan | |
| 2015 | Desecrated | Eduardo | |
| 2015 | The Diabolical | Miguel | |
| 2015 | The Heyday of the Insensitive Bastards | Barnett | |
| 2015 | The Perfect Guy | Detective Gardner | |
| 2017 | Clinical | Greg | |
| 2018 | The Con Is On | Vlad | |
| 2018 | Future World | Skinny | |
| 2018 | Tinker | Manna | |
| 2020 | The Long Home | Arthur | |
| 2020 | Kill the Czar | Kenny the Driver | |
| 2022 | The Valet | Hugo (Pool Guy) | |

=== Television ===
| Year | Title | Role | Notes |
|---|---|---|---|
| 1996 | The Mystery Files of Shelby Woo | Kevin Crossland | Episodes: "Hot Seats: Parts 1 & 2" |
| 1996–1997 | Second Noah | Alex / Derrick / The Housefly Band Member | 6 episodes |
| 1996 | Summer of Fear | Delivery Man | Television movie |
| 1997 | Love's Deadly Triangle: The Texas Cadet Murder | Perry | Television movie |
| 1998 | The Bold and the Beautiful | Gang Member | Episode: "1.2799"; Credited as Wil Calderon |
| 1999 | Pacific Blue | Emilio Correro | Episode: "Juvies"; Credited as Wil Calderon |
| 1999 | Profiler | Victor | Episode: "Las Brisas" |
| 1999 | V.I.P. | Hector | Credited as Wil Calderon; Episode: "The Quick and the Dead" |
| 2000 | Seven Days | Morales | Episode: "Peacekeepers"; Credited as Wil Calderon |
| 2001 | ER | Mickey Stubbs | Credited as Wil Calderon; Episode: "Never Say Never" |
| 2003 | NYPD Blue | Ignacio Delgado | Episode: "Bottoms Up" |
| 2003 | Dragnet | Mike Beckway | Episode: "Coyote" |
| 2003 | Eve | Cameraman | Episode: "Player Down" |
| 2003 | 24 | Pedro | 2 episodes |
| 2004 | CSI: Miami | Jimmy Azario | Episode: "The Oath" |
| 2004 | The Shield | Ricky | 4 episodes |
| 2004 | Veronica Mars | Chardo Navarro | Episode: "Credit Where Credit's Due" |
| 2005 | The Dead Zone | Miguel | Episode: "Grains of Sand" |
| 2007 | Dexter | Teo | Episode: "Left Turn Ahead" |
| 2008 | The Closer | Luis Delgado | Episode: "Dial M for Provenza" |
| 2008 | Cold Case | Luther Carp '08 | Episode: "Street Money" |
| 2009 | Dark Blue | Ernesto | Episodes: "Betsy" and "A Shot in the Dark" |
| 2010 | Better Off Ted | Carlos | Episode: "The Great Repression" |
| 2010 | 10,000 Days | Xavier Ruiz | Episode: "Survivors" |
| 2011 | Castle | Marvin "Oz" Osminkowski | Episode: "Lucky Stiff" |
| 2011 | Grey's Anatomy | Raul Aranda | Episode: "I Will Survive" |
| 2011 | The Mentalist | Lalo Concepción | Episode: "Pink Tops" |
| 2013 | Monday Mornings | Mike Garrett | Episode: "One Fine Day" |
| 2013 | Bones | Milo Mills | Episode: "The Doom in the Gloom" |
| 2013 | Melissa & Joey | Andrew | Episode: "Bad Influence" |
| 2013 | Devious Maids | Shiv / Danny Hernandez | Episodes: "Pilot" and "Scrambling the Eggs" |
| 2013 | NCIS: Los Angeles | Marcos | Episode: "Recovery" |
| 2014 | Futurestates | Xavier | Episode: "Excarcerated" |
| 2014 | Agents of S.H.I.E.L.D. | Idaho | Episodes: "Shadows" and "Heavy Is the Head" |
| 2015–present | Borderline | Diego | Main cast |
| 2015–2017 | Making a Scene with James Franco | Various roles | 16 episodes |
| 2016 | NCIS | Wayne Cribbage a.k.a. Tiger Dad | Episode: "Love Boat" |
| 2017 | The Night Shift | Boon | Episode: "Resurgence" |
| 2017 | Real Rob | Andreas Cruz | Episode: "Now Boarding" |
| 2017 | The Haunted | Nathan Bradley | Television movie |
| 2018 | Lethal Weapon | Coach Latimer | Episode: "Jesse's Girl" |
| 2018 | The Incredible Life of Darrell | Frank Sanchez | Episode: "Thug Life" |
| 2019 | SEAL Team | Eric Hicks | Episode: "Rock Bottom" |
| 2019–2020 | Bosch | Detective Daniel Arias | 5 episodes |
| 2019 | Nice Iranian Girl | Chad | Episode: "Chapter 3" |
| 2020 | Stargirl | Juan Montez | Episode: "Wildcat" |
| 2021 | Lucifer | Officer Luis Navarro | Episode: "Daniel Espinoza: Naked & Afraid" |
| 2021 | Magnum, P.I. | Oscar Espinoza | Episode: "Devil on the Doorstep" |
| 2022 | The Rookie | Ralph Stevens | Episode: "Take Back" |
| 2024 | Griselda | Johnny | Television miniseries Episode: "Lady Comes to Town" |

=== Video games ===
| Year | Title | Role | Notes |
|---|---|---|---|
| 1994 | Astronomica: The Quest for the Edge of the Universe | Miguel Santiago (voice) | |
