= Star Trek Generations: Beyond the Nexus =

1994 video game

- Developer: Absolute Entertainment
- Publisher: Absolute Entertainment
- Producer: Dan Kitchen
- Designers: Gregory A. Faccone; Mark Beardsley; Michael Fernie; Bob Rafei
- Programmers: Michael Fernie; Mark Beardsley; Roger Amidon
- Artists: Gregory A. Faccone; Bob Rafei
- Composers: Mark Van Hecke; Jim Wallace
- Series: Star Trek
- Platforms: Game Boy, Game Gear
- Release: 1994
- Genres: Action, strategy
- Mode: Single-player

Star Trek Generations: Beyond the Nexus is a Star Trek video game released for the Nintendo Game Boy and Game Gear in 1994. It was developed and released by Absolute Entertainment, who back in 1993 released "Star Trek: The Next Generation - The Advanced Holodeck Tutorial". The space combat was adapted for the new game and further gameplay modes were added. The new game was developed for the film Star Trek Generations.

== Plot ==
The game loosely followed the plot of the then-recently released Star Trek Generations motion picture. Notable departures included an additional battle against Tholian forces, a Romulan ambush involving both space and ground combat at Amargosa Station, and a different resolution to the capture of Geordi La Forge.

== Gameplay ==
The game combines three different styles of play with minor differences from level to level. Spaceflight is done in a primitive pseudo-3D environment. Players steer their ship from a first-person point of view, moving between markers or using phasers and later photon torpedoes to attack enemy vessels. On-foot levels are played from a top-down perspective and involve either phaser combat or labyrinth-like pathfinding. The remaining levels consist of simple puzzles such as symbol matching.

== Differences between platforms ==
The Game Boy and Game Gear versions of the game are identical, save for their colour palette: while the GB version is limited to monochrome graphics (or a limited palette when played through a Super Game Boy adapter), the Game Gear version features full colour visuals.

== Reception ==
GamePro panned the Game Boy version, saying that the mediocre controls make the opening combat sequence so frustratingly difficult that most players will give up before seeing the bulk of the game. They also criticized the graphics.
