= Shadows (Agents of S.H.I.E.L.D.) =

- Agents of S.H.I.E.L.D. episode
- The Agent Carter tie-in sequence, featuring actors (L-R) Kenneth Choi, Hayley Atwell, and Neal McDonough, was a major talking point both before and after the episode aired.
- Episode no.: Season 2 Episode 1
- Directed by: Vincent Misiano
- Written by: Jed Whedon; Maurissa Tancharoen
- Cinematography by: Feliks Parnell
- Editing by: Joshua Charson
- Original air date: September 23, 2014
- Running time: 43 minutes

Guest appearances
- Hayley Atwell as Peggy Carter; B. J. Britt as Antoine Triplett; Neal McDonough as Timothy "Dum Dum" Dugan; Reed Diamond as Reinhardt / Daniel Whitehall; Henry Simmons as Alphonso "Mack" Mackenzie; Patton Oswalt as Billy Koenig; Lucy Lawless as Isabelle Hartley; Adrian Pasdar as Glenn Talbot; Wilmer Calderon as Idaho; Kenneth Choi as Jim Morita; Simon Kassianides as Sunil Bakshi; Brian Patrick Wade as Carl "Crusher" Creel; Matthew Glave as Roger Browning; George Stephanopoulos as himself

Episode chronology
← Previous "Beginning of the End"	Next → "Heavy Is the Head"
- Agents of S.H.I.E.L.D. season 2

"Shadows" is the first episode of the second season of the American television series Agents of S.H.I.E.L.D. Based on the Marvel Comics organization S.H.I.E.L.D., it follows Phil Coulson and his team of S.H.I.E.L.D. agents as they fight Hydra for a powerful artifact in the possession of the U.S. military. It is set in the Marvel Cinematic Universe (MCU) and acknowledges the franchise's films. The episode was written by Jed Whedon and Maurissa Tancharoen, and was directed by Vincent Misiano.

Clark Gregg reprises his role as Coulson from the film series, and is joined by principal cast members Ming-Na Wen, Brett Dalton, Chloe Bennet, Iain De Caestecker, Elizabeth Henstridge, and Nick Blood. The series was renewed for a second season in May 2014, and production began that July. That month, guest star Lucy Lawless's role was revealed, building hype for her appearance, although her character was always intended to be killed off at the end of the episode. Other guest stars include Hayley Atwell, Neal McDonough, and Kenneth Choi, reprising their roles from previous MCU projects in a sequence that ties-in with another MCU television series, Agent Carter. Series composer Bear McCreary used Christopher Lennertz's Agent Carter theme when writing the music for this sequence.

"Shadows" originally aired on ABC on September 23, 2014, and according to Nielsen Media Research, was watched by 5.98 million viewers, considerably less than the first season premiere. However, the episode received a positive critical response, with the majority of critics finding many improvements over previous episodes, and feeling it to be a promising start to the new season. The inclusion of Marvel characters such as Carl Creel and Atwell's Peggy Carter were particularly praised.

== Plot ==
In 1945 Austria, agents Peggy Carter, Dum Dum Dugan, and Jim Morita of the Strategic Scientific Reserve (SSR), the precursor to S.H.I.E.L.D., attack the last known Hydra base following the defeat of the Red Skull, (Note: As depicted in Captain America: The First Avenger.) and arrest the Hydra agents, including their leader, Werner Reinhardt. They confiscate all Hydra weaponry and technology they find, including a blue body and the mysterious Obelisk.

In the present day, former S.H.I.E.L.D. agent Roger Browning is attempting to sell information about the Obelisk to Agent Isabelle Hartley and her mercenary colleagues Lance Hunter and Idaho, all working undercover for S.H.I.E.L.D., when Browning is murdered by Carl Creel, who can "absorb" the properties of any substance he touches.

At the Playground, the former SSR base that now serves as S.H.I.E.L.D.'s headquarters, Director Phil Coulson recognizes the importance of the Obelisk, noting that it is the first 0-8-4, an object of unknown origin. Hydra double-agent, and S.H.I.E.L.D. prisoner, Grant Ward tells Agent Skye of secret frequencies Hydra uses to communicate, and Agent Billy Koenig intercepts Creel's next directive—to use the family of Brigadier General Glenn Talbot as leverage to find the Obelisk. Agent Melinda May, Skye, Hunter, and Hartley help Talbot fight off Creel, before abducting Talbot and deceiving him into giving them access codes for a U.S. military base near Washington, D.C. that contains numerous confiscated S.H.I.E.L.D. assets.

All available S.H.I.E.L.D. field operatives infiltrate the base, and Hartley finds the Obelisk, which begins to kill her. Hunter and Idaho flee with Hartley, desperate to save her life, while the other agents carry out Coulson's orders to steal a S.H.I.E.L.D. quinjet. Mechanic Alphonso "Mack" Mackenzie questions why Coulson would risk lives just to steal a quinjet, but Coulson explains that they need its ability to literally disappear, something they currently cannot do themselves following the injuries engineer Agent Leo Fitz recently suffered at the hands of Ward; he now struggles with technology and hallucinates the presence of Agent Jemma Simmons, who left S.H.I.E.L.D. some time earlier because of Fitz's condition.

Creel turns himself into tarmac in front of the vehicle that Idaho, Hartley, and Hunter are in, causing it to flip. Hartley and Idaho are killed, and Creel retrieves the Obelisk for his employer, Sunil Bakshi. In an end tag, Bakshi is shown to be working for Reinhardt, now going by the name Daniel Whitehall, who does not appear to have aged since 1945.

== Production ==
=== Development and writing ===
The series was renewed for a second season on May 8, 2014, and production began in late July 2014. In September 2014, Marvel announced that the premiere episode of the season would be titled "Shadows", to be written by executive producers Jed Whedon and Maurissa Tancharoen, with Vincent Misiano directing.

In July 2014, Gregg stated that the season resumes "months later" from the end of season one, adding, "The monumental nature of [rebuilding] is made very clear almost immediately, because you realize everyone – US government, US military and other wise – wants to arrest us. S.H.I.E.L.D.'s illegal. We have very few resources. Everything we're going to do involves dealing with, still, finding out who's Hydra and who's not amongst our friends. To rebuild S.H.I.E.L.D., we're going to need some old friends to prove themselves, some new friends, and we're going to have to do it in a way that's very back alley, old school."

Speaking about the reveal that Fitz was just imagining the presence of Simmons due to the injuries he sustained at the end of the first season, Tancharoen said, "We didn't want him to come out of that experience unscathed. He clearly suffered major trauma to his body. The lack of oxygen to his brain has to have consequences because that's how it is in real life. We wanted there to be a price. Basically, he in his own Fitz way had professed his love for her, and then he came out of that. How do you come out of that experience without any physical damage, there would still be probably a change to their relationship because the feelings are out in the open. But, of course, being the people that we are, we wanted to make it even more painful and compound it." Costume designer Ann Foley dressed Simmons in the same costume she wore in "FZZT" because that was a significant memory of Simmons for Fitz.

On whether the episode was ever going to explore the relationship between Hartley and Victoria Hand, a character featured in the first season of the series and whose comic book-counterpart was in a relationship with a character called Isabelle, Tancharoen said "There were versions, but it started to be irresponsible if we addressed it to not address it with more weight and time and energy."

=== Casting ===
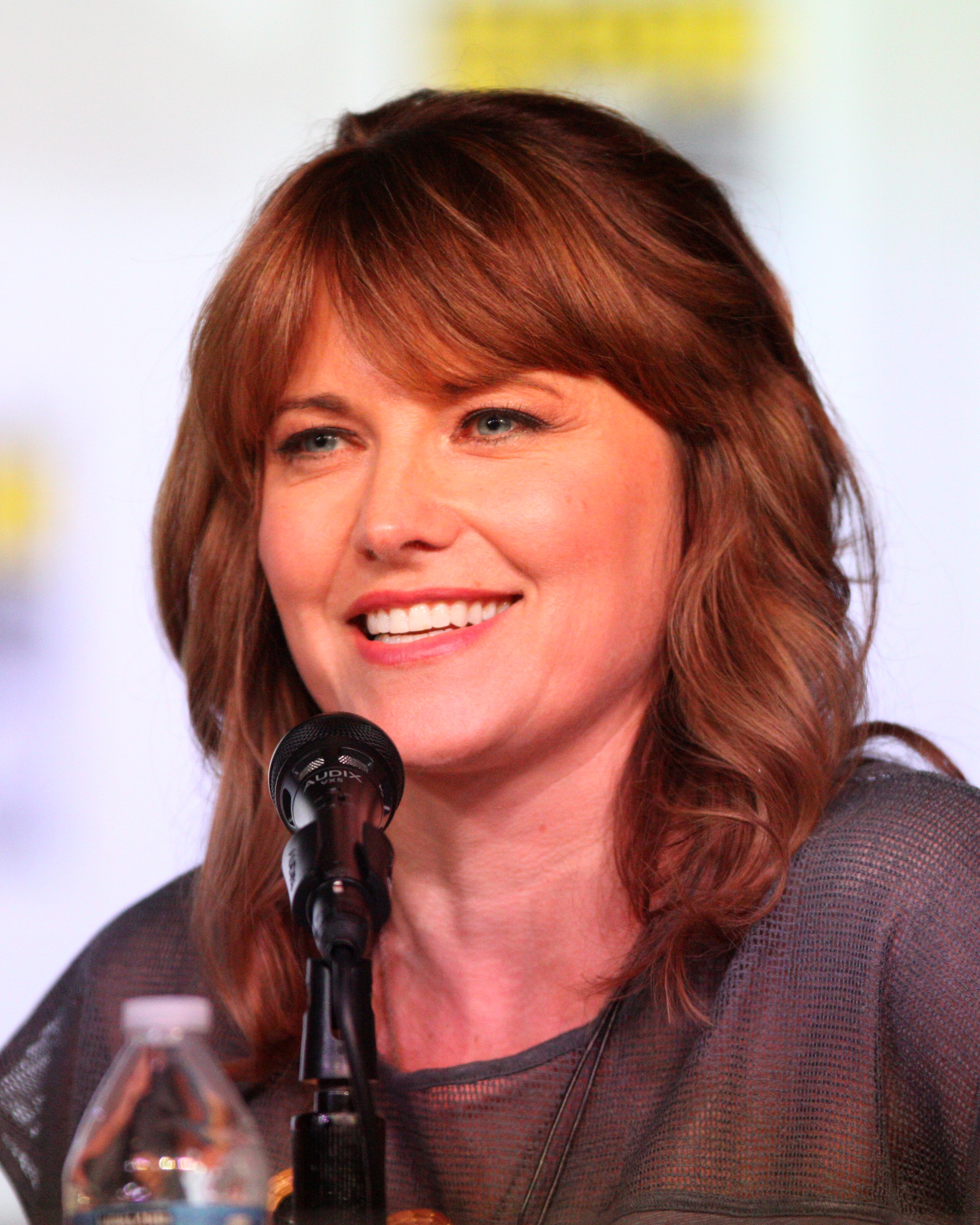
The casting of guest star Lucy Lawless built a lot of hype for the episode.

In July 2014, Lucy Lawless was revealed to be involved in the second season. At the 2014 San Diego Comic-Con, Lawless' role was revealed to be that of Isabelle Hartley, a longtime S.H.I.E.L.D. veteran. About the decision to cast Lawless as Hartley, who was always intended to be killed off at the end of the episode, Whedon said "We wanted you to invest in the character and feel like this person was a real equal to Coulson. She definitely fit the bill on that front. Lucy has such a strength to her. We didn't want people to know what was going to happen. We wanted it to feel like a big deal."

At the 2014 San Diego Comic-Con, Nick Blood and Reed Diamond were announced as cast in the roles of Lance Hunter, a mercenary, and Daniel Whitehall, a member of Hydra, respectively. In September 2014, Marvel confirmed that all principal cast members from the first season (Clark Gregg as Phil Coulson, Ming-Na Wen as Melinda May, Brett Dalton as Grant Ward, Chloe Bennet as Skye, Iain De Caestecker as Leo Fitz, and Elizabeth Henstridge as Jemma Simmons) would return, that Blood would join them for the second season. They also confirmed that Diamond and Lawless would guest star in "Shadows", along with B. J. Britt as Antoine Triplett, Adrian Pasdar as Glenn Talbot, Henry Simmons as Alphonso "Mack" Mackenzie, Patton Oswalt as Billy Koenig, Wilmer Calderon as Idaho, Brian Patrick Wade as Carl Creel, Matthew Glave as Roger Browning, and Simon Kassianides as Sunil Bakshi. Britt, Oswalt, and Pasdar reprise their roles from the first season. George Stephanopoulos makes a cameo appearance as himself.

It was also revealed in September that Hayley Atwell would reprise her role of Peggy Carter from Captain America: The First Avenger, Captain America: The Winter Soldier, and the Marvel One-Shot Agent Carter, in the episode, ahead of starring in her own series, also titled Agent Carter. A still image of Atwell's cameo was released on September 10, 2014, revealing that Neal McDonough and Kenneth Choi would also be appearing in the episode. They reprise their roles of Timothy "Dum Dum" Dugan and Jim Morita, respectively, from Captain America: The First Avenger. McDonough also previously portrayed Dugan in the One-Shot Agent Carter.

=== Music ===
Composer Bear McCreary changed his synth programming for the series from "warm, round tones" to a "mangled under heavy distortion" sound. He began the episode without any synths, describing his music for the episode's opening scene as "among the most shamelessly orchestral I've ever done for this series ... I wanted the score to feel like it belonged in the 1940s, with a retro, adventurous attitude." Then, "just as the audience begins to get used to" the orchestral sound, the episode cuts to "modern day and suddenly I bring in the new synths, with distorted basses blazing over the nastiest groove I've ever written for the show. The transition is hopefully as jarring as I intended—jumping from soaring orchestra to blasting electronica, as we leap forward in time seventy years."

With the appearance of Carter, McCreary decided to quote the Agent Carter theme composed by Christopher Lennertz for the Agent Carter One-Shot. On using Lennertz's theme, McCreary said, "I was excited for the opportunity to incorporate his music into my S.H.I.E.L.D. score, because it further cements the Marvel [Cinematic] Universe together as a coherent whole ... Chris was thrilled and sent me his scores for reference." On his use of the theme, McCreary stated, as Carter "storms in, the first violins state an elongated version of her theme soaring above an aggressive, orchestral ostinato". McCreary also introduced a new Hydra theme in the episode that represents Daniel Whitehall, and is used in scenes featuring the Obelisk and Carl Creel. About the theme, McCreary said "In true bad-guy-theme fashion, the theme is constructed from distantly related minor chords, and contains lots of close intervals. I build a theme like this so it can easily [move] into increasingly dissonant variations. For example, the E♭ in the C minor chord will clash against the E minor, as will the B♭ in the G minor chord. Building the theme in this way means that, in the future, I can put this theme over any pedal tone bass note and it will always sound dissonant."

=== Marvel Cinematic Universe tie-ins ===
In September 2014, executive producer Jeffrey Bell explained how the season would interact with Agent Carter saying, "Agent Carter seems to be about SSR pre-S.H.I.E.L.D., but about the beginnings of something, and the basic values of that. S.H.I.E.L.D. got blown up last year and what Coulson always wanted was a return to basics, and it gives us an opportunity to return to some of those core values and even physically, some of that SSR stuff has a way of finding its way into our show that could be cool. Anyway we can tie things together, we're going to try to do it, but it is hard when the stories are 60 years apart." Ultimately, the opening scene of "Shadows" serves as an introduction to the world of Agent Carter with the inclusion of Atwell as Carter, setting up characters and ideas for that series, including the then unconfirmed involvement of Howard Stark, who is mentioned in the scene, as well as Carter's belief in the need for "a permanent unit during peacetime", which will lead to the creation of S.H.I.E.L.D.

== Release ==
=== Broadcast ===
"Shadows" was first aired in the United States on ABC on September 23, 2014. It was aired alongside the U.S. broadcast in Canada on CTV.

=== Home media ===
The episode began streaming on Netflix on June 11, 2015, and was released along with the rest of the second season on September 18, 2015, on Blu-ray and DVD. The episode, along with the rest of the series, was removed from Netflix on February 28, 2022, and later became available on Disney+ on March 16, 2022.

== Reception ==
=== Ratings ===
In the United States the episode received a 2.1/6 percent share among adults between the ages of 18 and 49, meaning that it was seen by 2.1 percent of all households, and 6 percent of all of those watching television at the time of the broadcast. It was watched by 5.98 million viewers. The Canadian broadcast gained 2.62 million viewers, the third highest for that day and the sixth highest for the week.

=== Critical response ===
Eric Goldman of IGN scored the episode an 8.3 out of 10, praising the visual style, which he called "less glossy" than previous episodes, as well as the introduction of new characters and development of old ones, especially the introduction of Carl Creel and the "nicely done FX showing off his power". He did note that the episode "did little to actually give Hunter or Mack distinguishing personalities [sic]" and stated "I don't really buy that Fitz would even be there, working alongside the team, at this point. Doesn't he have friends or family he could be with?" Marc Buston for Den of Geek scored the episode 4.5 stars out of 5, feeling that the series had finally reached its potential by incorporating Marvel elements such as Creel and Whitehall, while also creating a darker tone and developing the original characters. He specifically highlighted the changes made to Fitz's character, saying "This lair of tragedy greatly deepens Fitz's character and gives the comic relief of last season a heartbreaking edge." James Hunt, also for Den of Geek, gave a positive review as well, stating "The momentum of last season's finale hasn't been lost, and indeed, it's even been added to. Last year I criticised the pilot episode for, above all else, failing to recreate the feel of the Marvel Cinematic Universe. This year, it's only fair that I praise the season opener for doing exactly that." He did feel, however, that the opening sequence featuring Carter was "by some distance, the most exciting part of the episode". Kevin Fitzpatrick at ScreenCrush called the premiere "unexpectedly good", noting that the series "remains as serialized a show as it can over 22 episodes", introducing interesting ideas for the rest of the season, while also setting a high standard for subsequent episodes to meet. He concluded that the series "definitely seems to have hit a major groove".

Alan Sepinwall at HitFix called the episode a promising and lively start to the season despite a lot of exposition, "helped by some good casting and smart creative choices". He was positive about both the changes to the existing characters and the introduction of the new ones, especially Creel, and though he noted that the opening sequence was "itself a piece of brand extension—early promotion for Agent Carter," he felt that "links to the rest of the Marvel [Cinematic] Universe are always welcome when they're in service to the story the show is telling". Oliver Sava of The A.V. Club graded the episode a 'B−', feeling that "With a clearly defined villain and mission statement, this show's second season is already off to a better start than its first year, but there's still plenty of room for the series to grow. The scripts could use more energy, the action could be better choreographed, and it could use a huge injection of style for both the visual and audio elements. There's so much potential in Agents Of S.H.I.E.L.D. ... but the show's creators aren't fully exploring it yet." Kathrine Siegel of Paste gave a negative review of the episode, calling it "pretty flat, and very disappointing as season premieres go", feeling that the character development and plot were limited, lamenting the decision to kill off Lawless' character, and stating that the episode continued a trend of the series having "amazing individual parts [that] never come together to create a solid whole."

Multiple critics positively compared the character of Grant Ward, and his new position as a traitor and prisoner, to the character of Hannibal Lecter, though it was acknowledged that the situation would likely change in upcoming episodes. Also, the plot twist that the character of Fitz had been hallucinating the presence of Simmons all along was compared to the works of M. Night Shyamalan.
