= Desecrated (film) =

- Directed by: Rob Federic
- Written by: Cecil Chambers
- Produced by: Cecil Chambers; E. Dylan Costa; Chris Nassif
- Starring: Haylie Duff; Michael Ironside; Gonzalo Menendez; Gib Gerard; Paul James; Wilmer Calderon; Heather Sossaman
- Cinematography: Bruce Logan
- Edited by: E. Dylan Costa; Robert A. Feretti
- Production companies: Evenflow Entertainment; Triumphant Pictures
- Distributed by: Uncork'd Entertainment
- Release date: 26 January 2015
- Running time: 82 minutes
- Country: United States
- Language: English

Desecrated is a 2015 American slasher film directed by Rob Federic and written by Cecil Chambers, starring Haylie Duff, Michael Ironside, Gonzalo Menendez, Gib Gerard, Paul James, Wilmer Calderon and Heather Sossaman.

== Cast ==
- Haylie Duff as Allie McClean
- Michael Ironside as Tom McClain
- Gonzalo Menendez as Ben
- Gib Gerard as Evan
- Paul James as Marcus
- Wilmer Calderon as Eduardo
- Heather Sossaman as Lizzie
- Skyler Stone as Larry
- Charlie Babcock as Joey
- Ryan Melander as Trent
- Mary LeGault as Meghan
- Kayla Shaughnessy as Robyn
- Vera Rosada as Nina
- Jack Rain as Timmy

== Release ==
The film was released to DVD in the United States in January 2015. It was released to DVD and VOD in the United Kingdom on 16 May 2016.

== Reception ==
Richelle Charkot of Horror DNA rated the film 2.5 stars out of 5 and wrote that while it "has a very amateur script and production quality and is by no means a good film", it is "not the train wreck that it could be." Michael DeFillipo of Horror Society gave the film a score of 5/10 and stated that the "only real problem here is that Desecrated is nothing new." Joel Harley of Starburst wrote that the film "is like every budget backwoods horror film you’ve ever seen, balled up into one, without any invention or ideas of its own." Daniel Goodwin of Scream rated the film 1 star out of 5 and wrote that it "goes some way to testing our affection by insipidly worming every stalk-and-slash trait into a skeletal plot-line and then cosmically botching the execution."
