= Jak X: Combat Racing =

2005 video game

- North American cover art
- Developer: Naughty Dog
- Publisher: Sony Computer Entertainment
- Director: Amy Hennig
- Producer: Elodie Hummel
- Designers: Hirokazu Yasuhara; Richard Lemarchand
- Programmers: Christopher Christensen; Neil Druckmann
- Artists: Bob Rafei; Erick Pangilinan; Josh Scherr
- Writer: Daniel Arey
- Composers: Billy Howerdel; Dean Menta; Larry Hopkins
- Series: Jak and Daxter
- Platform: PlayStation 2
- Release: NA: October 18, 2005; AU: October 26, 2005; EU: November 4, 2005
- Genre: Vehicular combat
- Modes: Single-player, multiplayer

Jak X: Combat Racing (Note: Known in Europe and Oceania as simply Jak X) is a 2005 vehicular combat video game developed by Naughty Dog and published by Sony Computer Entertainment for the PlayStation 2 (PS2). A spin-off following Jak 3 (2004), it follows protagonist Jak and his allies who, after being poisoned, must compete in a combat racing championship to obtain an antidote.

The gameplay differs from previous installments in the series, focusing on arcade racing rather than action-adventure gameplay. The driving mechanics of the game were modeled after the previous entry in the series, Jak 3. Furthermore, Combat Racing was the first Jak and Daxter game to feature a multiplayer mode, with the second being Daxter. In 2017, the game was re-released for the PlayStation 4, alongside Jak and Daxter: The Precursor Legacy, Jak II, and Jak 3, all of which later became available on PlayStation 5 through backwards compatibility.

== Gameplay ==
In Combat Racing, the player controls characters from the Jak and Daxter series, all of which race in customizable dune buggy-style vehicles. The two main modes of play in the game are Adventure and Exhibition. Jak, the main character of the series, is the only playable character in the Adventure mode, and must participate in a series of Eco Cup Championships in the game's story to obtain an antidote to a poison he and his comrades have consumed. Jak can also take part in a variety of Events in the Championships as to earn Medal Points and advance through the ranks. The main event of the game is the Circuit Race, in which Jak must finish a set of laps in a course while avoiding the wrath of the other racers. The player can destroy these racers as well by picking up Yellow and Red Eco weapons, with Yellow Eco acting as an offensive weapon made to attack and destroy opponents, and Red Eco acting as a defensive weapon made to protect the player from incoming attacks. Green and Blue Eco can also be picked up, acting as health recovery and turbo respectively. Causing and taking damage causes a Dark Eco meter to fill up which, once full, causes weapons to become more potent versions of themselves. Save data from the first three Jak and Daxter games, Daxter and Ratchet: Deadlocked unlock several drivers for the game, including Ratchet from Ratchet & Clank. For the PlayStation 4 port, the save data of the PS4 ports of the first three Jak and Daxter games, Uncharted: The Nathan Drake Collection and Ratchet & Clank (2016) are required to unlock the content.

== Plot ==
A year after the Dark Maker threat has been stopped, (Note: As depicted in Jak 3 (2004)) the rebuilt Haven City thrives, and the sport of Combat Racing gains traction in the gritty, gangster-ridden Kras City. Jak, Daxter, Ashelin, Samos, Keira, and Torn are summoned to Kras for the reading of the late crime lord Krew's last will, hosted by his daughter, Rayn. The group is shocked when Krew reveals in the recording that they have been poisoned during a toast and must compete in the Combat Racing Championship to win an antidote held by Krew's associates. The championship is co-hosted by the television presenter GT Blitz and Pecker.

Jak learns that the competing racers are tied to a crime syndicate led by the mysterious Mizo. During the gang's racing, Keira acts as their primary mechanic, eventually building faster and stronger new vehicles to aid Jak in his races. Her true wish is to race alongside her friends but Samos forbids it, fearing for her safety. Sig also appears to assist the crew, whereas Kleiver appears to challenge Jak with a friendly rivalry. Mizo's right-hand man, Razer, a famous racer, returns from retirement. Finally another competitor enters for Mizo, an ex-Krimzon Guard robot known as UR-86. During the continuing competitions, stories of Blitz's father enter the mix as his father was a legendary racer for the Kras City Grand Championship, while Rayn continues to search through her father's video diaries searching for more information on Mizo and any information that may assist the team in defeating him. Animosity grows between Mizo's racers and Rayn, Jak and the gang as Jak continues to win races making Mizo more and more desperate.

As the final race approaches, GT Blitz enters as a mystery racer for Mizo's team. Keira finally jumps into the race as well. Jak completes and wins the Kras City Grand Championship. Blitz angrily storms over to Rayn claiming she cheated before revealing himself to be Mizo. After being subsequently exposed by Pecker, Mizo then steals the antidote and drives off with Jak in pursuit. Jak manages to damage Mizo's car enough that he ends up in a fiery crash. As Jak retrieves the antidote, Mizo mentions his father's "sick" love of racing and how his father's neglect to his family in the name of the sport caused his family to strive to own all of it, to the point that Mizo murdered his father. Mizo taunts the indifferent Jak before his car explodes, killing him.

Jak and the team celebrate with drinks at a bar where Samos commends Keira's driving. Rayn bids the team farewell, but leaves behind a figment of Krew's video diary revealing Rayn's complicity: she knew about the poison and orchestrated events to secure her family’s dominance in Kras’s criminal underworld, ensuring her own safety. In a phone call, Rayn spares Jak and his friends, acknowledging their bond but hinting at future distance. Choosing not to pursue her, Jak and the team continue to celebrate, and Jak and Keira finally share a kiss at Daxter's encouragement to which he remarks, "Now that's what I call a photo finish!"

== Development ==
Naughty Dog selected Jak X: Combat Racing as their next project whilst three fourths of the way through the development of Jak 3. The company wanted to expand on the vehicle aspects of Jak 3. Bob Rafei was the game's art director, splitting his time with pre-production on Uncharted: Drake's Fortune (2007).

=== Music ===
The soundtrack for the game was composed primarily by Billy Howerdel of A Perfect Circle, with assistance from members of various other bands, including The Crystal Method, Limp Bizkit, Tool, The Offspring, Faith No More, Nine Inch Nails and Queens of the Stone Age (the game's intro sequence features songs from the latter, taken from their album Songs for the Deaf). The cutscene music was solely composed by Larry Hopkins.

== Reception ==
Reception

Aggregate score
Aggregator	Score
Metacritic	76/100

Review scores
Publication	Score
Eurogamer	7/10
GamePro	3.5/5
GameSpot	7.9/10
GameSpy	4/5
IGN	8/10

Jak X: Combat Racing received "generally favorable reviews", according to review aggregator Metacritic. GameSpot gave the game 7.9 out of 10 praising the game's graphics and online multiplayer system while criticizing the game's difficulty in certain modes. Eurogamer rated the title 7 out of 10. They were impressed by the game's sensation of speed, the variety provided by the different modes and the online functionality but thought it suffered from the occasional difficulty spike and "loose, floaty handling" of the vehicles. IGN thought that the game was "a nicely presented, well-rounded combat racer" which benefited from a strong storyline and multiple play modes which made it good value, and gave it an 8 out of 10 overall score. It was later added to the Sony's Greatest Hits section.
