= Bob Rafei =

Iranian video game developer

- Born: Babak Rafei; 1969 (age 56–57)
- Education: BFA, Illustration
- Alma mater: Parsons School of Design '91
- Occupations: Art director; character animator; concept artist
- Years active: 1995–present
- Employer: Naughty Dog (1995–2007)
- Organization(s): Big Red Button Entertainment, Inc. (CEO)

Babak "Bob" Rafei (Persian: بابک رافعی) is an Iranian video game art director, character animator and concept artist. He is the chief executive officer (CEO) of Big Red Button Entertainment, a video game development studio he co-founded with Jeff Lander in 2009.

Rafei was an advisory board member for Game Developers Conference and Game Developers Choice Awards, as well as panel leader of Academy of Interactive Arts & Sciences's achievement awards category on Art Direction and contributing writer of Animation Magazine and Animation World Network.

A graduate of Parsons School of Design, Rafei was an employee of Naughty Dog, joining them in early 1995 to work on Crash Bandicoot (1996). Other notable works include the Jak and Daxter series, Uncharted: Drake's Fortune (2007), and Sonic Boom: Rise of Lyric (2014).

Rafei previously worked on album cover arts for A&M Records, most notably Blues Traveler's Travelers and Thieves (1991).

== Games ==
As graphics artist

- Star Trek Generations: Beyond the Nexus (1994)

As art director

- Crash Bandicoot (1996)
- Crash Bandicoot 2: Cortex Strikes Back (1997)
- Crash Bandicoot: Warped (1998)
- Crash Team Racing (1999)
- Jak and Daxter: The Precursor Legacy (2001)
- Jak II (2003)
- Jak 3 (2004)
- Jak X: Combat Racing (2005)
- Uncharted: Drake's Fortune (2007)

As concept artist

- Jak and Daxter: The Lost Frontier (2009)

As game director

- Sonic Boom: Rise of Lyric (2014)
- The Divergent Series: Allegiant VR Experience (2016)
- John Wick Chronicles (2017)
- The Arcslinger (2018)
