= Daxter (video game) =

2006 video game

- North American box art
- Developer: Ready at Dawn
- Publisher: Sony Computer Entertainment
- Producer: Naughty Dog
- Designer: Michael John
- Programmer: Andrea Pessino
- Artist: Ru Weerasuriya
- Composer: Jamey Scott
- Series: Jak and Daxter
- Platforms: PlayStation Portable; PlayStation 4 PlayStation 5
- Release: NA: March 14, 2006; EU: April 13, 2006; AU: April 28, 2006
- Genre: Platform
- Mode: Single-player

Daxter is a 2006 platform video game developed by Ready at Dawn and published by Sony Computer Entertainment for the PlayStation Portable. A spin-off of the Jak and Daxter series, Daxter takes place during the two-year timeskip occurring during the opening cutscene of Jak II; unlike the other installments of the franchise focusing primarily on Jak, the game focuses on the adventures of his sidekick Daxter while Jak is imprisoned.

Daxter received generally positive reviews from critics and the game had sold more than 2.3 million units by June 2008.

The game was re-released on the PlayStation 4 and PlayStation 5 in June 2024.

== Gameplay ==
Players assume the role of Daxter in his role as a bug exterminator, while he is searching for his friend Jak throughout the game's story. Daxter can perform double jumping and ledge grabbing, can crouch to squeeze through narrow gaps, make use of trampolines to reach higher ledges and ride on ziplines, and make use of vehicles to move around the game's semi-open world. The world is seamless with little to no loading screens. Portals and gateways are encountered within the main environment which lead to locations containing missions that players must complete in order to advance the story.

Combat in the game focuses mainly on melee attacks using an electronic blue eco powered bug-swatter, with players able to perform combo attacks on multiple enemies. After the initial missions, the player gains access to an extermination tank which sprays green eco-based bug spray to stun enemies, with it later able to be upgraded with several new functions, including a jet pack to allow Daxter to fly, a flamethrower modification which can improve the effectiveness of the jet pack, and an ultrasonic attachment that shoots blue eco-based high radial damage projectiles. Damage taken from enemies and certain environmental hazards can be recovered by collecting green eco health packs, while the spray tank's supply can be regenerated by absorbing green eco clusters.

Two forms of collectibles can be found during the game, including Golden Bug-Gems, similar to the Metalhead Gems from the second and third installment of the Jak and Daxter series, along with the traditional Precursor Orbs, the latter of which can be used to unlock special features. In addition, players can unlock unique items by breaking picture frames found hidden throughout the game, and with a Jak X game connected to Daxter, can alter the character's goggles and, if the connected save file is 100% complete, a modified Hover Scooter paint scheme.

== Plot ==
The game takes place in the final months of the two-year gap presented in the opening of Jak II (and the aftermath of The Precursor Legacy), between the moment when Jak is taken prisoner by the Krimzon Guard and the time in which Daxter finally rescues him from the Krimzon Guard Fortress. The introduction shows Jak being captured, while Daxter manages to escape. Almost two years later (having no luck with rescuing Jak), Daxter has forgotten all about finding his friend. An old man named Osmo, whom Daxter meets, hires Daxter as an exterminator working in various parts of Haven City, and occasionally its environs, to exterminate bug-like Metal Heads referred to in-game as 'Metal Bugs'. During his adventures, Daxter meets a mysterious woman named Taryn who, despite being less than impressed by Daxter's interest in her, occasionally helps him.

After completing a number of missions for Osmo, Daxter sees Jak in a Prison Zoomer and attempts to chase after it. After being cornered by Krimzon Guards (who had noticed Daxter's pursuit), Daxter is rescued by Osmo's son Ximon, who assists him with several more missions including one to Baron Praxis' palace where Daxter steals a map of the Fortress, the prison where Jak is being held. After returning to the extermination shop, an arthropod sidekick that Daxter acquired earlier is killed by Kaeden, a bitter man who seemingly wants to steal Osmo's shop, but, in actuality, is working for Kor, the Metal Head leader.

When Daxter tries to stop Kaeden from escaping the shop, Kaeden suddenly blows up the shop with a bomb he placed in the shop earlier. Daxter and Osmo survive, and Daxter promises to stop Kaeden, but only after he rescues Jak. Daxter infiltrates the Fortress and finds Kaeden, who reveals himself to be a giant Metal Bug. Daxter manages to defeat Kaeden, who tries to warn him that Kor is waiting outside for them, and then uses a hover platform to begin searching for Jak within the Fortress, leading into the opening cutscene from Jak II. After this, the game cuts to a point later in the timeline at Daxter's Naughty Ottsel Bar, where he is recounting the story to Jak, Keira, Samos, Tess, and Taryn.

== Reception ==
Reception

Aggregate score
Aggregator	Score
Metacritic	85/100

Review scores
Publication	Score
Eurogamer	9/10
GamePro	4/5
GameSpot	9.1/10
GameSpy	4.5/5
IGN	9.0/10
PlayStation Official Magazine – UK	9/10

=== Critical reception ===
Daxter received "generally favorable" reviews from critics, according to review aggregator website Metacritic.

Daxter is regarded as one of the PSP's best titles by a number of websites. GamesRadar+ ranked Daxter the 4th best PSP game ever made, calling it "an absolute must-play for the PSP enthusiast." Kotaku cited it as one of the 12 best PSP games, claiming it's "as funny as it is well-tuned." Additionally, Digital Trends and TechRadar each listed Daxter among the 10 best PSP games, with the former specifying that "Daxter's vibrant colors and subtle details inject the game with a ton of flair." During the 10th Annual Interactive Achievement Awards, the Academy of Interactive Arts & Sciences nominated Daxter for "Action/Adventure Game of the Year", "Outstanding Achievement in Animation", and "Outstanding Achievement in Character Performance – Male" for Max Casella's vocal role as Daxter.

=== Sales ===
By June 2008, Daxter had sold over 2.3 million units.
