= Jak 3 =

2004 video game

- North American cover art
- Developer: Naughty Dog
- Publisher: Sony Computer Entertainment
- Directors: Jason Rubin; Amy Hennig
- Designers: Evan Wells; Richard Lemarchand; Hirokazu Yasuhara
- Programmers: Andy Gavin; Christopher Christensen; Neil Druckmann; Christophe Balestra; Dan Liebgold
- Artists: Bob Rafei; Bruce Straley; Erick Pangilinan; Josh Scherr
- Writer: Daniel Arey
- Composers: Josh Mancell; Larry Hopkins
- Series: Jak and Daxter
- Platform: PlayStation 2
- Release: NA: November 9, 2004; AU: November 2004; EU: November 26, 2004
- Genres: Action-adventure, platform
- Mode: Single-player

Jak 3 is a 2004 action-adventure platformer video game developed by Naughty Dog and published by Sony Computer Entertainment for the PlayStation 2 (PS2). The game is the sequel to Jak II (2003) and serves as the conclusion of the trilogy. The story of the previous games continues as the player takes on the dual role of recurring protagonists Jak and Daxter. It adds new weapons, devices and playable areas. A spin-off, Jak X: Combat Racing, was released in 2005. A remastered version was released as part of the Jak and Daxter Collection in 2012, and a limited edition physical version for the PlayStation 4 was released by Limited Run Games in 2019.

== Gameplay ==
Gameplay screenshot of Jak 3. The player uses Dark Jak, returning from Jak II (2003), to fight enemies

Like its predecessor, the gameplay of Jak 3 is a blend of platforming, racing, and gun combat. The player is led through the story as they complete missions, assigned by the various characters in the game. Missions can consist of anything from defeating particular enemies, reaching a specific location, or completing a puzzle. With the exception of timed or otherwise linear missions, the player is free to explore the massive game world as they see fit.

Secrets, made available as the player progresses and collects elusive Precursor orbs, can be purchased and toggled, allowing the player to access "cheats" such as upgraded weapons damage, weapon ammo, world mirroring, or invincibility.

There are some differences between Jak 3 and Jak II (2003). Most notably are the changes undergone in the Haven City environments. Spargus City, the Wasteland, and Haven City function as the main hubs in Jak 3, where leaper lizards, buggies, and zoomers respectively are the main sources of transportation. While Jak II provided the player with only four different types of guns, Jak 3 expands on the concept with two additional modifications for each gun giving Jak a powerful loadout of twelve weapons. Also, the "Dark Jak" form, introduced in Jak II, which allowed the player to transform into a more powerful offensive version of Jak, is countered by a "Light Jak" form that mainly focuses on defensive abilities. The jet-board makes a return appearance from Jak II to this game, with some additional upgrades as well.

== Plot ==
=== Setting ===
Like its predecessors, Jak 3 takes place on an unnamed planet, in which the inhabitants live in a harsh landscape, contending with various threats, while worshipping an ancient race known as the Precursors. The game's story is set a year after the events of Jak II, and takes place across three major regions: Haven City, a sprawling metropolis which was the central locale in Jak II; the Wasteland, a large desert expanse; and Spargus City, a large settlement bordering the Wasteland and an ocean.

Spargus City and the Wasteland feature much of the bulk of the game's story, and much larger area compared to Haven City, which is not accessible to begin with until the player makes progress in the story. Haven City features a new layout since the last game in which a number of districts have been altered or are no longer accessible, while a few new areas have added in. Players will get the opportunity to move between Haven, Spargus City and the Wasteland to access missions in both regions.

=== Characters ===
Jak 3's main protagonists are Jak, a young hero with dark eco powers, and his best friend Daxter, an ottsel - a fictional hybrid between an otter and a weasel. Many of the characters from Jak II return, including: Samos the Sage, Jak's mentor; Keira, Jak's mechanic friend and Samos' daughter; Ashelin, Governor of Haven City; Torn, former resistance leader now serving as commander of the Freedom League, a faction defending Haven City; Tess, Daxter's love interest working as a weapons designer; Sig, a skilled mercernary; Vin, a former resistance ally who made themselves into a computer AI; and Onin, a mystical fortune teller, aided by Pecker, her translator and a moncaw (a fictional hybrid between a monkey and a macaw.

New characters introduced to the game include: Damas, ruler of Spargus City, and former ruler of Haven City until his banishment by Baron Praxis; Kleiver, Damas right-hand man responsible for vehicle maintenance and mercernary allocations; and Seem, a Precursor Monk living in the Wasteland.

The game features three main antagonists: Errol, a former Krimzon Guard commander in Jak II, who underwent cybernetic surgery following a near-fatal explosion, before instigating a war using a factory to produce combat forces known as Deathbots; Count Veger, a self-absorbed Haven City aristocrat, who covets the ancient power of the Precursors; and the Dark Makers - former Precursors corrupted by Dark Eco, similar to the antagonists of The Precursor Legacy (2001), who are waging a war against their former kind across the worlds the Precursors formed.

=== Story ===
A year after Jak II, Haven City enters a new war between the Freedom League, a horde of surviving Metal Heads, and a new faction called Deathbots - combat robots originally designed by the Krimzon Guard that were recently activated. Following an attack on the city's palace, which destroys several districts, Count Veger blames Jak and Daxter for this and banishes them to the Wasteland, despite Ashelin and Samos opposing this. Both find themselves accompanied by Pecker, before all three are rescued by Damas, ruler of Spargus City, who traced them via a beacon Ashelin secretly supplied them. To earn Damas' trust, Jak and Daxter undertake several tasks for him and three others: Kleiver, Damas' right-hand man, who initially distrusts them; Seem, a Precursor Monk; and Sig, an old friend, who the pair discovers was a spy working for Damas within Haven City. During this time, Jax encounters a projection from a Precursor Oracle, who grants him Light Eco powers to balance out his Dark Eco abilities.

Ashelin eventually makes contact with the pair, but Jax refuses to return with her to Haven despite the war worsening. After he and Daxter witness a meeting between Veger and Seem, they decide to return to Haven after Pecker advises them to do so. Whilst using an old Precursor transit system, the group run into Veger, who reveals he attacked the palace, as he sought to uncover a hidden Precursor tunnel underneath it that leads to a site within the planet's core. Upon returning to Haven, the pair run into Samos and Kiera, but find themselves forced to assist League forces in the sout of the city, leading to them aiding Torn, commanding local troops, whilst receiving weapon mods from Tess, Daxter's girlfriend. Combatting attacks from Metal Heads and Deathbots, the pair manage to break through defensive barriers, allowing them to reach the League's headquarters.

During their missions in Haven and across the Wasteland, the pair discover the Deathbots are being led by Errol, the former commander of the Krimzon Guard, while they begin to encounter strange new creatures that are hostile. At Samos' advice regarding the creatures, the pair venture to a Precursor device, the Astro Viewer, to investigate a purple star that recently appeared in the sky. The device soon reveals the creatures to be Dark Makers - Precursors who were corrupted by Dark Eco - and that the star is a Dark Maker ship approaching the planet. Veger confirms their findings, but reveals the Precursors built a planetary defense system within the planet's core to counter the threat; however, when he offers to activate it in exchange for gaining access to the Precursors' power, Ashelin refuses, before stripping him of his title and disbanding Haven's council.

As Jak and Daxter work to weaken the Metal Heads and Deathbots, the pair continue to provide aid to Damas, who rewards them with components to a beacon that can summon him to them when needed. During this time, Jax bonds with Damas, who reveals himself to be Haven City's former ruler, until he was banished by Baron Praxis; but not before losing his son, Mar, during the chaos - whom Sig was tasked with finding. After finding a key needed to activate the planetary defense system, Samos instructs Jax and Daxter to reach the tunnel to the core, leading him to summons Damas to assist them. Although successful, Damas is fatally injured in the assault. Dying, he asks Jak to find Mar, passing him an amulet. Jax recognizes it as the same one his younger self wore, realizing he is Damas' son. Veger, arriving after his father dies, gloats over Jax's loss, revealing he was responsible for kidnapping him to conduct eco experiments upon him, until Samos' resistance movement rescued him during the fight against Praxis.

After Veger leaves for the core, Jak and Daxter pursue after him, seemingly arriving before him within a Precursor control chamber. Guided by the Oracle, Jak activates the defense system with the Precursor key, before being offered the right to become a Precursor; Veger, however, seizes the power for himself. When the Oracle reveals Errol is aboard the Dark Maker's ship intending to awaken them before the defense system is fully charged, Daxter berates the Precursors for making them do their own work. This causes the Oracle and their assistants to accidentally expose themselves, revealing the Precursors were really ottsels. Daxter delight in discovering this, after the Oracle reveals his transformation was a blessing, while Veger is horrified by this as he becomes an ottsel.

After the Oracle reveals they need Jak's help, he and Daxter head for the Dark Maker's ship to stop Errol. Although they succeed and the ship is destroyed, Errol takes control of a Dark Maker construct to attack them, leading the pair to defeat him in a final fight within the Wasteland. As the world celebrates their victory, Sig is made ruler of Spargus, while Kleiver makes Veger his new, unwilling sidekick. The Oracle, thanking the pair, gifts Daxter a pair of pants - and transforms Tess into an ottsel when she expresses a wish to have something similar - while offering to show Jak the universe as the Precursors prepare to fight back against the Dark Makers. However, Jak refuses due to "all their adventures ahead".

== Development and release ==
Jak 3 was developed by Naughty Dog for the PlayStation 2. Bob Rafei was the game's art and animation director. Jak 3 was first revealed to be in the works by one of Super Play's writers on January 8, 2004. While browsing the Naughty Dog offices, he saw early work being done with desert environments. It was first announced by Sony Computer Entertainment on February 24, 2004. On April 19, 2004, information was revealed about the plot and gameplay. The voice-acting was jointly recorded in the Los Angeles-based Pop Sound and the New York City-based Howard Schwartz Recording. It was released in North America on November 9, 2004, and in Europe on November 26, 2004.

== Music ==
Jak 3's soundtrack was composed by Josh Mancell and Larry Hopkins, with Mancell composing for the levels and Hopkins composing for the cutscenes. A three CD soundtrack, Jak 3 Official Soundtrack, was released as part of the Limited Run Games Jak 3 Collector's Edition for PlayStation 4 on April 26, 2019. Disc 1 and 2 contain the tracks composed by Josh Mancell and Disc 3 contains the tracks composed by Larry Hopkins. As of August 2026, this is the only official release of the game's soundtrack.

== Reception ==
Reception

Aggregate score
Aggregator	Score
Metacritic	84/100

Review scores
Publication	Score
Game Informer	9.25/10
GamePro	4.5/5
GameSpot	8.6/10
IGN	9.6/10
Play	9.5/10

Jak 3 received "generally positive reviews", according to review aggregator Metacritic. GameSpot gave it a score of 8.6/10, "Jak 3 is a game with exceptional production values and some of the nicest visuals on the PlayStation 2" and went on to praise the "Solid platforming action with even more weapons and abilities, tons of varied gameplay types, engrossing and well-told storyline, the trademark humor and plenty of unlockable secrets." Other praises have been given to the game for being reasonably easier in difficulty compared to its predecessor—which received common criticism for its insufficient number of checkpoints.

IGN wrote: "If you're looking for art and technical achievement, Jak has it…Jak is it. Characters animate so smoothly it actually makes playing other games painful. Painful, I say! And it never stutters, never glitches, never hitches, and never, ever lets up" and gave it a score of 9.6/10. It received a runner-up position in GameSpot's 2004 "Best Platformer" award category across all platforms, losing to Ratchet & Clank: Up Your Arsenal. During the 8th Annual Interactive Achievement Awards, Jak 3 received nominations for "Console Platform Action/Adventure Game of the Year" and "Outstanding Achievement in Animation" by the Academy of Interactive Arts & Sciences (AIAS).

On August 4, 2005, the game was added to the Greatest Hits collection.

== Ports and remasters ==
In 2012, Jak 3 was remastered in the Jak and Daxter Collection on the PlayStation 3, with the collection releasing on the PlayStation Vita a year later. In 2017, Jak 3 was made available on the PlayStation 4 via PlayStation 2 emulation, and later on the PlayStation 5 with improved performance. In 2019, Limited Run Games released two physical editions of the PS4 version: 7,500 copies of a standard edition and 2,500 copies of Jak 3 Collector's Edition, which included a three CD soundtrack, a behind the scenes "Design Bible" book, a two-sided poster, foil trading cards, a 16GB USB drive shaped like a PlayStation 2 Memory Card, and a 3-inch "Metal Morph-Gun Blaster Replica".

Like its predecessors before it, an unofficial PC port of the game was released by fans in 2026 as part of the OpenGOAL project.
