= Jak II =

2003 video game

- North American cover art
- Developer: Naughty Dog
- Publisher: Sony Computer Entertainment
- Director: Jason Rubin
- Designer: Hirokazu Yasuhara
- Artist: Bob Rafei
- Writer: Daniel Arey
- Composers: Josh Mancell; Larry Hopkins
- Series: Jak and Daxter
- Platform: PlayStation 2
- Release: NA: October 14, 2003; EU: October 2003
- Genre: Platform
- Mode: Single-player

Jak II (Note: Known in PAL regions as Jak II: Renegade) is a 2003 platform video game developed by Naughty Dog and published by Sony Computer Entertainment for the PlayStation 2 (PS2). A sequel to Jak and Daxter: The Precursor Legacy (2001), it places the protagonist Jak in the dystopian Haven City, where he pursues vengeance against the tyrannical Baron Praxis after two years of torturous experiments. The gameplay features a seamless open world driven by non-linear missions, melee combat complemented by a firearm, and vehicular travel by hoverboard or hovercars. Jak can transform into a powerful Dark Jak form and inflict devastating attacks against enemies.

Naughty Dog developed Jak II as a deliberate evolution from the lighter tone of its predecessor; they recognized that the maturing gaming audience favored the complex narratives and open-world freedom featured in sandbox games like Grand Theft Auto III (2001). Utilizing an advanced engine, the team crafted a vast, densely populated city with high fidelity visuals, fluid animations, and dynamic elements at a high frame rate. Upon release, Jak II was positively received for its genre fusion, narrative, and technical aspects, though the city navigation and difficulty were criticized. The game was commercially successful and was nominated for multiple awards. A sequel, Jak 3, was released in 2004. A remastered version was released as part of the Jak and Daxter Collection in 2012, and a limited edition physical version for the PlayStation 4 was released by Limited Run Games in 2019.

== Gameplay ==
Jak rides his Jet-Board through Haven City in this example of gameplay in Jak II.

Jak II is a 3D platform game with elements commonly found in action-adventure games. The player controls Jak, who must navigate the dystopian Haven City on a quest for vengeance against the tyrannical Baron Praxis, who subjected Jak to torturous experiments for two years. The game features a seamless open world, allowing free exploration across interconnected areas.

Jak's basic actions include running, jumping, double-jumping, crouching, and a rolling jump to reach distant platforms. Jak's combat moves include a spin attack, a dash-punch, a dive attack, and an uppercut. Jak's melee skills are complemented by the Morph-Gun, a firearm that can be upgraded and modified for different firepower capabilities. When Jak's health is depleted, he respawns in the beginning of the last section of the area he was located in. A quarter of Jak's health can be replenished by collecting Health Packs.

The Jet-Board enables faster travel and a variety of tricks. Carjacking Zoomers (hovering cars) of varying speed and durability also provides transportation around Haven City, and is sometimes required to complete an objective. Due to Praxis' experiments, Jak can absorb a substance known as Dark Eco in small concentrated amounts; the amount of collected Dark Eco is indicated by a meter on the lower-left corner of the screen. When the meter is full, Jak can transform into Dark Jak, a powerful form capable of melee abilities that can clear out multiple enemies. New abilities for Dark Jak can be obtained by exchanging Metal Head Skull Gems (gemstones collected from defeated enemies known as Metal Heads) with a mysterious teacher.

The game features a mission-based structure in which the player can choose tasks in any order. The missions encompass platforming, racing, mech suit operations, and protection tasks. Precursor Orbs, which unlock special options and features, can be found hidden within the game's environments.

== Plot ==
In Sandover Village, Jak, Daxter, Keira and Samos activate the mysterious Precursor Ring recovered from Gol and Maia's citadel (Note: As depicted in Jak and Daxter: The Precursor Legacy (2001)) using a Rift Rider vehicle. This triggers the emergence of monstrous creatures, including a massive beast searching for a "boy", forcing the group to flee through the Ring. The Rift Rider explodes, separating Jak and Daxter from Keira and Samos, and they crash-land 300 years into the future in Haven City, a dystopia ruled by the tyrannical Baron Praxis. Jak is captured by Praxis' police force, the Krimson Guards, and for two years he is subjected to brutal experiments infusing him with a substance known as Dark Eco. The experience transforms Jak into a vengeful figure capable of becoming Dark Jak. Daxter, after evading capture, infiltrates the fortress to rescue Jak, who breaks free using his new powers.

In Haven City, Jak and Daxter encounter Kor, an old man with a mysterious green-haired boy, who informs them of Praxis' oppressive rule and directs them to the Underground, a resistance group commanded by former Krimson Guard Torn and led by the Shadow (later revealed to be a younger version of Samos). After proving their loyalty by stealing Praxis' banner from Dead Town (the ruins of Sandover Village), Torn tasks them with missions that undermine the Baron, such as restoring water to the slums. During a mission to destroy an ammunition depot, they discover Krimson Guards supplying Dark Eco to Metal Heads, the creatures that attacked Sandover Village.

Through Torn, the duo meets Krew, a shady saloon owner who supplies the Underground with weapons and hires the two for tasks like eliminating Metal Heads and retrieving artifacts. Krew reveals Praxis' arrangement with the Metal Heads, in which Praxis exchanges Eco for controlled Metal Head attacks on the city to justify his regime. Jak and Daxter also meet Ashelin, Praxis' daughter and a conflicted Krimson Guard member, who is investigating her father's search for the tomb of Haven City's legendary founder Mar. The tomb holds the Precursor Stone, a powerful artifact that Mar hid from the Metal Heads, the ancient enemy and destroyer of the Precursor civilization. Praxis seeks the Stone to solidify his power, while the Metal Heads, led by their Leader (the large creature that emerged from the Ring), aim to consume its energy. Meanwhile, Jak reconnects with Keira, now a mechanic and racer, who is building a new Rift Rider to return them to their time.

To locate Mar's tomb, Jak and Daxter work with the blind and mute soothsayer Onin and her monkey-macaw hybrid interpreter Pecker, who task them with recovering artifacts that lead to its location. Within the tomb, Jak passes its tests of manhood, but Praxis, having followed him, makes off with the Precursor Stone. Ashelin informs him that Praxis and Krew are meeting at a weapons factory, where they are preparing to use a Piercer Bomb to crack the Precursor Stone open and release the energy inside. Jak and Daxter defeat the treacherous Krew and recover the Heart of Mar gemstone, a key component for Keira's Rift Rider, before leaving Krew to be caught in the Piercer Bomb's explosion. The city falls under siege as Kor reveals himself as the Metal Head Leader, having manipulated events to access the Stone. Praxis, mortally injured by the Metal Head Leader, reveals to Jak and Daxter a second Piercer Bomb with the Precursor Stone attached, and Daxter disarms the bomb to secure the Stone.

In a final confrontation at the Metal Head nest, the Leader reveals that the boy is Jak's younger self, who was born in Haven City and sent to the past to gain the strength needed to defeat him, and that the Stone houses a Precursor entity that only young Jak can release. After Jak defeats the Metal Head Leader, young Jak releases the Precursor entity, which declares the Precursors' war against the Metal Heads over and tells Jak that his Dark Eco corruption has been balanced with light. The young Jak and Samos are sent back to the past to fulfill their destinies, while the Precursor Ring is destroyed. Ashelin becomes Haven City's governor, and Torn leads the reformed Krimson Guards. Daxter rebrands Krew's saloon as the Naughty Ottsel, where the group celebrates their victory. Jak reflects on his younger self, and Samos hints at future adventures involving Mar.

== Development ==
Jak II entered pre-production shortly after the release of Jak and Daxter: The Precursor Legacy in December 2001. Naughty Dog conducted planning sessions in early 2002 at the Mammoth Mountain Resort in Mammoth Lakes, California, devising a radical reinvention for the sequel. While Jak and Daxter was commercially successful, it fell short of the Crash Bandicoot series' success; Naughty Dog co-founder Jason Rubin attributed this to the original game's insufficient maturity, noting the gaming audience's aging demographic. He elaborated that the original Crash Bandicoot (1996) targeted a younger market, while gamers in the 2000s were seeking advanced experiences beyond "fuzzy animal" antics. Naughty Dog diagnosed the genre's "malaise" and audience erosion as stemming from a lack of innovation amid evolving paradigms like the freedom offered by the sandbox game Grand Theft Auto III (2001). Recognizing the maturing gaming audience's desire for realistic themes and intense experiences, they decided to make Jak II darker and more emotionally layered, and build on the seamless load-free system to create a vast city in which they would place Jak, whose new persona would carry the more complex narrative.

The production involved 52 staff members and spanned two years with a budget of $15 million. Bob Rafei was the game's art and animation director and fully animated 15 of the game's cinematic cutscenes. Naughty Dog enhanced its engine, dubbed "Naughty Dog Engine 2.0" internally, increasing character polygon counts from 3,000–5,000 to 12,000–15,000, adding advanced shading, particle effects, and a day-night cycle while maintaining seamless loading and 60 frames per second. The game's open hub, Haven City, is 24 times larger than any level in the previous game, and is populated by procedurally generated non-player characters (NPCs) and dynamic traffic with drivable hover vehicles operating on dual traffic levels. Many of the environments were designed by Sonic the Hedgehog veteran Hirokazu Yasuhara. Contributions from Sony studios included Insomniac's polygon occlusion code from Ratchet & Clank (2002) and Zipper Interactive's progressive scan technology from SOCOM U.S. Navy SEALs (2002). Early screenshots of Kingdom Hearts (2002) pushed the team to enhance the cutscenes' visual fidelity by pivoting to high-resolution models distinct from those during gameplay. The addition of the Jet-Board was inspired by Tony Hawk's Pro Skater (1999).

The music was composed by Josh Mancell and Larry Hopkins. The voice-acting was jointly recorded in the Los Angeles-based Pop Sound and the New York City-based Howard Schwartz Recording. Reprisals include Max Casella as Daxter, Warren Burton as Samos, and Anna Garduno as Keira, with Mike Erwin portraying the newly-voiced Jak. Other voices include Clancy Brown as Baron Praxis, Chris Cox as Pecker, Susan Eisenberg as Ashelin. Sherman Howard as Kor, Bill Minkin as Krew, and Cutter Garcia as Torn. Altogether, the game features 140 voice actors between seven languages.

== Release ==
Rubin confirmed Jak II's existence during a roundtable discussion at the D.I.C.E. Summit 2003. Sony Computer Entertainment officially announced the game on March 18, 2003. A playable demo was showcased at E3 2003. Sony sponsored the 2003 Summer X Games with a 77-foot PlayStation 2 truck including a Jak II kiosk. The game appeared at the 2003 Games Convention in Leipzig, Germany with the European title Jak II: Renegade. The game was released in North America on October 14, 2003, and was released in Europe the same month.

A high-definition remaster was included in the Jak and Daxter Collection for the PlayStation 3 in 2012 and PlayStation Vita in 2013. In 2017, the game became available on the PlayStation 4 as a digital download through the PlayStation Store service. Limited edition physical versions for the PlayStation 4 were released by Limited Run Games in 2019. Like its predecessor, the game was unofficially ported to PC by fans in 2023 as part of the OpenGOAL project.

== Reception ==
Reception

Aggregate score
Aggregator	Score
Metacritic	87/100

Review scores
Publication	Score
1Up.com	9/10
Electronic Gaming Monthly	8.5/10, 8.5/10, 7.5/10
EP Daily	10/10
Eurogamer	9/10
Game Informer	9.25/10
GameRevolution	A−
GameSpot	9.1/10
GameSpy	2/5
GameZone	9.7/10
IGN	9.5/10
Official U.S. PlayStation Magazine	3.5/5
PlayStation: The Official Magazine	10/10
PSM3	93%
X-Play	4/5

Awards
Publication	Award
IGN	IGN Editor's Choice 2003
GameSpot	GameSpot's Editor's Choice 2003

Jak II received "generally positive" reviews, according to review aggregator Metacritic, and won Editor's Choice from IGN and GameSpot. GameSpot named it the best PlayStation 2 game of October 2003. Kotaku's Luke Plunkett called Jak II one of the best PlayStation 2 games, highlighting the game's scale and characters. Steven Petite and Jon Bitner of Digital Trends considered Jak II to be the best in the series and one of the PlayStation 2's best platformers.

The gameplay was celebrated for its incorporation of open-world, shooting, and racing elements inspired by Grand Theft Auto, Tony Hawk's Pro Skater, and other genres. Reviewers praised the game's non-linear mission-based structure for enhancing replayability and engagement. The range of missions was described as a dynamic experience that keeps players engaged. The addition of guns was welcomed for adding depth to combat and seamlessly integrating with Jak's traditional melee moves. The Jet-Board was appreciated for its functionality, though some noted its controls lack the precision of dedicated skateboarding games. Some reviewers argued that the game's genre mashup felt derivative, borrowing heavily from other titles without fully refining each element. The city, while technically impressive, was said to lack meaningful interactivity outside missions, making exploration less rewarding than in Grand Theft Auto. Brian Gee of GameRevolution and Kristan Reed of Eurogamer respectively cited camera issues and the lack of a first-person aiming mode as additional detractions from the experience, particularly in combat-heavy sections.

The narrative was lauded for its darker, more mature tone compared to its predecessor. Reviewers highlighted the plot for its twists, complex characters, and three-way conflict between factions, with Douglass Perry of IGN assuring that players would be invested over the 15–25-hour campaign (per his estimate). Jak's newfound voice and grittier demeanor were said to add emotional depth, making him a more relatable protagonist, with Daxter's comedic relief balancing the dark tone with humor, though Perry found his antics predictable. The cutscenes were praised for their cinematic presentation, with Andrew Reiner of Game Informer describing them as elevating the narrative to a near-Hollywood level. However, Benjamin Turner of GameSpy criticized the characters as one-dimensional or overly juvenile, arguing the "edgy" tone felt forced and less believable for an adult audience.

The technical aspects were highly regarded, with the visuals in particular being said to push the PlayStation 2 to its limits with expansive environments, high polygon counts, and seamless level transitions. Critics singled out the detailed depiction of Haven City, describing its bustling crowds, dynamic day-night cycles, and intricate level design. The character animations were described as fluid and expressive, and were said to rival animated films in quality. However, Turner and GameZone's Michael Knutson noted that the darker, urban aesthetic was less vibrant than the original's colorful landscapes, with areas like the sewers appearing intentionally grimy. Occasional graphical glitches, such as noticeable level-of-detail transitions or frame rate dips, were mentioned but considered minor in the context of the game's scope. The sound design garnered praise for its robust effects and high-quality voice acting, with Jak's gritty dialogue and Daxter's quips enhancing the experience. However, the soundtrack was a point of contention, often described as functional but unmemorable; Victor Lucas of The Electric Playground remarked that Jak needed an iconic hero's theme to match the game's epic scope. The support for Dolby Pro Logic II and widescreen/progressive scan modes was said to further elevate the technical presentation.

Reactions to the difficulty were polarized, with reviewers split between admiration for its challenge and frustration at its punishing design. Missions were described as often demanding precise execution, with sparse checkpoints and relentless enemies testing players' skills. Some appreciated this intensity, noting that overcoming tough challenges delivers immense satisfaction. Others argued the difficulty felt unfair, with missions requiring multiple retries and a lack of health or ammo pickups in Haven City exacerbating the frustration. The city's navigation issues, compounded by crowded streets and floaty vehicle controls, were said to further hinder accessibility, particularly early in the game before acquiring the Jet-Board. Joe Fielder of Electronic Gaming Monthly and Gary Steinman of Official U.S. PlayStation Magazine deemed the game unsuitable for casual players, appealing more to dedicated gamers willing to endure its steep learning curve. IGN named Jak II the No. 8 hardest PlayStation 2 game, citing its combat, platforming, city navigation, and instant death scenarios. Naughty Dog developer Josh Scherr acknowledged the overwhelming difficulty in retrospect.

=== Sales and accolades ===
Jak II became Naughty Dog's fastest-selling title at the time of its release, outperforming Crash Bandicoot: Warped (1998) by over 50,000 units in the first two weeks. In its first month of release, it was the second best-selling home console video game in the United States (behind NBA Live 2004). The game underperformed in Japan as its darker tone alienated that market. Worldwide, the game sold more than 1.6 million units by April 2004.

In IGN's Game of the Year Awards, Jak II was a co-runner-up for Best Platform Game and won the award for Best Graphics. The game received six nominations at the 7th Annual Interactive Achievement Awards for Outstanding Achievement in Character Performance – Female for Anna Garduno's performance as Keira, Outstanding Achievement in Art Direction, Outstanding Achievement in Visual Engineering, Outstanding Achievement in Animation, Outstanding Achievement in Gameplay Engineering, and Console Platform Action/Adventure Game of the Year. The game was a nominee for GameSpot's "Best Platformer" and "Best PlayStation 2 Game" awards. At the 2004 Game Developers Choice Awards, the game was nominated for Excellence in Programming. In the 2003 NAVGTR Awards, the game received two nominations for Best Action Sequel and Best Dialogue.
