= Jak and Daxter =

Video game series

- Genres: Platform; Beat 'em up; Action-adventure; Third-person shooter; Racing
- Developers: Naughty Dog (2001–2005); Ready at Dawn (2006); High Impact Games (2009); Mass Media Games (2012–2013)
- Publisher: Sony Interactive Entertainment
- Creators: Andy Gavin; Jason Rubin
- Platforms: PlayStation 2; PlayStation Portable; PlayStation 3; PlayStation Vita
- First release: Jak and Daxter: The Precursor Legacy; December 4, 2001
- Latest release: Jak and Daxter Collection; February 7, 2012

Jak and Daxter is a platform video game franchise created by Andy Gavin and Jason Rubin and owned by Sony Interactive Entertainment. The series was originally developed by Naughty Dog with a number of installments being outsourced to Ready at Dawn and High Impact Games. The first game, Jak and Daxter: The Precursor Legacy, released on December 4, 2001, was one of the earliest titles for the PlayStation 2, and the series collectively is regarded as a defining franchise for the console.

The games are story-based platformers that feature a mixture of action, racing and puzzle solving. The series is set in a fictional universe that incorporates science fantasy, steampunk, cyberpunk, and mystical elements, while centering on the eponymous characters as they try to uncover the secrets of their world, and unravel the mysteries left behind by an ancient race called the Precursors. The games are inspired by a combination of Eastern and Western culture, a decision made among the team members at Naughty Dog and related stakeholders while developing the first title.

The first three games in the series were re-released on the PlayStation 3 and PlayStation Vita as part of the remastered Jak and Daxter Collection that includes support for the PlayStation Network and the PlayStation Suite. The original three Jak and Daxter games, along with Jak X: Combat Racing, were released for the PlayStation 4 as Jak and Daxter Bundle in August 2017, alongside the release of Uncharted: The Lost Legacy. In December that year, Jak and Daxter: The Precursor Legacy, Jak II, Jak 3 and Jak X: Combat Racing were also released for individual purchase. The first four games were later made available on PlayStation 5 through backward compatibility with the PlayStation 4. In 2024, the remaining two games, Daxter and Jak and Daxter: The Lost Frontier, were re-released for PlayStation 4 and PlayStation 5. The series has also produced various forms of extended media and merchandise, and has sold over 15 million copies worldwide.

== Games ==
Release timeline
2001	Jak and Daxter: The Precursor Legacy
2002
2003	Jak II
2004	Jak 3
2005	Jak X: Combat Racing
2006	Daxter
2007
2008
2009	Jak and Daxter: The Lost Frontier
2010
2011
2012	Jak and Daxter Collection

=== Main installments ===
Jak and Daxter: The Precursor Legacy was first released in North America on December 4, 2001, for the PlayStation 2. After Daxter falls into a Dark Eco silo at the forbidden Misty Island, he is transformed from a human into an ottsel, a fictional hybrid of an otter and weasel. In a quest to return Daxter to human form, he and Jak set out to find the Dark Eco sage Gol Acheron. However, the duo find Acheron corrupted by Dark Eco, choosing to use the elusive Light Eco to defeat him and save the world at the cost of Daxter remaining in his ottsel form. A browser game was published online in 2001 to promote The Precursor Legacy.

Jak II was first released in North America on October 14, 2003, for the PlayStation 2. Its narrative takes place directly after the events of The Precursor Legacy. Jak, Daxter, Samos, and Keira are thrust into the industrious Haven City after using the rift gate, with Jak being imprisoned by the Krimzon Guard upon his arrival in the city. Jak is subjected to experiments with Dark Eco and is subsequently capable of using Dark Eco powers. With the help of Daxter, Jak escapes the prison and is now in search of vengeance against the Krimzon Guard.

Jak 3 was first released in North America on November 9, 2004, for the PlayStation 2. After being blamed by the residents of Haven City for its destruction, Jak and Daxter are exiled to the Wasteland by Count Veger. Ashelin gives Jak a beacon in hopes that he'll be tracked down, with Damas, the king of nearby Spargus, rescuing him. In exchange, Jak and Daxter must now prove their worth to Damas and the city or risk being banished and thrown back into the desert.

=== Other games ===
Jak X: Combat Racing was first released in North America on October 18, 2005, for the PlayStation 2. Its narrative takes place following the events of Jak 3, with Jak and his allies inadvertently being poisoned while attending the reading of Krew's last will. Jak and his allies must partake and win the Kras City Grand Championship, a championship of the fictional sport of "combat racing", in Krew's name in order to obtain an antidote for the poison.

Daxter was first released in North America on March 14, 2006, for the PlayStation Portable. The game primarily focuses on Daxter, taking place during the two-year gap introduced in the opening of Jak II. Daxter is now employed as a pest exterminator by the Kridder Ridder company, in which he works to mitigate the incoming metal bug invasion. Alongside this work, Daxter is on a quest to find and free Jak from his imprisonment by the Krimzon Guard.

Jak and Daxter: The Lost Frontier was first released in North America on November 3, 2009, for the PlayStation 2 and PlayStation Portable. Its narrative takes place an undisclosed amount of time after the events of the original trilogy. When their world begins to run low on Eco, Jak, Daxter, and Keira travel to the Brink, the edge of the world, in search of ancient Precursor machinery that can reverse this decline of Eco.

=== Collections and remasters ===
Jak and Daxter Collection was first released in North America on February 7, 2012, for the PlayStation 3—the franchise's first appearance on the platform. It is a remastered port of the original trilogy—Jak and Daxter: The Precursor Legacy, Jak II, and Jak 3. The games were ported by Mass Media Games and feature 720p graphics at 60 frames per second and trophies. Mass Media Games later ported the collection to the PlayStation Vita and it was released in June 2013—the franchise's only appearance on this platform.

Jak and Daxter Bundle was first released in North America on December 7, 2017, for the PlayStation 4—the franchise's first appearance on the platform. The bundle features emulations of Jak and Daxter: The Precursor Legacy, Jak II, Jak 3, and Jak X: Combat Racing, in addition to retaining trophy support. Prior to the release of the bundle, The Precursor Legacy was released on the PlayStation 4 as a pre-order bonus for Uncharted: The Lost Legacy. Between 2019 and 2020, Limited Run Games released a limited amount of physical copies of both standard and collector's editions of the games.

== Gameplay and common elements ==
=== Mechanics ===
The series consists of four single-player-only games, and two that include multiplayer. The series is primarily a story-based platformer presented in the third-person perspective. The player can explore a multitude of different areas in an open world environment and can perform several melee attacks. A substance called Eco can also be manipulated to enhance the player's abilities, with differently-colored Eco having different effects. Red Eco enhances the damage dealt and yields one impervious to damage from Dark Eco crates. Blue Eco allows the player to move faster, jump slightly higher, move slightly farther using attacks, attract Green Eco and Precursor orbs, and operate certain color coded machines. Green Eco is used to restore health, while Yellow Eco allows the player to shoot fire from the character's hands, which can be done "from the hip," or using a scope. A hover bike called a "Zoomer" and a large bird known as a "Flut-Flut" are also available for transportation and to gain access to hard-to-reach places. "Flut-Flut" also has the ability to attack. Power Cells and Precursor Orbs are required to advance the story in The Precursor Legacy, while completing story-related missions and collecting Precursor Orbs unlocks new locations and allows the player to unlock certain "Secrets" in all subsequent entries.

Shooting elements are briefly introduced in The Precursor Legacy, becoming fully implemented in Jak II. Jak II features customizable weapons and other varied forms of combat, expanding upon features present in The Precursor Legacy. For example, Jak has many different gun mods. Each one is a certain color, either Red, Blue, Yellow, or Dark. Red gun mods make the gun similar to a shotgun. Blue lets it fire as a machine gun. Yellow mods are for long-range shooting, and Dark mods are for utmost power. Daxter is also a playable character and features in several Crash Bandicoot-esque missions. Dark Eco powers also become available, which is countered by the introduction of Light Eco powers in Jak 3. Guns can be upgraded twice through accomplishing certain story missions, and several abilities to use in both Light and Dark Jak forms are unlocked as well. Driving becomes a core ingredient and is further expanded upon in Jak 3. In The Lost Frontier aerial combat is integrated into the series. Precursor orbs can be collected in each game to unlock cheats.

Jak X deviates from the series' more traditional style of gameplay, adapting into the racing genre, and is based on the driving mechanics developed for Jak 3. Several extras can be unlocked for Jak X and Daxter by linking up the save files from the two respective games, and several player skins can be unlocked if the player has save files from The Precursor Legacy, Jak II, Jak 3 and Insomniac Games' Ratchet: Deadlocked.

With the exception of The Precursor Legacy, each installment offers "Hero Mode", which allows a player to replay the game at a higher level of difficulty with all or most of their previous acquisitions. This mode, in addition to other bonus content, can be unlocked by finishing the game and purchasing said content in the secrets menu with Precursor Orbs.

=== Setting and characters ===
Render of the series' titular protagonists from PlayStation All-Stars Battle Royale

Jak and Daxter is set in a fictional universe. The first game takes place in a world brimming with various natural environments that are encompassed by village settlements, and ancient Precursor ruins and elements can be found riddled throughout the landscape. An elemental substance called Eco is prominent throughout the game and is considered the world's life source. Eco comes in several forms, Red Eco, Blue Eco, Yellow Eco, Green Eco, Light Eco and Dark Eco, each with different prospective effects. Subsequent entries/games are set in a future setting that has witnessed large advancements in both society and technology, mainly taking place in cities and other larger settlements and affecting both hand-to-hand combat and available weaponry. Beyond cities in subsequent games lies natural environments with many platforming segments, akin to the first game. Overall, there are many distinct and differing environments available to discover and explore. All three main titles take place in an open world with little to no load times—a goal emphasized heavily since the first game.

The Jak and Daxter universe is populated primarily by a humanoid elfish species. Jak is the main protagonist of the series, and is playable in every game with the exception of Daxter. In The Precursor Legacy, he accidentally turned Daxter from a human into an ottsel (a fictional hybrid of an otter and weasel) after accidentally bumping him into a reservoir of Dark Eco and sets out on a quest in attempts to undo the transformation. In Jak II, he is infused with Dark Eco due to experimentations performed by Baron Praxis, and in Jak 3 he is blessed with Light Eco by the Precursors. Both Light and Dark Eco abilities are expanded upon during the course of the story in Jak 3. In Jak X, he is forced to race in the Kras City Grand Championship in order to save his life. He later travels to The Brink to investigate the Eco shortage that is ravaging his world in The Lost Frontier.

Daxter is Jak's sidekick, and is often found getting into trouble. Daxter was once a human but fell into a pit of Dark Eco in the opening cutscene of the first game in the series, which mutated him into an ottsel. He rescues Jak at the beginning of Jak II, and becomes playable intermittently for the first time in the series. In Jak 3 his role is expanded, and he gets a pair of pants as a reward for his efforts as an ongoing gag in the game. In Daxter, he details his adventures in the two-year time span before he managed to break Jak out of prison. In Jak X, he accompanies Jak and his friends to Kras City, and assists them as they compete in the Kras City Grand Championship. He later travels with Jak and Keira to The Brink in The Lost Frontier.

== Development ==
=== Main series ===
Naughty Dog began work on a new game shortly after the release of the sixth generation of consoles. Only two programmers were originally allocated to the project, as the rest of the department was still developing Crash Team Racing. They began by building a new graphics engine that would be capable of rendering a seamlessly connected, open world environment. They then developed a fully articulated character to examine the engine's efficiency, before presenting the idea to Sony Computer Entertainment following the completion of Crash Team Racing. The aim of their new title was to break away from the linear approach taken in the Crash Bandicoot series, with minimal story and character development, and individually loaded levels. In a behind-the-scenes special by Naughty Dog it was revealed that a new blend animation had been utilised for the game, allowing for a smoother frame rate and animation process. The engine for Jak and Daxter was created from the ground up specifically for the game. Unusually for most games, Naughty Dog invented a new programming language, GOAL, which was only ever used for the Jak and Daxter series.

Jak and Daxter: The Precursor Legacy was revealed at E3 in June 2001. The game had a budget of $14 million and a development cycle that lasted nearly three years. At that time, they managed to create a fully interactive world and conceived a narrative that would allow for more meaningful character development. The two central characters also went through a rigid design process that took inspiration from both manga and Disney animation. They had initially planned on introducing a third character who would evolve as the game progressed in a Tamogotchi-style fashion. However, this idea was scrapped as it led to several unnecessary complications. The game's soundtrack was recorded at Mutato Muzika Studios, and was produced by Mark Mothersbaugh with Josh Mancell composing the score.

=== Side games ===
Following the release of the PlayStation Portable, Naughty Dog took interest in developing a new Jak and Daxter title for the system. Producer Sam Thompson helmed the production of the game, while Neil Druckmann was responsible for much of the design. The team ultimately produced a tech demo, and had plans to allow players the ability to "create your own airships and cobble together all these things with these different stat bonuses and actually have meaningful engagements in the air". However, Evan Wells revealed that they were unable to sustain the game's development alongside Uncharted: Drake's Fortune and made the decision to pass the project onto High Impact Games, ultimately being fleshed out as Jak and Daxter: The Lost Frontier. Following the lackluster success of the game, Thompson expressed the company's disappointment with the execution of The Lost Frontier, commenting "I'm not happy with that being Jak's swan song. I think we could have done a lot better".

== Audio ==
Five Jak and Daxter soundtracks have been commercially released and have featured several composers, including Mark Mothersbaugh, Josh Mancell, Larry Hopkins, Billy Howerdel, and James Dooley. The compositions were inspired by world music, with Mancell commenting that he intended "to create something other than an expected orchestral flavoured fantasy soundtrack. I ended up using a lot of non-Western instruments and traditional, Western orchestral instruments such as the French Horn and Cello. Additionally, I feel the Jak games have both an ancient and futuristic vibe about them — I wanted the music to evoke both qualities." The soundtracks for Jak and Daxter: The Precursor Legacy, Jak II, Jak 3, and Jak X: Combat Racing were all commercially released in 2019 by Limited Run Games as part of the Collector's Edition of each respective game.

On November 2, 2009, Jak and Daxter: The Lost Frontier Original Soundtrack was released on the iTunes Store by SIE.

== Reception ==
Aggregate review scores
Game	Metacritic
Jak and Daxter: The Precursor Legacy	90/100
Jak II	87/100
Jak 3	84/100
Jak X: Combat Racing	76/100
Daxter	85/100
Jak and Daxter: The Lost Frontier	71/100 (PSP); 72/100 (PS2)
Jak and Daxter Collection	81/100 (PS3); 67/100 (VITA)

With physical and digital copies combined, the Jak and Daxter franchise has sold over 15 million games worldwide (as of April 2017). Jak and Daxter: The Precursor Legacy received critical acclaim from several reviewers as compiled by review aggregator Metacritic, with the game having the highest score in the franchise at 90/100. Jak II, Jak 3, Daxter, and Jak and Daxter Collection (PS3) all received generally favorable reception, while Jak X: Combat Racing only received mixed reception. The Lost Frontier also only had mixed reception and, not including the PlayStation Vita port of Jak and Daxter Collection, it has the lowest score in the series from Metacritic (71/100).

The series has received critical acclaim for its innovation in the platform genre. The series holds seven records in the Guinness World Records Gamer's Edition, 2008, with The Precursor Legacy holding a record for including the First Seamless 3D World in a Console Game. Jack DeVries of IGN referred to the series as "the best action platformers of [that] generation," praising the "huge worlds, memorable characters, action packed stories, and great gameplay". Jeffrey Matulef of Eurogamer stated that "the Jak and Daxter series may not be as solid a platformer as Sly Cooper and its gunplay isn't as refined as Ratchet & Clank's – but in terms of ambition, invention and grandiosity, it remains leagues above its last-gen platforming brethren".

The series has also received praise for its diverse gameplay styles. Matt Helgeson of Game Informer noted that the "series was driven by a restless sense of innovation," praising "Naughty Dog's work in this franchise [for creating] great characters, finely tuned gameplay, and a unceasing inventiveness". Helgeson also declared that the Jak games "stand up as epic adventures". Matulef further stated that "the Jak and Daxter series remains a fascinating document of the evolution of the action adventure; its heroes are unstuck in time, without a genre to call home. No series has been so willing to switch gameplay styles with such reckless abandon, and The Jak and Daxter Trilogy represents a shining example of what happens when a capable developer takes a huge risk." GameSpot stated that the franchise's "tight execution and heavy action elements ensure that things never become dull," adding that the franchise "manages to provide a rewarding gameplay experience that shouldn't be missed".

== Merchandise ==
Naughty Dog have released various forms of merchandise since the series' inception. These include strategy guides for each game, several forms of clothing and collectible figures. A limited edition Precursor orb was also released to celebrate the series' 10th anniversary.

== Other appearances ==
The Jak and Daxter series has been featured in a variety of other media.

- In LittleBigPlanet, LittleBigPlanet 2 and LittleBigPlanet Karting, a Jak costume and a Daxter costume are available for Sackboy through bonus add-ons.
- In the 2011 PlayStation Move game PlayStation Move Heroes, Jak and Daxter appear as playable characters, along with an environment based on Haven City.
- Jak and Daxter appeared as playable characters in the PlayStation 3 and PlayStation Vita title PlayStation All-Stars Battle Royale.
- In Ratchet: Deadlocked, Jak appears as an alternate skin for Ratchet.
- In Sly Cooper: Thieves in Time, Daxter appears wearing a leopard loincloth as a museum treasure. Its description reads "The Lutrela Nivadensis is a rare hybrid species of the Carnivora family. It is known for its orange fur and loud mouth."
- A "Strange Relic" can be discovered in multiple games in the Uncharted series, another game series developed by Naughty Dog. It is a copy of the Precursor Orbs found in the Jak and Daxter universe, and when translated reads "NaughtyDog, Madman."
- Jak appears alongside Ratchet as a playable character in Hot Shots Golf Fore! and Daxter acts as a golf caddy.
- Jak and Daxter appear on posters in various games in the Ratchet & Clank universe.
- Jak and Daxter appear in several background cameos in Ratchet & Clank: Going Commando.
- Daxter is referenced in Uncharted: Drake's Fortune, with "Ottsel" written across Nathan Drake's swimsuit, and a picture of Daxter's face on the sleeve.
- Daxter is featured as a free downloadable character in the PlayStation 3 game Pain.
- In Uncharted 3: Drake's Deception, a pair of Jak Goggles can be purchased from the PlayStation Store for use in multiplayer.
- In The Last of Us, Jak and Daxter make several cameos in the form of easter eggs and unlockable outfits.
- In The Order: 1886, Daxter appears in the form of an easter egg. The game is developed by Ready at Dawn.
- In The Last of Us Part II, Jak and Daxter make several cameos in the form of easter eggs.
- In Ratchet & Clank: Rift Apart, Jak and Daxter as well as Precursor Orb can be brought into Ratchet and Clank's dimension by using the new RYNO 8 weapon. The dimension from which Jak and Daxter originate is named Dimension 31x7 according to a character named Mags.

== Future ==
Evan Wells revealed that they had explored the idea of making a new game extensively before the development began on The Last of Us (2013). Creative director Neil Druckmann later unveiled several illustrations for the abandoned game at a conference for The Last of Us. He explained that they had planned on making a reboot of the series and had spent a long time exploring various concepts.

In response to an alleged concept art leak in 2016, Naughty Dog's Director of Communication Arne Meyer stated that nothing was currently being worked on. Also, due to circumstances at Naughty Dog, Jak and Daxter has not yet been reconsidered, but was never off the table.

In 2019, Limited Run Games announced a commemorative mock case for the unreleased Jak and Daxter reboot, which was released in June 2020. The mock case uses the title Jak IV and features concept art from the scrapped reboot that was revealed in Naughty Dog's coffee table book, The Art of Naughty Dog. The case, in addition to a digital theme code, was given to consumers who purchased all four Jak and Daxter titles directly from the Limited Run Games website.

== Planned film adaptation ==
In February 2022, director Ruben Fleischer teased the possibility of working on a Jak and Daxter film adaptation with PlayStation Productions. Neil Widener and Gavin James could possibly write a screenplay.
