= Jak and Daxter Collection =

2012 video game

- North American PlayStation 3 box art
- Developer: Mass Media
- Publisher: Sony Computer Entertainment
- Series: Jak and Daxter
- Platforms: PlayStation 3, PlayStation Vita
- Release: PlayStation 3: NA: February 7, 2012; EU: February 22, 2012; AU: March 8, 2012; PlayStation Vita: NA: June 18, 2013; AU: June 19, 2013; EU: June 21, 2013
- Genre: Platform
- Mode: Single-player

Jak and Daxter Collection (known in the PAL region as The Jak and Daxter Trilogy) is a 2012 video game compilation developed by Mass Media and published by Sony Computer Entertainment for the PlayStation 3. It is a collection of remastered ports of the first three games in Naughty Dog's Jak and Daxter series. A port to the PlayStation Vita was released in 2013.

== Development ==
In July 2011, Naughty Dog's co-president Evan Wells stated in an interview with Game Informer that they would "love" to return to the series, but said they were currently "focusing" on Uncharted 3. Wells revealed in a later interview that they had explored the idea of a new game in the series "fairly extensively" before development began on The Last of Us. Neil Druckmann elaborated further in an interview for The Last of Us. He said they had planned on making a reboot of the series, and had spent a long time searching for ideas and concepts they would get excited by, but discover that "the ideas we were getting passionate about were getting away from what Jak and Daxter was." They later hinted, however, that a "dark, dirty and dangerous" collection was in the works.

In October 2011, according to Digital Spy, an online business in South Africa known as BT Games had a Jak and Daxter Collection listed for release in January 2012. Justin Richmond apparently also confirmed that a Jak and Daxter Collection was set to be released in January 2012, according to Video Games 24/7. Sony then revealed that the Jak and Daxter Collection would be released on the PlayStation 3 in February 2012, and on the PlayStation Vita in June 2013.

The PS3 version supports a 720p resolution and usually has a fixed frame rate of 60 frames per second, with the Vita version running with an unlocked framerate of around 30. The stereoscopic 3D mode on PS3 runs at 30 frames per second. The game has additional features for the PlayStation Network which includes support for the trophy system.

== Reception ==
Reception

Aggregate score
Aggregator	Score
Metacritic	(PS3) 81/100 (VITA) 67/100

Review scores
Publication	Score
Destructoid	9/10
Eurogamer	8/10
Game Informer	9.3/10
IGN	9/10

The Jak and Daxter Collection was met with positive reviews from critics, who highlighted the overall graphical transformation, and noted: "Though some aspects of the games are dated now, the Jak games still stand up as epic adventures."

Eurogamer offered praise for "three of the most interesting platformers of the 21st century." They maintained that they "may not be as solid a platformer as Sly Cooper and its gunplay isn't as refined as Ratchet & Clank's – but in terms of ambition, invention and grandiosity, it remains leagues above its last-gen platforming brethren." They regarded the games as a "fascinating document of the evolution of the action adventure; its heroes are unstuck in time, without a genre to call home. No series has been so willing to switch gameplay styles with such reckless abandon", and concluded "the Jak represents a shining example of what happens when a capable developer takes a huge risk."

Game Informer "the series was driven by a restless sense of innovation", praising "Naughty Dog's work in this franchise for creating great characters, finely tuned gameplay, and a unceasing inventiveness", and felt "the Jak games stand up as epic adventures."
