= Jak and Daxter: The Precursor Legacy =

2001 video game

- North American cover art
- Developer: Naughty Dog
- Publisher: Sony Computer Entertainment
- Director: Jason Rubin
- Designer: Evan Wells
- Programmers: Andy Gavin; Stephen White; Mark Cerny
- Artists: Bob Rafei; Charles Zembillas
- Composer: Josh Mancell
- Series: Jak and Daxter
- Platform: PlayStation 2
- Release: NA: December 4, 2001; EU: December 2001
- Genre: Platform
- Mode: Single-player

Jak and Daxter: The Precursor Legacy is a 2001 platform video game developed by Naughty Dog and published by Sony Computer Entertainment for the PlayStation 2 (PS2). The player controls Jak, who sets out to reverse the transformation of his friend Daxter into an "ottsel", a fictional hybrid of an otter and a weasel. This quest eventually turns into an effort to stop a rogue sage from corrupting the world. The game takes place in a cohesive and non-linear world, allowing the player to freely explore interconnected areas.

The game was conceived during development of Crash Team Racing (1999), Naughty Dog's final Crash Bandicoot game. Pursuing a new intellectual property, the company envisioned a seamless 3D action-adventure that leveraged the PS2's capabilities. The development team built a new engine using Game Oriented Assembly Lisp (GOAL), a custom language for real-time code changes, and recruited animators from Disney and Nickelodeon. Naughty Dog was acquired by Sony during production, providing financial stability. Public anticipation for the game was high prior to its unveiling at E3 2001, where its title was revealed.

Jak and Daxter: The Precursor Legacy was critically acclaimed upon release. Reviewers lauded the game's visuals and technical achievements, particularly its open seamless world devoid of load times, which were said to set a new standard for platformers. Praise also went to its gameplay polish, controls, sound effects, and voice acting. Reactions to the music and difficulty were mixed, and criticisms were directed toward the gameplay's lack of innovation, lack of bosses, simplistic story, and short length. By 2002, the game had sold over one million copies worldwide, and by 2007, it had sold two million copies in the United States alone. It is the first installment in the Jak and Daxter series, with the first sequel, Jak II, being released in 2003. A remastered version was released as part of the Jak and Daxter Collection in 2012, and a limited edition physical version for the PlayStation 4 was released by Limited Run Games in 2019.

== Gameplay ==
Jak and Daxter, powered with Blue Eco, have activated a platform to reach the Power Cell sitting on top of the leftward tower. The game's considerable draw distance allows faraway locations to be seen from high vantage points.

Jak and Daxter: The Precursor Legacy is an open world 3D platformer with elements of action-adventure. The player controls Jak, who must collect Power Cells to progress through the game's world and ultimately reach the sage Gol in the hope of reversing his friend Daxter's transformation into an ottsel (a fictitious crossbreed between an otter and a weasel). The game's world is cohesive and non-linear, allowing free exploration across interconnected areas.

Jak's basic actions include running, jumping, double-jumping, crouching, and ledge-grabbing. Jak can also perform a rolling jump to reach distant platforms. Jak's combat moves include a spin attack, a dash-punch, a dive attack, and an uppercut. Jak has unlimited lives and three hit points, which are depleted by enemy attacks or contact with environmental hazards. Losing all three hit points triggers a death animation and a comment from Daxter before the player respawns in the beginning of the last section of the area they were located in. Scattered throughout each area is a magical and powerful substance known as "Eco", which comes in a variety of colors and affects Jak or the environment in special ways. Green Eco restores health; Blue Eco boosts speed, activates platforms, and attracts items; Red Eco increases attack power and range; and Yellow Eco enables fireball attacks to defeat enemies or break obstacles. In some sections, Jak pilots an A-GraV Zoomer, a hovercraft that can traverse land and water, and rides a Flut Flut bird to reach high or distant areas.

Power Cells, the game's primary collectible, are earned by completing tasks, defeating bosses, or finding them in the environment. Power Cells power the A-GraV Zoomer, which is used to traverse long passes that link certain areas together. Precursor Orbs are the setting's currency and can be traded for Power Cells with villagers or Precursor statues. Each area includes seven Scout Flies, and a Power Cell is rewarded when all Scout Flies in an area are collected. Some of the various missions that reward Power Cells include platforming challenges (such as reaching a high structure), minigames (such as fishing), races, and fetch quests. The player's actions in completing tasks have persistent effects, and do not reset upon departing mid-task.

== Plot ==
Samos, the Green Sage and master of Green Eco, has long attempted to uncover the mysteries of the Precursors, an ancient civilization responsible for creating monoliths and harnessing Eco, the world's life energy. He believes the answers to these mysteries lie with Jak, a boy unaware of his destiny and initially uninterested in Samos's guidance. Defying Samos's warnings, Jak and his friend Daxter embark on an adventure to Misty Island. There, they overhear two mysterious figures instructing a group of primate-like Lurkers to search for Precursor artifacts and Eco while planning an attack on a nearby village. Jak and Daxter discover a pit of Dark Eco, a dangerous substance. Daxter accidentally falls into it after a confrontation with a Lurker, transforming him into an ottsel, a small, furry creature. Jak and Daxter return to Samos, who reveals that only Gol Acheron, a Sage who has studied Dark Eco extensively, might reverse Daxter's transformation. However, Gol resides far to the north, and the journey requires passing through the treacherous Fire Canyon. Keira, Samos's daughter, offers to lend her heat shielded A-GraV Zoomer, which requires Power Cells to withstand the canyon's heat.

While collecting Power Cells, Jak and Daxter prevent the Lurkers from breaching a Dark Eco silo on Misty Island. This attracts the attention of the two figures, who plot to thwart them, and they unleash a giant Lurker named Klaww in Rock Village. Jak and Daxter gather enough Power Cells to fuel the Zoomer's heat shield, allowing them to cross Fire Canyon and reach Rock Village. There, they find the Blue Sage's lab in disarray and learn that the village is being bombarded by flaming boulders. They collect more Power Cells to activate a levitation machine to remove a massive boulder blocking the path to Klaww, whom they defeat. Continuing their journey through the Mountain Pass and reaching the Volcanic Crater, they discover the Red Sage's lab in chaos, evidently from a struggle. Gol and his sister Maia, the two figures from Misty Island, reveal themselves, having been corrupted by Dark Eco. They have kidnapped the other Sages to harness their powers and open Dark Eco silos to reshape the world. They boast of controlling Dark Eco, a feat even the Precursors could not achieve, and plan to use a Precursor Robot to access vast underground Dark Eco reserves. Samos knows that if they open the reserves, the Dark Eco will twist and destroy everything it touches.

As Jak and Daxter take the Zoomer to Gol and Maia's citadel, Samos is also captured, prompting the pair to storm the citadel. They free the four Sages, who combine their Eco powers to disable a force shield protecting the Precursor Robot. Jak and Daxter confront Gol and Maia, who use the robot to open a Dark Eco silo. During the battle, the Sages' Eco powers merge into Light Eco, a rare and powerful substance. Daxter, despite hoping Light Eco could restore his form, chooses to let Jak use it to destroy the robot. Jak's powerful Light Eco blast obliterates the robot, and Gol and Maia are destroyed when their cockpit falls into the Dark Eco and the silo closes. In the aftermath, Samos praises Jak and Daxter as heroes, though Daxter remains an ottsel, as Gol's help is lost. The group discovers a massive Precursor Door requiring 100 Power Cells to open. If Jak and Daxter have collected all 100, the door opens, revealing a dazzling light that leaves the group in awe.

== Development ==
=== Conceptualization and initial development ===
The project that would become Jak and Daxter began in 1998, during the development of Crash Team Racing (CTR), the final Crash Bandicoot game by Naughty Dog. Disenchanted with their lack of control over the Crash Bandicoot intellectual property (owned by Universal Interactive) and feeling creatively exhausted by the series, co-founders Jason Rubin and Andy Gavin decided to pursue a new project. Their vision was to create an open world, seamless 3D action-adventure game that combined the platforming elements of Banjo-Kazooie, the epic storytelling of The Legend of Zelda, and the "do-or-die excitement" of Crash Bandicoot. The hardware limitations of the PlayStation constrained Naughty Dog's earlier attempts at open world gameplay, and thus the anticipated power of the PlayStation 2 (PS2) fueled their ambition.

Initial development focused on building a new game engine, with Gavin and a small team of programmers, including Stephen White, starting work in January 1999 under the codename "Project Y"; the title was a progression from CTR's early working title "Project X". Their first year of work coincided with CTR's development, granting the rest of the team an engine and tools to work with upon CTR's completion. The team aimed to create a single, cohesive world without loading screens, a goal inspired by the limitations of Crash Bandicoot's discrete levels and the success of games like Super Mario 64 (1996) and Spyro the Dragon (1998). The engine development included creating a proprietary programming language called Game Oriented Assembly Lisp (GOAL), designed to streamline development by allowing real-time code modifications, significantly reducing iteration times compared to the Crash series.

By January 2000, with CTR completed, Naughty Dog expanded the Jak and Daxter team to 36 members, more than doubling the size of the CTR team. The studio's biggest growth was in the animation department, which grew to include six full-time animators and four additional support staff, many recruited from outside the gaming industry, including Disney and Nickelodeon. By Rubin's estimate, Jak and Daxter involved over three times the manpower effort of the largest Crash game. Additional game design and programming was provided by Mark Cerny via his independent consultancy Cerny Games.

During development, Rubin and Gavin sold Naughty Dog to Sony in early 2001 for an undisclosed sum, influenced by their frustration over their lack of control over Crash Bandicoot and the financial burdens of independent development. The acquisition, prompted by discussions with Sony executives, secured financial stability and allowed Naughty Dog to focus on creative risks without the pressure of self-funding. Jak and Daxter was developed on a $14 million budget, with Rubin and Gavin personally contributing $2.25 million each. Sony's trust in Naughty Dog, built on the studio's track record of delivering four successful Crash games on schedule, allowed substantial creative freedom.

=== Art design ===
Early designs for Jak included animal-like features before his final elfin appearance was reached. The designs on top are by Charles Zembillas, while the designs on the bottom are by Bob Rafei.

Early concepts for the game included a third main character, a pet-like creature intended to evolve based on player actions, similar to a Tamagotchi, but this idea was abandoned to focus on two core characters: Jak, a silent, athletic hero, and Daxter, his comedic sidekick. Crash Bandicoot character designer Charles Zembillas was a key character designer for Jak and Daxter. He was initially respected at Naughty Dog, given a private workspace to create designs for Jak and Daxter that were "unclouded by outside thoughts". This required a year-long process and 650 concepts due to the PS2's higher polygon limits, allowing for detailed designs that Zembillas compared to sculptures. Jak's design went through multiple iterations, initially exploring animal-like features (which co-designer Evan Wells compared to ThunderCats) and ponytails to exploit chain physics, before settling on a long-eared, elfin appearance. Daxter was inspired by Mushu from Mulan (1998) and designed as a loquacious ottsel (an otter-weasel hybrid) to provide humor and commentary, complementing Jak's mute protagonist role. The character design drew from a blend of Western and Eastern aesthetic influences, including Joe Madureira's Battle Chasers and Hayao Miyazaki's Nausicaä of the Valley of the Wind (1984) and Princess Mononoke (1997), while the idyllic village setting, character interactions and quest setup were influenced by Asterix. Animator John Kim based Jak and Daxter's movements on Aladdin and Abu from Disney's Aladdin (1992).

The game's world was designed to be cohesive and immersive, with levels interconnected to allow seamless transitions and visible landmarks across areas, such as the view of multiple locations from the top of the Forbidden Temple. This required meticulous level design to manage memory spooling and hide loading processes, a task complicated by the need to maintain spatial logic (e.g., ensuring caves fit realistically within mountains). The environments drew inspiration from Japanese landscapes, with the development team collecting several photographic reference books.

Art director Bob Rafei pointed to Star Wars, Disney, and Studio Ghibli as key touchstones during the story's conceptualization phase. The story was made to be more ambitious than those of Crash Bandicoot, with a mythos connected to the game's world. As the team wanted to incorporate "Disney-quality" animated cutscenes to deliver this story, over 50 minutes of real-time cutscenes, rendered in-engine, were created. The animation team produced approximately 30 seconds of finished animation per week, a pace comparable to feature films, despite some delays in voice recordings. Some levels were entirely redesigned to accommodate frustrated focus testers.

To Zembillas' frustration, he was credited for "additional character design", which he felt downplayed the extent of his contributions. After the game's launch, he sent an angry email to Naughty Dog staff warning them to avoid him in person. As a result of this credit, Zembillas was not recognized in the nomination of Daxter for "Original Game Character of the Year" in the Game Developers Choice Awards, nor was he mentioned in Naughty Dog's acceptance speech. Zembillas insisted Daxter was wholly his creation, as he worked in isolation and produced numerous iterations, though he distanced himself from Jak's "Dragon Ball Z haircut", calling it derivative, and noted that Jak II's design tweaks aligned more with his original vision.

=== Technical challenges and innovations ===
Wells described the design challenges faced by the development team as "non-stop", and White said that the project at times seemed like an "insurmountable uphill battle". Gavin noted that the PS2's architecture was difficult to program for, especially in the absence of working examples or libraries. Naughty Dog secured an early PS2 devkit in 1999, smuggled into the United States due to export restrictions, allowing the team to begin engine development despite incomplete hardware and firmware.

The game engine, comprising approximately nine specialized renderers, was rewritten multiple times to optimize performance in order to achieve a consistent 60 frames per second with no pop-up or draw-in issues. A proprietary mesh tessellation and reduction scheme that was initially developed for CTR was radically enhanced for Jak and Daxter, allowing distant objects to use simplified models to manage polygon counts efficiently; for example, an object resembling a smooth sphere up close would be reduced to a cube at a 200-yard distance. The team also developed a new camera system to navigate the game, addressing motion sickness that was observed in focus tests for Spyro and Banjo-Kazooie. The camera used automatic and optional manual control so it could be used without player intervention.

The development of GOAL, led solely by Gavin, created bottlenecks in support, bug fixes, feature enhancements, and optimizations, as only he fully understood the program. The language's real-time code execution and cooperative multitasking capabilities were powerful but introduced slow garbage collection, which could halt development for up to 15 minutes. Additionally, the team struggled with Maya, which could not handle the game's massive geometry, requiring the artists to build using proxies and references. Custom plug-ins were developed, but their text-based interfaces were cumbersome. Eventually, one of the artists created menus and visualization aids that significantly improved productivity.

=== Audio and localization ===
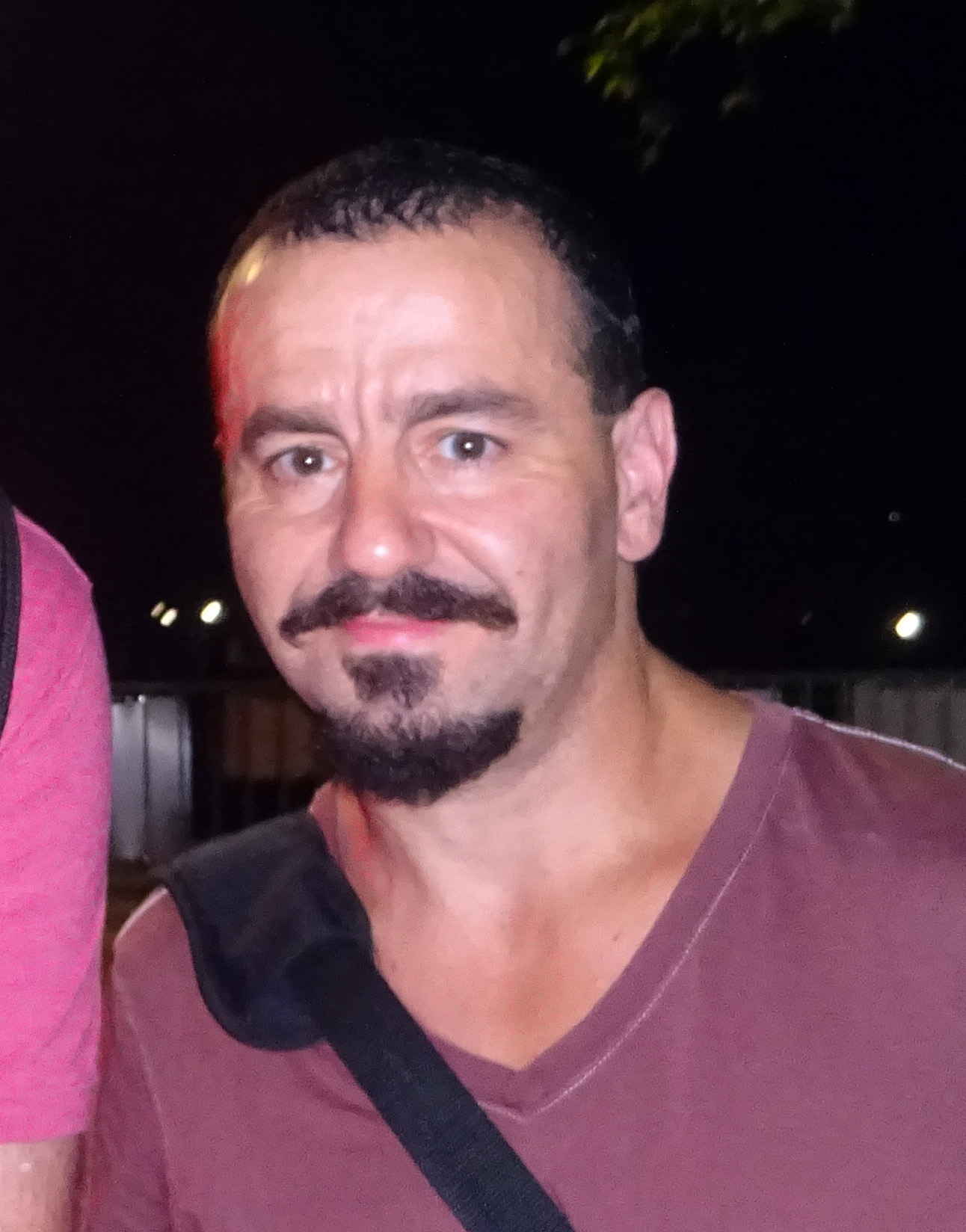
Casella in 2016

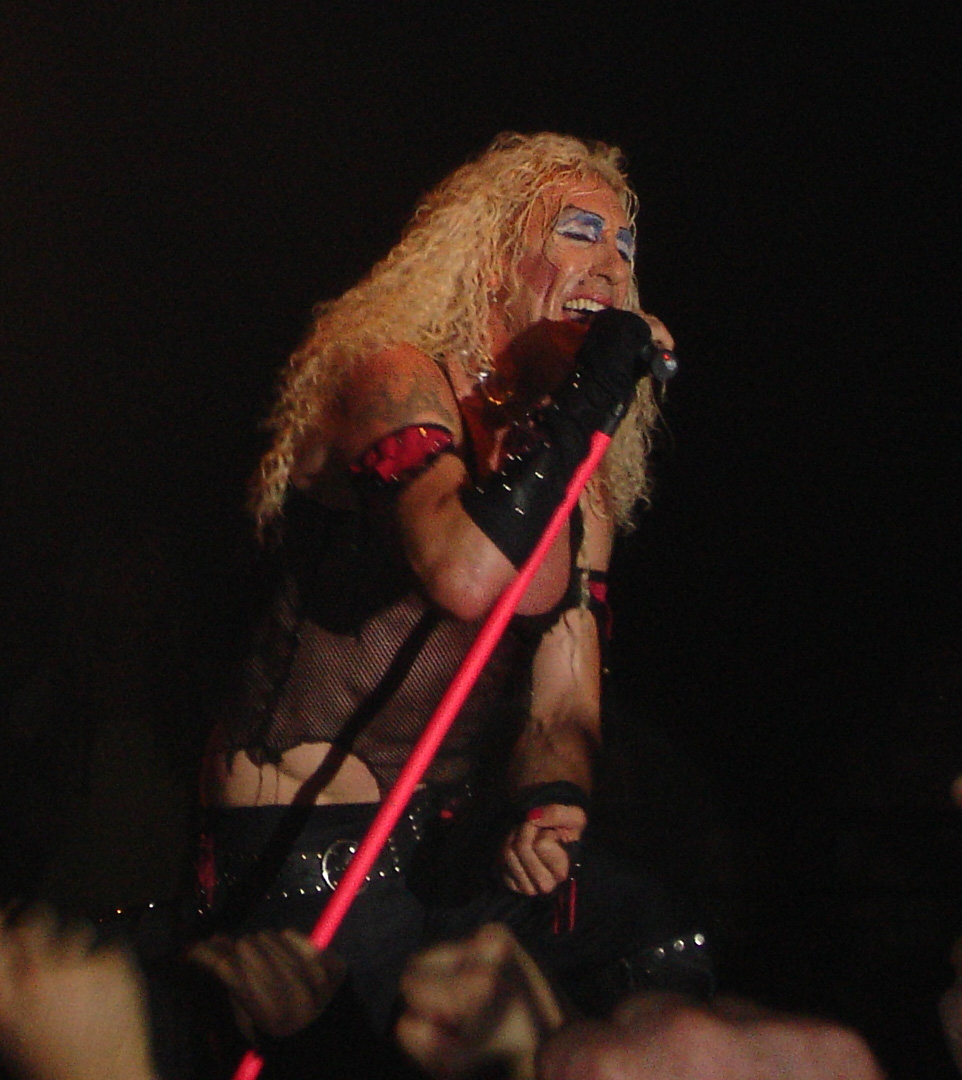
Snider in 2006

Max Casella (left) and Dee Snider (right) respectively voiced Daxter and Gol.

The soundtrack was composed by Josh Mancell and produced by Mark Mothersbaugh, while the voice acting was recorded in the New York City-based Howard Schwartz Recording facility. The game was recorded in six languages, employing a total of 126 voice actors, including Max Casella as Daxter and Twisted Sister's lead vocalist Dee Snider as Gol. Jak's silence was driven by Rubin's belief that a silent protagonist would keep players fully immersed with the character and avoid the risk of alienating players with unwanted character traits, citing Gex as his prime example. In hindsight, Wells and programmer Greg Omi questioned the decision to keep Jak silent, and suggested that giving Jak lines could have fueled banter between him and Daxter.

The game's original sound programmer quit and moved to Australia early in development, and the studio did not hire a replacement, resulting in a problematic audio production. The sound effects were numerous and difficult to balance, while the spooled Foley effects suffered from synchronization issues due to their late implementation. White felt the music lacked the cohesive direction of previous Crash games, which he attributed to the lack of a music director. The NTSC and PAL versions of the game were developed simultaneously. The team carefully structured the game code and data to enable localization to a particular territory with swappable data files. They also used standardized timing units to ensure consistent physics and animation playback across regions. Insufficient testing and the team's lack of knowledge of the various languages led to undetected errors.

== Marketing and release ==
Even before the game's announcement at E3 2001, "Project Y" was highly anticipated. The game's title was revealed on May 14, and the game was revealed at E3 2001 two days later, with a scheduled winter 2001 release. As development neared completion, Naughty Dog faced intense pressure to meet deadlines; the subsequent six months following the E3 showcase were a "blur" of script rewrites, engine overhauls, and level building. The final boss was integrated just 48 hours before submission. To ensure the game met Naughty Dog's quality standards, it was delayed one month past Thanksgiving 2001 for polishing.

In November, a game demo and coupon for the game's retail copy was distributed to Cingular Wireless customers who activated service with an Ericsson phone or purchased an Ericsson accessory. A browser game was developed and released in 2001 to promote the game. After becoming presumed lost, it was later restored and made playable by archivists and fans of the Jak and Daxter series. The game was originally slated for a North American ship date of December 11, but was moved up to December 4. A European release followed in the same month.

In 2012, a high-definition remaster was included in the Jak and Daxter Collection for the PlayStation 3; the collection was also released for the PlayStation Vita in 2013. In 2017, the game became available on the PlayStation 4 as a digital download through the PlayStation Store service. Limited edition physical versions for the PlayStation 4 were released by Limited Run Games in 2019.

== Reception ==
Reception

Aggregate score
Aggregator	Score
Metacritic	90/100

Review scores
Publication	Score
AllGame	4/5
Electronic Gaming Monthly	24.5/30
EP Daily	9.5/10
Eurogamer	9/10
Famitsu	34/40
Game Informer	9.25/10
GamePro	4.5/5
GameRevolution	A−
GameSpot	8.8/10
GameSpy	4.5/5
GameZone	9.8/10
IGN	9.4/10
Official U.S. PlayStation Magazine	5/5
PALGN	8/10
X-Play	4/5

Jak and Daxter: The Precursor Legacy received "universal acclaim", according to the review aggregator website Metacritic. The game met and exceeded the expectations of IGN's David Dzyrko, which had been built by the media and audience's anticipation of the game. He proclaimed it to be one of the greatest platformers released, standing alongside the best games by Nintendo and Rare. Brian Gee of GameRevolution deemed the game a benchmark for its genre, claiming that it "will change the way you look at platformers". Mugwum of Eurogamer declared the game to have surpassed Super Mario 64 and Banjo-Kazooie, citing its strong combination of elements despite having no great innovations.

Critics hailed the game as a visual and technical masterpiece for its vibrant, detailed environments, seamless rendering, and absence of load times, setting a benchmark for platformers on the PS2. Dzyrko described the worlds as "breathtaking", citing the environmental details and realistic day-night lighting shifts. Andrew Reiner of Game Informer praised the meticulous environmental details, saying that he often "found [him]self staring in awe" at them. Shane Satterfield of GameSpot called it one of the PS2's most visually impressive games, emphasizing its vast polygon counts, vivid high-resolution textures with no pixelation, and real-time lighting. Scott Alan Marriott of AllGame lauded the visuals as "near perfect", citing vibrant colors, fluid animation, dramatic lighting, and weather effects. Joe Rybicki of Official U.S. PlayStation Magazine compared the visual style to a "really high-quality hand-drawn cartoon" and admired the subtle environmental details such as the coppery, metallic sheen of the Precursor ruins and the slight heat haze in the volcanic area.

The massive draw distance was highlighted, with Rybicki marveling at seeing every area from a high place, and Louis Bedigian of GameZone hailing the game as "the first 3D platformer to fully render every background as far out as the eye can see". The special effects and character animation were also commended. Marriott detailed the lighting effects and comical animations for the enemies, who react upon spotting Jak or registering a hit against him. Mugwum noted the heat haze effects, real-time lighting and weather cycles. Barak Tutterrow of GameSpy singled out the volcanic area as a personal favorite for its amount of effects without slowdown. Dzyrko praised the character animation and body language as rivaling that of high-budget animated films. Satterfield compared the fluid animation to Disney productions and noted that the facial animations were perfectly synched with the dialogue.

The seamless, interconnected world was regarded as groundbreaking in its presentation as a living, immersive environment. Critics emphasized that the absence of load times contributed to the impression of a cohesive and fully realized world. Dzyrko, Mugwum and Tutterrow highlighted the persistent progression system in which completed tasks and actions remain in effect, contrasting the resetting levels of Super Mario 64. Gee praised the freedom of exploring such a large environment as a platformer benchmark, estimating that it would take an hour to traverse one end of the game's world to the other. Bedigian described the world as bigger than any other platformer before it, claiming the game would not have been possible on any other console. Satterfield noted that the game's areas were massive, but lacked warp points within them, which sometimes made navigation tedious. He also faulted the use of invisible barriers, which limited exploration.

Although the gameplay was considered polished and enjoyable, critics deemed it lacking in innovation, relying on familiar platforming tropes like collecting items and performing fetch quests. Satterfield noted that the game's objectives "maintain the status quo" for platformers, but he appreciated the puzzles that exploited timed Eco effects, which brought excitement to those particular objectives. Chris Johnston of Electronic Gaming Monthly (EGM) said that the game's polish and craft made the genre's "old stand-bys" (such as riding vehicles or hitting timed switches) fun, though James "Milkman" Mielke of the same publication criticized the repetitive fetch quests, suggesting that the game's structure would appeal more to younger players. Marriott described the game as a straightforward platformer with familiar objectives (collecting Precursor Orbs and Power Cells), but said that the diversity of the tasks kept the game engaging despite the sense of déjà vu from Super Mario 64, Gex or Spyro. Mugwum praised the game's design of unlimited lives and persistent progress as "a reward structure that deserves mimicry", and Jason D'Aprile of Extended Play credited the frequent save spots for reducing frustration, though Satterfield warned that the three-hit health system may quickly wear patience thin. The lack of bosses, totaling three, was considered a drawback, with Shane Bettenhausen of EGM identifying the flaw as a holdover from Super Mario 64.

The controls were regarded as tight and responsive; Dzyrko praised them as having the "Mario feel" of inherently fun movement, and Bedigian derived particular enjoyment from using Jak's rolling jump for navigation. Matt Keller of PALGN additionally called the camera "one of the best ever", highlighting its quick adjustment, though Rybicki and D'Aprile found it somewhat unwieldy. Satterfield criticized Jak's small moveset, which limited gameplay depth, suggesting that making Daxter playable at some point could have mitigated the issue. Rybicki noted that Jak's lunging punch attack was occasionally problematic to use near cliffs, and that double-jumping could be hit-or-miss with the analog buttons.

The story was deemed simple and unremarkable, serving as a basic framework for the gameplay. Satterfield called the story a shallow affair with few twists, as was the stereotype of platformers, and said that the dialogue was rarely interesting. Rybicki wished for a deeper story, given the potential of the Precursor mythology, but found the characters entertaining, and he and Dzyrko appreciated the story establishing reasons for collecting the game's items, lessening the usual arbitrariness. Reactions to Daxter's humor were unfavorable. Reiner found his quips somewhat annoying but occasionally funny. Satterfield noted that his jokes tended to fall flat, and Keller said that he had a habit of whining and causing trouble by saying too much. Mielke dismissed his "Jar Jar-esque zaniness" as juvenile.

Reactions to the audio were generally positive. Critics praised the voice-acting, with Gee pointing out Dee Snider and Max Casella's involvement and Tutterrow specifying Keira, the Geologist and Boggy Billy as stand-out voices. The sound effects were regarded as immersive; Dzyrko and Marriott emphasized the environmental ambience, and they and Tutterrow highlighted the various footstep sounds, with Tutterrow favoring the walks through metal buildings. The music had a more mixed reception. Some deemed the soundtrack sparse and unmemorable, though Dzyrko, D'Aprile and Reiner were more positive. Mugwum said that the soundtrack's modesty complemented the pleasureful experience, and Keller highlighted its dynamic changes.

The game's brevity was noted, with estimates generally falling between 10 and 15 hours. Tutterow attributed the game's length to a balanced difficulty, while Keller considered the difficulty too low. Rybicki acknowledged the game's short length, but said that the game never felt too easy despite the unlimited lives. D'Aprile regarded the game as a "long and challenging endeavor", assessing the difficulty as middling, and Bettenhausen described it as a "colossal adventure" that cannot be completed within a weekend.

=== Sales and awards ===
By July 2006, Jak and Daxter: The Precursor Legacy sold 1.7 million copies and earned $49 million in the United States, becoming the 19th highest-selling game launched for the PS2, Xbox, or GameCube in that country. As of December 2007, Jak and Daxter has sold 2.01 million copies in the United States alone. Jak and Daxter received a "Gold Prize" at Sony's PlayStation Awards in Japan for selling over 500,000 units.

In IGN PS2's Game of the Year Awards, Jak and Daxter won the award for Best Platformer and was co-runner-up (with Baldur's Gate: Dark Alliance) for Best Graphics, behind Metal Gear Solid 2: Sons of Liberty. The game received two nominations at the 5th Annual Interactive Achievement Awards for Outstanding Achievement in Game Design and Console Action/Adventure Game of the Year, but lost to Grand Theft Auto III and Halo: Combat Evolved respectively. The game was a nominee for GameSpot's annual "Best Platform Game" award among console games, which went to Conker's Bad Fur Day. At the 2002 Game Developers Choice Awards, Daxter won the Original Game Character of the Year award. The game was also nominated for Excellence in Programming and Excellence in Visual Arts, but respectively lost to Black & White and Ico. In the inaugural NAVGTR Awards, the game received three nominations for Outstanding Control Precision, Outstanding Graphics (Technical), and Outstanding Original Action Game, losing the first two to Halo: Combat Evolved and the latter to Max Payne. The game was runner-up for PS2 Platform Game of the Year in GameSpy's 2001 Game of the Year Awards, behind Klonoa 2: Lunatea's Veil.

Accolades for Jak and Daxter: The Precursor Legacy
Year	Award Ceremony	Category	Result
2002	IGN PS2 Game of the Year Awards	Best Platformer	Won
2002	IGN PS2 Game of the Year Awards	Best Graphics	Runner-up
2002	5th Annual Interactive Achievement Awards	Outstanding Achievement in Game Design	Nominated
2002	5th Annual Interactive Achievement Awards	Console Action/Adventure Game of the Year	Nominated
2002	GameSpot Presents: The Best and Worst of 2001	Best Platform Game	Nominated
2002	2nd Annual Game Developers Choice Awards	Original Game Character of the Year (Daxter)	Won
2002	2nd Annual Game Developers Choice Awards	Excellence in Programming (Andy Gavin and Stephen White for programming)	Nominated
2002	2nd Annual Game Developers Choice Awards	Excellence in Visual Arts (Greg Griffith, Bill Harper, John Kim, Jordan Pitchon, Bob Rafei, Josh Scherr and Rob Titus for animation)	Nominated
2002	1st NAVGTR Awards	Outstanding Control Precision	Nominated
2002	1st NAVGTR Awards	Outstanding Graphics, Technical	Nominated
2002	1st NAVGTR Awards	Outstanding Original Action Game	Nominated
2002	GameSpy Game of the Year Awards	PS2 Platform Game of the Year	Runner-up

== Legacy ==
Naughty Dog later developed two sequels, Jak II (2003) and Jak 3 (2004), and the racing game Jak X: Combat Racing (2005). In 2022, a group of fans reverse-engineered the game and unofficially ported it to modern PC platforms.
