= Major Havoc =

1984 video game

- Arcade flyer
- Developer: Atari, Inc.
- Publishers: Atari, Inc.
- Designers: Owen Rubin; Mark Cerny
- Programmers: Owen Rubin; Mark Cerny
- Platform: Arcade
- Release: NA: January 1984
- Genre: Action
- Modes: Single-player, multiplayer

Major Havoc (or The Adventures of Major Havoc) is a 1984 action video game developed and published by Atari, Inc. in 1984. A vector-based upright arcade cabinet, Major Havoc consists of several smaller game experiences played in succession, including a fixed shooter, platformer, and a lunar lander sequence. It was developed by Owen Rubin with some levels designed and tuned by Mark Cerny, who joined the development team approximately a year into the game's development.

The game was released as a dedicated cabinet in January 1984 and then in March 1984 as a conversion kit for older vector arcade games like Tempest. Dedicated versions of the game used a roller control for left-right movement, while conversion kits used their native controller hardware, such as the Tempest rotary spinner knob.

== Plot ==
According to the story provided by the game's original cabinet, long ago the evil Vaxxian Empire overran the galaxy. Most of humanity was enslaved and abducted to the Vaxxian homeworld. A few humans, who were scientists, managed to escape. At the current moment (according to the timeline of the game), the Empire has since collapsed, but numerous Vaxxian space stations, all blindly controlled and defended by robots, still remain in the galaxy, mindlessly pursuing their original orders.

The small band of scientists who initially escaped managed to clone the great human hero Major Havoc, in order to fly his Catastrofighter through a wormhole in space, so that he may lead a clone army against the dreaded Vaxxian robots, and to liberate the remnants of humanity by destroying the enemy space stations. The player controls Major Havoc, the leader of this very band of clones.

Some games identified the Vaxxian homeworld as Maynard, referring to the town of Maynard, Massachusetts, home of Digital Equipment Corporation, manufacturer of the VAX minicomputer.

== Gameplay ==
Platform segment

The player controls the titular character, Major Rex Havoc, first in the "shoot-'em-up" style game, in which the player operated Major Havoc's spaceship, the Catastrofighter, against the numerous robot ships who defend the enemy space stations. The ships are encased in a sort of "buckyball" force-field shield which must be shot first before the ship can be killed.

In the next phase, the player lands on the robot space station by centering the Catastrofighter in between the moving white line and Major Havoc would exit his ship and enter the space-station. The roller-knob controlled left and right character movement and a "jump" button permits the player's character to leap over obstacles. The object is to get to the core of the space station, sabotage the reactor, and escape to a minimum safe distance before the space station explodes. Red arrows point the direction going in and the word "OUT" appears on the arrows during escape to point the direction out. The levels get gradually more complicated and difficult to navigate as the player progresses. Upon a successful mission, the next space station becomes more difficult and the time allotted (both in and out) is decreased.

The game includes a "warp system" that lets the player to skip levels and gain bonus points. Warps are activated by a Breakout game at the bottom-right of the screen, where there are two- or three-digit numbers. The player has to move the roller controller until the number matches the number required to warp. For example, the red warp requires the number 23, so the player moves the roller to the right or left until the first digit matches 2, then the player clicks the fire button, the Breakout ball starts moving, so the player has to play the game while moving the roller to the 3 at the same time. When the player enters the warp code, the player is transported to a higher level.

Extra lives are earned not only by achieving a certain number of points, but also by completing the Breakout mini-game.

== Reception ==
Gene Lewin of Play Meter magazine reviewed the arcade game in January 1984, scoring it 2 out of 10 for initially being an expensive dedicated cabinet rather than a more affordable conversion kit.

== Legacy ==
Major Havoc was re-released as part of compilations of older Atari games, such as Atari Anthology. In July 2010, the game was re-released on Microsoft's Game Room service for its Xbox 360 console and for Games for Windows Live. In March 2011 a port was released on Nintendo DS and iOS as part of the Atari's Greatest Hits Vol. 2 collection.

Major Havoc was the inspiration for Japanese computer game developers of the 1980s. The game served as a direct prototype for Theseus on MSX computers - its creators wanted to replicate the flying feel of Major Havoc and achieve smooth scrolling on home systems. In addition, the first part of Major Havoc became the basis for Silpheed on PC-88/98 personal computers. Although Major Havoc was not a major commercial success in the West, it had a significant impact on the development of the Japanese computer game industry.

== World record ==
According to Twin Galaxies, Ettore Ciaffi, of New York, scored a world record 1,940,078 points on June 28, 1985, at the Broadway Arcade during the Video Game Masters Tournament.

== See also ==
- Xybots, later Atari Games title themed after Major Havoc
