= Spyro the Dragon =

1998 video game

- North American box art
- Developer: Insomniac Games
- Publisher: Sony Computer Entertainment
- Producers: Michael John; Seth Luisi
- Artist: Charles Zembillas
- Writer: Peter Kleiner
- Composer: Stewart Copeland
- Series: Spyro
- Engine: Panoramic engine
- Platform: PlayStation
- Release: NA: September 9, 1998; EU: October 23, 1998
- Genres: Platform, action-adventure
- Mode: Single-player

Spyro the Dragon is a 1998 platform game originally developed by Insomniac Games and published by Sony Computer Entertainment for the PlayStation. The first game in the Spyro series, it stars the title character, a young purple dragon named Spyro, and his dragonfly companion, Sparx, who must journey across the Dragon Kingdom to defeat Gnasty Gnorc, who has overtaken the five dragon Homeworlds by trapping the other dragons in crystal and turning their hoard of gems into an army of minions. Spyro the Dragon is an open-ended 3D platformer, featuring large, sprawling levels in which the player must locate collectable items, among which are gemstones, crystallized dragons, and stolen dragon eggs. Spyro's abilities include fire breath, a head-on charging attack, and a mid-air glide, which he can use to scale large distances, all of which must be used strategically to find items and defeat enemies.

Insomniac began developing Spyro the Dragon following the release of their debut title, Disruptor, which had sold poorly but was praised by critics and impressed Universal Interactive enough for them to encourage the studio to make another game. After artist Craig Stitt suggested a game about a dragon, the team initially drew inspiration from the film Dragonheart, intending the project to be a mature title with a dark, realistic tone. Direction was eventually shifted towards a whimsical and light-hearted tone to appeal to a wider audience. The game was one of the first on the PlayStation to utilize shifting levels of detail among rendered objects, thanks to a panoramic engine developed by Alex Hastings, which allowed the game's open-ended nature to be fully realized. Stewart Copeland, the former drummer for the Police, composed the game's music, and the titular character was voiced by Carlos Alazraqui, with additional voices being provided by Clancy Brown, Michael Gough, and Jamie Alcroft.

Sony Computer Entertainment released Spyro the Dragon as part of a broader effort to reach younger demographics and compete with the Nintendo 64. Although sales were initially sluggish, it found larger success following the advent of the 1998 holiday season and went on to sell nearly five million copies worldwide, making it one of the best-selling PlayStation games. Critics praised the game's graphics, gameplay, and music, while some noted its low difficulty level. Several reviewers also highlighted the game's unusually long draw distance and rendering techniques, with some publications describing the title as groundbreaking in the platformer genre. The game established Spyro as a well-known platforming mascot on the PlayStation alongside Crash Bandicoot, and two sequels, titled Spyro 2: Ripto's Rage! and Spyro: Year of the Dragon, were later released for the PlayStation in 1999 and 2000, respectively. Although Insomniac gave up development rights to the Spyro series after the third game, the success of the PlayStation titles led to a continued series across various platforms. The game, alongside its two successors, was later remade as part of Spyro Reignited Trilogy in 2018.

== Gameplay ==
Gameplay on a Sony PlayStation showing Spyro and his companion Sparx in the first boss level "Toasty"

Spyro the Dragon is a 3D platform game; the player controls the titular character as he ventures across the realms of the Dragon World to defeat the antagonistic Gnasty Gnorc, as well as rescue his fellow dragons and recover all of their stolen treasure. Worlds consist of six dragon "home worlds", each of which acts as a dedicated hub, containing portals that serve as gateways to different levels. The player must progress from one Homeworld to the next by talking to a balloonist, who transports Spyro to the next world on a hot air balloon after the player has found the required collectibles in the current given world. In addition to regular platforming stages, each Homeworld contains a boss fight and a hidden flight stage that involves flying throughout an environment and destroying a number of objects.

The levels in Spyro the Dragon are open-ended, and they revolve around exploring and obtaining various collectible items to progress in the game. Each stage contains many crystallized dragons, whom Spyro must turn back to normal by locating and stepping on their statue bases. These dragons give the player advice on how to progress through the game, as well as their respective locations acting as save points after the dragon has been freed. Another important collectible in the game is the dragons' stolen treasure, which is dispersed throughout each level in the form of multicolored gemstones. These gems are located in numerous different places, including inside enemies, breakable boxes, and treasure chests, and most stages contain a set amount of treasure to be found. There are also stolen dragon eggs that must be reclaimed by chasing and defeating thieves. Finding every collectible in the game unlocks an additional world that otherwise cannot be accessed.

Spyro has two main offensive moves, which are used to attack enemies as well as destroy certain objects: charging, in which Spyro sprints forward and rams into things with his head, and breathing fire. These attacks must be used appropriately for certain enemies and situations; for instance, some enemies carry fireproof metal armor, meaning that they can only be defeated by charging, while larger enemies can only be hit using fire breath, as they will immediately crush Spyro otherwise. Spyro can also use his wings to glide in midair, letting him travel further distances in the air and access areas otherwise unreachable via a regular jump. Throughout the game, Spyro is accompanied by Sparx, a yellow dragonfly who protects Spyro from taking damage and serves as the player's system of health. Sparx's current health is represented by the color of his body; if Spyro is hurt by an obstacle, such as an enemy or by touching water, Sparx changes colors, with yellow, blue, and green representing different subsequent amounts of withheld damage. If the player is damaged too many times, Sparx disappears, leaving Spyro vulnerable to losing a life if he is hurt again. Sparx can be rejuvenated by consuming butterflies, which are found by killing passive creatures such as sheep that roam throughout most levels. Sparx also helps Spyro collect items by retrieving any gems that Spyro passes by.

== Plot ==
In the world of dragons, the Dragon Kingdom consists of five Homeworlds – the Artisans, the Peace Keepers, the Magic Crafters, the Beast Makers, and the Dream Weavers – which have lived in harmony for many years. One day, a TV interview with a pair of dragons from the Artisan realm catches the attention of Gnasty Gnorc, a powerful gnorc (half gnome and half orc) who was banished from the kingdom due to his abrasive demeanor and sent to an abandoned junkyard, which he has renamed to "Gnasty's World". The dragons' openly dismissive and derisive commentary concerning Gnasty enrages him, driving him to unleash a full-fledged attack on the kingdom. Using his magic, he casts a spell across the land that encases every dragon in a crystal shell; he also steals the dragons' prized collection of treasure, turning the gemstones into devious gnorc soldiers and other creatures to help him take over the dragon worlds. Spyro, a young purple dragon, is the only dragon that manages to avoid getting crystallized by the attack. Aided by his dragonfly companion, Sparx, Spyro eagerly sets out to locate and defeat Gnasty.

Spyro visits each of the dragon homeworlds, defeating Gnasty's forces who have been set out to stop him. Along the way, he frees the crystallized dragons, who give him advice and urge him to recover any stolen treasure and dragon eggs along the way. He eventually makes his way to Gnasty's World, where he finally confronts and defeats Gnasty. After Spyro's quest is over, he has access to Gnasty's treasure portal, which can only be opened if Spyro rescues every dragon in the kingdom and recovers all of the dragons' treasure and retrieves the stolen dragon eggs. A secret ending can then be unlocked by retrieving everything inside of the treasure portal. In this ending, Spyro is seen getting interviewed on TV when another spell is placed on the dragons, prompting Spyro to set out on yet another adventure.

== Development ==
=== Concept ===
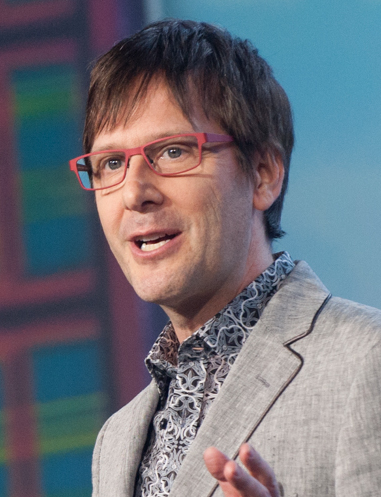
Mark Cerny in 2014

Spyro the Dragon was the second game developed by Insomniac Games, following the release of their first game, Disruptor, in December 1996. Although Disruptor was a commercial failure, its positive critical reception was enough to impress Universal Interactive Studios and encourage the team to continue with their next endeavor.

The idea of a game about a dragon was introduced by Insomniac artist Craig Stitt, who suggested the concept out of his own interest in the mythical creature. Initially, the game's tone was far darker and more realistic; according to Insomniac's COO, John Fiorito, who joined the company in 1997 during Spyro's development, inspiration was taken in part from the film DragonHeart, and the game was initially "realistic and kind of dark and gritty". The original pitch was made under the title Lifespan, and would have involved the dragon defending its lair over thousands of years and experiencing nine different eras of human invaders. This would have included both union and confederacy attackers during the US Civil War; it would have been possible to "get them to fight each other". Lifespan's gameplay would have alternated between that of a flight simulator and corridor shooter for interior and exterior areas. At the game's climax, a tenth era would have featured an alien invasion and would align the dragon with earth's forces to face the invaders in space. A revised pitch, then titled DragonSpan, increased the scope to twelve eras and had the dragon age and grow over the course of the game. The complete pitch documentation for both versions were donated to the Video Game History Foundation by Stitt in 2025.

Mark Cerny, an executive at Universal Interactive Studios and the game's producer, advised that the team create a game with more mass market appeal, as the demographics of the PlayStation were decreasing and its selection of children's titles were greatly outnumbered by the Nintendo 64's. The game would eventually take a more whimsical, light-hearted direction.

According to programmer Peter Hastings, the dragon character was originally going to be named "Pete", but due to copyright concerns over similarities to the Disney film Pete's Dragon, the name was scrapped. After considering the name "Pyro," which was ultimately considered "too mature", they finally settled on "Spyro". Stitt's production documents also listed support characters for Pete that were not retained, such as a friendly gnorc named Gruph, a sheep named Shank, a centaur love interest named Amber, and Snorch, Pete's father and king of the dragons.

In-game dialogue was written by Peter Kleiner, and Spyro's character was designed by Charles Zembillas, who had previously done design work on Crash Bandicoot. Spyro was originally going to be green, but the developers worried he would blend in with grass, so they eventually changed him to purple. During development of Spyro, Insomniac had a very close relationship with Crash Bandicoot creator and fellow PlayStation developer Naughty Dog, who had their office located across the hall from theirs. The two developers frequently worked together, playing early builds of each other's games and later sharing game technology. As a result, a demo of Crash Bandicoot: Warped was hidden in Spyro, and vice versa.

=== Design ===
Producer and designer Michael John cited Super Mario 64 as an influence on Spyro the Dragon, with its long views, architectural landmarks, and playable hub area. Insomniac consciously made their game have more collectibles than Super Mario 64 and were inspired to make their character fundamentally fun to control. In addition to that game, producer Mark Cerny listed Crash Bandicoot, Disruptor, and Earthworm Jim as major influences on the design. Spyro the Dragon was unique compared to other 3D platform games of the time; Spyro's ability to glide allowed him to travel long distances in the air, meaning that the player could cross almost an entire level if starting from a high enough point. While this made designing levels more difficult for the team, it also meant that levels could be made more open-ended and explorative in nature. To make Spyro’s controls feel fluid, Matt Whiting—a NASA engineer who specialized in flight controls—was brought on to help with programming camera movement as well as Spyro's movement controls. The game's camera was particularly challenging; initially, it always followed directly behind Spyro, but the resulting high-speed movements were found to make several playtesters feel nauseous. This was most evident with Spyro's basic jump, which triggered the camera to quickly tilt up and down, compared by Whiting to the motion of a rocking boat; this was ultimately tweaked so that the camera would stay steady. Spyro was coded with efficiency in mind, as 3D rendering technology was new at the time and the game had to fit the limited specifications of the PlayStation. Around 80% of the game's code was written using Assembly, while other parts were programmed in C due to its simplicity and speed.

=== Graphics ===
Spyro the Dragon made use of a 3D panoramic engine, developed by Alex Hastings, that could display far-away objects by utilizing varying levels of detail, a method of rendering which was new and unexplored at the time. The developers believed that the engine would be fitting for the game, as it could allow for more expansive levels that could take advantage of the character's abilities, such as gliding. This dynamic system, used to complement the large and sprawling environments, generated two different versions of a level; one version rendered in high detail and the other a simpler, textureless render. Objects in the player's vicinity were drawn using the detailed render, whereas distant ones were drawn from the simple render. This system allowed objects to be displayed from far distances while adhering to the PlayStation's limited RAM capabilities; it was one of the first video games to make use of such a system.

The game made extensive use of vertex shading to colour objects and provide light and shade- with the smooth skies entirely reliant on the technique to depict clouds and other distant details without the use of textures. Base textures were intentionally kept relatively desaturated so as to prevent them from becoming oversaturated with use of the technique.

=== Audio ===
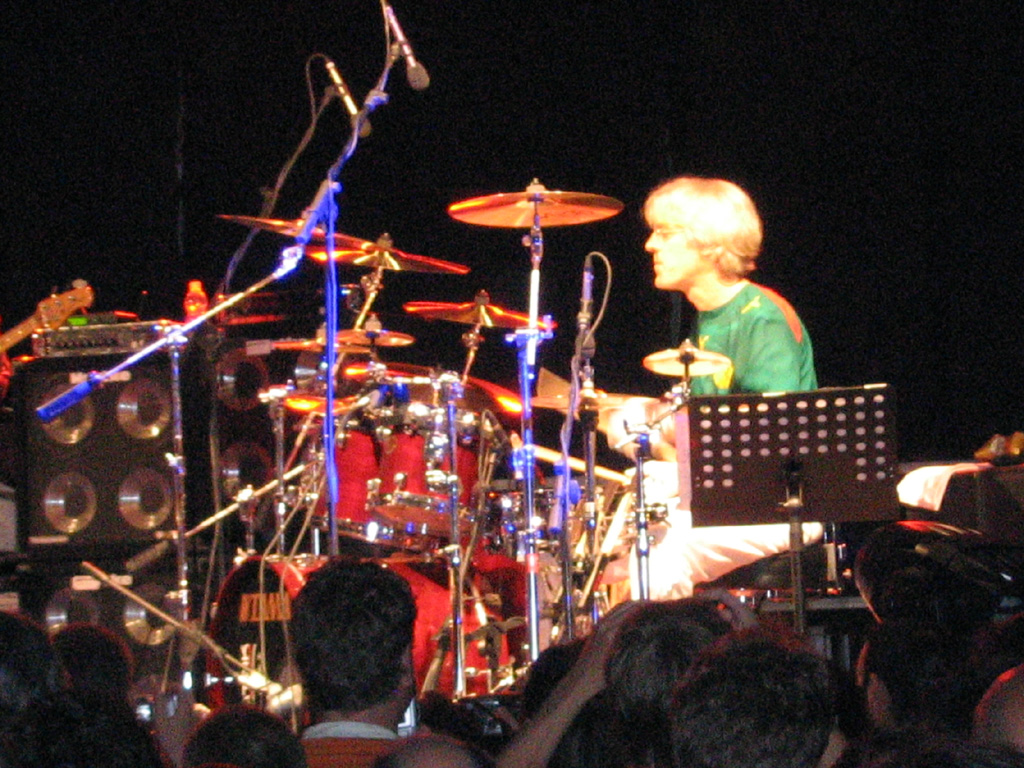
Stewart Copeland in 2006

The game's music was composed and produced by Stewart Copeland, formerly the drummer for the British band the Police. Copeland was given early builds of the game's levels, which he played through to get a feel for them and come up with a fitting composition. He was also given game cheats such as invincibility so that he could have an easier time clearing levels. Copeland wrote "roughly three songs a day", each of which he further developed and polished the next day. According to Copeland, each song in the game was written to correspond to a specific level, but this correlation ultimately went unused. Copeland has looked back positively on his work on Spyro, calling the game's music some of his best compositions.

Carlos Alazraqui provided the voice of Spyro in the game, and additional voices were done by Clancy Brown, Michael Gough, Jamie Alcroft and Michael Connor. Alazraqui explained in an issue of Electronic Gaming Monthly that he tried to make Spyro's voice sound like "a kid at camp that everybody likes." Alazraqui did not continue in this role after the first game, being replaced by Tom Kenny for the sequels.

== Release ==
Spyro the Dragon was first unveiled at the 1998 E3 convention in Atlanta, Georgia. It was then later released in North America on September 9, 1998, and in Europe on October 23 of the same year. According to Sony Computer Entertainment's American Marketing Vice President, Andrew House, at a press party in Las Vegas, the game, along with other upcoming 4th quarter PlayStation releases such as Crash Bandicoot: Warped, A Bug's Life, and Rugrats: Search for Reptar, was part of a general effort to appeal to a wider demographic of younger audiences and provide more games suited for younger players to compete with the Nintendo 64, which had a far larger library of children's titles at the time compared to the PlayStation's largely adult-centric demographic. An advertisement campaign was pushed to promote the game, featuring a character from the game, Toasty the Sheep, protesting against the title character's actions against sheep. The campaign included TV commercials, featuring an actor in an animatronic costume of Toasty, and a promotional website, sheepagainstspyro.com. From March to May 1999, the game was one of five involved in the "Gimme Five" promotion, a campaign by Sony and General Mills that distributed $5 discount coupons toward select PlayStation titles through six leading General Mills breakfast cereals. On August 16, 1999, SCEA announced that the game would be included as a part of their "Greatest Hits" lineup of budgeted releases alongside other games such as Crash Bandicoot: Warped, Gran Turismo, Cool Boarders 3, and Twisted Metal III, and alongside the announcement of a price drop for the PlayStation console to compete with the highly anticipated launch of the Sega Dreamcast. On December 12, 2012, the game was digitally re-released to the PlayStation Store together with Spyro 2: Ripto's Rage! and Spyro: Year of the Dragon. A remake of the game, alongside its two sequels, was included as a part of the Spyro Reignited Trilogy compilation for the PlayStation 4 and Xbox One in November 2018, followed by the Nintendo Switch and Microsoft Windows in September 2019.

== Reception ==
Reception

Aggregate score
Aggregator	Score
GameRankings	85%

Review scores
Publication	Score
AllGame	4/5
Computer and Video Games	4/5
Edge	7/10
Electronic Gaming Monthly	8.5/10, 8/10, 9/10, 8/10
Game Informer	9.5/10
GamePro	18.5/20
GameSpot	8.3/10
IGN	9/10
Next Generation	4/5
PlayStation Power	82%

Spyro the Dragon currently holds a score of 85% at GameRankings, based on an aggregate of 18 reviews. IGN's Craig Harris hailed it as the most fun 3D platformer he had played since Crash Bandicoot, writing "Two claws up. Way up." Computer and Video Games called the game "easily the best 3D platform game on the PlayStation", despite noting its largely child-friendly nature. Shawn Smith of Electronic Gaming Monthly wrote that "Spyro is to the PlayStation what Banjo-Kazooie is to the Nintendo 64", and stated that it "combines the two most-important aspects in any good game: graphics and gameplay." Crispin Boyer, also of Electronic Gaming Monthly, proclaimed that Spyro "raises the bar" for 3D platformers, and wrote that it had replaced Gex 3D: Enter the Gecko as his favorite "PS mascot game". Joe Fielder of GameSpot called the game "a proficient, fully 3D platform game" for the PlayStation, comparing it favorably to one of the more recent platformers on the system, Blasto, and proclaiming that it "excels over Blasto in every way imaginable." Despite this, he wrote that the game "only gets very, very high marks, instead of outrageously high marks", citing its lack of high difficulty as the main factor that made it inferior to games like Super Mario 64 and Banjo-Kazooie. Edge named it the best 3D platform game for the PlayStation, but criticized Spyro's limited abilities and said that the game was not as varied as Super Mario 64.

Critics lauded the game's presentation, specifically speaking praise for its graphics, technical performance, and Copeland's music done for the game. GamePro reviewer "Slo Mo" wrote that the game's graphics and animations gave Spyro "the look and feel of an animated film" while calling the in-game environments "breathtaking". Harris wrote that the game "utilizes the PlayStation's hardware to the max", and praised the quality of the in-game animations; he particularly praised the rescued dragons' talking animations, which he said gave the characters "incredible personality." Fielder praised the game's dynamic lighting system and character designs, and noted "a near-complete lack of pop-up" during gameplay. Sushi-X of Electronic Gaming Monthly said that the graphics were "among the finest" on the PlayStation. AllGame editor Scott Alan Marriott applauded the graphics, scenery, characters and control as some of the best on the PlayStation, if not the best at the time of the game's release. Fielder spoke positively of Copeland's compositional work, calling it "wonderfully atmospheric." Slo Mo described the music as having a "catchy, mellow jazz-rock swing to it" while also praising the voice work for its wide array of unique voices.

Many critics held praise for the game's level design and controls, though some noted its simplicity and low difficulty level. Andy McNamara and Paul Anderson of Game Informer warned that seasoned players would not find sufficient difficulty in the game, with Anderson guessing that they would beat it in a weekend. Fielder called the level design "exceptional", while Boyer praised the levels for encouraging exploration among players. Sushi-X called the play controls "perfectly tuned" whilst Fielder wrote that they worked well both with and without the DualShock's analog stick, although Smith expressed that controls were unsuited for maneuvering in "high-risk areas." The camera system received varying reactions, with Boyer praising it as one of the best in any 3D platformer and Fielder declaring that it fixed the common issues present in most other 3D platform games, while Harris criticized its lack of precision when following the player, stating that it "tends to float around on a loose tether", and highlighted the camera system as one of the game's only flaws. Fielder wrote that an overabundance of extra lives caused the game to feel "like it was aimed at a younger or broader audience," holding the final boss and the bonus level as the only exceptions. Despite praising Spyro, Sushi-X noted the game's "lack of diversity" in obstacles and objects leading to "repetitive play." Boyer lamented that the common trope of collecting items, while still very fun in Spyro, was starting to become less interesting, while also criticizing the game's boss fights, calling them "small, easy and decidedly unBoss-like."

=== Sales and awards ===
According to Spyro's developers, sales were initially slow at the game's launch but quickly began picking up following the holiday season. In its first month of release, Spyro was the twelfth best-selling home console game in the United States. In the week of November 29, 1998, it was the third best-selling game in the UK, behind Tomb Raider and FIFA 99. At the 1999 Milia festival in Cannes, it took home a "Gold" prize for revenues above €20,000,000 in the European Union during the previous year. Spyro the Dragon received a "Gold" award from the Verband der Unterhaltungssoftware Deutschland (VUD) by the end of August 1999, for sales of at least 100,000 units across Germany, Austria and Switzerland. By December 1999, the game had sold 1,000,000 copies in North America. As of 2007, the title had gone on to sell a total of nearly 5,000,000 units.

During the 2nd Annual Interactive Achievement Awards, Spyro the Dragon was named a finalist by the Academy of Interactive Arts & Sciences for "Outstanding Achievement in Art/Graphics", "Console Action Game of the Year", and "Console Game of the Year"; the first two awards went to Banjo-Kazooie, while the latter was won by The Legend of Zelda: Ocarina of Time.

== Legacy ==
The popularity of Spyro the Dragon helped to push the character of Spyro as a popular platforming mascot for the PlayStation alongside Crash Bandicoot. It was the first game in what became an expansive video game series, spawning 2 more platforming sequels for the PlayStation – Ripto's Rage and Year of the Dragon – released in 1999 and 2000, respectively. As of the year 2000, the series had sold more than 3.2 million copies in the U.S. and over 4 million copies worldwide. Insomniac stopped developing the Spyro series after Year of the Dragon, as it finished off their 4-game contract with Universal Interactive. Despite this, the series was continued across various different developers, and shifted to several other platforms besides PlayStation. Spyro being their first considerable success, Insomniac went on to develop several other successful video game franchises, including the Ratchet & Clank series of platform games and the first-person shooter series Resistance. The game's rendering system, new and unheard of at the time, has gone on to be used in several other 3D video games.
