= Charles Zembillas =

Video game artist

- Born: Charles Steve Zembillas; Gary, Indiana, U.S.
- Occupations: Character designer; art director; educator; author; concept artist

Charles Steve Zembillas is an American character designer, art director, educator, and author. Zembillas designed early concept art for games such as Crash Bandicoot, Spyro the Dragon, and Jak and Daxter: The Precursor Legacy, as well as animated television series such as Wish Kid, Where's Waldo?, James Bond Jr., and Ghostbusters.

He teaches art in his home state of California.

== Career ==
Zembillas was a character designer for the television series She-Ra: Princess of Power from 1985 to 1987 for a total of ninety-three episodes. He was also a character designer in 1985 for the film The Secret of the Sword, and would go on to be the art director of the television series Ghostbusters for sixty-five episodes in 1986. In 1987 Zembillas was commissioned for Spiral Zone as a character designer for sixty-five episodes.

In 1991, Zembillas was commissioned to work as an animator, art director, and character designer for movies and TV shows such as Wish Kid, Where's Waldo?, Captain N, and James Bond Jr. In 1993, he was the character designer of the TV series Hurricanes as "Skevos Zembillas". In the same year, he also was the storyboard reviser for the TV series Sonic the Hedgehog.

In 1996, Zembillas worked for Naughty Dog Inc. on a new project known as "Crash Bandicoot", a video game series for the Sony PlayStation. Zembillas would continue to work for Naughty Dog in 1998 with Crash Bandicoot: Warped.

In the year 2000, Zembillas designed early concept art for Naughty Dog in the game Jak and Daxter: The Precursor Legacy, as well as Spyro: Year of the Dragon.

Zembillas is the CEO, founder, and instructor at The Animation Academy in California.

== Filmography and games ==
Date	Title	Platform	Role
1985	She-Ra: Princess of Power	TV series	Character designer
1985	The Secret of the Sword	Film	Character designer
1986	Ghostbusters	TV series	Character designer
1987	Spiral Zone	TV series	Character designer
1989	The Adventures of Ronald McDonald: McTreasure Island	Short	Model director
1991	Wish Kid	TV series	Character designer
1991	Where's Waldo?	TV series	Additional character designer
1991	Captain N and the New Super Mario World	TV series	Character designer
1991	Captain N: The Game Master	TV series	Character designer
1991	James Bond Jr.	TV series	Character designer
1992	Defenders of Dynatron City	TV short	Character designer
1993	Sonic the Hedgehog	TV series	Character designer
1993	Hurricanes	TV series	Character designer
1995	The New Adventures of Madeline	TV series	Character and prop designer
1996	Crash Bandicoot	Video game	Art director
1997	A Christmas Carol	Video	Art director
1997	Crash Bandicoot 2: Cortex Strikes Back	Video game	Art director
1998	Crash Bandicoot: Warped	Video game	Art director
1998	Spyro the Dragon	Video game	Character designer
1998	The Snowden, Raggedy Ann and Andy Holiday Show	Film	Layout supervisor
2000	Spyro: Year of the Dragon	Video game	Character designer
2001	Jak and Daxter: The Precursor Legacy	Video game	Character designer
2003	Crash Nitro Kart	Video game	Art director
