= Allegro Common Lisp =

Programming language

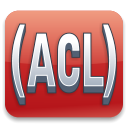
- Paradigms: Multi-paradigm: procedural, functional, object-oriented, meta, reflective, generic
- Family: Lisp
- Designed by: John Foderaro
- Developer: Franz Inc.
- First appeared: 1986; 39 years ago
- Stable release: 11.0 / January 9, 2024; 18 months ago
- Typing discipline: Dynamic, strong
- Scope: Lexical, optional dynamic
- Implementation language: Common Lisp
- Platform: IA-32, x86-64, ARM, 68000, SPARC, X-MP,
- OS: Windows (32/64-bit), macOS (Intel, 32/64-bit), Linux (32/64-bit), FreeBSD (32-bit), Solaris (x64, SPARC; 32/64-bit), UNICOS, UTS
- License: Proprietary, some freeware
- Website: franz.com/products/allegro-common-lisp

Influenced by
- Lisp, Maclisp, Macsyma, Franz Lisp

Allegro Common Lisp is a programming language with an integrated development environment (IDE), developed by Franz Inc. It is a dialect of the language Lisp, a commercial software implementation of the language Common Lisp. Allegro CL provides the full American National Standards Institute (ANSI) Common Lisp standard with many extensions, including threads, CLOS streams, CLOS MOP, Unicode, SSL streams, implementations of various Internet protocols, OpenGL interface. The first version of Allegro Common Lisp was finished at the end of 1986, originally called Extended Common Lisp. Allegro CL is available for many operating systems including Microsoft Windows (32/64-bit), and many Unix and Unix-like, 32-bit or 64-bit, including macOS (Intel, 32/64-bit), Linux (32/64-bit), FreeBSD (32-bit), Solaris (x64, SPARC; 32/64-bit), UNICOS, and UTS. Internationalization and localization support is based on Unicode. It supports various external text encodings and provides string and character types based on Universal Coded Character Set 2 (UCS-2). Allegro CL can be used with and without its integrated development environment (IDE), which is available for Windows, Linux, and on macOS in version 8.2. The IDE (written in Allegro CL) includes development tools including an editor and an interface designer. Allegro CL can be used to deliver applications.

Allegro CL is available as freeware, a Free Express Edition (with some limits like a constrained heap space) for non-commercial use. Customers can get access to much of the source code of Allegro CL.

Allegro CL includes an implementation of Prolog and an object caching database called AllegroCache.

The most recent release, Allegro CL 10.1, supports Symmetric Multiprocessing.

Allegro CL has been used to implement various applications:

- Naughty Dog used it for the development of various video games, implementing the development environments for Game Oriented Object Lisp and Game Oriented Assembly Lisp
- Allegro CL has been used to implement scheduling systems for various telescopes including the Hubble Space Telescope and the Spitzer Space Telescope

== Reception ==
Rating it 5 mice out of 5, MacUser in November 1988 said that Allegro Common Lisp 1.2.1 for Macintosh "is one of the most exciting programming environments on a personal computer", praising its Emacslike editor. While wishing for an interface builder and introductory documentation, the magazine said that "On a Macintosh II with more than 2.5 megabytes of memory, this is a development system that rivals dedicated machines at a fraction of the cost".

== See also ==
- LispWorks
