= Mark Cerny =

American video game designer (born c. 1964)

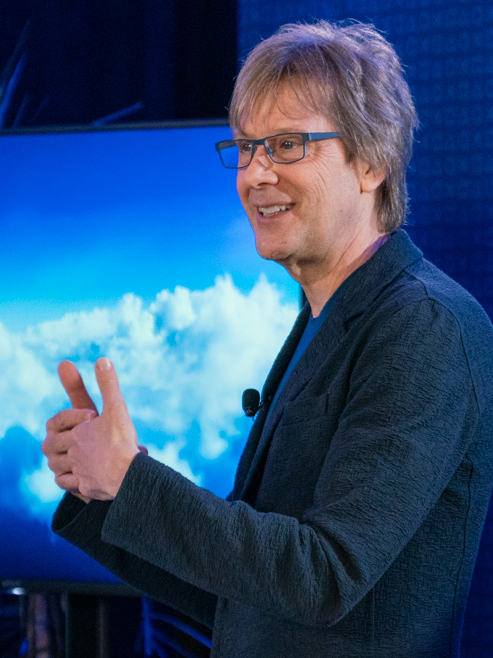
- Cerny in 2025
- Born: Mark Evan Cerny; August 24, 1964 (age 62)
- Occupations: Video game designer; producer; programmer; consultant; media proprietor
- Organization: Cerny Games
- Spouse: Katsura Cerny
- Awards: IGDA Lifetime Achievement (2004); AIAS Hall of Fame Award (2010)

Mark Evan Cerny (/ˈsɜːrni/ SUR-nee; born August 24, 1964) is an American video game designer, programmer, producer and media proprietor.

Raised in the San Francisco Bay Area, Cerny attended UC Berkeley before dropping out to pursue a career in video games. In his early years, he spent time at Atari, Sega, Crystal Dynamics and Universal Interactive Studios before becoming an independent consultant under his own company Cerny Games in 1998. While at Sega, he established Sega Technical Institute, working on games including Sonic the Hedgehog 2 (1992).

Cerny has since frequently collaborated with Sony Interactive Entertainment as a consultant, including being the lead designer for hardware of several PlayStation consoles, being called the architect of the PlayStation Vita, PS4 and PS5. He has also consulted with Naughty Dog and Insomniac Games since their creation in the 1990s, as well as other Sony first-party studios like Sucker Punch Productions. He has also developed several games, notably the arcade game Marble Madness and the Knack series, and has been credited on many more for his consulting work.

In 2004, he was the recipient of the Lifetime Achievement Award from the International Game Developers Association, and was inducted into the Academy of Interactive Arts & Sciences Hall of Fame in 2010.

== Career ==
=== 1982–1996: First years ===
Mark Evan Cerny was born in 1964. He grew up in San Francisco, and was a fan of computer programming and arcade games as a youth. He had attended University of California, Berkeley, but when he was 17 in 1982, he was invited to join Atari, and dropped out of school for the opportunity. He started working in Atari's arcade division on January 18, 1982. In those earlier days of professional game development, teams were small and each member was responsible for a wider range of roles than today. He first worked with Ed Logg on Millipede and Owen Rubin on Major Havoc. "Working at Atari early in my career was an experience I'll never forget. I got to work alongside game design legends like Ed Logg, Dave Theurer, Owen Rubin, among many others, during a time when creativity, passion and competition was at a high. Ideas that were 100% original was not only expected, but demanded. As a young 18-year-old, I couldn't ask for a better introduction for my career," said Cerny.

Cerny's first major success was the arcade game Marble Madness in which he, at age 18, acted as designer and co-programmer. During this period around 1985, he gained an interest in video game hardware, which Cerny considered far simpler than his later work with the PlayStation. By the end of the 1980s, he joined Sega, initially working at Sega's headquarters in Japan and then returning to the United States by 1991 to help establish the Sega Technical Institute. There, he worked on various Master System and Genesis releases, most notably Sonic the Hedgehog 2.

Cerny left Sega in 1992 to join the newly formed Crystal Dynamics. He initially worked on 3DO games including Crash 'n Burn (1993) and Total Eclipse (1994). Cerny was instrumental in helping Crystal Dynamics become the first American developer to secure a PlayStation development kit from Sony Computer Entertainment, having gone to Japan to negotiate the deal with Shuhei Yoshida, at that point a young executive within Sony. While the development kit had been delivered to Crystal Dynamics by 1994, Cerny had left the studio to lead Universal Pictures' newly formed multimedia division.

=== 1996–present: Partnership with Sony ===
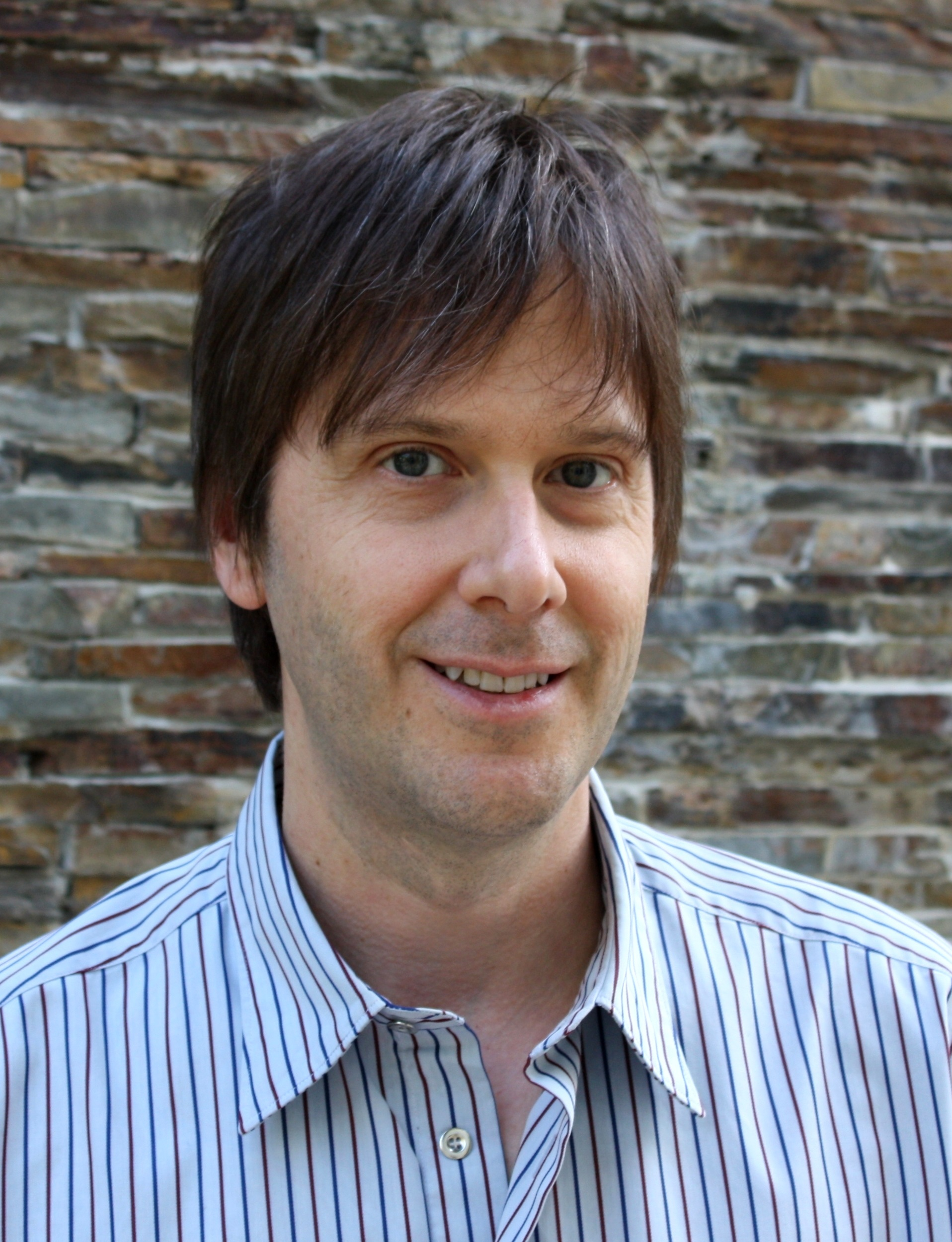
Cerny in 2010

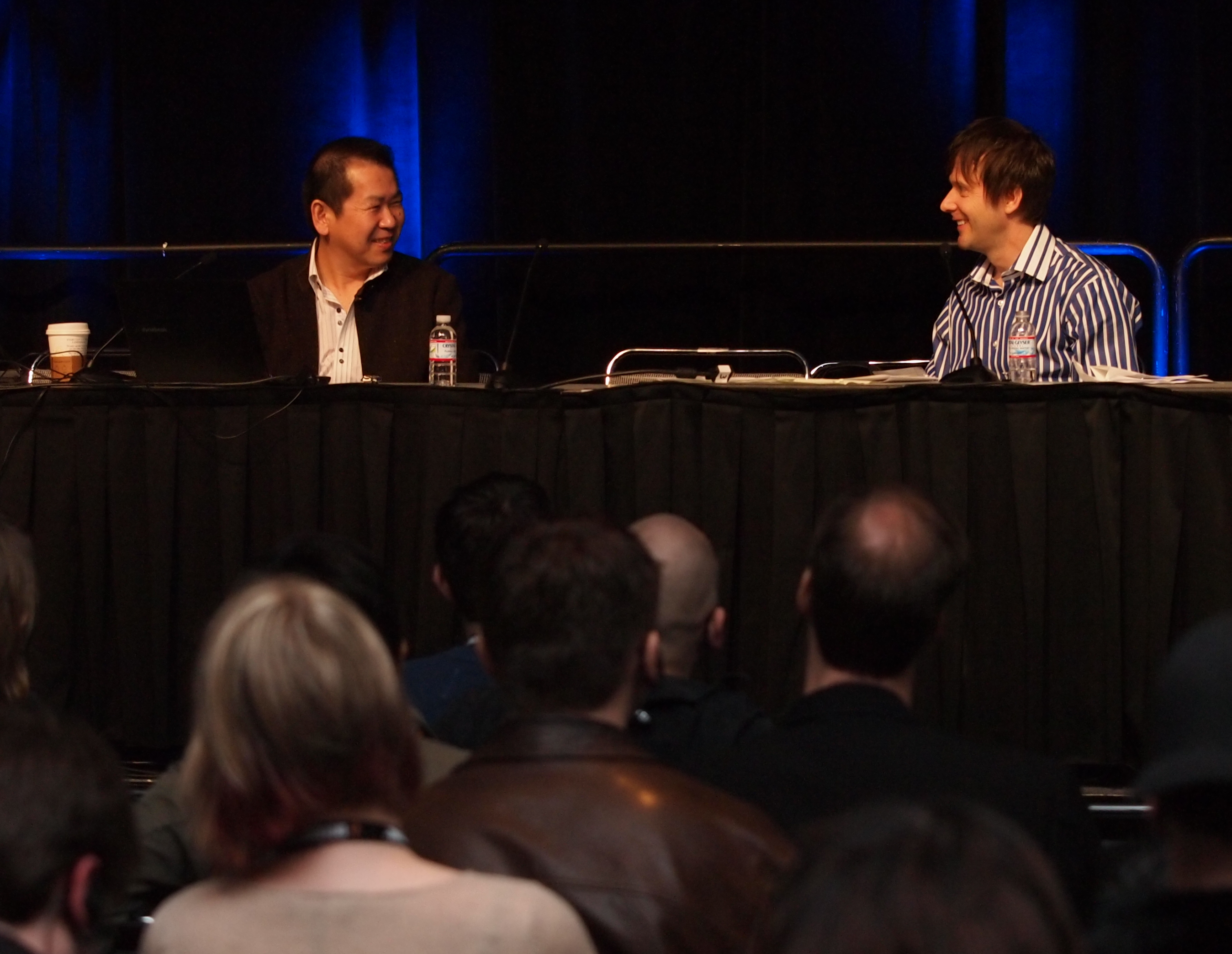
Yu Suzuki and Cerny at Game Developers Conference 2011

From 1994 to 1998, Cerny was involved with Universal Interactive Studios, a newly formed division of Universal for video games that Cerny described as a "boutique publisher". Cerny was initially a vice president of product development and later became its president. Cerny had been given a good amount of freedom with the division, stating "The best part about this was that Universal didn't really know the business and as a result I had a great big bag of money to spend and no supervision". Under Cerny, Universal Interactive Studios hired in two small and new development studios to develop for the PlayStation, aided by his past connections within Sony: the three-person Naughty Dog and two-person Insomniac Games. In the case of Naughty Dog, they were brought in to build Way of the Warrior and had signed on for three additional titles. Cerny helped with their next title, Crash Bandicoot, which Sony picked up to publish in 1996. Insomniac similarly had completed their first title Disruptor and Cerny helped them prepare the next game, Spyro the Dragon, which also was picked up and published by Sony in 1998. When Naughty Dog and Insomniac's contracts with Universal expired, both studios signed up with Sony to continue to develop games for the PlayStation. Cerny kept in close contact with both teams afterwards. In 1998, Universal as a whole had financial issues that set a hiring freeze on the Interactive Studios group. Cerny opted to leave Universal to become consultant under his own company, Cerny Games, that would allow him to keep working with Naughty Dog, Insomniac and Sony.

Around 1999, Sony was developing the hardware for the PlayStation 2. Yoshida, now executive producer of product development, contacted Cerny about helping to develop a graphics engine for the new console. Cerny accepted, and worked in Japan over a three-month span, being the first American to work on the PlayStation 2. Once the engine was complete, Cerny helped both Naughty Dog and Insomniac with their first PlayStation 2 titles, Jak & Daxter: The Precursor Legacy and Ratchet & Clank, respectively, as well as several sequels in both series that followed. During this period, Cerny developed his "Method" approach for game development from his experience on the "dos and don'ts" in the game industry. Cerny's Method has since become a standard practice in the video game development industry.

Cerny would continue his consulting with Sony. In 2003, Yoshida had been promoted to vice president of product development at Sony Computer Entertainment America, where the planning of Sony's next console the PlayStation 3 had started. Yoshida again brought Cerny to help plan out a means for the new console to share some of the same functionality as the previous consoles as to reduce the burden and cost for developers. Cerny worked with Sony and Naughty Dog to form the Initiative for a Common Engine (ICE) Team, with part of the team working directly with Sony's hardware developers in Japan to bring about Yoshida's vision. Ultimately the PlayStation 3's new core hardware, the Cell, was difficult to work with, though some of the goals of the ICE Team were implemented. In addition to hardware support, Cerny continued to assist Naughty Dog and Insomniac with their first PlayStation 3 titles, Uncharted: Drake's Fortune from Naughty Dog, Resistance: Fall of Man and Ratchet & Clank Future: Tools of Destruction for Insomniac, as well as for other Sony first-party titles, including God of War III and Killzone 3.

==== PlayStation lead architect ====
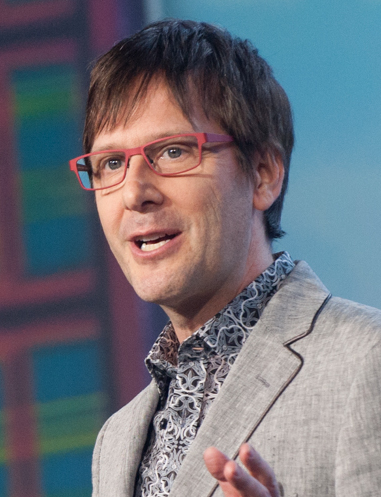
GDCA 2014

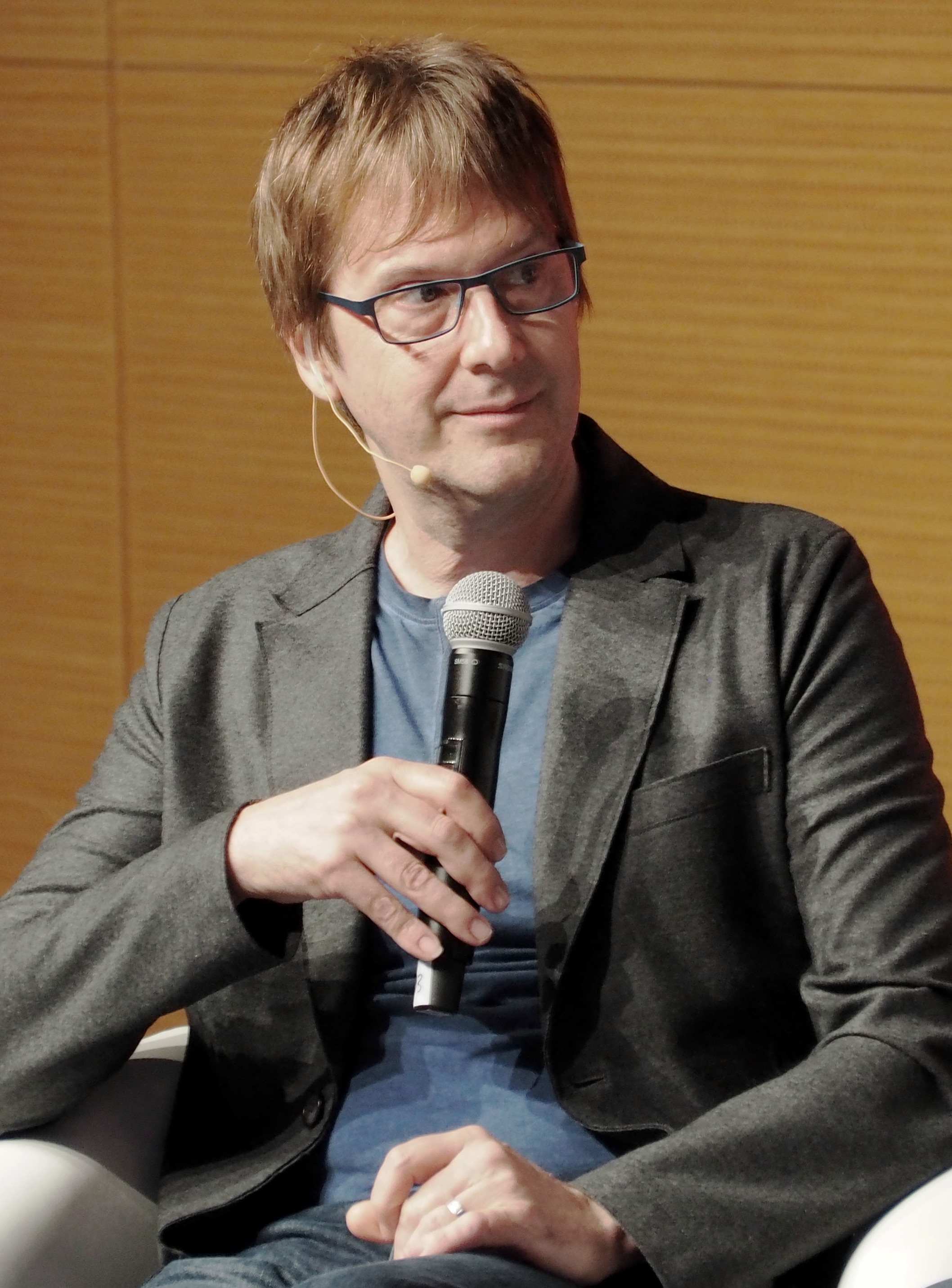
Gamelab 2018

Around 2007, Sony was looking ahead to the successor to the PlayStation 3, which had not met Sony's sales expectations in competition with Microsoft's Xbox 360, and had contributed to Ken Kutaragi's departure from Sony. A postmortem from the PlayStation 3s development revealed that either the next console would stay with the Cell processor, or move to an x86-based architecture common to personal computers. While the x86 approach would make some parts of development easier, Cerny told Sony this was currently unfavorable to the first-party developers as it would prevent them from accessing low-level functions that many used for extracting as much performance from the console. Cerny spent much of his time in November 2007 researching the history of the x86 architecture, and then proposed a plan to Yoshida for him to take on the lead development role for the next PlayStation based on what he had learned so that the next console would be developer-friendly while using the x86 architecture. Yoshida agreed, which helped to convince the upper management at Sony to allow Cerny to remain a consultant while assigned as the PlayStation 4's lead designer. Cerny's approach to the PlayStation 4's design is considered significant, as it had led the console to achieve over 100 million units sold by 2019 trailing only the PlayStation 2 in lifetime sales. Alongside hardware, Cerny led development of one of the PlayStation 4's launch games, Knack, as well as its sequel.

Cerny continued on as lead designer on Sony's future consoles, including the handheld PlayStation Vita, and for the PlayStation 5. Cerny said that his consultant status gives him freedom that being an employee of Sony would not have, such as being able to work with multiple different groups within Sony and its first-party studios for improving the PlayStation design. He also continued to consult in game design for several of Sony's first-party games, including The Last Guardian, Marvel's Spider-Man and Death Stranding. Since around 2009 and the release of the PlayStation 4, Cerny has worked on a two-year cycle where he visits most of Sony's first-party developers and other key studios to figure out what issues they have with the current hardware and what they would like to see out of future hardware. These visits may lead to mid-generation improvements in hardware revisions or improved software, or have been used to inform the direction of the next generation of hardware.

== The Method process ==
Cerny established the Method process in 2002 while consulting with Naughty Dog, Insomniac, and other Sony first-party studios. Cerny observed that there were completely different approaches needed in the preproduction stage and the production stage of video game development, and that it was impossible to put a timeline on the creative process. He suggested that the pre-production stage should be freeform, allowing the creative persons to explore a game's viability prior to full development. The end product of the preproduction stage under the Method process should be a "publishable first playable" version of the game that can be used to determine the viability of the title. This version does not need to be content-complete but provide enough to be used in playtesting from potential consumers. If the game at this state does not excite players, then the game idea should be set aside before too much effort is put into it. Once the decision is made to move forward on the game, then Cerny recommends by the Method that the typical use of scheduled milestones and deliverables to keep the project on track.

== Personal life ==
While working under Sega in Japan during the 1980s and 1990s, Cerny learned Japanese. He met his future wife in Japan, who helped him to establish Cerny Games, which she continues to manage.

== Accolades ==
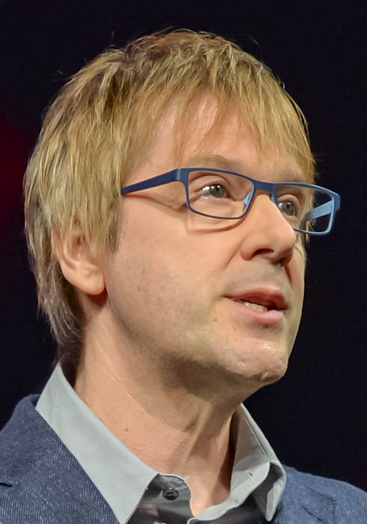
Cerny at the 2019 Game Developer Conference

The International Game Developers Association awarded Cerny with the Lifetime Achievement Award at the Game Developers Choice Awards (IGDA) in 2004. IGDA stated, "It's rare to find a 'jack-of-all-trades' who not only has the high-level vision for great game design but can act as the glue to adhere all the pieces together. His unusual but highly effective methodology has brought us some of the most entertaining games in history." He was described as "a master collaborator". His Crash Bandicoot and Spyro the Dragon games have collectively sold more than 30 million units.

In 2010, at the 13th Annual Interactive Achievement Awards, Mark Cerny was inducted into the Academy of Interactive Arts & Sciences Hall of Fame. "Mark Cerny is the closest we have come to a modern-day Da Vinci," said Joseph Olin, then-president of the AIAS. "What he does isn't restricted to a single aspect of game creation, he really is a Renaissance man. He is a diversely accomplished game designer, producer, programmer and technologist, fluent in Japanese and one of the foremost Western experts on the Japanese game market. He is also one of the only top-level independents in a business dominated by institutions."

== Works ==
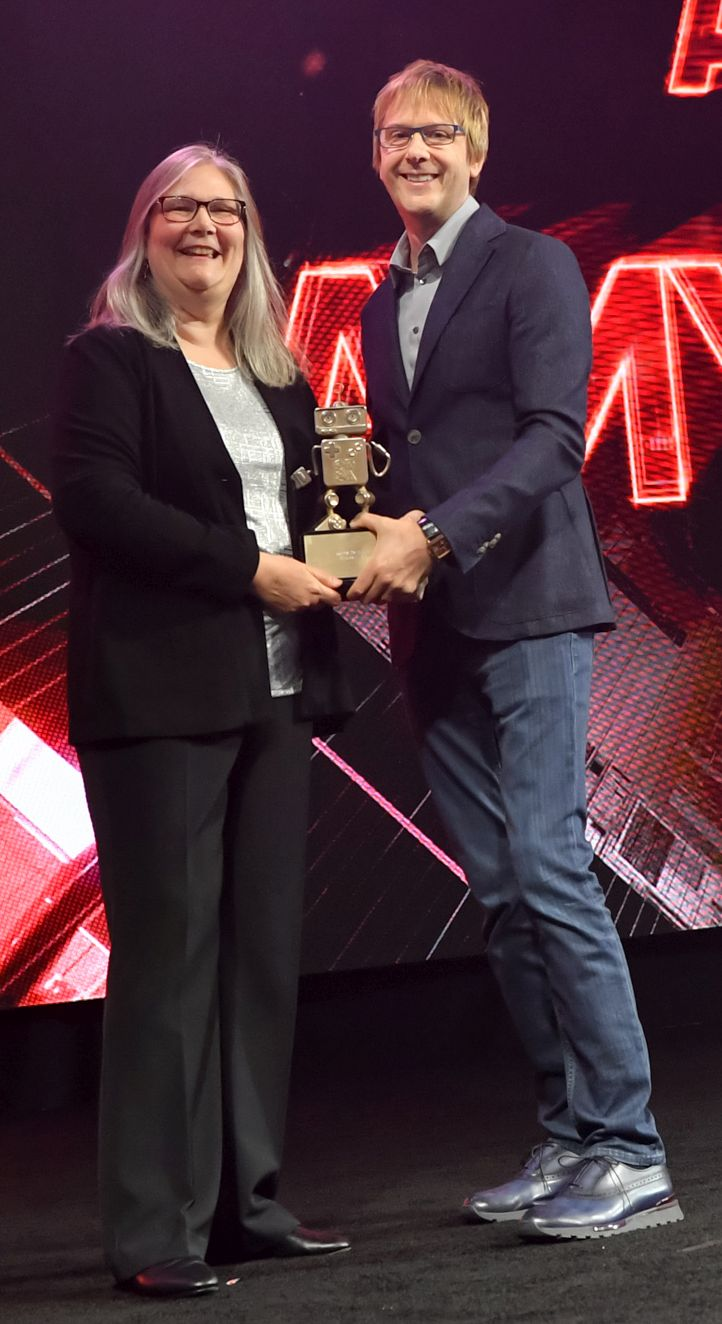
Cerny presenting a lifetime achievement award to Amy Hennig at the 2019 Game Developers Choice Awards

| Year | Game title | Role(s) | Ref. |
|---|---|---|---|
| 1984 | Major Havoc | Programmer, designer | |
| 1984 | Marble Madness | Programmer, designer | |
| 1987 | Shooting Gallery | Programmer, designer | |
| 1987 | Missile Defense 3-D | Programmer, designer | |
| 1988 | Shanghai (Note: Port to Master System) | Programmer | |
| 1989 | California Games | Programmer | |
| 1990 | Dick Tracy | Programmer, designer | |
| 1992 | Kid Chameleon | Programmer, designer | |
| 1992 | Sonic the Hedgehog 2 | Producer | |
| 1993 | Crash 'n Burn | Programmer, designer | |
| 1994 | Total Eclipse | Programmer, designer | |
| 1995 | The Ooze | Programmer | |
| 1996 | Crash Bandicoot | Executive producer | |
| 1996 | Disruptor | Executive producer, designer | |
| 1997 | Crash Bandicoot 2: Cortex Strikes Back | Producer, designer | |
| 1998 | Spyro the Dragon | Executive producer | |
| 1998 | Running Wild | Executive producer | |
| 1998 | Crash Bandicoot: Warped | Producer, designer | |
| 1999 | Spyro 2: Ripto's Rage! | Executive producer | |
| 2000 | Crash Bash | Producer, designer | |
| 2000 | Spyro: Year of the Dragon | Design consultant | |
| 2001 | Jak and Daxter: The Precursor Legacy | Programmer | |
| 2002 | Ratchet & Clank | Designer | |
| 2003 | Jak II | Programmer, designer | |
| 2003 | Ratchet & Clank: Going Commando | Designer | |
| 2004 | Ratchet & Clank: Up Your Arsenal | Design consultant | |
| 2006 | Resistance: Fall of Man | Design consultant | |
| 2007 | Uncharted: Drake's Fortune | Design consultant | |
| 2007 | Ratchet & Clank Future: Tools of Destruction | Design consultant | |
| 2008 | Resistance 2 | Designer | |
| 2010 | God of War III | Design consultant | |
| 2011 | Killzone 3 | Design consultant | |
| 2013 | Knack | Director | |
| 2016 | Ratchet & Clank | Design consultant | |
| 2016 | The Last Guardian | Executive producer | |
| 2017 | Knack 2 | Director | |
| 2018 | Marvel's Spider-Man | Executive producer | |
| 2019 | Death Stranding | Technical producer | |
| 2020 | Spider-Man: Miles Morales | Executive producer | |
| 2021 | Ratchet & Clank: Rift Apart | Executive producer | |
