= Missile Defense 3-D =

1987 video game

- Developer: Sega
- Publisher: Sega
- Designer: Mark Cerny
- Platform: Master System
- Release: NA: August 1987; EU: October 1987
- Genre: Action
- Mode: Single-player

Missile Defense 3-D is a 1987 video game developed and published by Sega for the Master System. The game is a shoot em up action video game in which players must prevent missiles descending towards the player or the surface by shooting the Light Phaser. It is the first game released for the Master System to feature the use of 3-D glasses named the SegaScope 3-D, conceived by Mark Cerny, who lobbied Sega to explore the potential of 3-D peripherals and gameplay. The game, glasses, and phaser were later packaged with special versions of the console. Upon release, Missile Defense 3-D received positive reviews, with critics highlighting the appeal of the 3-D effect and its visual presentation.

== Gameplay ==
Gameplay screenshot

Assuming the role of an engineer of the Eliminator, a nuclear missile defense system, the objective of Missile Defense 3-D is to prevent nuclear war between two cities of East and West by shooting ICBMs with the Light Phaser before they hit. Gameplay consists of targeting and shooting down missiles from East to West and vice-versa in rounds of three, with each round featuring progressively faster missiles. Missiles can also travel towards the player, causing a life to be lost if hit. If players successfully detonate all missiles in a round, the player restores a life, further rounds are skipped, and they progress to the next level. If a city is hit in the third round of a level, or players run out of lives, the game ends. Levels begin in the cities of East and West, then travel to the arctic pole and outer space.

== Development and release ==
Missile Defense 3-D was the first of several titles developed for the SegaScope 3-D, a pair of 3-D glasses compatible with the Master System. Six other titles were released, including Space Harrier 3-D, OutRun 3-D, and Zaxxon 3-D. The design of the game and glasses was led by Mark Cerny, a former Atari developer who moved to Japan to contribute to games development with Sega. Cerny was inspired to merge software with the peripherals after viewing the 1986 3D film Captain EO. He stated he was able to lobby Sega to produce the SegaScope as their arcade division "was used to creating many pieces of hardware", and developed a tech demo inspired by Pong to demonstrate the concept to the company. Sega previewed the game at the Summer 1987 and Winter 1988 Consumer Electronics Show to showcase for the glasses. The game was packaged with the SegaScope 3-D and Light Phaser as part of the Sega Super System edition of the console. Cerny considered the 3-D product line for the Master System was a success given Sega's limited market share, stating that the company sold 300,000 pairs of SegaScope 3-D glasses.

== Reception ==
=== Critical reception ===
Reception

Review scores
Publication	Score
AllGame	3/5
Computer Entertainer	4.5/5

Computer Entertainer and Computer Gaming World considered the effect of the 3-D and use of the Light Phaser created a spectacular effect, with the former praising it as "graphically outstanding" and "state of the art", and the latter praising its "eye-popping" visual presentation. VideoGames & Computer Entertainment listed the game as a honorable mention for the "Best Video Games Sound and Graphics" of 1988.

=== Retrospective reception ===
AllGame retrospectively considered that Missile Defense 3-D featured "fast and challenging" action and made good use of its 3D capabilities, but critiqued its background design as "too similar" and "basic", and that there was limited variety across levels. Writing in Playing in the Past, historian William Knoblauch wrote that the game was an example of media influenced by the Strategic Defense Initiative and Cold War era public perceptions of futuristic, space-based responses to missile defense.
