= Crash Bandicoot (video game) =

1996 video game

- North American box art
- Developer: Naughty Dog
- Publisher: Sony Computer Entertainment
- Director: Jason Rubin
- Producer: David Siller
- Designers: Jason Rubin; Bob Rafei; Taylor Kurosaki
- Programmers: Andy Gavin; Dave Baggett
- Artists: Charles Zembillas; Joe Pearson; Bob Rafei
- Writer: Joe Pearson
- Composer: Josh Mancell
- Series: Crash Bandicoot
- Platform: PlayStation
- Release: NA: September 9, 1996; EU: November 8, 1996
- Genre: Platform
- Mode: Single-player

Crash Bandicoot is a 1996 platform game developed by Naughty Dog and published by Sony Computer Entertainment for the PlayStation. The player controls Crash, a genetically enhanced bandicoot created by the mad scientist Doctor Neo Cortex. The story follows Crash as he aims to foil Cortex's plans for world domination and rescue his girlfriend Tawna, a female bandicoot also created by Cortex. The game is played from a third-person perspective in which the camera trails behind Crash, though some levels feature forward-scrolling and side-scrolling perspectives.

After accepting a publishing deal from Universal Interactive Studios, Naughty Dog co-founders Andy Gavin and Jason Rubin set out on a cross-country road trip from Boston to Los Angeles. During this time, they decided to create a character-based action-platform game from a three-dimensional perspective, having observed the graphical trend in arcade games. Upon meeting, Naughty Dog and Universal Interactive chose to develop the game for the PlayStation due to Sony's lack of a mascot character. The game's main character was tentatively named "Willy the Wombat", and cartoonists Joe Pearson and Charles Zembillas were hired to help create the game's characters and story. Crash Bandicoot was named for his habitual destruction of crates, which were inserted into the game to alleviate emptiness in the levels. Sony agreed to publish the game following a demonstration from Naughty Dog, and the game was unveiled at E3 1996.

Crash Bandicoot was released to generally positive reviews from critics, who praised the game's graphics, presentation, audio, difficulty level and title character, but criticized its linearity and lack of innovation as a platform game. The game went on to sell over 6 million units, making it one of the best-selling PlayStation games and the highest selling ranked on sales in the United States. For the game's Japanese release, the gameplay and aesthetics underwent extensive retooling to make the game more palatable for Japanese audiences, and as a result it achieved commercial success in Japan. Crash Bandicoot became the first installment in an eponymous series of games that would achieve critical and commercial success and establish Naughty Dog's reputation in the video game industry. A remastered version was released as a part of the Crash Bandicoot N. Sane Trilogy in 2017.

== Gameplay ==
An example of gameplay in Crash Bandicoot, illustrating the game's basic mechanics.

Crash Bandicoot is a platform game in which the player controls the titular character Crash, who is tasked with traversing 32 levels to defeat Doctor Neo Cortex and rescue Tawna. Most of the game takes place from a third-person perspective in which Crash moves into the screen. Certain levels that require him to flee from a rolling boulder reverse this perspective, while other levels are played from a traditional side-scrolling perspective. Crash is capable of moving in all directions; aside from moving left and right, he can move away from or toward the player, and the controls do not change with his position. His two primary forms of offense consist of jumping onto enemies and performing a spinning attack that kicks enemies off the screen. Kicked enemies can strike other enemies that are currently on-screen. Two levels involve Crash mounting and steering a wild boar that accelerates uncontrollably, requiring him to maneuver around obstacles and bypass enemies.

Scattered throughout each level are various types of crates that can be broken open by jumping on them, spinning into them, or knocking a kicked enemy into them. Most crates contain "Wumpa Fruit" that can grant Crash an extra life if 100 are collected. Some crates display an icon of what they contain. Crates displaying Aku Aku will grant Crash a floating Aku Aku mask that protects him from a single enemy or hazard. Collecting three masks consecutively grants Crash temporary invulnerability from all minor dangers. Crates marked with a "C" act as checkpoints where Crash can respawn after losing a life. Metallic crates marked with an exclamation point (!) cause an element of the surrounding environment to change if they are struck. Jumping on red TNT crates triggers a three-second timer that culminates in an explosion, while spinning into them causes an immediate detonation.

In roughly half of the game's levels, certain crates contain tokens in the likeness of Tawna, Cortex, or his assistant Nitrus Brio. Collecting three tokens of a single character will transport Crash to a "bonus round" where he must break crates in a side-scrolling area. Falling off the screen during a bonus round will not cost the player a life, but will send Crash back to the point in the level he was transported from. A few levels contain bonus rounds for two different characters. Tawna's bonus rounds are designed to be the easiest and most plentiful, and clearing one enables the player to save their game. Brio's bonus rounds are more difficult, featuring more TNT crates and requiring more precise jumps. Cortex's bonus rounds are the most difficult and are only included in two levels. Clearing Cortex's bonus round grants Crash a key that unlocks a secret level.

Clearing a level without losing a life and after breaking all of its crates (excluding crates in bonus rounds) will grant Crash a gem, which will be displayed by the level's name on the map screen. If the player clears a level in one life without breaking all the crates, a screen displays the amount of crates that were missed, and if the player loses any lives over the course of the level, they will instead be sent directly to the map screen upon the level's completion. While most gems are clear and colorless, six colored gems enable Crash to access areas in previous levels that he was unable to reach before. Collecting all 26 gems unlocks a special epilogue sequence accessible from the game's penultimate level.

== Plot ==
In a secluded archipelago 300 miles (480 km) west of Tasmania, the mad scientist Doctor Neo Cortex uses his "Evolvo-Ray" to genetically alter the local wildlife into an anthropomorphic army of soldiers for the purpose of world domination. Among these soldiers is an eastern barred bandicoot named Crash, whom Cortex selects to be the general of his army. The day before Crash is subjected to the "Cortex Vortex", a machine intended to brainwash him, he becomes attached to a female bandicoot named Tawna. Crash is rejected by the Cortex Vortex and is chased out of Cortex's castle, plummeting to the ocean below. (Note: Via a retcon introduced in Crash Bandicoot 4: It's About Time, it is revealed that the Cortex Vortex rejected Crash due to his future self accidentally destroying the Vortex's power source.) As Cortex prepares Tawna to be used in Crash's place, Crash washes up on a smaller island and resolves to rescue Tawna and defeat Cortex. He is aided in his mission by Aku Aku, a witch doctor spirit who acts as the guardian of the islands.

Crash undertakes a trek across the archipelago that spans several months. (Note: As confirmed by timestamps displayed on the Flashback Tapes in Crash Bandicoot 4: It's About Time, the date of Crash's subjection to the Cortex Vortex is September 9, 1996, while the escape of his sister Coco from Cortex's castle is dated July 24, 1997.) He traverses through a native village and defeats the hostile tribal chief Papu Papu. Cortex receives news of Crash's approach and dispatches his soldiers to dispose of Crash. After Crash defeats Ripper Roo, Koala Kong and Pinstripe Potoroo, he reaches Cortex's stronghold and faces Cortex's assistant Doctor Nitrus Brio, who battles Crash by ingesting a potion to transform himself into a giant green monster. Crash escapes to Cortex's airship, while Cortex boards a hovercraft and attacks Crash with a plasma gun as his castle burns behind them. Crash deflects Cortex's energy bolts against him and sends Cortex falling out of the sky. Tawna embraces Crash as the two ride Cortex's airship into the sunset.

In an alternate ending, Crash and Tawna escape Cortex's castle on a large bird, and an epilogue elaborates on the fates of the game's boss characters following Cortex's defeat and disappearance. Papu Papu sells the remains of Cortex's castle to a resort developer and uses the proceeds to open a plus-size clothing shop; Ripper Roo undergoes intense therapy and higher education, and authors a well-received book about the consequences of rapid evolution; Koala Kong moves to Hollywood and becomes a movie star; Pinstripe opens a sanitation company in Chicago and prepares for a gubernatorial campaign; and Brio rediscovers a love for bartending.

== Development ==
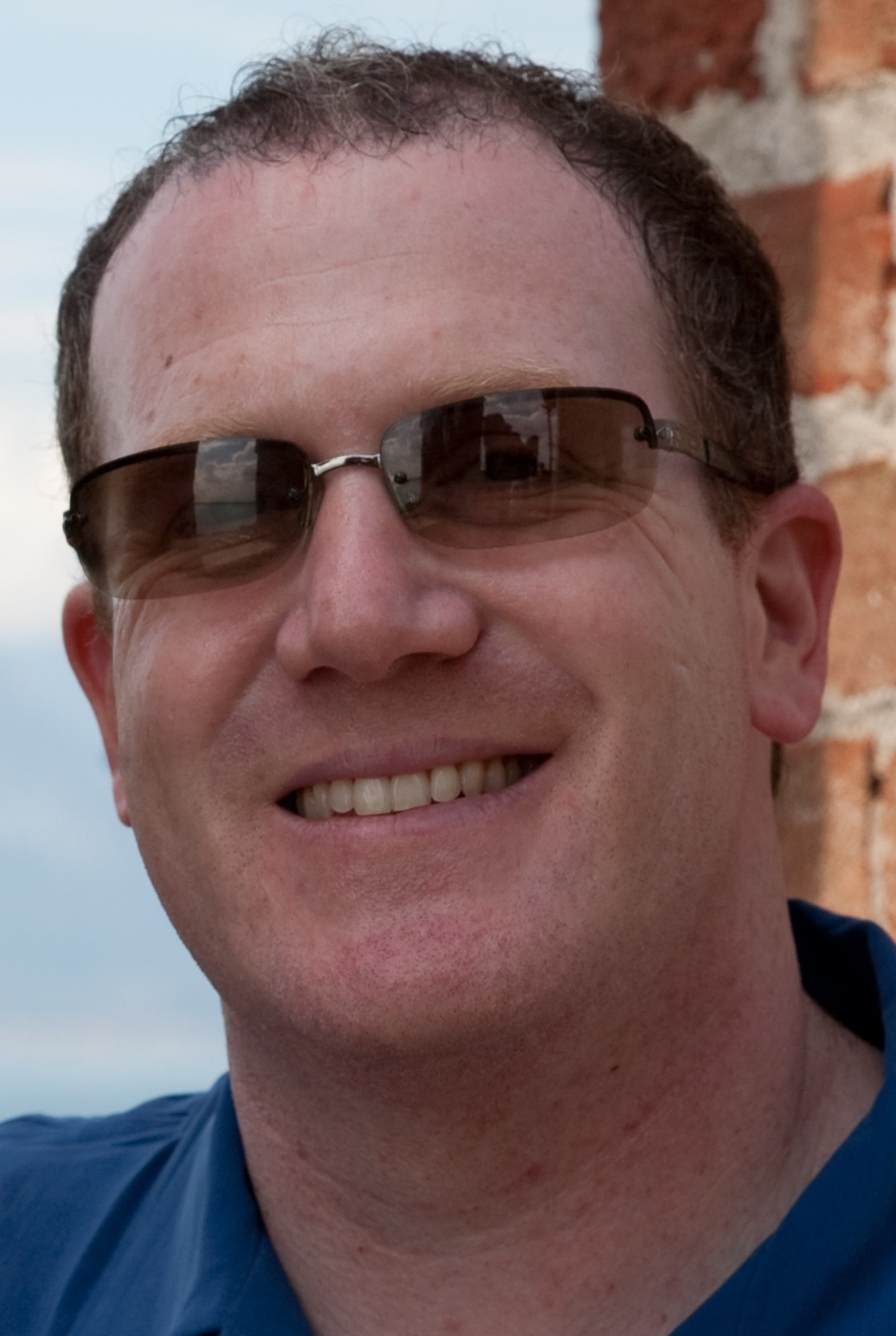
Andy Gavin (2009)

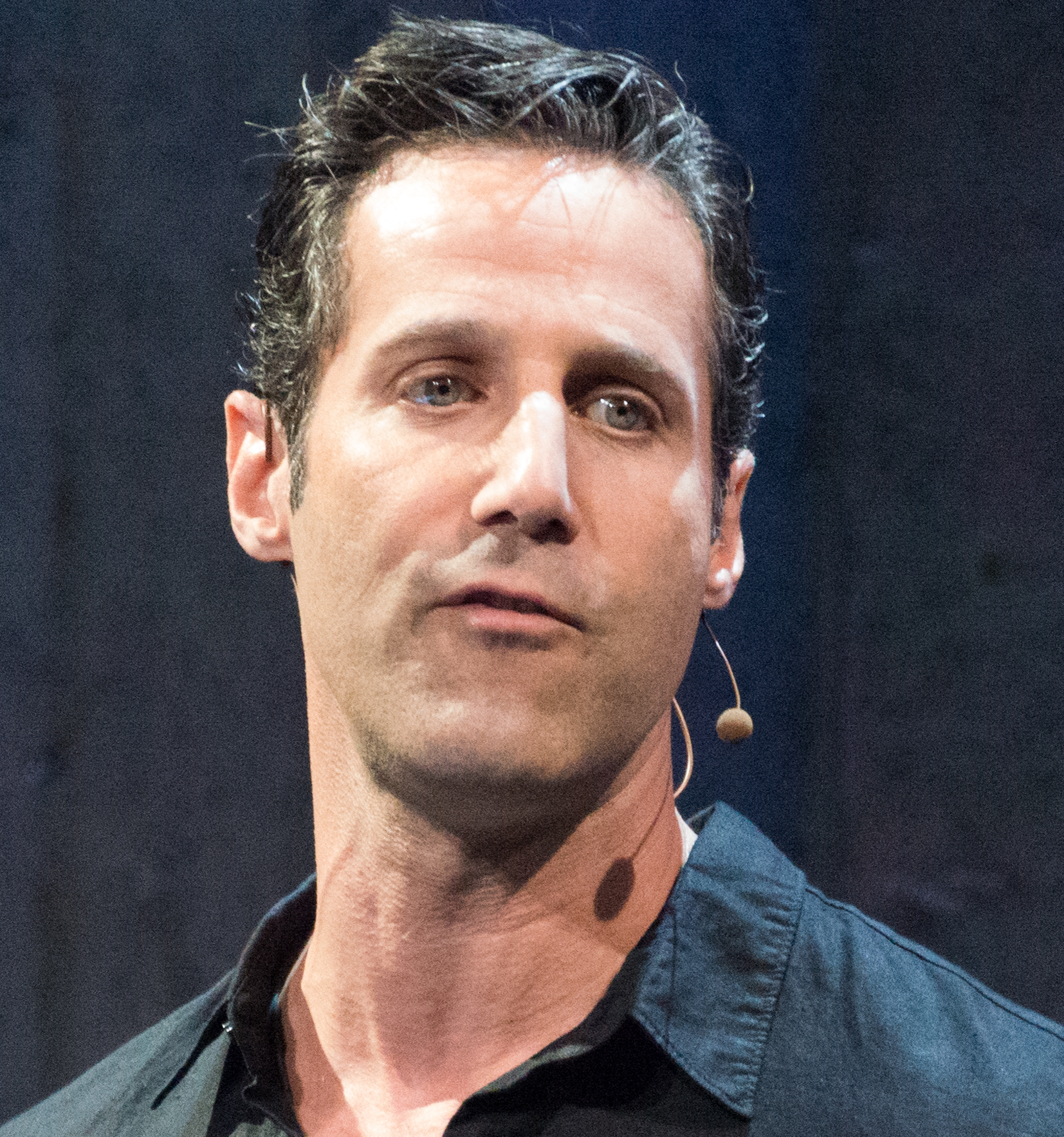
Jason Rubin (2015)

Gavin and Rubin co-created the concept for Crash Bandicoot during a cross-country trip from Boston to Los Angeles.

=== Conception ===
On January 5, 1994, MCA Inc. executive vice president Skip Paul and senior vice president Robert Biniaz established Universal Interactive Studios – a division for developing and publishing video games and interactive software – in response to a film industry trend of studios opening similar divisions. With this development, Universal Interactive was eager to acquire independent developers with the intention of eventually using them to create games and interactive movies based on Universal Pictures's existing franchises. At that year's Winter Consumer Electronics Show, Naughty Dog founders Andy Gavin and Jason Rubin displayed their latest game Way of the Warrior (1994) in search of a publisher; by chance, their booth was situated in close proximity to that of Universal Interactive, where Biniaz and Mark Cerny served as its representatives. A bidding war broke out between Universal Interactive, The 3DO Company, and Crystal Dynamics; Universal Interactive won the game's publishing rights by offering Naughty Dog a place on their lot and funding for three additional games, over which Naughty Dog would have creative freedom. This atypical agreement ensured that Naughty Dog could be locked in long enough to create a product that met Universal Interactive's expectations.

In August 1994, Gavin and Rubin began their move from Boston, Massachusetts to Los Angeles, California. Before leaving, Gavin and Rubin hired Dave Baggett, their first employee and a friend of Gavin's from the Massachusetts Institute of Technology; Baggett would not start working full-time until January 1995. During the trip, Gavin and Rubin studied arcade games intensely and noticed that racing, fighting and shooting games had begun making a transition into full 3D rendering. They initially considered a 3D beat 'em up based on Final Fight (1989) before recognizing that their favorite video game genre, the character-based action-platform game, had no 3D games at this point. The pair were especially fond of Donkey Kong Country (1994), and wondered how such a game could function in three dimensions. They figured that in a 3D perspective, the player would be constantly looking at the character's back rather than their profile, and thus jokingly called the hypothetical project "Sonic's Ass Game". Gavin and Rubin had a rough game theory designed by the time they reached Colorado, and they discarded a design for Al O. Saurus and Dinestein, a side-scrolling video game based on time travel and scientists genetically merged with dinosaurs.

Naughty Dog met with Cerny after moving into their new Universal City, California offices. The group unanimously liked the "Sonic's Ass Game" idea and discussed what video game system to develop it for. They decided that the 3DO, Atari Jaguar, Sega 32X, and Sega Saturn were unsatisfactory options due to poor sales and development units they deemed to be "clunky". The Nintendo 64 was merely rumored at the time, and Rubin observed in hindsight that although the console's polygon engine was intricate, its cartridge-based format would have been restrictive. The team ultimately chose to develop the game for Sony's PlayStation, considering the company and console "sexy" and taking into account the company's lack of an existing competing mascot character. After signing a developer agreement with Sony, Naughty Dog paid $35,000 for a PlayStation development unit and received the unit in September 1994. A development budget of $1.7 million was set for the game, and production began in October 1994. Rubin and Gavin were the 44th and 45th individual developers to sign onto development for the PlayStation, and according to Rubin's approximation, Crash Bandicoot was the 30th game to begin development for the PlayStation. David Siller was assigned as the game's producer by Universal Interactive due to his expertise in game design, despite Gavin and Rubin's reluctance toward having a producer.

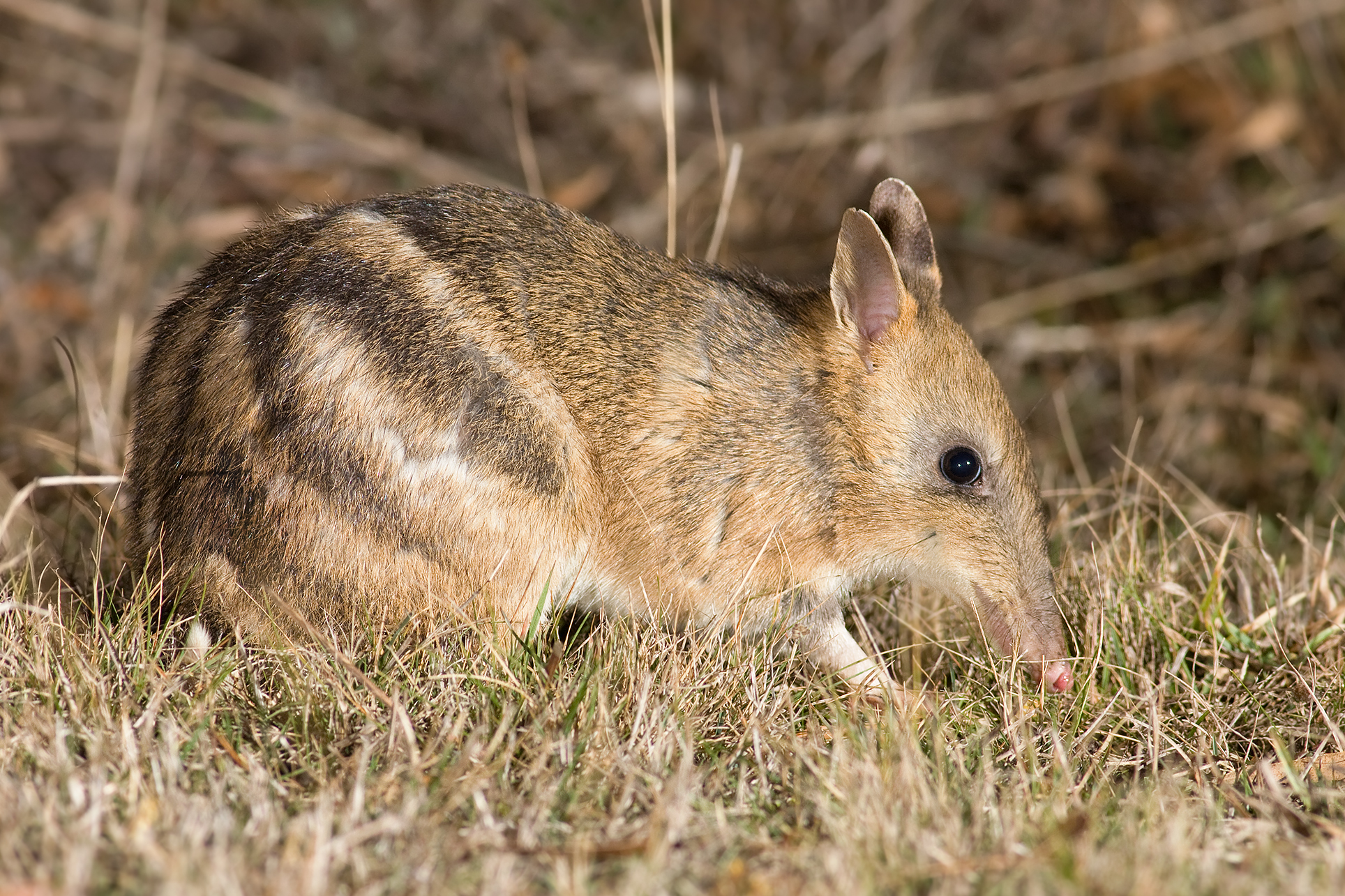
The eastern barred bandicoot was selected from a number of Tasmanian mammals as the basis for Crash Bandicoot because of its appeal and obscurity.

For the game's lead character, Naughty Dog wanted to do what Sega and Warner Bros. did while designing their respective characters – Sonic the Hedgehog and the Tasmanian Devil – and incorporate an existing animal that was appealing and obscure. The team purchased a field guide on Tasmanian mammals and selected the wombat, potoroo, and bandicoot as options. Gavin and Rubin went with "Willy the Wombat" as a temporary name for the starring character of the game. They never intended the name to be final due both to the name sounding "too dorky" and to the existence of a non-video game property of the same name; the name was also used by Hudson Soft for its Japan-exclusive Sega Saturn role-playing game Willy Wombat. While the character was effectively a bandicoot, he was still referred to as "Willy the Wombat" as a final name had not been formulated yet. The villain of the game was created while Gavin and Rubin were eating near Universal Interactive Studios. Gavin came up with the idea of an "evil genius villain with a big head" who was "all about his attitude and his minions". Rubin, having become fond of the animated television series Pinky and the Brain (1995–98), imagined a more malevolent version of the Brain with minions resembling the weasel characters in Who Framed Roger Rabbit (1988). After Gavin put on a voice depicting the attitude in mind for the character, he and Rubin instantly came up with the name "Doctor Neo Cortex".

Following their previous experience with Way of the Warrior, Gavin and Rubin recognized that a larger development team would be required to create their new game. As they settled into Universal Interactive's back lot, Gavin, Rubin and Baggett befriended Taylor Kurosaki, a visual effects artist who was working on the television series seaQuest DSV (1993–96) in the same building. Kurosaki, who had been using LightWave 3D in his work, was attracted by the opportunity to learn and use Alias PowerAnimator, and became Naughty Dog's next employee on January 5, 1995. Bob Rafei was also hired around this time, and was assigned as the game's art director.

=== Character and art design ===
In March 1995, Universal Interactive and Naughty Dog recruited Joe Pearson of Epoch Ink to aid in the visual aspect of production. Pearson in turn recommended that Charles Zembillas of American Exitus be brought on board as well. Pearson and Zembillas would meet with Naughty Dog weekly to create the characters and environments of the game. The main character's nature as a Tasmanian animal and the trope of evil geniuses like Cortex possessing island strongholds determined the game's mysterious island setting. Pearson created a concept bible that included detailed backstories for Crash and Cortex and established the game's setting as the remnants of the lost continent of Lemuria.

Crash Bandicoot was initially drawn as a "squat, hunkered-down character" (left) by Charles Zembillas, who later incorporated traits from a drawing by Joe Pearson (middle) into Crash's final design (right).

Zembillas' initial sketches of Crash depicted him as a "squat, hunkered-down" character. After Pearson drew a version of Crash that was leaner, had a larger nose and wore a Zorro-like mask, Zembillas began drawing Crash as "a little more manic and insane". Naughty Dog decided early on that there would be no connection between a real animal and Crash's final design, which would instead be determined "51% by technical and visual necessity and 49% by inspiration". Gavin determined Crash's fur color by creating a list of popular characters and their colors, and then making a list of earthly background possibilities (such as forests, deserts, beaches, etc.). Colors that would not look good on the screen were strictly outlawed, such as red, which would bleed on older televisions. Orange was selected by process of elimination. Crash's head was made large and neckless to counter the low resolution of the screen and allow his facial expressions to be discernible. Rubin noted the increased difficulty in turning Crash's head with this type of design. Small details such as gloves, spots on Crash's back and a light-colored chest were added to help the player determine what side of Crash was visible based on color. Crash was not given a tail or any flappy straps of clothing due to the PlayStation's inability to properly display such pixels without flickering. The length of Crash's pants was shortened to keep his ankles from flickering as they would with longer pants. Crash was originally written as a speaking character who, as a result of his subjection to the Cortex Vortex, communicated in a series of bizarre non sequiturs derived from classic literature and pop culture. The team ultimately decided that Crash would be mute because they considered past voices for video game characters to be "lame, negative, and distract[ing] from identification with them".

Gavin and Rubin described Cortex to Zembillas as "[having] a huge head but a tiny body, he's a mad scientist, and he dresses a bit like a Nazi from The Jetsons (1962—63)". Gavin owns Zembillas' original ink sketches of Crash, while Rubin owns the original sketches of Cortex. Cortex was originally envisioned as a self-aware video game character who was bothered by the clichés he embodied and addressed the audience throughout the game. This aspect was removed after Naughty Dog decided that cutscenes would disrupt the game's pacing. Cortex's right-hand man Doctor Nitrus Brio, originally named "Needy Brio", was developed as a foil.

Aku Aku was originally conceived as an elderly human character who communicated through mumbles only intelligible to Crash, in a manner similar to the dynamic between C-3PO and R2-D2 of the Star Wars franchise. His name originates from a Polynesian restaurant located near the Alewife station, which featured giant tiki statues out front. The Aku Aku masks that protect Crash were a late addition intended to balance the gameplay's difficulty. Because Cerny's initial suggestion of a translucent shield would have been technically impractical, the floating masks were created as a low-polygon alternative.

The boss characters Ripper Roo and Papu Papu created opportunities for Naughty Dog's animators to implement such features as overlapping action and jiggling fat respectively; the former also served as a humorous demonstration of the dangers of the Cortex Vortex. Pinstripe Potoroo and Tawna (originally named "Karmen") were respectively inspired by The Godfather (1972) and actress Pamela Anderson, though Tawna's design was scaled back to be less provocative. The Komodo Brothers and Tiny Tiger, who would appear as boss characters in future games in the series, were originally created for the first game.

On creating the levels for the game, Pearson first sketched each environment, designing and creating additional individual elements later. Pearson aimed for an organic, overgrown look to the game and worked to completely avoid straight lines and 90-degree corners. A Naughty Dog artist sketched every single background object in the game before it was modeled. Naughty Dog's artists were tasked with making the best use of textures and reducing the amount of geometry. Dark and light elements were juxtaposed to create visual interest and separate geometry. The artists would squint when sketching, texturing, and playing the levels to make sure they could be played by light value alone. They ensured to use color correctly by choosing mutually accentuating colors as the theme for the "Lost City" and "Sunset Vista" levels. The interior of Cortex's castle was designed to reflect his twisted mind. According to Rubin, the artists worked on the visuals for eight months before any game code was written.

=== Graphics ===
It was that opening sequence, when Crash pulls his flat face out of the sand, shakes it off, looks confused, leaps up, looks at the camera and does his great big goofy smile that SOLD Crash as a character. No 2D game could afford the art, and no other 3D game had the facial animation that our vertex system brought. And thus the main character transformed from emotionless "vehicles" to an emotive friend.

— Jason Rubin, on vertex animation's impact on Crash Bandicoot's presentation

Production on Crash Bandicoot used $100,000 Silicon Graphics-based workstations with an IRIX-based tool pipeline rather than the $3,000 personal computers that were the standard at the time. The PlayStation had a 512 × 240 video mode which used video memory normally reserved for textures, but was also efficient in rendering shaded polygons without texture. Rubin pointed out that since the polygons on the characters were just a few pixels in size, shaded characters would look better than textured ones. Thus, polygon counts were emphasized over textures, which allowed the programmers to bypass the PlayStation's lack of texture correction or polygon clipping. To make the game look like an animated cartoon, vertex animation was implemented rather than the standard skeletal animation with "one-joint" weighting, allowing the programmers to use the more sophisticated three-to-four-joint weighting available in Alias PowerAnimator. Because the PlayStation was unable to calculate this in real time, the location of each vertex was stored in each frame at 30 frames per second. Gavin, Baggett, and Cerny attempted to invent a compressor in assembly language for this manner of animation; Cerny's version, although the most complicated, was the most successful of the three. The vertex animation method allowed Crash to display a much wider range of facial expressions than competing video game characters at the time. Rubin created Crash's model with 532 polygons and animated all the game's characters. Because Cortex's legs were too short for his game model to walk properly, he was kept stationary in many of his appearances.

To obtain the game's vast and detailed graphics, Rubin, Gavin, and Baggett researched visibility calculation in video games that followed Doom and concluded that extending the visibility precomputations would allow the game to render a larger number of polygons. Following experimentation in free-roaming camera control, the team settled with a branching rail camera that would follow along next to, behind, or in front of Crash, generally looking at him, thus moving on a "track" through the world. Since only 900 polygons could be visible on screen at a time, parts of the game's landscapes are hidden by trees, cliffs, walls, and twists and turns in the environment. Gavin created procedural textures to overcome the lack of available texture memory. Each level in Crash Bandicoot contains six to eight megabytes of textures. Baggett created two-way compressors that would reduce the 128-megabyte levels down to 12 megabytes and allow them to be compatible with the PlayStation's two-megabyte random access memory. The levels proved to be so large that the first test level created could not be loaded into PowerAnimator and had to be cut up into sixteen pieces. Each piece took about ten minutes to load on a 256-megabyte machine. To remedy the situation, Baggett created the DLE ("Dave's Level Editor"), a level design tool with which RGB values from a top-down map of a level are used to assemble level environments, with a succession of ten to fifteen layers from Adobe Photoshop indicating how the level's portions have to be combined. Rafei created nearly all of the game's backgrounds, and the textures were created by Rafei and Charlotte Francis.

A pair of cutscenes featuring hand-drawn animation were produced by Universal Animation Studios to serve as the game's intro and outro, as well as act as source material for a potential animated series if the game was well-received and commercially successful. The hand-drawn cutscenes were dropped after Sony Computer Entertainment picked up Crash Bandicoot for publication, as Sony desired to push the PlayStation's 3D polygonal graphics. The cutscenes were uploaded to YouTube by Siller in 2015.

=== Level design ===
Naughty Dog made the early decision to design Crash Bandicoot as a classic action-based platform game as opposed to an open-world exploration-based game in order to fully render its environments in three dimensions. To code the characters and gameplay, Gavin and Baggett created the programming language "Game Oriented Object LISP" (GOOL) using LISP syntax. The first two test levels created for the game were not integrated into the final version because they were too open and had too many polygons. During the summer of 1995, the team focused on creating levels that were both functional and fun, and used the Cortex factory levels to experiment on this goal; the mechanical setting allowed the team to forego the complex and organic forest designs and distill the two-axis gameplay. The first two functional levels, "Heavy Machinery" and "Generator Room", utilized 2.5D gameplay and featured basic techniques previously used in Donkey Kong Country, such as steam vents, drop platforms, bouncy pads, heated pipes and enemy characters that would move back and forth, all arranged in increasingly difficult combinations as the level progresses. Crash's jumping and spinning attacks were refined in these two levels. The "Cortex Power" level incorporates the original "Sonic's ass" point of view (behind the character and over his shoulder) featured in the two test levels. After working on those three levels, the first operational jungle-themed level, "Jungle Rollers", was created from pieces of the failed first test level arranged into a corridor between trees. Afterward, two to three levels would be developed for each environmental theme created, with the first level featuring an introductory set of challenges and later levels adding new obstacles (such as dropping and moving platforms in the second jungle-themed level) to increase the difficulty. The level layouts and gameplay mechanics were generally not drawn out on paper beforehand and were largely the result of trial and error by the Naughty Dog team. Siller created sketches and summaries to document the result, but later used the documents to claim credit for the game's designs and mechanics.

After developing the core gameplay, Naughty Dog realized that there were many empty areas in the game due to the PlayStation's inability to generate multiple enemies on-screen. In an attempt to remedy this, they created the "Wumpa Fruit" item in three dimensions by means of a series of textures, but this was not considered sufficiently exciting. On a Saturday in January 1996, Gavin and Rubin conceived the crate mechanic, reasoning that crates would be made up of a low amount of polygons and multiple types of which could be combined to interesting effect. Gavin coded the crates while Rubin modeled some basic crates as well as an exploding TNT crate and drew quick textures. The first crates were integrated into the game six hours later, and many more were placed during the following days. By February 1996 over 20 levels had been created which were in various stages of completion.

Kurosaki designed three quarters of the game's levels. One of the last levels he created was "Stormy Ascent", which was roughly four times longer than the other levels. Although Stormy Ascent was fully playable, Naughty Dog deemed the level too difficult and lacked time to make it easier, and decided to cut it from the game before submitting the gold master to Sony. Because removing the level completely was considered too risky, Stormy Ascent was left hidden within the disc and accessible to play via GameShark. Stormy Ascent was later recreated by Vicarious Visions and released as downloadable content for the Crash Bandicoot N. Sane Trilogy on July 20, 2017.

=== Audio ===
The music for Crash Bandicoot was a last-minute aspect added to the game before its showing at E3. Siller proposed that rather than conventional music, Gavin could create an "urban chaotic symphony" where random sound effects, such as bird vocalizations, vehicle horns, grunts, and flatulence, would be combined. After Naughty Dog rejected this proposal, Siller introduced them to the music production company Mutato Muzika and its founder Mark Mothersbaugh. According to Siller, Mutato Muzika joined production after speaking with Siller without Naughty Dog being consulted, which resulted in an angry confrontation between Rubin and Siller. Cerny removed Siller from production following this incident. The music was composed by Josh Mancell and produced by Baggett. Mancell's initial tracks for the game were manic and hyperactive before Baggett directed him toward more ambient compositions. Following a period of experimentation with ambience that received a mixed reaction from Universal's producers, Mancell created the score for the game's eighth level "Hog Wild", which he cited as a turning point in both his approach to the soundtrack and the feedback he received. As Mancell explained, "People laughed at it, and it started to feel as if there was more of a positive reaction. It didn't sound like Mario music, but it sounded like its own version of that; more animated, more character-driven".

The sound effects were created by Mike Gollom, Ron Horwitz and Kevin Spears of Universal Sound Studios. The sound of Ripper Roo's maniacal chortling is a sample of a hyena (voiced by Dallas McKennon) from Lady and the Tramp (1955). The voice acting was provided by Brendan O'Brien, who came in contact with Rubin through Pearson and recorded his dialogue below the Universal Studios Lot's Hitchcock Theater.

== Marketing and release ==
In September 1995, Andy Gavin and Taylor Kurosaki, using the latter's connections to the seaQuest DSV crew, spent two days in the series' editing bay creating a two-minute demo film and gave it to a friend who would show it to Sony Computer Entertainment. Sony appreciated the demonstration, but internal management issues meant that Sony would not sign an agreement with Universal Interactive to publish the game until March 1996. While preparing for the game's demonstration at the 1996 E3, the team decided to finally rename the title character "Crash Bandicoot", a name credited to Kurosaki and Dave Baggett. The character's name was based on his species and the visceral reaction to his destruction of boxes. The names "Dash", "Smash", and "Bash" were also considered. Universal Interactive's marketing director contested the name and objected to the character Tawna for her perceived sexist nature. While Naughty Dog was able to retain the "Crash Bandicoot" name after threatening to leave production, they chose to omit Tawna from subsequent entries in the series based both on this experience and to appease the desire of Sony's Japanese marketing team for a more girlish female supporting character.

Universal Interactive, in an attempt to take credit for Crash Bandicoot, notified Naughty Dog that they were not allowed to attend E3. In addition, leaked copies of the temporary box cover and press materials for E3 omitted the Naughty Dog logo, in violation of the contract between Naughty Dog and Universal Interactive. In response to this provocation, Jason Rubin drafted and printed 1,000 copies of a document entitled "Naughty Dog, creator and developer of Crash Bandicoot" to hand out in front of the Crash Bandicoot display at E3. Beforehand, Rubin passed out the flyers "for review" to Universal Interactive, angering Biniaz. Crash Bandicoot was first shown at E3 in May 1996 and was met with enthusiastic reactions. Crash Bandicoot was displayed at the front of Sony's booth at E3, replacing their original choice of Twisted Metal.

Crash Bandicoot had a marketing budget of $6 million. Ami Matsumura-Blaire of Sony served as the marketing manager for Crash Bandicoot and worked in collaboration with Erik Moe and Chris Graves of TBWA\Chiat\Day to create the game's advertising campaign. Moe and Graves, recognizing that Sony sought to establish itself as a challenger to Nintendo, conceived the idea of Crash Bandicoot inspiring a crazed fan to create a Crash outfit and harass Mario from Nintendo's parking lot. The team set a rule against directly insinuating that the video game character and the costumed person in the advertisement were the same individual, as the two entities had different personalities. As the marketing team went to Seattle to film the commercial, they created smaller teasers depicting the fan's journey to Nintendo. The commercial was shot near a Nintendo building, but not the main Nintendo headquarters, which Matsumura-Blaire felt aligned with the campaign's humor; she remarked that "it would totally make sense that this guy hadn't had done his homework and [had] mistakenly gone to the wrong building". An additional commercial featuring Sega was considered but never created due to increasing expenses.

The development of Crash Bandicoot spanned a total of 18 months. It was released in North America on September 9, 1996, and in Europe on November 8, 1996.

=== Japanese distribution ===
In preparation for presenting Crash Bandicoot to Sony's Japanese division, Gavin spent a month studying anime and manga, reading English-language books on the subject, watching Japanese films and observing competitive characters in video games. Upon Naughty Dog's first meeting with the executives of Sony Computer Entertainment Japan, the executives handed Naughty Dog a document that compared Crash with Mario and Nights into Dreams. Although Crash was rated favorably in the graphics department, the main character and the game's non-Japanese "heritage" were seen as weak points. The renderings of the character made specifically for the meeting by Francis also proved unimpressive. During a break following the initial meeting, Gavin approached Francis and gave her fifteen minutes to adjust Crash's facial features. Sony Japan bought Crash for Japanese distribution after being shown the modified printout.

Sony producer Shuhei Yoshida, convinced that the game was excessively challenging and that Japanese players preferred a more manageable experience, suggested that the game's difficulty be lowered for the Japanese market. To compose his argument, Yoshida created charts and data comparing Crash Bandicoot to Donkey Kong Country in terms of enemy variety and the amount of new elements in each level. Naughty Dog received his feedback constructively in a meeting in which he presented his findings and they adjusted the game's Japanese version accordingly. Adjustments included shortening levels such as "The High Road", changing the size of platforms in the levels "Upstream" and "Up the Creek", and Aku Aku explaining the game's mechanics via pop-up text instructions in the first few levels.

The localization hid the game's American origins as much as possible, featuring no roman letters for instance. Some of the game's music was changed at the request of Sony's Japanese division to be less "edgy". A screen in which Crash is struck by falling crates the player had missed in a level was altered after the Japanese children testing the game reported being disturbed and upset by the image.

The Japanese television advertising campaign for Crash Bandicoot included a dance performed by a costumed Crash Bandicoot mascot; the dance was created by Sony Japan's marketing manager Megumi Hosoya. The advertisement's background music became the opening theme for the Japanese versions of subsequent Crash Bandicoot games, and the success of the campaign influenced Naughty Dog to incorporate the dance into the games. Crash Bandicoot was released in Japan on December 9, 1996. It was later re-released as part of The Best for Family range on May 28, 1998, and the PSOne Books release followed on October 12, 2001.

== Reception ==
Reception

Aggregate score
Aggregator	Score
GameRankings	80%

Review scores
Publication	Score
Computer and Video Games	4/5
Electronic Gaming Monthly	8.5/10, 8.5/10, 8.5/10, 8/10
Game Informer	9/10
Game Players	8.8/10
GameFan	100/100, 99/100, 99/100
GameRevolution	B
GameSpot	6.8/10
Hyper	90%
IGN	7.5/10
Next Generation	3/5
PlayStation Official Magazine – UK	9/10
PlayStation Pro	9/10

Awards
Publication	Award
Electronic Gaming Monthly	Game of the Month
GameFan	Game of the Month

Crash Bandicoot received generally favorable reviews from critics, with Electronic Gaming Monthly and GameFan rewarding it the "Game of the Month" title. Reviewers widely considered the gameplay to be standard for its genre, though some nevertheless regarded it to be enjoyable and polished; E. Storm of GameFan, who gave both the game and its competitor Super Mario 64 perfect scores, determined that "Mario 64 is a perfect action/adventure and that Crash is a perfect action/platform". However, Zach Meston of GameSpot and a reviewer for Next Generation were less forgiving, with Meston deriding the gameplay as "flat as roadkill on a four-lane highway", and the Next Generation reviewer declaring the game to be "the single most derivative game to ever hit a console". While the linearity of the levels and lack of room for exploration was a source of disappointment, the shifting perspectives between levels were acknowledged as interesting, although the fixed camera caused reviewers to experience difficulty in judging jumps. The gameplay variety provided by these altered perspectives as well as the bonus rounds and gems was appreciated. The game's difficulty level was commended as challenging without becoming frustrating, though Tommy Glide of GamePro and Dan Tsu of Electronic Gaming Monthly respectively felt that the bosses and enemies were easy to dispatch. While Nebojsa Radakovic of GameRevolution applauded the game's controls, critics generally deemed them to be satisfactory if somewhat sluggish. A reviewer for Official UK PlayStation Magazine considered the save points to be "a little misplaced", pointing out a portion of the second island in which there is no save point for three levels.

The visuals were singled out for praise, with critics declaring them to be the best yet seen on a fifth-generation console. Particular notice was given to the Gouraud shaded textures, colorful and detailed backgrounds, lighting and shadows, smooth animation, and special effects such as flames and water transparency. However, Radakovic felt that the shading was "almost too well done", claiming that it made the game more difficult by making the pits appear to be shadows and vice versa. The game's visual style was compared to a cartoon, with Glide noting that Crash's death animations "lend a Warner Brothers flair". Crash was welcomed as a character for his quirky design and mannerisms, although Glide considered the enemy designs to be tame.

Reactions to the audio were generally positive. E. Storm praised the quality and production of the PCM soundtrack, claiming that "When you hop on the hog you'll wanna squeal "yee-haw!" and when you're in the middle of Castle Machinery you'll feel like friggin' George Jetson". Glide commended the sound effects as "excellent", though he felt that the game's "subtle, unintrusive music may come off as silly to some". Dan Toose of Hyper complimented the sound design as adding to the game's cartoonish presentation.

In 2009, James Stephanie Sterling of Destructoid stated that the game has aged poorly since its initial release due to a lack of support for DualShock thumbsticks, a poor camera, and substandard jumping and spinning controls. In 2015, the staff of Fact ranked Mancell's score as the 69th greatest video game soundtrack, describing it as "the best Funky house riffs this side of Crazy Cousins". In 2018, the game was ranked #179 in GamesTM's list of "200 Greatest Games of All Time".

== Sales ==
Crash Bandicoot was a commercial success. In the United States, the game was the second-highest renting PlayStation title at Blockbuster Video in its opening month before topping the chart the following month and staying within the top ten for two subsequent months. The game sold over 1 million units worldwide in 1996, including 640,000 copies in the United States and Europe, becoming the fourth and fifth best-selling PlayStation game of 1996 in the United States and Europe, respectively. In Australia, the game sold more than 100,000 copies in its first month of release.

Crash Bandicoot's success continued into 1997, in which it was the tenth best selling video game in the United States. In May 1997, Crash Bandicoot became the first non-Japanese game to receive a "Gold Prize" in Japan for sales of over 500,000 units, and in September 1997, it was inducted into the Greatest Hits budget range.

By late February 1998, its sales in the United States reached 1.5 million units, while Japanese and European sales reached 610,000 and 725,000 units, respectively. Sales continued through 1998: PC Data tracked 771,809 domestic sales of Crash Bandicoot for the year, which drew $16 million in revenue and made it the United States' 10th-best-selling PlayStation release of the year. The game spent nearly two years on the NPD TRSTS top 20 PlayStation sales charts before finally dropping off in September 1998. In Australia, it was the fourth best-selling home console game of 1998.

At the 1999 Milia festival in Cannes, Crash Bandicoot took home a "Gold" prize for revenues above €17 million in the European Union during 1998. By February 1999, 4.49 million copies of Crash Bandicoot had been shipped to retailers worldwide. As of November 2003, Crash Bandicoot has sold over 6.8 million units worldwide, making it one of the best selling PlayStation video games of all time and the highest selling ranked on sales in the United States.

== Legacy ==
Following the release of Crash Bandicoot, Naughty Dog developed and released two sequels, Crash Bandicoot 2: Cortex Strikes Back (1997) and Crash Bandicoot: Warped (1998), and the kart racing game Crash Team Racing (1999), all to critical acclaim and commercial success. The Crash Bandicoot series established Naughty Dog's reputation in the video game industry, and they found further success with the Jak and Daxter, Uncharted and The Last of Us series; Naughty Dog later recreated a level of Crash Bandicoot within its 2016 title Uncharted 4: A Thief's End. After the publishing deal between Universal Interactive and Sony ended in 2000, several more games were developed for the Crash Bandicoot series by different developers, which received mixed reviews.

Crash Bandicoot influenced the development of Rayman 2: The Great Escape (1999). Rayman 2 was originally developed as a two-dimensional side-scrolling platform game, but Ubisoft reconsidered the project after seeing Crash Bandicoot and the possibilities offered by three-dimensional platforming, leading the team to redesign the game in 3D. Rayman creator Michel Ancel later recalled that the popularity of three-dimensional games such as Crash Bandicoot and Super Mario 64 convinced Ubisoft that the series needed to make the transition to 3D.

Crash Bandicoot was released on the PlayStation Network in the United States on December 4, 2006, and in Europe on June 22, 2007. During E3 2016, Sony announced that as part of the series' 20th anniversary, the first three games of the series would be remastered by Vicarious Visions in a compilation titled Crash Bandicoot N. Sane Trilogy, which was released for the PlayStation 4 on June 30, 2017.

Dark Horse Books reprinted the original developer's bible for Crash Bandicoot as a hardcover publication titled The Crash Bandicoot Files: How Willy the Wombat Sparked Marsupial Mania, which was released on March 27, 2018.

In April 2024, a prototypical port of the game for the Sega Saturn was created by homebrew developer Frogbull, with a playable build being revealed in August.
