= List of Naughty Dog video games =

Video games developed by Naughty Dog

Naughty Dog is an American video game developer that was founded in 1984 by Andy Gavin and Jason Rubin. Based in Santa Monica, California, Naughty Dog was originally known as JAM Software until 1989, and began producing games for the Apple II system. Their first release, Math Jam, was an educational game for the system which Gavin and Rubin self-published in 1986. The following year, Jam developed the skiing game Ski Crazed, which was published by Michigan-based company Baudville for the Apple II. The partnership with Baudville continued for Dream Zone, an adventure game released for the Apple IIGS as well as the Amiga, Atari ST and DOS in 1988, before they left to work with Electronic Arts on Keef the Thief and Rings of Power. After a brief hiatus, Way of the Warrior was released for the 3DO in 1994, before Naughty Dog partnered with Sony Computer Entertainment, by whom they were later acquired in 2001.

Naughty Dog is known for developing the Crash Bandicoot series for Sony's PlayStation console. After launching the series with the first title in 1996, Naughty Dog developed sequels Crash Bandicoot 2: Cortex Strikes Back and Crash Bandicoot: Warped, as well as spin-off Crash Team Racing, before their partnership with distributor Universal Interactive Studios ended. Two years after the release of Crash Team Racing, Naughty Dog returned in 2001 with a title for the PlayStation 2, Jak and Daxter: The Precursor Legacy, which spawned the Jak and Daxter series, it includes the sequels Jak II and Jak 3 and the spin-off Jak X: Combat Racing. The developer's next series was Uncharted, which consists of four main titles—Drake's Fortune (2007), Among Thieves (2009), Drake's Deception (2011), and A Thief's End (2016), and a standalone expansion, The Lost Legacy, (2017). Naughty Dog's most recent new intellectual property is The Last of Us, released for the PlayStation 3 in 2013 and for the PlayStation 4 as The Last of Us Remastered in 2014: a downloadable expansion, Left Behind, was released for the PlayStation 3 in 2014; a sequel, The Last of Us Part II, was released in 2020; a remake, The Last of Us Part I, was released for PlayStation 5 in 2022, and for Windows in March 2023.

== Video games ==
Game	Details
Math Jam Original release date(s): 1986	Release years by system: 1986 – Apple II
Math Jam Original release date(s): 1986	Notes: Developed under the name JAM Software.; Education game, published independently by JAM Software.
Ski Crazed Original release date(s): October 1987	Release years by system: 1987 – Apple II
Ski Crazed Original release date(s): October 1987	Notes: Developed under the name JAM Software; Sports game published by Baudville
Dream Zone Original release date(s): 1988	Release years by system: 1988 – Apple IIGS, DOS, Amiga, Atari ST
Dream Zone Original release date(s): 1988	Notes: Developed under the name JAM Software; Adventure game published by Baudville
Keef the Thief Original release date(s): 1989	Release years by system: 1989 – Amiga, Apple IIGS, DOS
Keef the Thief Original release date(s): 1989	Notes: First game developed under the name Naughty Dog; Role-playing game published by Electronic Arts
Rings of Power Original release date(s): January 1992	Release years by system: 1992 – Sega Mega Drive/Genesis
Rings of Power Original release date(s): January 1992	Notes: First console game developed by Naughty Dog; Role-playing game published by Electronic Arts
Way of the Warrior Original release date(s): August 30, 1994	Release years by system: 1994 – 3DO
Way of the Warrior Original release date(s): August 30, 1994	Notes: Fighting game published by Universal Interactive Studios
Crash Bandicoot Original release dates: NA: September 9, 1996; PAL: November 1, 1996; AU: January 30, 1998	Release years by system: 1996 – PlayStation; 2007 – PlayStation 3, PlayStation Portable; 2012 – PlayStation Vita
Crash Bandicoot Original release dates: NA: September 9, 1996; PAL: November 1, 1996; AU: January 30, 1998	Notes: First game in Crash Bandicoot series; Platform game published by Sony Computer Entertainment; PSOne Classic available on the PlayStation Store to download for the PlayStation 3, PlayStation Vita and PlayStation Portable; A remake is included in the Crash Bandicoot N. Sane Trilogy, developed by Vicarious Visions for Nintendo Switch, PlayStation 4, Windows, and Xbox One.
Crash Bandicoot 2: Cortex Strikes Back Original release dates: NA: November 5, 1997; EU: December 6, 1997	Release years by system: 1997 – PlayStation; 2007 – PlayStation 3, PlayStation Portable; 2012 – PlayStation Vita
Crash Bandicoot 2: Cortex Strikes Back Original release dates: NA: November 5, 1997; EU: December 6, 1997	Notes: Platform game published by Sony Computer Entertainment; PSOne Classic available on the PlayStation Store to download for the PlayStation 3, PlayStation Vita and PlayStation Portable; A remake is included in Crash Bandicoot N. Sane Trilogy, developed by Vicarious Visions for Nintendo Switch, PlayStation 4, Windows, and Xbox One.
Crash Bandicoot: Warped Original release dates: NA: November 4, 1998; EU: December 5, 1998	Release years by system: 1998 – PlayStation; 2008 – PlayStation 3, PlayStation Portable; 2012 – PlayStation Vita
Crash Bandicoot: Warped Original release dates: NA: November 4, 1998; EU: December 5, 1998	Notes: Platform game published by Sony Computer Entertainment; PSOne Classic available on the PlayStation Store to download for the PlayStation 3, PlayStation Vita and PlayStation Portable; A remake is included in Crash Bandicoot N. Sane Trilogy, developed by Vicarious Visions for Nintendo Switch, PlayStation 4, Windows, and Xbox One.
Crash Team Racing Original release dates: NA: September 30, 1999; EU: October 19, 1999	Release years by system: 1999 – PlayStation; 2007 – PlayStation 3, PlayStation Portable; 2012 – PlayStation Vita
Crash Team Racing Original release dates: NA: September 30, 1999; EU: October 19, 1999	Notes: Naughty Dog's final entry in the Crash Bandicoot series, before their partnership with distributor Universal Interactive Studios ended; Racing game published by Sony Computer Entertainment; PSOne Classic available on the PlayStation Store to download for the PlayStation 3, PlayStation Vita and PlayStation Portable; A remaster of the game, titled Crash Team Racing Nitro-Fueled, was released on PlayStation 4, Xbox One and Nintendo Switch in 2019.
Jak and Daxter: The Precursor Legacy Original release dates: NA: December 3, 2001; EU: December 7, 2001; AU: December 7, 2001	Release years by system: 2001 – PlayStation 2
Jak and Daxter: The Precursor Legacy Original release dates: NA: December 3, 2001; EU: December 7, 2001; AU: December 7, 2001	Notes: First game in the Jak and Daxter series, following Naughty Dog's acquisition by Sony Computer Entertainment; Platform game published by Sony Computer Entertainment
Jak II Original release dates: NA: October 14, 2003; AU: October 15, 2003; EU: October 17, 2003	Release years by system: 2003 – PlayStation 2
Jak II Original release dates: NA: October 14, 2003; AU: October 15, 2003; EU: October 17, 2003	Notes: Platform game published by Sony Computer Entertainment
Jak 3 Original release dates: NA: November 9, 2004; AU: November 26, 2004; EU: November 26, 2004	Release years by system: 2004 – PlayStation 2
Jak 3 Original release dates: NA: November 9, 2004; AU: November 26, 2004; EU: November 26, 2004	Notes: Platform game published by Sony Computer Entertainment
Jak X: Combat Racing Original release dates: NA: October 18, 2005; AU: October 26, 2005; EU: November 4, 2005	Release years by system: 2005 – PlayStation 2
Jak X: Combat Racing Original release dates: NA: October 18, 2005; AU: October 26, 2005; EU: November 4, 2005	Notes: Naughty Dog's final entry in the Jak and Daxter series; Racing game published by Sony Computer Entertainment
Uncharted: Drake's Fortune Original release dates: NA: November 19, 2007; AU: December 6, 2007; EU: December 7, 2007	Release years by system: 2007 – PlayStation 3
Uncharted: Drake's Fortune Original release dates: NA: November 19, 2007; AU: December 6, 2007; EU: December 7, 2007	Notes: First game in the Uncharted series; Action-adventure shooter platform game published by Sony Computer Entertainment
Uncharted 2: Among Thieves Original release dates: NA: October 13, 2009; AU: October 15, 2009; EU: October 16, 2009	Release years by system: 2009 – PlayStation 3
Uncharted 2: Among Thieves Original release dates: NA: October 13, 2009; AU: October 15, 2009; EU: October 16, 2009	Notes: Action-adventure shooter platform game published by Sony Computer Entertainment
Uncharted 3: Drake's Deception Original release dates: NA: November 1, 2011; EU: November 2, 2011; AU: November 3, 2011	Release years by system: 2011 – PlayStation 3
Uncharted 3: Drake's Deception Original release dates: NA: November 1, 2011; EU: November 2, 2011; AU: November 3, 2011	Notes: Action-adventure shooter platform game published by Sony Computer Entertainment
The Last of Us Original release date(s): June 14, 2013	Release years by system: 2013 – PlayStation 3
The Last of Us Original release date(s): June 14, 2013	Notes: First game in The Last of Us series.; Action-adventure survival horror game published by Sony Computer Entertainment
The Last of Us: Left Behind Original release date(s): February 14, 2014	Release years by system: 2014 – PlayStation 3, PlayStation 4
The Last of Us: Left Behind Original release date(s): February 14, 2014	Notes: Action-adventure survival horror game published by Sony Computer Entertainment; Downloadable expansion pack to The Last of Us; Released as a standalone expansion pack for PlayStation 3 and PlayStation 4
The Last of Us Remastered Original release dates: NA: July 29, 2014; AU: July 30, 2014; EU: July 30, 2014; UK: August 1, 2014	Release years by system: 2014 – PlayStation 4
The Last of Us Remastered Original release dates: NA: July 29, 2014; AU: July 30, 2014; EU: July 30, 2014; UK: August 1, 2014	Notes: Enhanced port of The Last of Us and The Last of Us: Left Behind; Published by Sony Computer Entertainment
Uncharted 4: A Thief's End Original release date: May 10, 2016	Release years by system: 2016 – PlayStation 4
Uncharted 4: A Thief's End Original release date: May 10, 2016	Notes: Action-adventure shooter platform game published by Sony Computer Entertainment
Uncharted: The Lost Legacy Original release date(s): NA: August 22, 2017; EU: August 23, 2017	Release years by system: 2017 – PlayStation 4
Uncharted: The Lost Legacy Original release date(s): NA: August 22, 2017; EU: August 23, 2017	Notes: Action-adventure game published by Sony Interactive Entertainment; Standalone expansion in the Uncharted series
The Last of Us Part II Original release date(s): June 19, 2020	Release years by system: 2020 – PlayStation 4
The Last of Us Part II Original release date(s): June 19, 2020	Notes: Action-adventure survival horror game published by Sony Interactive Entertainment
Uncharted: Legacy of Thieves Collection Original release date(s): January 28, 2022	Release years by system: 2022 – PlayStation 5, Windows
Uncharted: Legacy of Thieves Collection Original release date(s): January 28, 2022	Notes: Remastered versions of Uncharted 4: A Thief's End and Uncharted: The Lost Legacy
The Last of Us Part I Original release date(s): September 2, 2022	Release years by system: 2022 – PlayStation 5; 2023 – Windows
The Last of Us Part I Original release date(s): September 2, 2022	Notes: Remake of The Last of Us and The Last of Us: Left Behind
The Last of Us Part II Remastered Original release date(s): January 19, 2024	Release years by system: 2024 – PlayStation 5; 2025 – Windows
The Last of Us Part II Remastered Original release date(s): January 19, 2024	Notes: Enhanced port of The Last of Us Part II; Published by Sony Interactive Entertainment
Intergalactic: The Heretic Prophet Original release date(s): TBA	Release years by system: TBA – PlayStation 5
Intergalactic: The Heretic Prophet Original release date(s): TBA	Notes: Science-fiction game
