= Flektor =

Web application

Flektor, Inc.
- Company type: Corporation
- Website type: video mash-up
- Available in: English
- Founded: Culver City, California
- Headquarters: Culver City, California
- Key people: Jason Rubin, Co-founder, CEO; Andy Gavin, Co-founder, CTO; Jason Kay, COO; Scott Shumaker, VP of Technology; Ryan Evans, VP of Product; Daniel Pickford, VP Engineering;
- Services: web applications
- Website: www.flektor.com
- Current status: inactive

Flektor was a web application that allowed users the ability to create and "mashup" their own content (photos, videos, music, etc.) and share it via email, on social networking websites MySpace, Facebook, Blogger, Digg, eBay or on personal blogs. The company's website (Flektor.com) launched on April 2, 2007, and over 40,000 people began utilizing its features just one month later. Flektor closed down in January 2009.

Flektor offered tools and widgets that included audio, video, photos, text, and approximately 100 effects, transitions and filters to be used with media. Users could create personalized slideshows, polls, postcards, and streaming video projects which the website calls "fleks". Flektor also offered Chat (used as a MySpace addon) and Movie Editor, which provided the ability to edit content and assets together. Users of Flektor could import media from websites like Photobucket and Google's YouTube, and then edit their content with the site's editing tools.

Flektor's erstwhile competitors include Slide.com (founded by PayPal co-founder Max Levchin), RockYou!, Yahoo's JumpCut and Brightcove.

== History ==
Flektor was created by Jason Rubin, Andy Gavin and former HBO executive Jason R. Kay. Both Rubin and Gavin spent most of their careers in the video game industry developing games for publishers like Electronic Arts, Universal Interactive Studios and Sony Computer Entertainment America. They founded a successful game development studio called Naughty Dog and were responsible for games such as Crash Bandicoot and Jak and Daxter. After selling Naughty Dog to Sony, Rubin focused on a comic book series called Iron and the Maiden before teaming up again with Gavin to venture into the web industry with Flektor. Jason Kay spent four years at Home Box Office, working as a consultant to the EVP of Business Development. They recruited former employee and then Naughty Dog Lead Programmer Scott Shumaker to lead the technology team along with Gavin. Ryan Evans joined shortly thereafter, spearheading product development. Flektor is based in Culver City, California.

In May 2007, the company was sold to Fox Interactive Media, which is a division of News Corp., for more than $20 million. The deal coincided with Fox's acquisition of Photobucket, an image-hosting and sharing website. Fox Interactive Media already holds possession of MySpace, IGN Entertainment, FOXSports.com, AmericanIdol.com and Rotten Tomatoes. After the acquisition, Rubin, Gavin and Kay departed, leaving the studio in the hands of Shumaker and Evans.

In the fall of 2007, Flektor partnered with its sister company, MySpace, and MTV to provide instant audience feedback via polls for the interactive MySpace/ MTV Presidential Dialogues series with presidential candidates Senator Barack Obama, Senator John McCain and John Edwards. Use of Flektor's polling system, enabled hosts John McLaughlin and Geoffrey Garin to cater their questions towards subjects of voter-interest.

In the fall of 2008, Flektor built the official site for the 2008 Presidential debates, hosted at MyDebates.

In January 2009, due to a company directive to focus on the core MySpace property, Fox Interactive announced that Flektor would be shut down, with some of its technology being incorporated into MySpace.
