= Corrinne Yu =

American game programmer

- Yu in 2009
- Born: Hong Kong
- Occupation: Game programmer
- Employer: General Motors
- Title: Graphics Programmer
- Spouse: Kenneth Scott

Corrinne Yu is an American game programmer. She has worked on games including Halo 4. Her engine work included Unreal Engine 3, Microsoft's Direct3D Advisory Board, and CUDA and GPU simulation at Nvidia. She has also designed accelerator experiments for nuclear physics research. In 2023 on World Intellectual Property (IP) Day, she was formally recognized as one of the top pioneers in gaming development under that year's theme: Women and IP: Accelerating Innovation and Creativity.

== Biography ==
She programmed for QuickDraw 3D, an early rasterisation API. She worked on the game Zombie, and created the video game engine used in Spec Ops: Rangers Lead The Way. In November 1997, she was employed by video game developer Ion Storm. She worked on the 2001 video game Anachronox and served as Director of Technology at the studio. While at Ion she was responsible for the Quake 2 code base used in their games and any games based on that engine. In November 1998, she left Ion Storm and later became the Lead Technology Programmer at 3D Realms. Yu worked as an engine programmer at Gearbox Software, creator of Brothers in Arms and Borderlands. Yu worked to heavily modify the Epic Unreal Engine 3 with an emphasis on lighting, shadows and physics. Yu was a founding member of Microsoft's Direct 3D Advisory Board. She participated in CUDA and GPU simulation at NVidia.

In 2008, Microsoft Studios hired Yu as the Principal Engine Architect for an internal studio, 343 Industries. 343 Industries was established in 2007 to oversee the Halo franchise following Bungie's separation from Microsoft. Yu programmed lighting, facial animation, and developed new technology for the 2012 video game Halo 4. While coding on Halo team, Yu researched new lighting techniques, and invented new dynamic radiosity algorithms. Microsoft applied a software patent for Yu's Halo lighting work.

In November 2013, Yu joined video game developer Naughty Dog, a subsidiary of Sony Computer Entertainment, to work as a graphic programmer on PlayStation 4 projects, like Uncharted.In November 2014, she left Naughty Dog and joined Amazon.com to work on their Amazon Prime Air program. In March 2018, she left Amazon and joined General Motors as a VP of Engineering.

=== Other works and awards ===
In 2009, Corrinne Yu won Best in Engineering internationally at GDC (Game Developers Conference) WiG nominated and judged by a panel of her industry peers for the last 2 years in a row, for her work in programming. In 2010, Yu was identified by Kotaku as one of the 10 most influential women in games in the last decade. She is the only director of technology, and the only engine programmer, on this list.

== Development style and influences ==
Yu is driven by her interest in how complex pieces can be made to fit together, and compared every day to playing a game of Minecraft, only more flexible and with greater real world applicability.

== Work ==
- Last of Us (2013) Graphics Engineering
- Halo 4 (2012) Graphics Engineering
- Brothers in Arms: Hell's Highway (2008) Programming
- Anachronox (2001) Programming
- Spec Ops: Rangers Lead the Way (1998) Programming
