= Jeremy England =

American physicist

- Born: 1982 (age 43–44); Boston, Massachusetts
- Education: Harvard University; University of Oxford; Stanford University
- Known for: Dissipation-driven adaptation hypothesis of abiogenesis
- Scientific career
- Fields: Biophysics
- Workplaces: Massachusetts Institute of Technology; Georgia Institute of Technology; GlaxoSmithKline; Bar-Ilan University
- Thesis: Theory and Simulation of Explicit Solvent Effects on Protein Folding in Vitro and in Vivo (2009)
- Doctoral advisor: Vijay S. Pande
- Website: www.englandlab.com

Jeremy England is an American physicist and Orthodox rabbi. He is noted for his argument that the spontaneous emergence of life may be explained by the better heat dissipation of more organized arrangement of molecules compared to that of groups of less organized molecules. England terms his interpretation "dissipation-driven adaptation".

== Early life and conversion to Orthodox Judaism ==
England was born in Boston, Massachusetts and raised in a college town in New Hampshire. His mother was the daughter of Polish Jewish Holocaust survivors, while his father was a non-observant Lutheran. He was raised Jewish but did not seriously study Judaism and the Torah until he attended graduate school at Oxford University. He now considers himself an Orthodox Jew who has been inspired by Zionism.

England attended the Research Science Institute at MIT in the summer of 1998. He earned a bachelor's degree in biochemistry from Harvard in 2003. After being awarded a Rhodes Scholarship, England studied at St. John's College, Oxford, from 2003 until 2005. He earned his Ph.D. in physics at Stanford in 2009 under Vijay S. Pande, where he was supported by a Hertz Fellowship. In 2011, he joined MIT as an assistant professor of physics; subsequently, he was associate professor of physics from 2017 until 2019. In 2019, he left MIT to join GlaxoSmithKline as a senior director in artificial intelligence and machine learning; he was promoted to vice president in 2023. He was a principal research scientist at Georgia Tech from 2020 until 2023, when he joined Bar-Ilan University as a visiting professor of physics. In February 2025, he left GSK to found Conquest Labs.

== Views on Palestinians ==
In 2008 England wrote an article for The Stanford Review that contested Palestinians' right to the land occupied by Israel since 1948. He expressed a desire to see Palestinians removed from this occupied territory, wishing the refugees of the Nakba "well in finding homes outside the Land of Israel". In 2024 England wrote an article for Tablet Magazine in which he advocated for the conquest, annexation, and settling of the Gaza Strip by Jews and Zionist-sympathizing gentiles, stating that Jews may kill those who are innocent with the rabbinic justification that "it is correct to kill even the righteous among your enemy."

== Theoretical work ==
England has developed a hypothesis of the physics of the origins of life, based on a mechanism which he calls dissipation-driven adaptation. The hypothesis holds that random groups of molecules can self-organize to more reliably absorb and dissipate heat from the environment, and that such self-organizing systems are an inherent part of the physical world. In 2020 Jeremy England exposed his ideas in a popular book, Every Life is on Fire.

== In popular culture ==
A fictionalized version of England and his theory are featured in the novel Origin by Dan Brown. England, who is an Orthodox Jew and ordained rabbi, has written that he strongly rejects Brown's depiction of him as being a scientist who is unconcerned with spiritual matters.

== Awards ==
England was selected as a Rhodes Scholar and Hertz fellow in 2003. In 2012, he was featured in Forbes 30 Under 30 for his scientific achievements. In 2021, he received the Irwin Oppenheim Award from the American Physical Society alongside Sumantra Sarkar.

== See also ==
- Energy rate density
- Howard T. Odum
- Maximum power principle
