= Way of the Warrior =

1994 video game

- Developer: Naughty Dog
- Publisher: Universal Interactive Studios
- Director: Jason Rubin
- Producers: Jason Rubin; Andy Gavin
- Designers: Jason Rubin; Andy Gavin
- Programmer: Andy Gavin
- Artist: Jason Rubin
- Platform: 3DO
- Release: NA: August 1994
- Genre: Fighting
- Modes: Single-player, multiplayer

Way of the Warrior is a 1994 fighting game developed by Naughty Dog and published by Universal Interactive Studios for the 3DO. The game, which emulates Mortal Kombat, features nine playable characters, who compete in a tournament to earn their place in the "Book of Warriors". Like its inspiration, the game features characters digitized from live actors as well as round-ending fatality moves.

Naughty Dog co-founders Jason Rubin and Andy Gavin, discouraged by their prior experiences with Electronic Arts, took a hiatus from the video game industry until they were approached by The 3DO Company founder Trip Hawkins, who encouraged them to develop a game for the 3DO console. Inspired by the popularity of fighting games, Naughty Dog self-funded and developed Way of the Warrior in a Boston apartment with a cast of friends and family members, using a cream-colored sheet as a backdrop and improvised costumes. Following a financially straining development, Naughty Dog showcased the game at the Consumer Electronics Show, securing a publishing deal with Universal after a bidding war. The game and Universal's publishing deal marked Naughty Dog's shift to professional development, paving the way for future successes like Crash Bandicoot.

Way of the Warrior received mixed reviews upon release. Critics praised its graphics and soundtrack, but criticized its controls, gameplay, and lack of depth in the movesets. Sales of the game were satisfactory by 3DO standards, but modest relative to the larger industry due to the console's small market presence.

== Gameplay and premise ==
Way of the Warrior's characters were digitized from live actors, who were friends and family members of Naughty Dog's developers.

Way of the Warrior is a one-on-one fighting game in which players select from nine characters to battle in one of two modes. Versus is a two-player duel, while Tournament is a single-player campaign in which the player character must defeat a series of opponents, culminating in two boss fights. A third mode, Demo, is a computer-controlled battle between two randomly selected opponents within an arena of the player's choice. The game's narrative focuses on a once-in-a-century tournament held at a Himalayan citadel, where combatants vie for a place in the final page of the "Book of Warriors". Using the d-pad and buttons, the player can move, jump, block, and attack with a basic series of kicks and punches. Special moves can be performed with combinations of inputs. Performing moves earns the player "skull points" depending on the move's difficulty and strength. Skull points can be used to cast magic spells that increase the player's health or weaken the opponent. When the opponent's health has decreased to a certain level, their health bar will begin to flash. The player can perform a fatality at this time, which wins the player the round and rewards skull points. Certain arenas contain hazards (such as lava pits) that may also create fatalities. Handicaps can be set in the main menu, balancing matches between skill levels.

== Development ==
Naughty Dog founders Andy Gavin and Jason Rubin, while satisfied with their work on Keef the Thief (1989) and Rings of Power (1992) for Electronic Arts (EA), were discouraged by their loss of creative control and support from EA's marketing division, and decided to take a hiatus from the video game industry. Gavin pursued a PhD at the Massachusetts Institute of Technology (MIT), while Rubin moved to California intending to take up surfing. Rubin instead established a special effects company, initiating his involvement in 3D computer graphics. Rubin's company soon accepted a contract from Columbia Pictures to create a shot for the film Wolf (1994). Eight months after the start of their hiatus and before Rubin would begin work on Wolf, Gavin and Rubin received a call from EA founder Trip Hawkins, who disclosed his plan for a new disc-based console named the 3DO and offered the pair free development kits. Gavin and Rubin were quickly persuaded by the prospect of games made for a large and readily produceable format, thus bypassing the cartridge-printing decisions encountered with Rings of Power, and accepted Hawkins's proposal. After agreeing to create a game for the 3DO, Gavin and Rubin began development in 1993 without an attached publisher, and self-funded production with the money made from Rings of Power, amounting to $80,000. According to Rubin, Way of the Warrior marked Naughty Dog's transition from hobbyist game development to a professional endeavor. While they still lacked a business plan, Rubin insisted that designing instinctively was the "appropriate way to make games", while Gavin added that self-funding without the oversight of publishers pushed them to devote their time and resources more wisely.

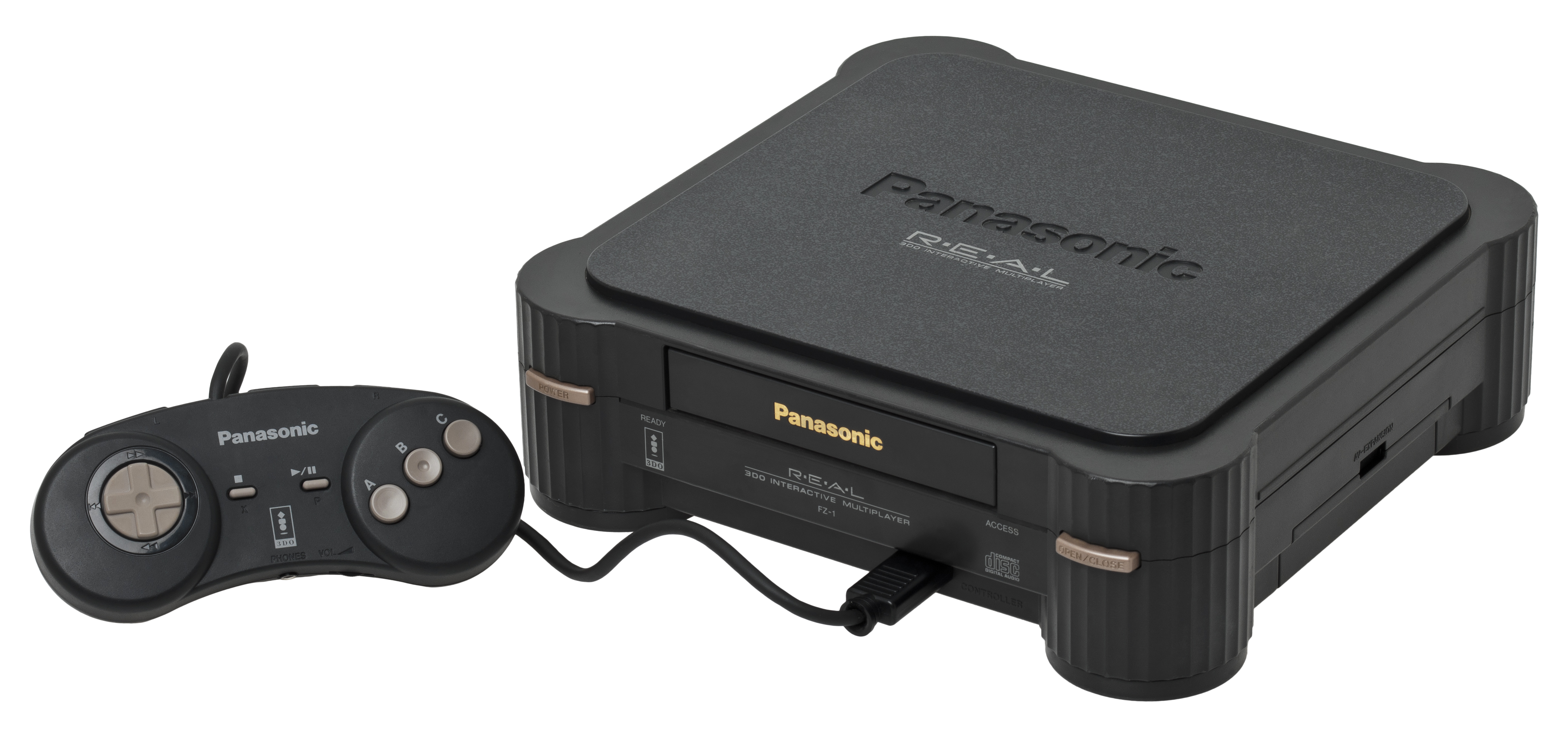
Development on Way of the Warrior began after Naughty Dog was encouraged by Trip Hawkins to create a game for the 3DO console.

Way of the Warrior was inspired by the popularity of fighting games such as Mortal Kombat, Street Fighter and Samurai Shodown. Rubin observed that the direct nature and smaller size of fighting games in comparison to role-playing games made them easier and quicker to make. Gavin explained that "You make one background and one character, you play against yourself, and you've got a playable game. You could start working out balance issues and play issues and stuff." Gavin and Rubin aimed to create an over-the-top and "slightly more comedic" Mortal Kombat, primarily inspired by a number of Hong Kong kung fu films they had watched together. Knowing that they would have to work in the same location to make the game, Rubin attempted to convince Gavin to move to Newport Beach, California. However, Gavin was still attending the MIT, and so convinced Rubin to come to Boston, acquiring an apartment for them to live and work in.

Gavin and Rubin enlisted friends and family members to portray the game's characters; Crimson "Glory" Smith was played by Rubin's ex-girlfriend Carole May, while Gavin's younger brother Mitch played "Shaky" Jake Querious. Rubin also participated by portraying Jeremy "Konotori" Cash. Chin "The Dragon" Liu was portrayed by Tae Min Kim, who was a black belt in aikido. A year after the game's release, Kim was killed in a cycling accident, and received a dedication in Naughty Dog's subsequent game Crash Bandicoot. Most of the cast worked for free, as Gavin and Rubin were unable to pay them. The game's costumes were thrown together and purchased from a single store in Boston's Chinatown, with Gavin and Rubin not knowing what a given character would look like until the uniform was at the register. Various items in the apartment also figured into the characters' costumes. In particular, the costume of the character Gulab Jamun (portrayed by Vijay S. Pande) consisted of a pillowcase for his loincloth, a sheet for his turban, and a gem from a secondhand Jasmine dress-up kit.

Although Gavin and Rubin intended to replicate Mortal Kombat's visuals with a digitized approach, their restricted budget disallowed a chroma key system or any kind of motion capture backdrop. Thus, they bought a cream-colored screen and nailed it to the living room wall, covering the apartment's only windows as well as the air conditioning vents. The position of the screen, improper lenses for their camera, and small size of the apartment complicated the filming process. To film the moves in the game, Rubin had to open the front door and shoot from the apartment hallway. This confused and disturbed their neighbors, who mistakenly believed that the pair were filming kinky pornographic films. Two 1000-watt lights were used during filming despite the lack of ventilation caused by the screen; the apartment's temperature reached as much as 105 degrees while filming for the character Nikki Chan.

The game's voices were recorded through the Apple Macintosh microphone jack. Gavin and Rubin created much of the kung fu vocalizations themselves, with Gavin spending nights working on audio processing. Rodney Brooks, at the time the head of the MIT's Artificial Intelligence lab, provided the voice of "Shaky" Jake Querious. Chin "The Dragon" Liu's voice was provided by David R. Liu, who was the valedictorian of the Harvard class of 1994 and was known as a prolific professional Street Fighter II player. Liu was also the game's lead tester, and would attempt to plug Way of the Warrior during television interviews about his time in Harvard. Gavin voiced Malcolm Fox and Kull, while Rubin voiced the Book Keeper and the High Abbot. The soundtrack features several tracks from White Zombie's album La Sexorcisto: Devil Music Volume One. Way of the Warrior is the first video game to feature music by Rob Zombie, who would be featured in several subsequent video game soundtracks.

== Marketing and release ==
Development took place over the course of 12 months on a total budget of $100,000. Although Gavin was being paid $14,000 a year to go through the MIT's masters program, his and Rubin's financial and living situation deteriorated during production, and they sold their remaining belongings to get by while finishing the game. With their last $10,000, they rented a 3×3 space within the 3DO booth at the Winter Consumer Electronics Show to search for a publisher. Gavin and Rubin found themselves surrounded by games being marketed by publishers as "multimedia", which Rubin assessed as "lots of badly shot, interactive video, and weird semi-gaming crap"; Rubin then surmised that the publishers realized the failure of their approach and began seeking out "real games", with Way of the Warrior being the only one nearing completion.

As a result, a bidding war broke out between Universal Interactive, The 3DO Company, and Crystal Dynamics. Gavin and Rubin nearly accepted Crystal Dynamics's offer, but discovered an internal divide between those who wanted to publish the game and those who wanted to purchase the game and use its engine to develop Samurai Shodown titles. 3DO's Hawkins, who Gavin described as charismatic and fair, also pushed hard for the rights, but Gavin and Rubin were wary of his persuasive charm despite their previous business experiences with him. Universal Interactive ultimately won the game's publishing rights by offering Naughty Dog a place on their Los Angeles lot and funding for three additional games, over which Naughty Dog would have creative freedom. Rubin reflected that a 3DO exclusivity could have ended Naughty Dog. Way of the Warrior was released in North America in August 1994. An arcade version developed by American Laser Games was showcased by the Amusement and Music Operators Association, but was not released.

== Reception ==
Reception

Review scores
Publication	Score
Consoles +	69%
Electronic Gaming Monthly	5/10, 4/10, 3/10, 3/10 (Note: Each of the four reviewers in Electronic Gaming Monthly scored the game on a ten point scale)
Game Informer	3.5/10
GamesMaster	43%
Génération 4	80%
Next Generation	2/5
Video Games (DE)	64%
VideoGames & Computer Entertainment	7/10
3DO Magazine	3/5

Way of the Warrior received mixed reviews upon release. Ed Semrad of Electronic Gaming Monthly (EGM) recommended renting over buying, while Tim Tucker of GamesMaster and Chris Gore of VideoGames - The Ultimate Gaming Magazine advised avoiding it entirely, suggesting players wait for better 3DO fighting games like Samurai Shodown or Super Street Fighter II Turbo. While Next Generation and Ryan Butt of 3DO Magazine saw potential in its presentation, "Scary Larry" of GamePro said it would appeal mainly to 3DO owners desperate for a fighting game.

The visuals were considered a highlight. Reviewers like Gore, Butt, and Génération 4's Stéphane Belin noted the high-quality digitized characters and detailed backgrounds. Belin praised the zoom system, which adjusts sprite size based on distance, for being practical and visually striking. However, Gore criticized the cheap-looking character costumes, and Tucker and Belin faulted the limited animation frames for reducing fluidity. The diverse character roster was highlighted, with Butt appreciating their unique, humorous designs. However, Scary Larry and Tucker criticized the characters as derivative of Mortal Kombat or Street Fighter (with Scary Larry drawing comparisons to Raiden and Chun-Li), and Gore called them "white trash" non-actors with cheesy costumes. The White Zombie soundtrack was praised by Scary Larry, Next Generation, and Butt for adding atmosphere. However, the sound effects were criticized as weak, and the voice acting was deemed poor or cheesy, with Scary Larry noting Crimson Glory's yelp sounding underwhelming.

Critics widely panned the controls, describing them as slow, unresponsive, and difficult for executing moves or jumps. The controller's handling was a particular issue, with Belin noting the block button complicating gameplay and Gore comparing the experience to playing in "thick jello". The game's fast pace exacerbated these issues, making special moves hard to perform. The special moves and fatalities were said to be limited and lacking in variety. Belin noted only two special moves per character, providing less variety than Street Fighter, and undocumented fatalities. Gore praised the humorous fatalities and the ability to use them in any round, but Scary Larry and EGM's Sushi-X found them unimpressive or hard to execute. Tucker mentioned the lack of combo potential, reducing strategic depth. Scary Larry and Belin noted the AI's "cheap" difficulty, especially at higher levels, requiring significant handicaps to balance. Consoles + described the game as too fast and unforgiving, even for experienced players.

Sales for Way of the Warrior were relatively modest, partly due to the 3DO's limited market penetration. It was the second highest-selling 3DO title at Babbage's in its debut month (behind Road Rash), and would stay within the top ten highest-selling 3DO titles for the next three months. According to Naughty Dog, the game sold well by the console's standards, outdoing the 3DO port of Samurai Shodown.

Game Informer panned the game in a retrospective review, describing it as a poorly executed Mortal Kombat clone. They called the game cheesy and amateurish, likening it to backyard wrestling. While they were initially amused due to the game's ties to the developers, the gameplay was criticized as terrible, with bad animations, absurd jumping mechanics, and poor controls exacerbated by the 3DO controller. The publication portrayed it as a novelty worth playing only to witness its flaws, highlighting Naughty Dog's later success with Crash Bandicoot as a testament to redemption in game development. Street Fighter 6 director Takayuki Nakayama had purchased the game in his youth upon learning of White Zombie's involvement. While he described the control and game balance as unsatisfactory, he found the game endearing for its characters, magic mechanic, and soundtrack.
