= Crash Bandicoot 2: Cortex Strikes Back =

1997 video game

- North American box art
- Developer: Naughty Dog
- Publisher: Sony Computer Entertainment
- Director: Jason Rubin
- Producer: Mark Cerny
- Designer: Mark Cerny
- Programmer: Andy Gavin
- Artists: Charles Zembillas; Erick Pangilinan; Bob Rafei
- Writer: Jason Rubin
- Composer: Josh Mancell
- Series: Crash Bandicoot
- Platform: PlayStation
- Release: NA: November 6, 1997; EU: December 5, 1997
- Genre: Platform
- Mode: Single-player

Crash Bandicoot 2: Cortex Strikes Back is a 1997 platform game developed by Naughty Dog and published by Sony Computer Entertainment for the PlayStation. It is a sequel to Crash Bandicoot (1996), and is part of the Crash Bandicoot series. Taking place on a fictional group of islands near Australia, Crash Bandicoot 2 follows the adventures of the anthropomorphic bandicoot named Crash. Crash is abducted by series villain Doctor Neo Cortex, who tricks him into thinking he wants to save the world. Crash is thrust into several parts of N. Sanity Island in order to gather crystals that will allow Cortex to contain the power of an upcoming planetary alignment and keep the planet from being destroyed. Crash's sister Coco and Cortex's former assistant Doctor Nitrus Brio try to warn him about Cortex, with the latter urging Crash to gather gems instead of crystals.

Cortex Strikes Back received positive reviews from critics and is widely considered to be superior to its predecessor. Much of the praise went to the game's graphics, controls and music, while criticisms focused on the trial-and-error gameplay, lack of level variety, easy boss levels and lack of innovation as a platform game. The game went on to become one of the best-selling PlayStation video games of all time and replaced its predecessor as the highest-selling Western title in Japan at the time, selling more than 800,000 copies in the country by April 1998. A remastered version was released as a part of the Crash Bandicoot N. Sane Trilogy in 2017.

== Gameplay ==
In Cortex Strikes Back, a mask named Aku Aku (pictured) serves to protect Crash from damage at least once and floats in his general vicinity.

Cortex Strikes Back is a platform game in which the player character is the titular Crash Bandicoot. The goal of the game is to gather 25 crystals for Crash's nemesis Doctor Neo Cortex. The crystals are scattered between 25 different levels, accessible via "Warp Rooms", which are hub areas of the game. A level is cleared by collecting its respective crystal and reaching the end of its path, which returns Crash to the Warp Room. Each Warp Room contains five levels. When all five levels are cleared, the player must defeat a boss character before gaining access to the next Warp Room. The player is given a certain amount of lives, which are lost when Crash is attacked by an enemy, or falls into water or a pit. If the player runs out of lives, the game is over. However, it can be continued by selecting "Yes" at the "Continue?" screen.

Crash has the ability to jump into the air and land on an enemy character, spin in a tornado-like fashion to knock enemies off-screen, slide across the ground, and perform a body slam to break certain objects. Crash can jump higher than he normally can if he jumps immediately following a slide. All of these techniques can be used as offensive measures against most enemies, who serve to deter Crash's progress. Enemies with deadly topsides cannot be jumped on, while enemies that attack from the front or have side spikes must be jumped on or undergo a body slam. Enemies with sharp necklines (such as frill-necked lizards or long-legged robots with heated circumferences on their upper) can only be defeated if Crash slides into them.

Boxes play a prominent role in Cortex Strikes Back and can be broken with all of Crash's techniques. Most boxes in the game contain "Wumpa Fruit", which give the player an extra life if 100 of them are collected. Some boxes contain a Witch Doctor's Mask, which shields Crash from one enemy's attack while it is in his possession. If three masks are collected in a row, Crash is given temporary invulnerability from all minor dangers. If jumped upon, boxes with arrows pointing up propel Crash further into the air than he can ordinarily reach, and such boxes can be broken only with Crash's spin attack. Boxes with an exclamation mark (!) on them cause previously intangible objects in the area to solidify. TNT Boxes explode after a three-second fuse when jumped on, while Nitro Boxes explode upon any physical contact. All of the Nitro Boxes in a level can be detonated at once if a green-colored box with an exclamation mark (!) on it is touched. Checkpoint boxes allow Crash to return to the point where the first checkpoint box has been opened upon losing a life. If more than one checkpoint box has been opened in a stage, Crash returns to the last checkpoint box that has been opened. The player will earn a gem if they manage to destroy all the boxes, including Nitro Boxes and boxes on alternate routes, in a level. Certain gems can be acquired by other means, like reaching the end of a level within a certain time parameter, or completing a level without breaking any boxes.

"Bonus Paths", signified by platforms with a question mark on them, lead Crash to a secret region of the level. In these areas, numerous Wumpa Fruit and extra lives can be collected if the player successfully navigates to the end of the path. If Crash falls off-screen or is otherwise killed off, the player loses whatever was collected in the Bonus Path and is returned to the level from which the Bonus Path was accessed, keeping all lives the player had previously collected.

== Plot ==
After being defeated by Crash Bandicoot aboard his airship, (Note: As depicted in Crash Bandicoot (1996)) Dr. Neo Cortex falls into a cavern full of powerful crystals. One year later, Cortex and his new assistant Dr. N. Gin build an upgraded, crystal-powered Cortex Vortex in outer space. Requiring 25 more crystals to reach the Vortex's maximum capacity but lacking any operatives on Earth, Cortex devises a plot to manipulate Crash into retrieving the crystals for him.

Meanwhile, Crash's younger sister, Coco, has him retrieve a new battery for her laptop, but Crash is teleported by Cortex to an ancient Warp Room within N. Sanity Island. Communicating with Crash via holographic projection, Cortex claims that an upcoming alignment of the planets will unleash energy capable of destroying the Earth and urges Crash to use the Warp Room to retrieve crystals that can contain this energy. Unbeknownst to Cortex, his former assistant Doctor Nitrus Brio also contacts Crash and instructs him to gather gems instead, with which he can destroy Cortex's space station. However, Brio warns Crash that he will use his forces to prevent Crash from collecting more crystals. During his search, Crash battles these forces: the demented Ripper Roo, the scimitar-wielding Komodo Brothers and the ravenous Tiny Tiger.

Coco hacks into Cortex's holographic projector and warns Crash not to trust Cortex. Cortex eventually tells Crash to bring the crystals he collected to N. Gin, but Crash defeats him instead. After Crash gathers all 25 crystals, Coco reveals Cortex's ultimate plan: with the energy harnessed from the planetary alignment, Cortex will power the gigantic Cortex Vortex built onto his space station and brainwash everyone on Earth into serving him. Crash reaches Cortex in outer space and defeats him once again before the crystals can be used, but leaves the Cortex Vortex intact. After collecting all 42 gems, Crash and N. Brio use them to harness the planetary energy into a laser beam that destroys the Cortex Vortex.

== Development and release ==
Production of Cortex Strikes Back began in October 1996. Development took place over the course of 13 months on a budget of $2,000,000. The concept art for the game's environments was mainly created by Naughty Dog employees Bob Rafei, Eric Iwasaki, Erick Pangilinan, Charlotte Francis and Jason Rubin, with Rafei leading concept development, art direction, level assembly and vertex lighting. The jungle levels were originally to have featured ground fog, but this was abandoned when magazines and the public began to criticize other developers for using fog to hide polygon count. Sunlight and depth accentuation was experimented with for these levels. Naughty Dog created the sewer levels as a way to work some "dirty" locations in the game. Color contrast was added to the levels to show depth and break up the monotony of sewer pipes. The character of Coco Bandicoot was created by Naughty Dog as a counterbalance to Tawna (Crash's girlfriend in the first game) that would appease Sony Computer Entertainment Japan, who were uncomfortable with a "super sexy" character being alongside Crash. Character designer Charles Zembillas drew the first sketches of Coco on March 18, 1997.

For the game, Crash Bandicoot co-creator Andy Gavin programmed a new engine named "Game-Oriented Object LISP 2" (GOOL 2); being three times faster than the previous game's engine, it could handle ten times the animation frames and twice the polygon count. A flat plane z-buffer was created for the game; because the water surfaces and mud in the jungle had to be a flat plane and be exactly flat on the Y-axis, there could be no waves and the subdividing plane could not be at an odd angle. The effect only worked on objects in the foreground and was only used on Crash, some enemies and a few boxes at the same time.

Producer Mark Cerny wanted to be more involved with the game design process and set himself a target to design a third of the game's levels. Cerny would end up designing 90% of the game's levels, with Rubin designing the remaining two.

The soundtrack of Cortex Strikes Back was written by Josh Mancell from Mutato Muzika, while the sound effects were created by Universal Sound Studios (consisting of Mike Gollom, Ron Horwitz and Kevin Spears). The characters were designed by Charles Zembillas of American Exitus, Incorporated. Clancy Brown provided the voice of Doctor Neo Cortex, Vicki Winters voiced Coco Bandicoot, and Brendan O'Brien voiced Crash Bandicoot, Doctor N. Gin, and Doctor Nitrus Brio. The game was unveiled at the Electronic Entertainment Expo in Atlanta, Georgia in June 1997 to a positive response from the game industry.

The game went into the alpha stage in August 1997. Around that time, Dan Arey, the lead designer of Gex: Enter the Gecko, joined Naughty Dog and streamlined the level design. A "Dynamic Difficulty Adjustment" system was added, which would adjust elements of the game in response to player activity to balance difficulty. IGDA considers the testing process for Crash Bandicoot 2 the moment where the field of Games User Research "came of age". The game was released in North America on November 6, 1997, and in Europe on December 5.

A death animation in which Crash is squashed into a stunned head and feet was altered for the Japanese version of the game due to its resemblance to the severed head and shoes left by a serial killer loose in Japan at the time.

On July 26, 2007, Cortex Strikes Back was released on the European PlayStation Network, but was withdrawn on August 7, 2007, along with Spyro 2: Gateway to Glimmer and MediEvil, as a precautionary measure when the latter two games experienced technical problems. The game was released on the North American PlayStation Network on January 10, 2008, and re-released on the European PlayStation Network on February 2, 2011.

== Reception ==
Reception

Aggregate score
Aggregator	Score
GameRankings	89%

Review scores
Publication	Score
Consoles +	94%
Computer and Video Games	3/5
Electronic Gaming Monthly	9.5/10, 8/10, 8/10, 8.5/10
Game Informer	9/10
Game Players	9.1/10
GameRevolution	B
GameSpot	8.6/10
Hyper	88%
IGN	8.5/10
Joystick	90%
Next Generation	4/5
Official U.S. PlayStation Magazine	4/5
PlayStation: The Official Magazine	5/5

Crash Bandicoot 2: Cortex Strikes Back was released to favorable reviews, receiving an aggregate score of 89% on GameRankings. The game was often praised as a superior sequel, with Paul Anderson and Andy McNamara of Game Informer and "Major Mike" of GamePro considering it one of the best platformers on the PlayStation, and PlayStation Magazine positioning it as a strong contender against competing franchises like Super Mario and Sonic the Hedgehog.

Reviewers highlighted substantial advancements in gameplay over the original game, with the addition of new abilities, structural changes, and added variety enhancing the experience. Major Mike noted how new moves like sliding and climbing allow for creative enemy defeats and box-breaking. Game Informer emphasized that the jetpack and rocket surfboard levels introduce unpredictable challenges, elevating the gameplay beyond the original's simpler mechanics. Consoles+ and Francesca Reyes of Ultra Game Players remarked that the new moves disrupt old reflexes, adding fresh challenges to the platforming formula. The introduction of Warp Rooms, allowing players to choose from multiple levels in any order, was considered a major improvement over the linear progression of the first game, receiving praise for reducing monotony and frustration. John Broady of GameSpot called the Warp Room system a "great innovation" for its flexibility, appreciating how it allows players to tackle levels at their own pace and revisit earlier ones without penalty. Joe Rybicki of Official U.S. PlayStation Magazine noted that this structure helps players take breaks from difficult levels while still progressing. Consoles+ and Game Informer appreciated the improved difficulty balance, pointing out the shorter levels and adaptive aids like extra checkpoints or masks for repeated failures.

While the controls were generally considered precise, some reviewers found issues with the analog controller and occasional imprecision; they noted that the analog pad makes jumps harder in some cases, with the D-pad often preferred. The ability to save at any time in Warp Rooms was regarded as a significant and player-friendly upgrade from the original's restrictive save system, which Broady called "horrific". IGN described the bonus stages as supporting a gentle learning curve, as they allow players to practice new moves without the penalty of losing a life.

The game's visuals were deemed a standout for their vibrant, cartoon-quality graphics, detailed animations, and environmental effects, and were often described as among the best on the PlayStation. Major Mike called the graphics a "quantum leap" over the original, with enhanced animations like Crash's expressive reactions. The reviewers of Electronic Gaming Monthly (EGM) and Next Generation lauded the seamless, high-resolution polygons and character animations, with the latter noting Naughty Dog's mastery of the PlayStation's graphics engine. Mark Cooke of GameRevolution described the visuals as "cartoon quality", setting a new standard for PlayStation games. The audio was well-received for enhancing the game's cartoon-like atmosphere; Major Mike likened the music to a blend of the Pulp Fiction soundtrack and the B-52s, calling it perfect for the stages, while Shawn Smith of EGM cited Clancy Brown's "booming" voice as a highlight. The cutscenes were praised, with Smith calling them "some of the best in-game cutscenes [he has] seen", though Andrew Reiner of Game Informer was disappointed by the endings' brevity.

Minor criticisms varied amongst critics. Broady noted that the semi-3D setup is "sometimes hard to navigate" and elaborated that "you'll find yourself missing jumps because you're unable to judge distances properly." Additionally, he criticized the trial-and-error aspect of the gameplay as "just plain cheap" and stated that "in some areas you must sacrifice many lives until you memorize a level's layout." The IGN staff said that the level design "isn't as varied as it could be" and added that the "jungle, snow and water" environments are recycled from the previous game and reused multiple times in Cortex Strikes Back. They also described the boss levels as "insultingly easy". Major Mike similarly commented "Although [the bosses] look awesome, they have easy-to-recognize patterns and present no challenge." Cooke observed that, like its predecessor, the game did not add anything to the genre and summarized that "the first Crash was dauntingly similar to the 16-bit platform games of yester-yore, only with better graphics, and Crash 2 doesn't deviate much from this formula".

=== Sales and awards ===
In its first month of release, Crash Bandicoot 2 was the seventh best-selling home console game in the United States, and peaked as the fourth best-selling game the following two months. By late February 1998, its sales has reached 1 million units in the United States, 800,000 units in Japan, and 340,000 units in Europe. It reappeared in the top 20 best-selling chart in September 1998 and the remainder of the year. According to the NPD Group, it was the ninth best-selling video game of 1998 by unit sales. By February 1999, 4.08 million copies of Crash Bandicoot 2 had been shipped to retailers worldwide; the NPD Group reported sell-through of 1.49 million copies in North America alone. It stayed within the best-seller chart for the first four months of 1999. By December 2007, Cortex Strikes Back had sold 3.78 million units in the United States and 1.3 million in Japan. This makes it one of the best-selling PlayStation video games of all time. The game's success resulted in its re-release for the Sony Greatest Hits lineup on August 30, 1998, and for the Platinum Range in 1999. The game replaced Crash Bandicoot as the highest-selling non-Japanese title in Japan, selling over 800,000 copies by April 1998.

Crash Bandicoot 2 was nominated for "Console Game of the Year" and "Console Action Game of the Year" at the inaugural Interactive Achievement Awards.
