= Rings of Power (video game) =

1992 video game

- Developer: Naughty Dog
- Publisher: Electronic Arts
- Producer: Christopher Erhardt
- Designers: Andy Gavin; Jason Rubin; Vijay S. Pande
- Programmers: Andy Gavin; Vijay S. Pande
- Artist: Jason Rubin
- Writer: Andy Gavin
- Composer: Alexander Hinds
- Platform: Genesis
- Release: NA: January 1992; EU: February 1992
- Genre: Role-playing
- Mode: Single-player

Rings of Power is a 1992 role-playing video game developed by Naughty Dog and published by Electronic Arts (EA) for the Sega Genesis. The player takes on the role of an apprentice sorcerer named Buc, whose quest is to assemble a team of adventurers and collect eleven rings to defeat the evil god Void.

The game was pitched under the working title Buccaneer by Naughty Dog founders Andy Gavin and Jason Rubin following the release of their previous title Keef the Thief, and was developed while the pair attended college in separate states. It was originally intended for an MS-DOS and Amiga release until Gavin and Rubin happened upon – and decided to invest in – EA's secret operation of using makeshift development kits to create Genesis games without Sega's permission; as a result, Rings of Power became Naughty Dog's first console video game.

The game received mixed reviews upon release, with critics praising its presentation and scope but criticizing its controls, scrolling, and gameplay. Although Rings of Power was a moderate commercial success, EA declined to reprint the game for technical and financial reasons. This experience discouraged Gavin and Rubin and convinced them to take a hiatus from the video game industry.

== Gameplay ==
An example of combat in Rings of Power. The enchanter Obliky has used a spell to transform himself into a dragon for an attack.

Rings of Power is a role-playing video game in which the player controls an apprentice sorcerer named Buc, who is tasked with exploring the land of Ushka Bau and gathering a team of five other adventurers, with whom he must collect the eleven titular Rings of Power in order to confront and defeat the evil god Void. The game is played from an isometric perspective and with a diagonal control scheme; the camera zooms closer to Buc whenever he enters a building. The game's setting can be traversed on foot or with an assortment of vehicles, including dinosaurs, boats, ships, and dragons. Magical gateways marked by a ring of statues are scattered across the setting and can transport Buc and his party to other locations in the world. The game features a day–night cycle, and many tasks and quests can only be accomplished during the day or the night. Various characters can be conversed with to obtain information concerning the Rings or other quests at hand. Characters can also be bribed with currency, which can be used to gain information or unlock doors.

Combat can either be initiated with a command while talking to a pedestrian or may occur randomly while traveling. During combat, Buc and his party are located on the left side of the screen and have blue shadows, while their opponents are located on the right side and have orange shadows. Each party member is equipped with a strength and magic meter, which are affected by how much damage a character takes or the type of spells the character uses. A party member will die if their strength meter is fully depleted, and a character will only be able to cast weak spells if their magic is depleted. The player can set the party's spells to be selected automatically or manually, and can adjust how aggressively a party member behaves in a fight. Winning a fight grants the party currency and experience points, which can be used to learn stronger spells. Strength and magic can be restored by camping, which also accelerates the passage of time.

== Plot ==
Long ago, the divine being Nexus the Benevolent used the Rod of Creation to turn the desolate planet of Ushka Bau into a paradise. He then granted humanity the gift of the Six Arts: the Art of Separation, practiced by knights; the Art of Summoning, practiced by conjurors; the Art of Force, practiced by archers; the Art of Change, practiced by enchanters; the Art of the Body, practiced by necromancers; and the Art of the Mind, practiced by sorcerers. After a long age of prosperity, Nexus's envious demonic brother Void the Destroyer stole the Rod and created an age of chaos that lasted 66 years. Nexus and Void engaged in a titanic battle that split the Rod in two, and each fled with half. They further divided their halves into eleven Rings of Power and hid them to keep each other from reassembling the Rod and taking power again.

500 years later, the Rings have yet to be recovered and have passed into legend. However, the six Guildmasters discover strong evidence of the Rings' existence as well as clues to their locations. To prevent Void's minions from reassembling the Rod, each of the Guildmasters decide to charge six of their most promising students with forming a team of five other adventurers from each discipline and finding the Rings. As the Guildmaster Thalmus the Wise prepares the top students of the Academy of the Mind for this quest, he is attacked and killed by Darius, a student who has fallen under Void's influence, and the other students are teleported elsewhere by Thalmus's dying word.

Buc, the Academy of the Mind's most promising student, builds a team – consisting of the knight Slash, the necromancer Mortimer, the archer Feather, the conjuror Alexi and the enchanter Obliky – and sets out to gather the eleven Rings. After retrieving them, Buc and his team take the Rings to Nexus's seat at the Fount of Heaven and defeat Darius, who has become Void's physical vessel. Nexus transports Buc and the Rings to his realm and reassembles the Rod of Creation. Nexus leaves the Rod in Buc's care, claiming that keeping it in either his or Void's possession would upset the balance between them. Upon returning to his world, Buc creates a mighty palace in the Fount of Heaven's place from which he rules from that day forward.

== Development and release ==
Following the completion of Keef the Thief in 1989, Naughty Dog founders Andy Gavin and Jason Rubin pitched a more ambitious role-playing game code-named Buccaneer to EA, and requested $90,000 to develop the game; the budget would balloon to $150,000 by the end of the game's production. At the time, Gavin and Rubin were college seniors in different states, with Gavin at Haverford College in Pennsylvania and Rubin at the University of Michigan. The pair spent a year trading information and data using modems ranging from 300 to 2,400 baud. During the summers, they reconvened at Gavin's family home in Virginia to continue work on the game. These circumstances, as well as the size of the game, prolonged development from a projected two years to nearly three.

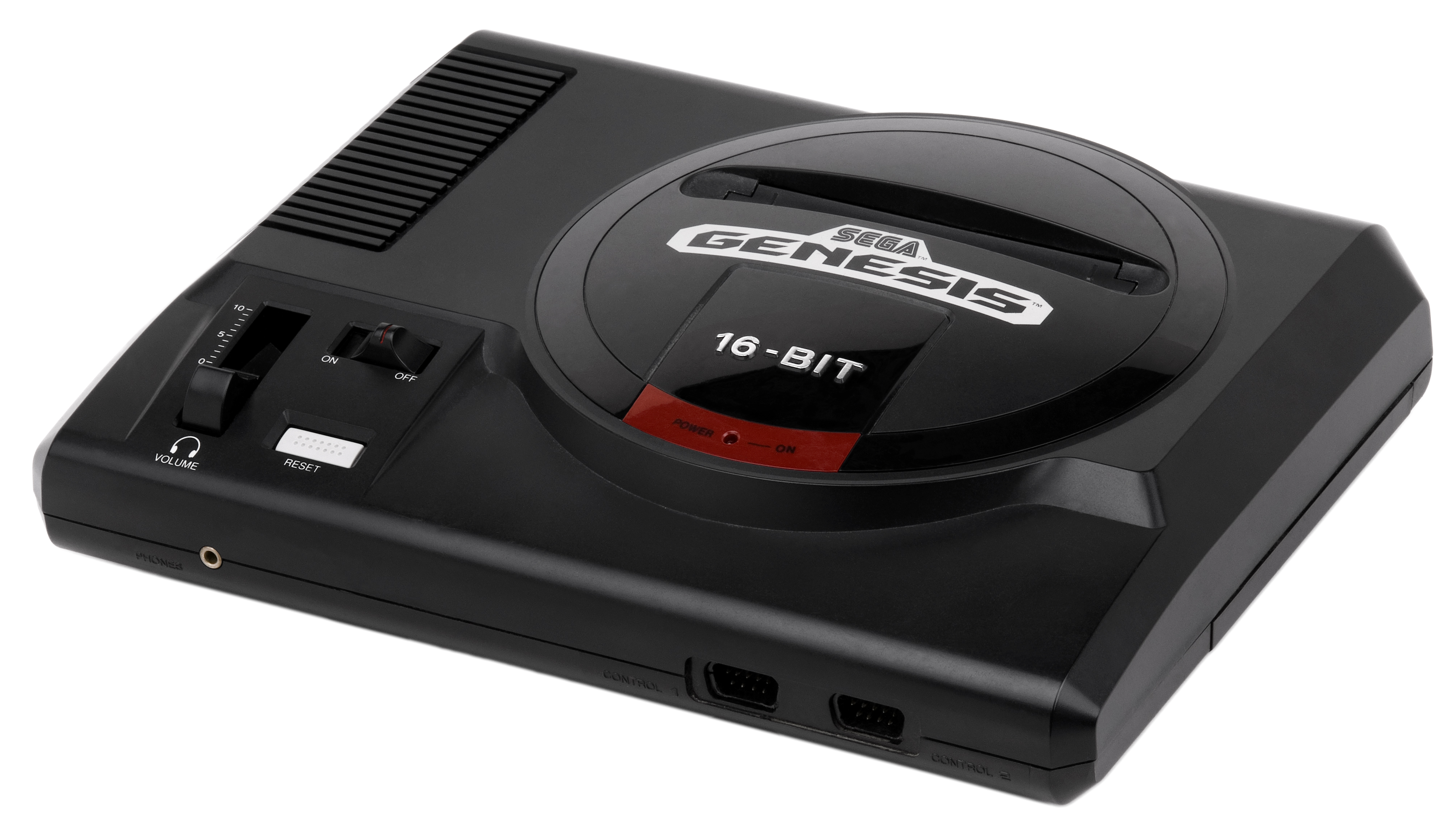
Development for Rings of Power switched from the PC and Amiga to the Sega Genesis (pictured) after Gavin took notice of EA's reverse-engineered development kits.

Buccaneer, eventually titled Rings of Power, was originally developed as a PC and Amiga release, although EA considered them to be weak platforms. During a visit by Gavin and Rubin to EA's offices, Gavin immediately identified a reverse-engineered Sega Genesis development kit – EA was privately using these kits to develop Genesis games without Sega's permission, with plans to use this ability as leverage against Sega to obtain a better licensing agreement from them. After pointing out the development kit, Gavin and Rubin were required by EA founder Trip Hawkins to sign non-disclosure agreements, upon which Gavin suggested that Rings of Power would make a suitable Genesis release. Hawkins agreed, wishing for Gavin and Rubin to invest in the success of EA's secret operation. As a result, Rings of Power became Naughty Dog's first console game, as well as the second EA game to begin development for the Genesis. Rubin later voiced regret for the decision to change platforms, as it affected the game's quality.

The visuals for Rings of Power were created by Rubin from 8×8-pixel 16-color blocks, with as many of these blocks being reused as possible. The game's world map took a total of six months for Rubin to lay out, and he flipped or alternated colors to break up the repetitiveness of the landscape. EA's Genesis development kits altered surrounding electronic signals, which interfered with television reception. Because the white noise pattern would change depending on how busy the development kit's graphics hardware was, Gavin used the television across his dorm room as a debugging aid. The game's dialogue was written by Gavin. The amount of dialogue required Gavin and Rubin to compile and compress each of the script's words into "dictionaries" as a space-saving measure. The titular character of Keef the Thief has a cameo appearance in the game as a non-player character. Vijay S. Pande, then a physics student at Princeton University in New Jersey, was an additional designer and programmer on the game. The music was composed by Alexander Hinds, a first-year student at the Stanford University School of Medicine in California. The Rings of Power cartridge includes an EEPROM for the purpose of storing saved games. However, less than one thousand bits of space are available on the cartridge for a saved game, and the data-packing measures result in a minuscule loss of in-game currency upon loading a saved game.

An easter egg that replaces the Naughty Dog mascot in the opening credits with a topless woman is included within the game that can be activated by entering a cheat code at startup. An issue of Game Players was pulled from distribution at Toys "R" Us for printing an unedited screenshot of the alternate title sequence. Rings of Power was showcased at the 1991 Summer Consumer Electronics Show, and released in January 1992.

== Reception ==
Reception

Review scores
Publication	Score
GamePro	21/25
VideoGames & Computer Entertainment	6/10
Mean Machines	41%
MegaTech	49%

Rings of Power received mixed reviews upon release. Earth Angel of GamePro compared the game's size to The Seven Cities of Gold and felt that its isometric view, battle scenes and "terrific" music made it unique, but mentioned that the scrolling was somewhat choppy and the gameplay had a steep learning curve. Howard H. Wen of VideoGames & Computer Entertainment commended the presentation (describing it as "Ultima with the look of Populous") and was engrossed by the magnitude of the setting. He considered the quests to be interesting and not excessively challenging, but remarked that the more dramatized scenarios were cliched, deeming the backstory to be "from the Tolkien assembly line". His biggest criticism was the difficult diagonal control scheme, suggesting that a point and click system would have been more suitable. He also complained of the uninspired musical direction, and mentioned that the option to toggle music off failed to function when entering a building. MegaTech said that the game was rendered dull and virtually unplayable by poor controls and difficult combat. While Radion Automatic and Julian Rignall of Mean Machines acknowledged the size of the game and its promising concept and design, they considered its potential to have been wasted by slow, unresponsive and frustrating gameplay, "shambolic" scrolling, and poor graphics and sound.

Rings of Power was a moderate commercial success, selling its entire initial allotment of 100,000 copies in three months. However, EA declined to reprint it due to its large and expensive cartridge size compared to John Madden Football, which was selling faster. EA's decision was also influenced by Sega granting only a fixed number of cartridges to reorder, as well as the royalties Naughty Dog would have to be paid as an external developer. The experience of losing EA's support disillusioned Gavin and Rubin, and led them to take a brief hiatus from the video game industry. The game's sales helped fund the development of Naughty Dog's next project, Way of the Warrior.
