= Ski Crazed =

1987 video game

- Developer: JAM Software
- Publisher: Baudville
- Designer: Jason Rubin
- Programmers: Jason Rubin; Andy Gavin
- Artist: Jason Rubin
- Platform: Apple II
- Release: October 1987
- Genre: Sports (alpine skiing)
- Mode: Single-player

Ski Crazed is a 1987 skiing video game developed by JAM Software and published by Baudville for Apple II systems. The game requires the player to master skiing, avoid hazards, and achieve high performance percentages to qualify for a tournament on Mount Kilimanjaro, with the option of creating and skiing custom slopes.

High school friends Andy Gavin and Jason Rubin founded JAM Software in 1984 to develop games for the Apple II. Bureaucratic challenges in distributing an educational game shifted their focus to entertainment. Ski Stud, later renamed Ski Crazed, was coded by Rubin and optimized by Gavin, the pair overcoming technical limitations to create the graphics.

Initially planning a local Washington, D.C. distribution, Gavin and Rubin licensed the game to Baudville, who published it nationally. The game was a modest critical and commercial success, marking Gavin and Rubin's entry into professional game development and allowing them to invest in their following game, Dream Zone.

== Gameplay ==
An example of gameplay from Ski Crazed

Ski Crazed is a skiing video game set on Mount Kilimanjaro, where the player must navigate challenging downhill slopes and slalom courses to compete in the Kilimanjaro Annual International Skiing Tournament. The game features 15 slopes, including moguls, ice hazards, jumps, gates, and flags, with a slope creator for custom designs.

The player can access a tutorial through the "Lessons" option and learn skiing basics from the ski pro "Jammer", following his instructions and practicing with him to master techniques before attempting slopes. In the game proper, the player skis through 15 slopes: 12 downhill, 2 slalom, and the final "Ohh La La" slope. Large and small moguls require precise navigation with the joystick depending on their size to avoid falls. Jumps may lead to ice patches, requiring the player to perform tricks to control their landing position and avoid ice. Signs may warn of upcoming hazards, but become less reliable in harder slopes. Flags appear in the slalom courses and function similarly to moguls, requiring correct joystick input depending on their color. The length of a slope is indicated by a black box on the bottom of the screen, with a white dash representing the player's position. The game does not track a numerical score; performance is instead measured by percentages on the Performance Chart, accessible with the space bar or a button on the joypad. High percentages, signified by a green bar, qualify for the tournament, while low percentages (signified by a red bar) or falling 15 times result in disqualification. The "Practice Slalom" mode allows practice on the Kilimanjaro Slalom and Grand Slalom courses.

The player can design up to 10 custom slopes in the "Make a Slope" mode, placing hazards like jumps, moguls, ice, flags, and signs. Slopes must be between 900 and 2,000 feet and include an end marker. Hazards cannot be placed within 50 feet of large jumps or 20 feet of small jumps, and no three consecutive ice patches can be placed in landing zones after large jumps.

== Development and release ==
In 1984, Andy Gavin and Jason Rubin, 14-year-old high school friends from Washington, D.C., established JAM Software, an acronym for "Jason and Andy's Magic". Operating initially from their homes with financial support from their parents, the duo aimed to develop games for the Apple II, a prominent personal computer at the time. Their first project, Math Jam, was an educational game designed to teach basic arithmetic. It was self-published in 1985 by copying the game onto 5.25-inch floppy disks, including photocopied instructions, and packaging them in Ziploc bags for sale to local schools. However, navigating the bureaucratic requirements of the educational market proved challenging, prompting Rubin and Gavin to shift their focus to entertainment-focused games.

After a number of attempted projects, including a nearly-finished golf game that was accidentally overwritten, Rubin created a skiing game titled Ski Stud, inspired by a recent ski trip. The game, which presented an ethos that Gavin compared to the film Hot Dog...The Movie (1984), was initially coded in the BASIC programming language over a weekend, but its performance was sluggish, slowing down as the player progressed. Gavin optimized the code using assembly language, significantly improving its speed. To create the game's visuals, they innovatively used the Pinball Construction Set's pixel editor, overcoming the limitations of early graphic tools through a painstaking process that involved manipulating the Apple II's framebuffer and performing hardware resets to extract images.

Originally intending to self-publish Ski Stud locally in Ziploc bags, they approached Baudville, a small Michigan-based publisher, for a commercial license to use its sprite-drawing tool. Impressed by the game, Baudville offered to publish it nationally, renaming it Ski Crazed (which Rubin in 2012 attributed to "political correctness") and purchasing the rights for US$250. Baudville announced the game for the Apple II in September 1987 as part of its third-quarter release plans. It was shipped in October 1987, and it became JAM Software's first title.

== Reception and sales ==
Computer Entertainer described Ski Crazed as a lighthearted and fun contrast to the realistic approach of Winter Games (1985) and commended the customization mode for adding variety and enjoyment. The game sold about 1,500 copies. and JAM Software made about US$1,500 from the game. Gavin and Rubin used the money earned from the game's sales to invest in a second disc drive and continued their collaboration with Baudville for their next game, Dream Zone (1988).
