= Dream Zone =

1988 video game

- Developer: JAM Software
- Publisher: Baudville
- Designers: Andy Gavin; Jason Rubin
- Programmer: Andy Gavin
- Artist: Jason Rubin
- Writers: Andy Gavin; Jason Rubin
- Composer: Sarah Sidman
- Platforms: Apple II, Apple IIGS, MS-DOS, Amiga, Atari ST
- Release: Apple II, Apple IIGS; Q2 1988; MS-DOS; November 1988; Amiga, Atari ST; December 1988
- Genre: Graphic adventure
- Mode: Single-player

Dream Zone is a 1988 graphic adventure video game developed by JAM Software and published by Baudville. It was released for the Apple II and Apple IIGS, followed by versions for MS-DOS, the Amiga, and the Atari ST; it was JAM Software's first game released outside the Apple II platform. The story follows a boy who must escape from a surreal dream world by vanquishing a beast causing his recurring nightmares. The game was met with generally positive reviews, with critics commending its atmosphere and presentation while having mixed reactions to its difficulty and humor. The game was JAM Software's last before adopting the Naughty Dog name for their next game, Keef the Thief (1989).

== Gameplay ==
In this example of gameplay from Dream Zone, the player prepares to shoot an uncooperative porcine bureaucratic officer.

Dream Zone is a graphic adventure game in which the player controls a boy who is sent to a surreal dream world by a psychiatrist's potion and must defeat a lurking beast to escape. The game features a screen divided into distinct areas for streamlined interaction: a menu bar at the top for game management, a central picture area displaying the current location with panoramic views and up to twelve objects, a control pad on the right for movement, an icon bar below the picture for action verbs, a command line at the bottom for input execution, and a description window for text responses.

The player issues commands through a hybrid system combining mouse-driven icons and keyboard text entry. Common actions occur via the icon bar, where single-clicking verbs like "drop", "talk", "hit", or "buy" inserts them into the command line, followed by clicking an object or character to complete the phrase, with a final return key activation. Double-clicking verbs toggles alternatives, such as "hit" to "kill" or "buy" to "steal". The control pad provides directional arrows, up and down bars, and a central "enter" button; double-clicking the enter button causes the player to exit the current location. Keyboard equivalents support all commands, including typed directions like "Go north" or full sentences, with function and cursor keys dedicated to frequent actions. Pull-down menus handle saving, loading, editing, options like text colorization, toggling the Visible Objects command, inventory display, music control, and quit functions. The game accommodates up to ten saved games on the disk.

The Visible Objects command renders movable items as icons in the picture area, enabling mouse capture by clicking to name them in the command line to acquire or manipulate. The Special Inventory command shifts icons to the description window for direct use. Inventory appears in the icon bar and can be interacted with from there. Double-clicking companion names or location descriptions in the display line initiates talks or detailed views, with color-coded text signaling conversation (light blue) or danger (red).

== Plot ==
A boy (Note: The ID salesman, officiating the protagonist's wedding, pronounces him and his bride "man and wife".) plagued by recurring nightmares seeks help from the eccentric Dr. Sigmund Fraud, who wires him up to a bizarre machine and determines that a monstrous "beast" is tormenting his sleep. Fraud prescribes a strange liquid that will send the boy to a dream world in which he can slay the beast, warning him that failure to do so means never waking up. Before going to sleep, the boy sneaks a water gun from his brother's toy chest after bribing him with money. Upon falling asleep, the boy enters a surreal landscape, with the beast preventing his return.

To enter the Rigor Mortis Saloon, the boy must buy a fake ID from an anthropomorphic fox hustler in a nearby alley, who requires a form from the Department of Information to make the sale. The boy navigates the labyrinthine building, a bureaucracy inhabited by pig officers, in search of the form. In the dream world, his water gun takes on a lethal quality, allowing him to shoot uncooperative officers and retrieve the form. In the saloon, the boy trades a holy wafer for a keg of beer, emptying it for a thirsty crowd.

The boy happens upon the dock of an oriental palace, where only married couples are permitted to swim. Upon swearing, the boy is teleported to the Department of Information's romper room, where he is made to repent. Here, he proposes to a girl in a crowd of people who had gotten lost attempting to acquire the same form he had. The two marry in the secular church, with the fox hustler officiating the union. With his new privilege, the boy swims to an underwater cave, where he encounters a rat and trades the empty keg for a pearl that displays maps.

The boy buys a loan of tuna from a literal loan shark, allowing him to buy a ticket onto an airship bound for the Castle in the Clouds. The pearl allows the captain to navigate to the Castle, where the boy shoots a drunkard for his bottle of acidic wine and collects a key for the door back to the real world. The boy confronts the beast, using the wine to dissolve him. He unlocks his bedroom door and wakes up. Feeling guilty, the boy returns his brother's water gun, for which he receives a hug.

== Development and release ==
Following the success of their previous title Ski Crazed (1987), JAM Software founders Andy Gavin and Jason Rubin continued their relationship with publisher Baudville and began development on Dream Zone. The game was jointly designed and written by Gavin and Rubin, with Gavin programming the game and Rubin creating the graphics. The music was composed by Sarah Sidman. The game's introduction features black and white digitized graphics depicting the real world, with the dream world scenes conveyed in color by Rubin's hand-drawn illustrations, an effect that Gavin compared to The Wizard of Oz (1939).

Dream Zone was released for the Apple II and Apple IIGS in the second quarter of 1988, for MS-DOS in November 1988, and for the Amiga and Atari ST in December 1988. It was JAM Software's first game to be released outside the Apple II platform.

== Reception and sales ==
Reception

Review scores
Publication	Score
Amiga User International	8/10
Computer and Video Games	88%
Dragon	5/5
Zzap!64	39%
Commodore User	9/10

Dream Zone was met with a generally positive reception upon release. James V. Trunzo of Compute! predicted praise or condemnation from players based on taste, but proclaimed that delight for the aesthetics would be undeniable. Hartley, Patricia and Kirk Lesser of Dragon deemed it excellent and playable for all levels, anticipating future works from the young developers. Keith Campbell of Computer and Video Games called it offbeat and trapping, urging more from the publisher. Shay Addams of Compute! enjoyed the hassle-free experience provided by the parser. Uwe Winkelkötter of Aktueller Software Markt rated the price-performance ratio acceptable for its "crazy" story and fun gameplay. Julia Forester of Amiga User International "grudgingly but highly" recommended it for adults. However, "Chuck Vomit" of Zzap!64 advised avoiding it as mediocre and boring, and "The Pilgrim" of ACE found it merely playable and gave no strong endorsement.

Reviewers consistently highlighted the game's success in evoking a dream-like state through bizarre, illogical scenarios and satirical elements. Trunzo, citing the game's Orwellian animal characters and bureaucratic absurdity, described the experience as "confusing, illogically logical, and frustrating" in a manner that mirrors a foggy nightmare, while Campbell and Commodore User noted the transformation from drab reality to vibrant, fantastical locations such as suspended pathways, a floating castle, and an amusement park. The Lessers praised the thought-provoking strangeness provided by the nightmarish creatures, magic, and troublesome bureaucracy. Forester and Winkelkötter emphasized the outlandish fantasy and original atmosphere, with Forester appreciating the black humor and Winkelkötter calling the story unprecedented, pointing out that Weird Dreams (1989) had not yet been released.

The presentation was well regarded. Trunzo praised both the black-and-white reality and colored dream graphics as stunning and hardware-pushing, and considered the music equally delightful. The Lessers commended the "fantastic" stereo sound, "superb" score, enhanced graphics, and "wonderful" animation. Campbell lauded the visuals as brilliant, attractive, and full of interest, and described the music as catchy and moody. Addams highlighted the diverse characters and locales, which were enhanced by the vivid graphics and animation. Forester rated the pictures as average overall, describing the opening digitized stills as "magnificent" and the dream sequences as "quite ghastly" but vividly colored. Winkelkötter described the graphics as good but not outstanding, with consistent and varied audio being a positive. Commodore User noted the initial disappointment with the "drab" monochrome photos gave way in the face of the subsequent colorful settings.

The difficulty of the puzzles was acknowledged. Trunzo warned of convoluted, difficult puzzles with subtle clues, requiring bizarre solutions. The Lessers depicted hours of concentrated effort amid "destructive" surprises, recommending frequent saves. Forester ranked the puzzles highly, comparing them to Infocom's, but criticized the primitive parsing and brief descriptions. Campbell detailed the frustrating bureaucratic chases and form collections, with some areas hard to access despite hints. Winkelkötter acknowledged the tough challenges and "nasty" traps but found the parser's vocabulary sufficient. In contrast, Chuck Vomit condemned the puzzles as repetitive, pointless, and lacking creativity, and The Pilgrim found the tasks dull and lacking true challenge or adrenaline.

Reception to the humor and content was mixed. Trunzo appreciated the unique satire and noted the forced stealing or killing, which he considered justified within the dream context. Forester labeled it "rude, lewd, and lack[ing] any obvious sense of moral value", yet deemed it great fun for adults due to its "cutting" black humor. Campbell found the game amusing and satirical, calling it "a breath of fresh air". Chuck Vomit dismissed the subconscious elements as unexciting reflections of average teenage fantasies. The Pilgrim critiqued the humor as shallow and the character interactions as unsatisfying.

The game was a modest commercial success, selling upwards of 10,000 copies and earning the developers about $15,000. However, Gavin and Rubin were dissatisfied with Baudville's limited marketing and distribution (and perceived the company as too laid-back and small-scale), and decided to part ways with the publisher during their high school senior year. Driven by their game development ambitions, the duo cold called Electronic Arts, to whom they sent a copy of Dream Zone and from whom they obtained a contract. Dream Zone was the last game released under the JAM Software name, with the company formally adopting the name Naughty Dog for their next game, Keef the Thief (1989).
