= Andy Gavin =

American video game programmer

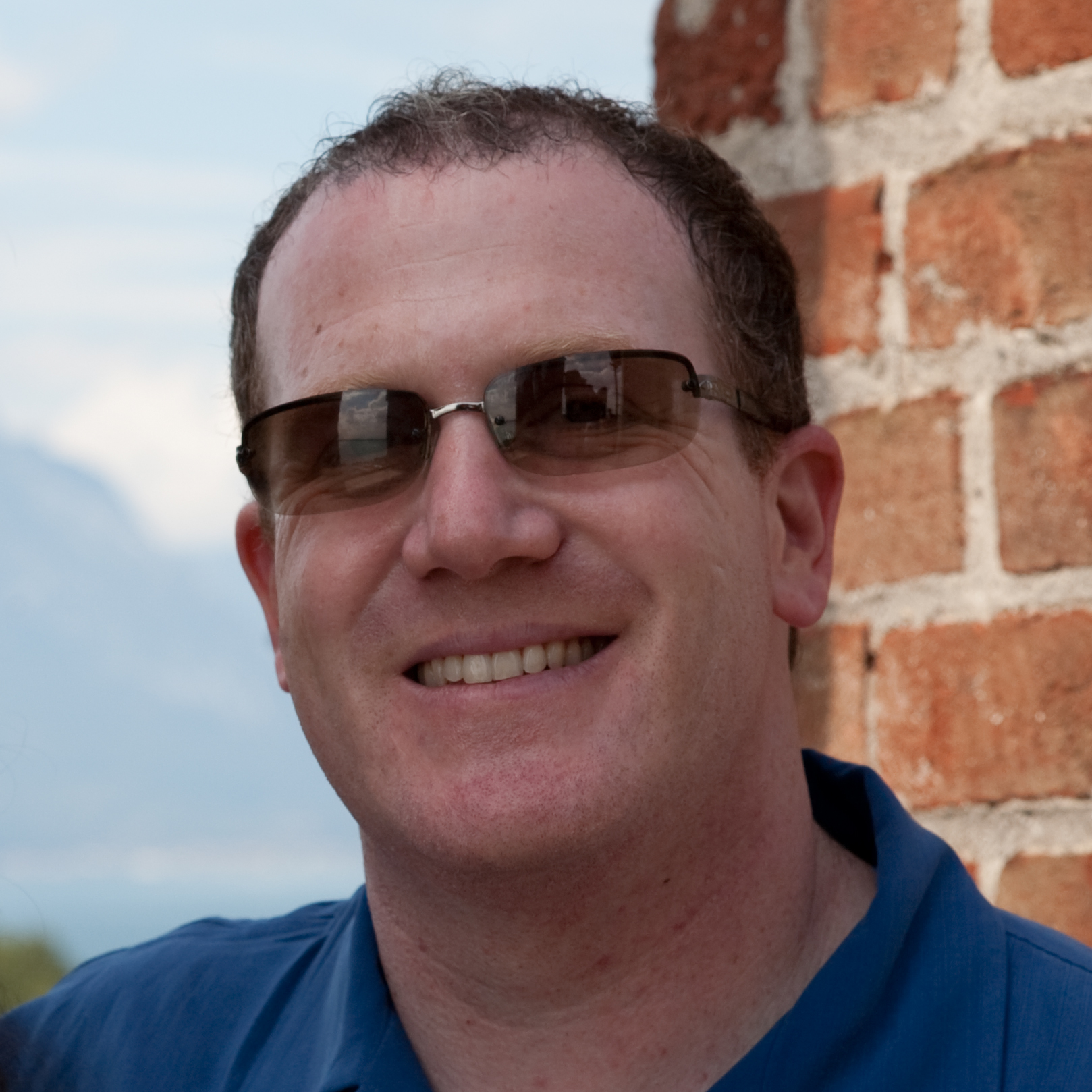
- Gavin in 2009
- Born: Andrew Scott Gavin; June 11, 1970 (age 56); Washington, D.C., U.S.
- Education: Haverford College (BS); Massachusetts Institute of Technology (PhD)
- Occupations: Entrepreneur; game designer; novelist; programmer
- Years active: 1984–present
- Employer: Naughty Dog (1984–2004)
- Website: all-things-andy-gavin.com

Andrew Scott Gavin (born June 11, 1970) is an American video game programmer, entrepreneur, and novelist. Gavin co-founded the video game company Naughty Dog with childhood friend Jason Rubin in 1986, which released games including Crash Bandicoot and Jak and Daxter. Prior to founding Naughty Dog, Gavin worked in the LISP programming language at the MIT Artificial Intelligence Laboratory.

== Education ==
Gavin earned a Bachelor of Science in Neurobiological Science from Haverford College. He studied for a Ph.D. at the Massachusetts Institute of Technology, conducting research for the Jet Propulsion Laboratory on the Mars Rover Vision Project, under advisor Rod Brooks. As a student, Gavin learned the LISP computer programming language, and developed a number of custom programming languages that were later used for the graphics, controls, sounds, and artificial intelligence in Naughty Dog video games.

== Career ==
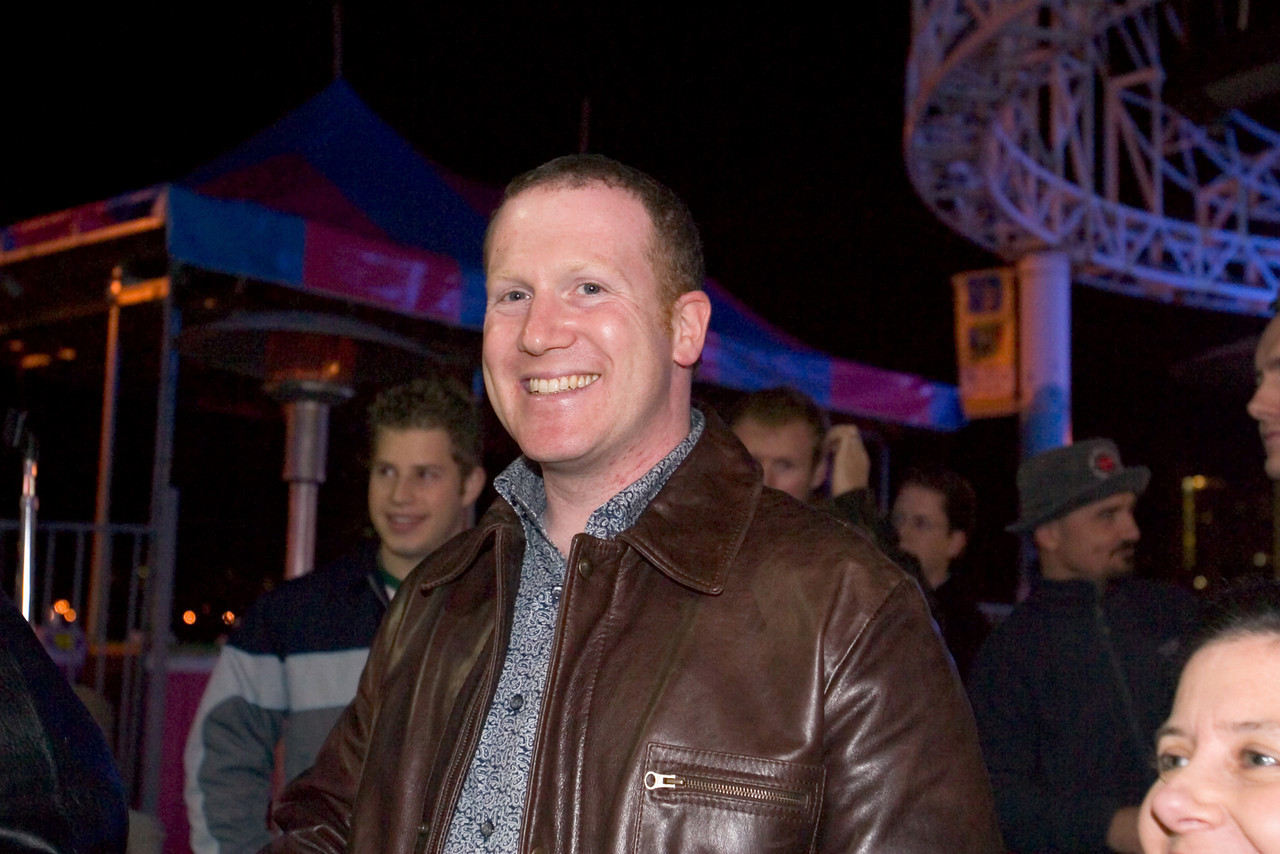
Gavin at The Naughty Dog Wrap Party, Santa Monica, CA, 2009

Gavin and Rubin sold their first video game, Maths Jam, in 1985. In 1989, they sold Keef the Thief to Electronic Arts. In the early 1990s, their fighting game, Way of the Warrior, led to a multi-title deal with Universal Interactive Studios. Under the auspices of this Universal deal they produced the Crash Bandicoot series from 1996 until 1999, and later the Jak and Daxter series. At the end of 2000, Rubin and Gavin sold Naughty Dog to Sony Computer Entertainment America (SCEA), having released 14 Naughty Dog games, which together sold over 35 million units and generated over $1 billion in revenue.

While at Naughty Dog, Gavin developed two LISP dialects for use in game development, Game Oriented Object Lisp (GOOL) and its successor Game Oriented Assembly Lisp (GOAL). These included innovations in terms of language choice and design.

Shortly after leaving Naughty Dog in 2004, Gavin and Rubin co-founded a new Internet startup called Flektor with former HBO executive Jason R. Kay. In May 2007, the company was sold to Fox Interactive Media, a division of News Corp. Fox described the company as "a next-generation website that provides users with a suite of web-based tools to transform their photos and videos into dynamic slideshows, postcards, live interactive presentations, and video mash-ups." In October 2007, Flektor partnered sister company MySpace, and MTV to provide instant audience feedback via polls for the interactive MySpace / MTV Presidential Dialogues series with Senator and presidential candidate Barack Obama.

Gavin left Fox Interactive Media in 2008. In 2009, he and Rubin announced a new social game startup called Monkey Gods, which was working on a new version of Snood along with a casual word game called MonkWerks.

Gavin also released a dark historical fantasy novel, The Darkening Dream, published in December 2011. His second novel Untimed, which involves time travel, was released on December 19, 2012.

Gavin co-founded Persona AI in 2023 with Scott Shumaker, with First Round Capital and Battery as investors. Persona was acquired by Luma Labs in 2026.

== Works ==
=== Games ===
Game title	Release	Platform	Role
Math Jam	1985	Apple II	Programmer
Ski Crazed	1986	Apple II	Programmer
Dream Zone	1987	Amiga, Apple II	Programmer
Keef the Thief	1989	Amiga, Apple II, Mega Drive/Genesis	Programmer
Rings of Power	1991	Mega Drive/Genesis	Programmer/Designer
Way of the Warrior	1994	3DO	Producer/Programmer/Designer
Crash Bandicoot	1996	PlayStation	Producer/Lead Programmer/Designer
Crash Bandicoot 2: Cortex Strikes Back	1997	PlayStation	Producer/Lead Programmer/Designer
Crash Bandicoot: Warped	1998	PlayStation	Producer/Lead Programmer/Designer
Crash Team Racing	1999	PlayStation	Chief Technology Officer
Jak and Daxter: The Precursor Legacy	2001	PlayStation 2	Producer/Lead Programmer/Designer
Jak II	2003	PlayStation 2	Producer/Lead Programmer/Designer
Jak 3	2004	PlayStation 2	Producer/Lead Programmer/Designer
Jak X: Combat Racing	2005	PlayStation 2	Extra Special Thanks
Daxter	2006	PlayStation Portable	Special Thanks
Uncharted: Drake's Fortune	2007	PlayStation 3	Special Thanks

=== Bibliography ===
Title	Release	Genre
The Darkening Dream	2011	Dark fantasy
Untimed	2012	Time travel
