= Naughty Dog =

American video game developer

Naughty Dog, LLC
- Formerly: JAM Software, Inc. (1984–1989); Naughty Dog, Inc. (1989–2015)
- Type: Subsidiary
- Industry: Video games
- Founded: 1984; 42 years ago in McLean, Virginia, US
- Founders: Andy Gavin; Jason Rubin
- Headquarters: Santa Monica, California, US
- Key people: Neil Druckmann (studio head, head of creative); Alison Mori (studio manager)
- Products: Crash Bandicoot (1996–1999); Jak and Daxter (2001–2005); Uncharted (2007–2022); The Last of Us (2013–present); Intergalactic (forthcoming)
- Number of employees: 400+ (July 2023)
- Parent: Sony Computer Entertainment (2001–05); PlayStation Studios (2005–present)
- Website: naughtydog.com

Naughty Dog, LLC (formerly JAM Software, Inc.) is an American first-party video game developer based in Santa Monica, California. Founded by Andy Gavin and Jason Rubin in 1984, the studio was acquired by Sony Computer Entertainment in 2001. Gavin and Rubin produced a sequence of progressively more successful games, including Rings of Power and Way of the Warrior in the early 1990s. The latter game prompted Universal Interactive Studios to sign the duo to a three-title contract and fund the expansion of the company.

After designer and producer Mark Cerny convinced Naughty Dog to create a character-based platform game that would use the 3D capabilities of the new systems, Naughty Dog created Crash Bandicoot for the PlayStation in 1996. Naughty Dog developed three Crash Bandicoot games over the next several years. After developing Crash Team Racing, the company began working on Jak and Daxter: The Precursor Legacy for the PlayStation 2.

In 2004, Gavin and Rubin left the company to co-found a new Internet startup called Flektor. In addition to its inhouse game team, Naughty Dog is also home to the ICE Team, one of PlayStation Studios's central technology groups. The company's first PlayStation 3 game, Uncharted: Drake's Fortune, was released in 2007, followed by several sequels and spin-off titles. This lasted until Naughty Dog announced a new intellectual property for the PlayStation 3, The Last of Us, which was in development by a secondary team at the studio and released to critical acclaim in 2013 which spawned a franchise. The Last of Us Part II was released for the PlayStation 4 in 2020 to similar acclaim. The studio is developing Intergalactic: The Heretic Prophet for the PlayStation 5.

== History ==
=== As JAM Software (1984–1988) ===
Jason Rubin (left) and Andy Gavin (right) co-founded Naughty Dog.

Naughty Dog was founded as "JAM Software" in 1984 by high school students Jason Rubin, Andy Gavin, and Mike Goyet. Rubin and Gavin met as pre-teens in 1982 at a weekend Hebrew school in Virginia. After they discovered a mutual interest in computers and video games, they began regularly discussing programming, game development, and game piracy during class. The acronym "JAM" originally stood for "Jason, Andy and Mike"; however, within months, Goyet became uninterested in the work and did not contribute to JAM's operations, prompting Rubin and Gavin to buy back his share of the company for about US$100, and the acronym was redefined as "Jason and Andy's Magic". Having experimented with Lisp and C++, Rubin and Gavin chose to create software for the Apple II. They initially operated from their homes with financial support from their parents.

The company's debut title, Math Jam, was a self-published educational game designed to teach basic arithmetic, and was sold to local schools packaged in Ziploc bags. Shifting their focus to entertainment titles, they attempted a number of projects, including a nearly-finished golf game that was accidentally overwritten. Their second title, a skiing game originally titled Ski Stud and later titled Ski Crazed, was sold to publisher Baudville for $250 and released in 1987; it was JAM's first commercial game, and sold more than 1,000 copies. Their next title was Dream Zone (1988), a graphic adventure game about a boy who must escape from a surreal dream world by vanquishing a beast causing his recurring nightmares. It was JAM's first game to be released outside the Apple II platform, being ported to the MS-DOS, Amiga, and Atari ST. While the game was successful, Rubin and Gavin grew dissatisfied with Baudville's limited marketing and distribution, and parted ways with the publisher.

=== Early titles as Naughty Dog (1989-1995) ===
The original logo used for Naughty Dog

Rubin and Gavin cold called game publisher Electronic Arts (EA) and secured a contract with them after sending a copy of Dream Zone. Their next game, Keef the Thief, was a graphic adventure with role-playing elements featuring a banished thief navigating a fantasy setting. During development, JAM Software was rebranded as Naughty Dog, with Keef the Thief being their first title to be released under the name. The name change was mandated by EA during the signing of their publishing agreement due to the JAM Software name being trademarked in Australia. The new name stemmed from a doodle by Rubin depicting a cartoon dog wearing sunglasses on a beach surrounded by women, which Rubin suggested as the company name despite initial reservations from Trip Hawkins about its marketability. Keef the Thief was released for the Amiga, Apple IIGS, and MS-DOS in 1989.

The commercial success of Keef the Thief prompted EA to commission Naughty Dog's next title, an ambitious role-playing game initially titled Buccaneer. As Rubin and Gavin were now college seniors in separate states, they traded information and data by modem, reconvening at Gavin's family home in Virginia during summers to continue work on the game. Buccaneer would eventually become Rings of Power, a role-playing game with isometric graphics that follows the apprentice sorcerer Buc, who must assemble a team of adventurers and collect eleven rings to defeat the evil god Void. The game was originally developed for the PC and Amiga, but shifted to the Sega Genesis after Gavin discovered EA's reverse-engineered Genesis development kits, making the game Naughty Dog's first console title. Rings of Power was released in 1992 to moderate commercial success, but EA's declination to reprint the game for economical reasons disillusioned Rubin and Gavin, and convinced them to take a brief hiatus from game development.

In 1993, Rubin and Gavin were approached by The 3DO Company founder Trip Hawkins and encouraged to develop a game for the 3DO console. Inspired by the popularity of fighting games, Naughty Dog developed Way of the Warrior, self-funding production with the money made from Rings of Power. After a financially straining development, Naughty Dog showcased the game at the Consumer Electronics Show, which won them a three-game contract with Universal Interactive Studios. Way of the Warrior was released in 1994 and sold modestly.

=== Crash Bandicoot (1996–2000) ===
Rubin and Gavin moved from Boston to Los Angeles to meet with Universal's Mark Cerny. They decided to create a three-dimensional character-based platform game for the PlayStation, taking into account its lack of a mascot. Production began after Naughty Dog signed a developer agreement with Sony and secured a development kit. The game, Crash Bandicoot, starred the titular genetically altered marsupial, who must foil the world domination plot of his creator Doctor Neo Cortex and rescue his girlfriend. Published by Sony Computer Entertainment, Crash Bandicoot was released in 1996 to commercial success, becoming one of the best-selling PlayStation games.

In 1997, Naughty Dog released Crash Bandicoot 2: Cortex Strikes Back, which introduced a hub-based level progression system and new vehicles for Crash to commandeer. It became one of the best-selling titles of 1998. Crash Bandicoot: Warped was developed in ten and a half months and features a time-traveling premise as well as new vehicles and techniques. It was released in 1998 and also met with commercial success. The kart racing game Crash Team Racing was developed in tandem with Warped and released in 1999.

=== Acquisition by Sony, Jak and Daxter (2001–2006) ===
In January 2001, Sony Computer Entertainment acquired Naughty Dog for an undisclosed sum, making the studio a wholly-owned first-party developer.. The sale was influenced by Naughty Dog's frustration over their lack of control over Crash Bandicoot and the financial burdens of independent development, with the acquisition securing the studio's financial stability and allowing them to focus on creative risks without the pressure of self-funding. Naughty Dog's new intellectual property, Jak and Daxter: The Precursor Legacy, began development during production of Crash Team Racing, with the team aiming to create a seamless open world without loading screens. The story features Jak, who must restore his transformed friend Daxter and stop a rogue sage from corrupting the world. The game was released in 2001 and sold over 2 million copies in North America.

Jak II was developed over two years, and features a darker narrative featuring Jak navigating a dystopian city to exact vengeance on its tyrannical baron. The game was released in 2003 and became Naughty Dog's fastest-selling title at the time.

=== Uncharted (2007–2012) ===
Naughty Dog co-presidents Christophe Balestra (left) and Evan Wells (right) in 2010

In 2007, Naughty Dog released the Uncharted series, and made its first approach to realistic worlds and characters, in contrast to its Crash Bandicoot and Jak and Daxter series, which featured fantastical worlds set in a fictional setting. The Uncharted franchise has been praised for its cinematic quality and technical proficiency, and has sold over 41 million copies worldwide as of December 2017.

In 2012 and 2013, Naughty Dog teamed with Mass Media Inc. to release the Jak and Daxter Collection. It contains high-definition ports of the original PlayStation 2 trilogy and was released for PlayStation 3 and PlayStation Vita respectively.

=== The Last of Us and Uncharted 4 (2013–2020) ===
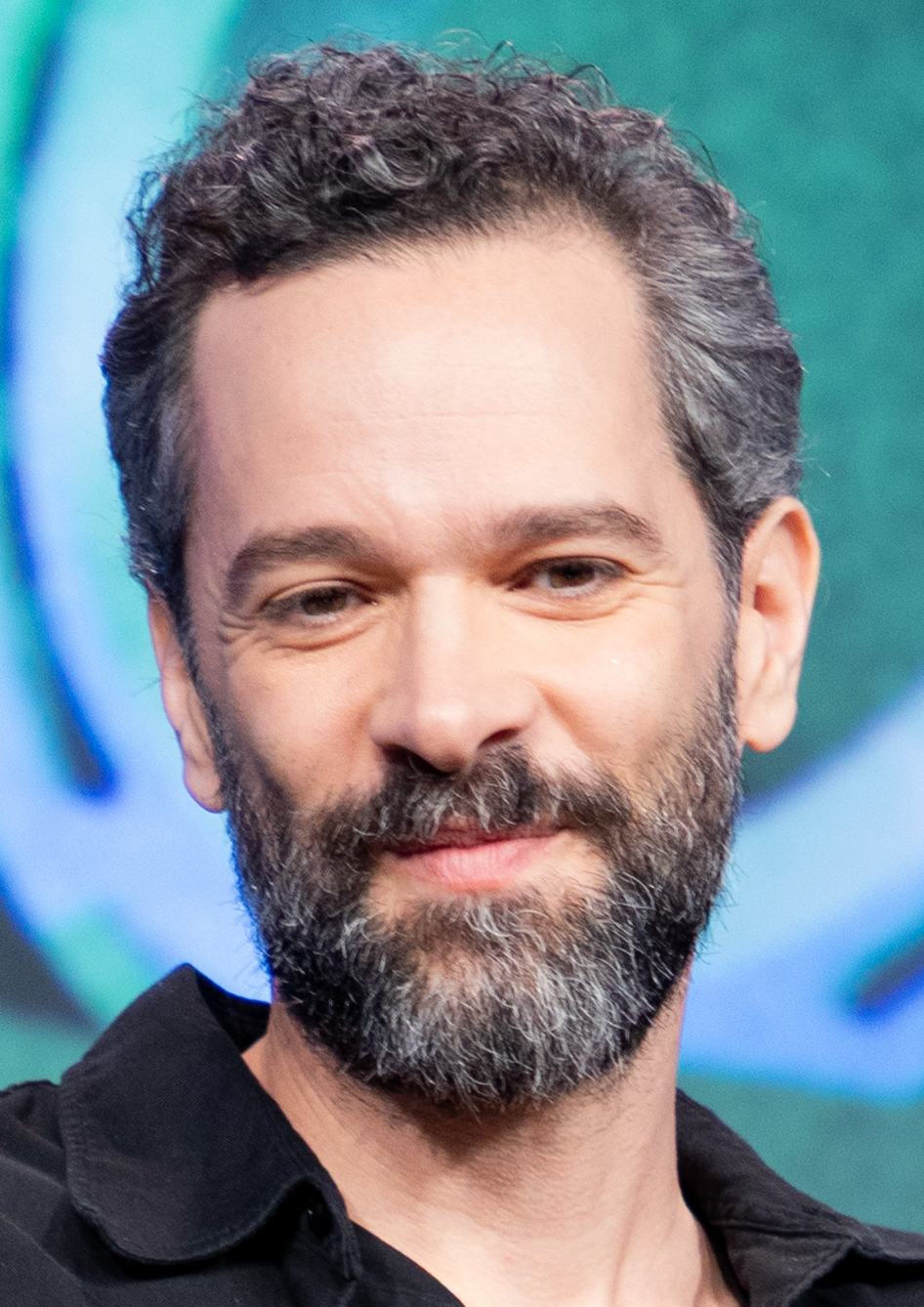
Neil Druckmann co-directed The Last of Us and Uncharted 4 before becoming vice president in 2018, co-president in 2020, and studio head in 2023.

The Last of Us was released in June 2013, and follows the journey of smuggler Joel and teenager Ellie across a post-apocalyptic United States. The game sold 17 million copies by 2018. In February 2014, Naughty Dog released The Last of Us: Left Behind, a DLC expansion exploring Ellie's past friendship with Riley. A remastered version of The Last of Us for the PlayStation 4 was announced in June 2014. Development on Uncharted 4: A Thief's End took place parallel to that of The Last of Us under the direction of Amy Hennig and Justin Richmond before their departure in 2014. Neil Druckmann and Bruce Straley restarted production, and the game was released in May 2016.

The Last of Us Part II entered development in 2014, and was announced at the 2016 PlayStation Experience event. In August 2017, Naughty Dog released Uncharted: The Lost Legacy, a standalone expansion of Uncharted 4. Following multiple delays, The Last of Us Part II was released in June 2020.

=== Post–The Last of Us Part II developments (2021–present) ===
In June 2022, Naughty Dog announced that the multiplayer component of The Last of Us Part II would be developed as a standalone game set in The Last of Us universe. Druckmann described its scope as equal to Naughty Dog's single-player games and said it would feature new characters and a different American location. Development of The Last of Us Online, which spanned seven years, was scaled back in May 2023 after Sony's consultation with Bungie, which raised questions of the game's ability to maintain player engagement. Company layoffs in October 2023 eliminated at least 25 contractual positions without severance, mostly in quality assurance. Production of The Last of Us Online was canceled in December 2023; the decision was motivated by Bungie's review, which convinced Naughty Dog that the game's scope would affect the studio's future ability to develop single-player games.

The Last of Us Part II Remastered, which features new gameplay modes, was released in January 2024. It was ported to Windows in April 2025, and an update was released in July 2025, allowing the game's narrative events to be played in linear order. Naughty Dog considered working on a third The Last of Us game in the series after Part II and spent time prototyping ideas before deciding to work on Intergalactic: The Heretic Prophet. The studio revealed Intergalactic in December 2024.

== Key personnel ==
Andy Gavin and Jason Rubin founded Naughty Dog as teenagers in 1984, with Gavin handling programming and Rubin acting as artist. In 2002, Gavin and Rubin made the decision to leave Naughty Dog and began a two-year handover of leadership to Evan Wells and Stephen White in preparation for their departure. Gavin and Rubin left Naughty Dog in October 2004 upon the completion of Jak 3. Evan Wells, who had joined Naughty Dog in 1998 during the production of Crash Bandicoot: Warped, assumed the role of co-president in 2005 alongside Stephen White; in 2006, White was succeeded by Christophe Balestra, who had joined the studio around 2002.

On November 23, 2013, Corrinne Yu, principal engine architect at Microsoft's Halo 4 developer 343 Industries, announced that she had joined Naughty Dog. On March 4, 2014, Uncharted lead writer Amy Hennig left the studio.

In March 2017, Balestra announced that he would retire his role as co-president on April 3, 2017, after working at the company for fifteen years. Wells remained in his role as president. In September 2017, game director Bruce Straley announced his departure from Naughty Dog following a sabbatical, stating he "found [his] energy focusing in other directions". Neil Druckmann was promoted to vice president in March 2018.

Druckmann was promoted to co-president alongside Wells on December 4, 2020; Alison Mori, formerly the director of operations, and Christian Gyrling, the former co-director of programming, were promoted to co-vice presidents in his place. On October 4, 2021, director of communications Arne Meyer announced that he had been promoted to co-vice president. In July 2022, Josh Scherr announced his departure from Naughty Dog after 21 years with the company. In July 2023, Wells announced he would retire from the studio by the year's end. Simultaneously, Druckmann became studio head and head of creative, with Mori promoted to studio manager and head of operations, Meyer to head of culture and communications, and Gyrling to head of technology. The leadership team was expanded further, with Erick Pangilinan and Jeremy Yates becoming co-heads of the art departments, and Anthony Newman to head of production and design. Gyrling departed the company after 17 years in November 2023, replaced as head of technology by Travis McIntosh.

== Games developed ==
As a subsidiary of Sony Computer Entertainment, Naughty Dog is best known for developing games for the PlayStation consoles, including the Crash Bandicoot series for the original PlayStation, Jak and Daxter on PlayStation 2, and Uncharted and The Last of Us on PlayStation 3, PlayStation 4, and PlayStation 5. Before this, it also developed games including Dream Zone, Keef the Thief, Rings of Power and Way of the Warrior.

List of games developed by Naughty Dog
Year	Title	Platform(s)	Ref.
1986	Math Jam	Apple II	
1987	Ski Crazed	Apple II	
1988	Dream Zone	Amiga, Apple IIGS, Atari ST, MS-DOS	
1989	Keef the Thief	Amiga, Apple IIGS, MS-DOS	
1992	Rings of Power	Genesis	
1994	Way of the Warrior	3DO	
1996	Crash Bandicoot	PlayStation	
1997	Crash Bandicoot 2: Cortex Strikes Back	PlayStation	
1998	Crash Bandicoot: Warped	PlayStation	
1999	Crash Team Racing	PlayStation	
2001	Jak and Daxter: The Precursor Legacy	PlayStation 2	
2003	Jak II	PlayStation 2	
2004	Jak 3	PlayStation 2	
2005	Jak X: Combat Racing	PlayStation 2	
2007	Uncharted: Drake's Fortune	PlayStation 3	
2009	Uncharted 2: Among Thieves	PlayStation 3	
2011	Uncharted 3: Drake's Deception	PlayStation 3	
2013	The Last of Us	PlayStation 3	
2014	The Last of Us: Left Behind	PlayStation 3, PlayStation 4	
2014	The Last of Us Remastered	PlayStation 4	
2016	Uncharted 4: A Thief's End	PlayStation 4	
2017	Uncharted: The Lost Legacy	PlayStation 4	
2020	The Last of Us Part II	PlayStation 4	
2022	Uncharted: Legacy of Thieves Collection	PlayStation 5, Windows	
2022	The Last of Us Part I	PlayStation 5, Windows	
2024	The Last of Us Part II Remastered	PlayStation 5, Windows	
TBA	Intergalactic: The Heretic Prophet	PlayStation 5	

== Technology and philosophy ==
During the development of Crash Bandicoot, Naughty Dog created Game Oriented Object Lisp (GOOL), a compiled Lisp dialect designed by Andy Gavin to address limitations in standard languages for authoring in-game objects. GOOL was employed to code the characters and gameplay of Crash Bandicoot, and allowed new characters and objects to be quickly prototyped. Starting in 2001, it was succeeded by Game Oriented Assembly Lisp (GOAL) for the Jak and Daxter titles. Since the development of Uncharted: Drake's Fortune, Naughty Dog has maintained a proprietary in-house game engine that has powered titles in the Uncharted and The Last of Us series.

Naughty Dog is known for its unique way of handling game development. The studio did not have a producer and relied on minimal middle-management, though it hired a team of producers around 2021 (growing to 17 producers by 2022) to help combat crunch.

Naughty Dog is home to the ICE Team, one of Sony's World Wide Studios central technology groups. The term ICE originally stood for Initiative for a Common Engine, which describes the original purpose of the studio. The ICE Team focuses on creating core graphics technologies for Sony's worldwide first party published titles, including low level game engine components, graphics processing pipelines, supporting tools, and graphics profiling and debugging tools. The ICE Team also supports third party developers with a suite of engine components, and a graphics analysis, profiling, and debugging tool for the RSX. Both enable developers to get better performance out of PlayStation hardware.

== Awards ==
The original Crash Bandicoot received "Game of the Month" distinctions from Electronic Gaming Monthly and GameFan, while Jak and Daxter: The Precursor Legacy was named Best Platformer in IGN's PS2 Game of the Year Awards. Uncharted 2: Among Thieves earned over 200 Game of the Year awards and four British Academy Games Awards, including Best Story, Best Action, Best Use of Audio, and Best Original Score. The Last of Us claimed Game of the Year alongside nine other categories at the 17th Annual D.I.C.E. Awards, and won the Writers Guild of America Award for Outstanding Achievement in Videogame Writing. Uncharted 4: A Thief's End won the British Academy Games Award for Best Game in 2017, as well as Adventure Game of the Year and Outstanding Achievements in Animation, Story, and Technical at the 20th Annual D.I.C.E. Awards. The Last of Us Part II swept The Game Awards 2020 with victories in Game of the Year, Best Game Direction, Best Narrative, Best Audio Design, Best Innovation in Accessibility, Best Action/Adventure, and Best Performance (for Laura Bailey as Abby). Naughty Dog won the Studio of the Year award at the 2013 VGX, the 2013 Golden Joystick Awards, and the 2020 Golden Joystick Awards.

== Controversies and criticism ==
In October 2017, former employee David Ballard alleged that he was terminated the day after informing PlayStation's HR department about experiencing sexual harassment by a senior team member while working at Naughty Dog in late 2015; he was supposedly offered $20,000 to remain silent but declined. Naughty Dog responded that it had "not found any evidence of having received allegations from Mr. Ballard that he was harassed in any way".

Naughty Dog has faced criticism for its crunch culture, with late-stage development on its projects often marked by extended overtime periods. Former employees detailed working 12-hour days and weekends, even after The Last of Us Part II was delayed from 2019 to 2020, with salaried employees receiving no additional compensation for overtime beyond their base pay. While crunch was expected rather than mandated, the workload, peer pressure, and risk to career progression played roles in fostering this environment. Evan Wells and Neil Druckmann acknowledged the problem in a 2021 Game Informer interview, with Druckmann stating there was "no one solution" to eliminating crunch and Wells claiming that attempted measures to limit employees' work time proved frustrating to those willing to work on their own volition. Jason Schreier and Obsidian Entertainment writer Carrie Patel criticized their equation of passionate work to long hours, with Patel elaborating that the culture creates a "martyr mentality" that breaks down communication and collaboration amongst a development team. In a 2024 documentary, Naughty Dog publicly affirmed its reputation for crunch and pledged to avoid it moving forward.
