= Jason Rubin =

American video game director (born 1970)

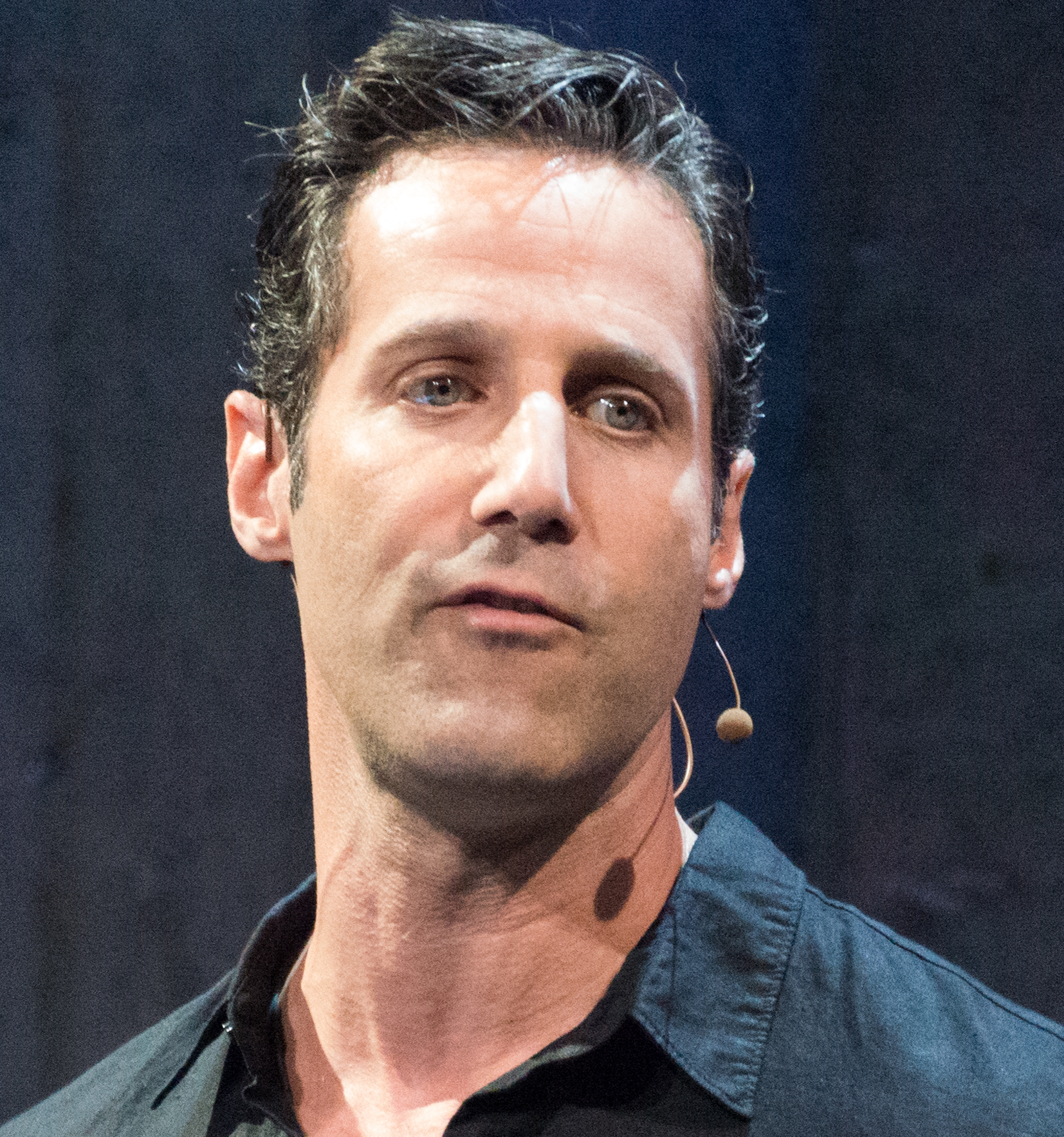
- Rubin speaking at Step into the Rift, 2015
- Born: 1970 (age 55–56)
- Education: University of Michigan
- Occupations: Video game director; writer; comic book creator
- Years active: 1984–present
- Employers: Naughty Dog (1984–2004); THQ (2012–2013); Facebook / Meta (2014–2026)
- Website: https://jasonrubin.com

Jason Rubin (born 1970) is an American video game director, writer, and comic book creator. He is best known for the Crash Bandicoot and Jak and Daxter series of games which were produced by Naughty Dog, the game development studio he co-founded with partner and childhood friend Andy Gavin in 1984. He was the president of THQ before its closure due to bankruptcy on January 23, 2013. Rubin is the vice president of Metaverse Content at Meta Platforms.

== Career ==
Rubin and Andy Gavin formed Naughty Dog in 1984. Later that year, they published their first game together — a budgetware title called Ski Crazed. In 1989, Rubin and Gavin sold their first game to Electronic Arts: a role-playing game called Keef the Thief. He took a brief hiatus from school and game design to move to Los Angeles and attempt a career as a screenwriter, but after little success, he returned to school and game design.

While Gavin was an undergraduate in Haverford College and Rubin was attending the University of Michigan, they collaborated with each other on their next title: a role-playing game called Rings of Power. The game began as a PC title, but during meetings at Electronic Arts Gavin spotted a reverse engineered Sega Genesis, pitched a slightly modified version of the title to Trip Hawkins, and the title became the duo's first console game. Rings of Power still has a cult following today.

After much persuasion from Hawkins, Rubin and Gavin took a leap of faith and started designing Way of the Warrior, which was heavily inspired by Mortal Kombat, for the 3DO console. They demoed the game at CES and received interest from Skip Paul, former chairman of Atari's Coin-Op division and then head of the new Universal Interactive Studios. Skip signed the pair to a three title development deal at Universal, moving them out to the Universal Studios lot and introducing them to Mark Cerny, who worked with the pair on the design of their next title, which was a "Donkey Kong Country-inspired" 3D platformer called Crash Bandicoot.

Crash Bandicoot turned out to be an enormous success, and Sony used the main character as their unofficial PlayStation mascot for several years. Due to the impressive visuals which the developer was able to achieve from the PlayStation console, the game served as a quality benchmark that all other game developers aimed to match, and the series spawned three sequels by Naughty Dog selling over 26 million units. The series continues with other development teams, having sold more than 40 million units worldwide.

After their success with Crash Bandicoot, Rubin and Gavin began working on Jak and Daxter, a franchise that sold 9 million units through the various Naughty Dog incarnations. The series continued with other developers and as of 2017 had sold 15 million copies sold worldwide. Before Jak and Daxter's release, Sony purchased Naughty Dog, which became a wholly owned subsidiary of Sony Computer Entertainment America in 2001. As a result, Jak and Daxter: The Precursor Legacy was developed exclusively for the PlayStation 2.

In their 18 years running Naughty Dog, they created fourteen original games including Math Jam (1985), Ski Crazed (1986), Dream Zone (1987), Keef the Thief (1989), Rings of Power (1991), Way of the Warrior (1994), Crash Bandicoot (1996), Crash Bandicoot 2: Cortex Strikes Back (1997), Crash Bandicoot: Warped (1998), Crash Team Racing (1999), Jak and Daxter: The Precursor Legacy (2001), Jak II (2003), Jak 3 (2004) and Jak X: Combat Racing (2005). Together these games have sold over 35 million units and generated over $1 billion in revenue.

Just days after making a controversial speech at 2004's D.I.C.E. Summit that criticized publishers for not recognizing and promoting talent responsible for creating games, Rubin publicly announced his departure from Naughty Dog.

On May 29, 2012, Rubin joined video game publisher, THQ as president. At the time Rubin joined THQ, the company had laid off hundreds of its employees and the stock had lost over 99% of its value from its high.

To save the teams and products management took the company through a restructuring. As part of that process, THQ filed for Chapter 11 with the intention to sell off its assets at auction.

Soon after, THQ management announced a stalking horse bid for the company by Clear Lake Capital for $60 million. Handling the sale of THQ was Centerview Partners Skip Paul, a former colleague of Jason Rubin.

Creditors said the proposed sale of THQ in bankruptcy court benefited current THQ management, including Rubin. Early creditor objections and court documents were not kind to THQ management. The bankruptcy judge dismissed this argument. Creditors later released THQ management, including Rubin, of any malfeasance in the company's Official Plan of Liquidation

Rubin said at the time that the company was actively seeking higher bids:

Our Chapter 11 process allows for other bidders to make competing offers for THQ. So while we are extremely excited about the Clearlake [stalking horse] opportunity, we won't be able to say that the deal is done for a month or so. Whatever happens, the teams and products look likely to end up together and in good hands. That means you can still pre-order Metro: Last Light, Company of Heroes 2, and South Park: The Stick of Truth. Our teams are still working on those titles as you read this, and all other rumored titles, like the fourth Saints Row, the Homefront sequel, and a lot more are also still in the works.

— Jason Rubin, THQ Press Release

Judge Mary F. Walrath decided to have an auction for the individual assets, and competing offers for the separate parts of THQ prevailed. Though many employees lost their jobs in the bankruptcy, the development teams at Relic (bought by Sega), Volition (bought by Koch Media), and THQ Montreal (purchased by Ubisoft) remained intact, as did much of Vigil which became Crytek USA, and all of the THQ products in the works survived the bankruptcy have come or are scheduled to come out soon.

In December 2012, THQ partnered up with The Humble Bundle Team at Wolfire Games to make the Humble THQ Bundle raising over $5 million, much of it going to charity. Rubin donated over $10,000 to charity as part of the event.

During E3 2014 it was announced that Rubin joined Oculus VR, heading up the Oculus first-party content initiatives in Seattle, San Francisco, Menlo Park, Dallas and Irvine.

In 2021, following Oculus parent company Facebook's rebranding as Meta, Rubin became VP of Metaverse Content, leading the company's VR and Metaverse Content production teams, the internal Studios, Publishing, and Developer Ecosystem teams. Rubin left Meta in March 2026.

== Other projects ==
Rubin also created two comic book series. The Iron Saint, originally known as Iron and the Maiden, was published by Aspen Comics, and including artwork designed by artists as Joe Madureira, Jeff Matsuda, Francis Manapul and Joel Gomez. "Mysterious Ways" was published by TopCow Comics and includes artwork from Tyler Kirkham.

Rubin also co-founded an Internet startup called Flektor with Naughty Dog co-founder Andy Gavin and former HBO executive Jason Kay. In May 2007, the company was sold to Fox Interactive Media, which is a division of News Corp. Fox described the company as: "a next-generation Web site that provides users with a suite of Web-based tools to transform their photos and videos into dynamic slideshows, postcards, live interactive presentations and video mash-ups." In October 2007, Flektor partnered with its sister company, Myspace, and MTV to provide instant audience feedback via polls for the interactive MySpace / MTV Presidential Dialogues series with then-presidential candidate Senator Barack Obama.

== Video games ==
Year	Game title	Role
1985	Math Jam	Lead programmer
1986	Ski Crazed	Lead programmer
1987	Dream Zone	Lead artist
1989	Keef the Thief	Director
1991	Rings of Power	Director, game designer
1994	Way of the Warrior	Director, producer, game designer
1996	Crash Bandicoot	Director
1997	Crash Bandicoot 2: Cortex Strikes Back	Director
1998	Crash Bandicoot 3: Warped	Director
1999	Crash Team Racing	Director
2001	Jak and Daxter: The Precursor Legacy	Director
2003	Jak II	Director
2004	Jak 3	Director
