= Keef the Thief =

1989 video game

- Developer: Naughty Dog
- Publisher: Electronic Arts
- Producer: Chris Wilson
- Designers: Andy Gavin; Jason Rubin
- Programmer: Andy Gavin
- Artist: Jason Rubin
- Writer: Andy Gavin
- Composer: Russ Turner
- Platforms: Apple IIGS, Amiga, MS-DOS
- Release: Apple IIGS, Amiga; October 1989; MS-DOS; November 1989
- Genres: Graphic adventure, role-playing
- Mode: Single-player

Keef the Thief: A Boy and His Lockpick is a 1989 graphic adventure role-playing video game developed by Naughty Dog and published by Electronic Arts for the Apple IIGS, Amiga, and MS-DOS.

== Gameplay ==
Keef converses with a character in an example of gameplay from Keef the Thief.

Keef the Thief is a graphic adventure game with role-playing elements. The player controls Keef, a banished thief navigating a continental setting known as the Tri-City Area. His objective is to rise from poverty to become God-King in the Tri-City Area. The game world comprises jungles, cities, dungeons, and historical sites tied to the legacy of Emperor Telloc, who ruled until his disappearance long ago. Key locations include Same Mercon (a prosperous trade city), Mem Santi (a temple with a maze housing an artifact), Tel Empor (a ruined palace), and Tel Hande (a fortress police state). A prophecy describes scattered powers hidden across the land, which the player must seek to restore balance against evil forces.

Keef the Thief employs a point-and-click interface driven by mouse or keyboard inputs, with context-sensitive menus and icons that adapt to the player's current situation. The screen is divided into distinct sections: an upper view window displaying locations, combat scenes, or spell-mixing cloths; a lower panel for command options such as Talk, Look, Search, Cast, and Steal; and side areas for status indicators, directional compasses, and tactical maps. Commands are activated by clicking icons or selecting from pull-down sub-menus, with the pointer changing shape to signal available actions like directions, doors, conversations, or attacks. The frequency and difficulty of monster encounters can be adjusted via a menu bar.

Keef's skills can be built with repeated thievery, combat, and magic use, and his strength, hit points, magic points, sleepiness, nutrition, and sobriety must be managed. He begins poorly equipped, with low hit points and armed only with his bare hands. Attributes and object placements randomize across new games. Scoring tracks performance in categories including treasure, magic, thieving, quest progress, and overall experience.

The player can steal valuables from unguarded houses or shops by entering buildings when patrols pass, activating a highlighted Steal option for viable targets. Failure triggers traps, resulting in injury or pursuits by guards, leading to capture or combat. The player can haggle for purchases, but theft builds a skill score in thieving, allowing the player to more covertly acquire weapons, armor, and reagents. Money and items can also be obtained from defeated enemies.

Combat takes place in real-time from a first-person perspective. In combat mode, the player's field of vision extends 45 degrees to either side ahead, and is supplemented by an overhead map showing enemy positions, a radar-like view indicator, and stats for hit points and weapons. Players can turn to face foes, advance to strike, or employ ranged attacks and spells. Spells must be prepared by mixing reagents on a dedicated cloth, following deciphered recipes. Spellbooks contain clues for spells like healing or illumination, which the player can use to combine common herbs from apothecaries or rare ingredients from expeditions. Successful mixes enable spellcasting if the player has enough magic points, while errors harm Keef or deplete resources.

== Plot ==
Keef, a young man raised in a provincial settlement after being abandoned as an infant at a holy temple, is formally exiled by the town's council for his incessantly disruptive behavior. Despite attempts to train him as a priest, warrior, and mage, Keef alienated all potential mentors and instead mastered thievery. He is escorted to the edge of the jungle and banished from the town, free to explore the broader Tri-City Area. With minimal possessions, Keef begins his journey, recalling fragments of local history and prophecy gathered from tavern conversations and personal notes.

The region's history centers on Emperor Telloc, who rose from humble origins through mastery of magic to become God-King. He conquered Mercon, renaming it Tel Mercon, and constructed grand edifices including the palace of Tel Empor, the fortress of Tel Hande, and other sites. His reign endured for centuries until a catastrophic flood and subsequent famine precipitated unrest. Telloc vanished amid a siege, fulfilling a prophecy by the seer Al Handratta. The ensuing era, known as the Emperor's Darkness, fragmented the realm: Tel Mercon became the prosperous Same Mercon; Tel Empor fell into ruins; Tel Hande became an isolated, militaristic state; and the forgotten jungle city of Tel Santi was transformed into the temple Mem Santi, housing a sacred artifact. The prophecy foretold the dispersal of Telloc's power into six aspects: wealth, love, wisdom, confidence, strength, and power. These fragments, embodied as artifacts, hold the key to restoring or claiming supreme authority. An evil Magician King in Tel Hande seeks to reassemble them for domination, while Keef pursues the same goal.

At the royal palace of Same Mercon, Keef gains favor with the princess by presenting a flower and retrieves the Arm of Wealth from the treasury. Traveling to the headwaters of the Tel Roca river, he encounters a mermaid mourning her lost love, Telloc. After recovering her ring from caves behind a waterfall, he obtains the Arm of Love. In a secluded beach hut, Keef meets the reclusive Al Handratta. By acquiring and trading a Clydesdale horse, he secures a key to the hut's underground halls, where he defeats a three-headed hydra and claims the Gem of Wisdom. At Mem Santi, Keef navigates a complex maze and seizes the Artifact of Mem after defeating its guardian. In the ruined palace of Tel Empor, he descends into a trap-filled dungeon, disarms its hazards, and acquires the Plate of Strength.

Keef infiltrates the halls of Tel Hande, obtains Telloc's skull, and confronts the Magician King in his tower. After defeating the sorcerer and claiming the Globe of Power, he returns to Tel Empor. There, he hurls Telloc's skull into an abyss, utters an incantation, and ascends a magical staircase to Telloc's ruined laboratory. Channeling energy through the six artifacts, he fuses them into a unified whole. Keef is crowned God-King of the land and marries a tavern waitress, with whom he has a son, Keef the Thief Jr. However, Jr. adopts the name Flem and forms a heavy metal band called Axe, Keef's wife departs, and the restless Keef resumes his adventurous ways.

== Development and release ==
Following the release of JAM Software's prior title, Dream Zone (1988), which sold approximately 10,000 copies, 17-year-old developers Andy Gavin and Jason Rubin sought a larger publisher. They contacted Electronic Arts (EA), a leading game publisher at the time, by cold calling its helpline and securing a contract after submitting a copy of Dream Zone. During the signing of their publishing agreement, it was discovered the JAM Software name was trademarked in Australia, requiring the company to change its name. The new name, Naughty Dog, stemmed from a doodle by Rubin depicting a cartoon dog wearing sunglasses on a beach surrounded by women, which Rubin suggested as the company name despite initial reservations from Trip Hawkins about its marketability. Keef the Thief became the first video game released by Naughty Dog under its current name. EA provided an initial advance of $15,000 plus 10 percent royalties per copy sold, though development costs ultimately reached about $48,000. Chris Wilson served as the game's producer. Originally envisioned as a serious role-playing game, Gavin incorporated sarcastic placeholder text during production. EA approved this humor, directing a shift toward a comedic tone and assigning an uncredited comedy writer. The game's music was composed by Russ Turner. Keef the Thief was released for the Amiga and Apple IIGS in October 1989, and for MS-DOS the following month. The PC and Amiga ports were handled by Vijay S. Pande and Alex Hinds. The game achieved commercial success, selling around 50,000 copies, strong relative to its budget, and prompting EA to commission a follow-up project, which would become Rings of Power (1992). However, Rubin regretted the comedic emphasis and cartoonish packaging, claiming it limited the game's appeal in a market unready for such an approach in the role-playing genre.

== Reception ==
Reception

Review scores
Publication	Score
ACE	850/1000
Amiga Action	74%
Amiga Computing	69%
Amiga Format	89%
Amiga Power	3/6
Commodore User	82%
Dragon	X
Génération 4	67%
The Games Machine (UK)	93%
VideoGames & Computer Entertainment	7/10
Zzap!64	77%

Keef the Thief was met with mixed reviews upon release. Hartley, Patricia, and Kirk Lesser of Dragon rated the game an "X" for "Not recommended" because of its antiquated copy-protection system.
