= Michael Ensign =

American actor

- Born: February 13, 1944 (age 82)
- Other name: Michael Evans
- Education: London Academy of Music and Dramatic Art (LAMDA)
- Occupation: Actor
- Years active: 1972–present

Michael Ensign (born February 13, 1944) is an American actor who has mostly played supporting roles. One of his most-known roles was Benjamin Guggenheim in the epic historical romance film Titanic (1997).

== Early life ==
Ensign, as Michael Evans, began his acting career as a child in Phoenix, Arizona, where he attended Arcadia High School. Ensign trained at the London Academy of Music and Dramatic Art (LAMDA) and spent the first ten years of his professional career working in the theatre in Britain.

== Career ==
He was a member of the Royal Shakespeare Company in the 1970s, appearing in productions of As You Like It, Love's Labour's Lost, and Cymbeline amongst others. He has appeared in Irene, Curse of the Starving Class, and The Red Devil Battery Sign in the West End.

Ensign's film credits include Superman (1978), Pink Floyd – The Wall (1982), WarGames (1983), Ghostbusters (1984), Dr. Hackenstein (1988), Titanic (1997), Solaris (2002), Bringing Down the House (2003), Down with Love (2003) and Seabiscuit (2003).

Ensign's many television appearances include Boston Legal, Three’s Company, Alias, Monk, JAG, CSI: Crime Scene Investigation, Star Trek: Enterprise, The X-Files, Friends, Star Trek: Voyager, Star Trek: Deep Space Nine, Star Trek: The Next Generation, MacGyver, Dynasty, Falcon Crest, M*A*S*H, The A-Team, and The Dukes Of Hazzard. He appeared in the TV miniseries The Winds of War and Dream West.

Ensign provided the voice of the villainous Doctor Nefarious Tropy in the video games Crash Bandicoot: Warped (1998), Crash Team Racing (1999), Crash Nitro Kart (2003) and Crash Twinsanity (2004). His role of N. Tropy was later passed down to Corey Burton, who voiced the character in Crash Bandicoot: The Wrath of Cortex (2001), Crash Bandicoot N. Sane Trilogy (2017), and Crash Team Racing Nitro-Fueled (2019), and then passed to J. P. Karliak, who currently voices the latter in Crash Bandicoot 4: It's About Time (2020). In 2002, he voiced the main villain Raphael Drake in James Bond 007: Nightfire. He also gave his voice for Dr. Sebastian Wolfe in 2011 video game Infamous 2.

In 2009 Ensign was given the Distinguished Alumnus Award for Theatre from the College of Fine Arts at University of Utah in Salt Lake City.

Writing in Forbes in 2011, David M. Ewalt noted,

"Ensign is a classic example of "Hey! It's that guy!" --a versatile character actor with a long and illustrious career, but who you probably can't identify by name, or even where you've seen him"

before going on to list some of Ensign's key film appearances.

== Filmography ==
=== Film ===
Year	Title	Role	Notes
1963	Of Heaven and Home	Homeroom Teacher	Short film
1973	Assassin	Unknown	
1978	Midnight Express	Stanley Daniels	
1978	Superman	Newscaster, Superman's 1st Night	
1980	Raise the Titanic	Lieutenant Northacker	
1981	Buddy Buddy	Assistant manager	
1982	Vice Squad	Chauffeur	
1982	Pink Floyd – The Wall	Hotel Manager	
1982	Jekyll and Hyde... Together Again	Announcer	
1982	Six Weeks	Choreographer	
1982	Kiss Me Goodbye	Billy	
1983	WarGames	Beringer's Aide	
1983	The Star Chamber	Judge Kirkland	
1983	The Man Who Wasn't There	Assistant Secretary	
1983	Mr. Mom	Executive #2	
1984	Ghostbusters	Hotel Manager	
1984	All of Me	Mr. Mifflin	
1984	The Ratings Game	Le Boeuf Maitre d'	
1985	Maxie	Cleopatra Director	
1985	House	Chet Parker	
1988	The Couch Trip	Hendricks	
1988	Inherit the Wind	Reverend Brown	
1988	License To Drive	School Teacher / Bus Driver	
1988	Dr. Hackenstein	Dean Slesinger	
1989	Frederick Forsyth Presents: Just Another Secret	Chuck Lucas	
1991	Life Stinks	Knowles	
1993	Born Yesterday	Phillipe	
1995	Children of the Corn III: Urban Harvest	Father Frank Nolan	
1995	Rough Magic	Powerbroker	
1995	Fatal Pursuit	Pinkrose	
1997	Titanic	Benjamin Guggenheim	
1998	Secrets of a Chambermaid	Hollingswood	
2001	Not Another Teen Movie	Father O'Flannagan	
2002	Confessions of a Dangerous Mind	Simon Oliver	
2002	Solaris	Friend #1	
2003	Bringing Down the House	Daniel Barnes	
2003	Down with Love	J.R.	
2003	Seabiscuit	Steamer Owner	
2004	The Drone Virus	Dr. Jamison	
2006	29 Reasons to Run	Callahan	Gold Bone Award for Best Ensemble Cast (2006)
2008	Prairie Fever	Preacher	Direct-to-video
2010	Love Shack	Tush Bushman	Direct-to-video
2012	The Five-Year Engagement	Grandpa Harold	
2019	Cleanin' Up the Town: Remembering Ghostbusters	Himself	Documentary film

=== Television ===
Year	Title	Role	Notes
1972	Colditz	Lieutenant Dave Olding	Episode: "The Undefeated"
1978	A Life at Stake	Glynn Lunney	Episode: "Houston... We've Got a Problem"
1980	Tenspeed and Brown Shoe	Maitre D'	Episode: "The Sixteen Byte Data Chip and the Brown-eyed Fox"
1981	Enos	Trapnell	Episode: "Forever Blowing Bubbles"
1981	The Greatest American Hero	Principal David Kane	Episode: "The Best Desk Scenario"
1981	M*A*S*H	Major Cass	Episode: "'Twas the Day After Christmas"
1981	The Gangster Chronicles	Owney "The Killer" Madden	13 episodes Television miniseries
1982	Benson	Wally	Episode: "Pete the Hero"
1982	Eleanor, First Lady of the World	Ship Steward	Television film
1982	Games Mother Never Taught You	Jennings Lachman	Television film
1983	Tales of the Golden Monkey	Halliburton	Episode: "Ape Boy"
1983	The Winds of War	Lieutenant Sissons	Television miniseries Episode: "The Changing of the Guard"
1983	Hart to Hart	George Wiesenkopf	Episode: "The Wayward Hart"
1983	Las aventuras de Frank Buck	Inspector Newton	3 episodes
1983	Voyagers!	Dr. Arthur Conan Doyle	Episode: "Jack's Back"
1983	Sunset Limousine	Gavrik	Television film
1984	The Dukes of Hazzard	Bender	Episodes: "Undercover Dukes: Parts 1 & 2"
1984	Three's Company	Doctor	Episode: "Forget Me Not"
1984	The A-Team	Cartel Leader	Episode: "Deadly Maneuvers"
1984	St. Elsewhere	Proctor	Episode: "Cramming"
1984	Velvet	Stefan	Television film
1984	Hotel	Harold	Episode: "Flesh and Blood"
1984	Shattered Vows	Father Meyer	Television film
1984	Too Close for Comfort	Government Agent	Episode: "The Missing Fink"
1984	Hill Street Blues	IRS Investigator	Episode: "Blues for Mr. Green"
1984	Hardcastle and McCormick	Waiter	Episode: "You and the Horse You Rode On"
1984	Cover Up	Donald Rutledge	Episode: "Writer's Block"
1984	A Touch of Scandal	Manderly	Television film
1985	Otherworld	Baxter Dromo	Episode: "Rock and Roll Suicide"
1985	ABC Afterschool Specials	Mr. Grey	Episode: "One Too Many"
1985	Me and Mom	Arthur Dodds	Episode: "The Murder Game"
1985	George Burns Comedy Week	Unknown	2 episodes
1985	Cagney & Lacey	Mort Jeffries	Episode: "Filial Duty"
1986	Dream West	Karl Preuss	2 episodes Television miniseries
1986	Sylvan in Paradise	The Vice Counsel	Television film
1986	Downtown	Kling	Episode: "The Spring Line"
1986–1987	Falcon Crest	Frank McIntyre	4 episodes
1986	Sledge Hammer!	Crandell	Episode: "Dori Day Afternoon"
1987	21 Jump Street	Mr. Mickey Hoskett	Episode: "Next Generation"; Credited as Michael Ensign Evans
1987	Sledge Hammer!	Claude Goldfunger	Episode: "Sledge in Toyland"
1987	Beauty and the Beast	Edward Hughes	Episode: "Nor Iron Bars a Cage"
1987	MacGyver	Derek Thompson	Episode: "Soft Touch"
1988	Wiseguy	Pierre Coscare	Episode: "The Merchant of Death"
1988	Dynasty	William Todd	Episodes: "The Trial" and "The Proposal"
1988	It's Garry Shandling's Show	Store Manager	Episode: "Pete's Got a Secret"
1988	Mr. Belvedere	Professor Rosenthal	Episode: "The Curse"
1989	Single Women Married Men	John Briggs	Television film
1989–1991	Guns of Paradise	Mr. Axlerod	15 episodes
1989	Matlock	Spaulding Kane	Episode: "The Psychic"
1989	MacGyver	Professor Wycliff	Episodes: "Legend of the Holy Rose: Parts 1 & 2"
1990	Mancuso, FBI	Unknown	Episode: "Conspiracy"
1990	Rock Hudson	Mark Miller	Television film
1990	The Golden Girls	Donald	Episode: "All Bets Are Off"
1991	Star Trek: The Next Generation	Minister Krola	Episode: "First Contact"
1991	Matlock	Doctor	Episodes: "The Witness Killings: Parts 1 & 2"
1991	A Different World	Auctioneer	Episode: "How Great Thou Art"
1991	The Wonder Years	Mr. Finora	Episode: "Triangle"
1991	L.A. Law	Dr. George Leeson	Episode: "Lose the Boss"
1991	Secret Bodyguard	Niles	Television film
1992	Jake and the Fatman	Mikael Rikas	Episode: "Ain't Misbehavin'"
1992	Coach	Father Engler	Episode: "Vows"
1992	Raven	Dr. Spencer	Episode: "Disciples of Dawn"
1993	Star Trek: Deep Space Nine	Lojal	Episode: "The Forsaken"
1993	Sisters	Howard Greenway, The Travel Agent	Episode: "The Land of the Lost Children"
1993	Trouble Shooters: Trapped Beneath the Earth	Ronald Marsh	Television film
1993	Dangerous Heart	Father Korcheck	Television film
1994	Melrose Place	Sheriff	Episode: "Love, Mancini Style"
1994	General Hospital	Dr. Gary	3 episodes
1994	A Perry Mason Mystery: The Case of the Lethal Lifestyle	Unknown	Television film
1995	Vanishing Son	Rory Rasmussen	Episode: "Runaway Hearts"
1995	The Monroes	Simon	Episode: "Pilot Episode"
1995	Pointman	Stewart Sumner	Episode: "Business and Pleasure"
1995	Murphy Brown	Jack Stanfield	Episode: "The Ten Percent Solution"
1995	The Christmas Box	Steven Hooper	Television film
1995	Maybe This Time	John Biddle	Episode: "Judgement Day"
1996	The Wayans Bros.	Lloyd	Episode: "It Takes a Thief"
1996	Star Trek: Voyager	Bard	Episode: "False Profits"
1996	Murder One	Mr. Bluth	Episode: "Chapter One, Year Two"
1997	Profiler	Brooks Winchell	Episode: "Doppelganger"
1997	The Nanny	Trevor	Episode: "The Ex-Niles"
1997	Malcolm and Eddie	Miles	Episode: "Whole Lotta Love Seat"
1997	A Thousand Men and a Baby	Bert Schumann	Television film
1997	Caroline in the City	Mr. Fogel	Episode: "Caroline and the Kink"
1998	Beyond Belief: Fact or Fiction	Donald T. Blanchard	Episode: "Ghost Visitor"
1998–1999	Friends	Dr. Ledbetter	Episodes: "The One with Ross' Sandwich" and "The One Where Everybody Finds Out"
1998	Chicago Hope	Dr. Andrew Shaddock	Episode: "Bridge over Troubled Waters"
1998	The Tom Show	Floyd	Episode: "The Top Five"
1998	Two Guys, a Girl, and a Pizza Place	Chairman At Presentation	Episode: "Two Guys, a Girl, and a Presentation"
1999	3rd Rock from the Sun	Fordham	Episode: "Superstitious Dick"
1999	Any Day Now	Unknown	Episode: "Blue"
1999	Brimstone	Dr. Morris	Uncredited; Episode: "Faces"
1999	The X-Files	Dr. Barnes	Episodes: "Biogenesis" and "The Sixth Extinction"
2000	The Others	Professor Dan Teplin	Episode: "Life Is for the Living"
2000	Batman Beyond	Butler	Voice, episode: "The Eggbaby"
2001	Diagnosis Murder	Chick	Episode: "Bachelor Fathers"
2002	Just Shoot Me!	Bob Fennel	Episode: "The Book of Jack"
2002	CSI: Crime Scene Investigation	Judge Peter Croft	Episode: "The Accused Is Entitled"
2002	Son of the Beach	"F"	Episode: "You Only Come Once"
2002	Judging Amy	Dr. Riley	Episode: "Roses and Truth"
2003	CSI: Crime Scene Investigation	Judge Brenner	Episode: "Invisible Evidence"
2003	JAG	General Tillman	Episode: "Posse Comitatus"
2003	Star Trek: Enterprise	Dr. Oratt	Episode: "Stigma"
2004	Monk	Raymond Toliver	Episode: "Mr. Monk Gets Married"
2004–2008	Boston Legal	Judge Paul Resnick	10 episodes
2005	Alias	Vogel	Episode: "Pandora"
2007	Not Another High School Show	Jeeves	Television film
2007	Mystery Woman: In the Shadows	Yuri Slipchenko	Television film
2008	CSI: Crime Scene Investigation	Judge	Episode: "Woulda, Coulda, Shoulda"
2008	Ladies of the House	Pastor Wesley	Television film
2008	Cold Case	Bruce Davies '08	Episode: "Slipping"
2009	Big Love	Ritual Superior	Voice, episode: "Outer Darkness"
2011	Hannah Montana	Mr. Elderman	Episode: "I Am Mamaw, Hear Me Roar!"
2012	Cupid, Inc.	Louis, The Maitre D'	Television film
2014	NCIS	Dr. Ishmael Havana	Episode: "Choke Hold"
2014	Love by the Book	Philip	Television film
2015–2017	Kirby Buckets	Superintendent	Episodes: "Kirby Sells Out" and "Closing Time"
2016	The Detour	Peter Donaire	Episode: "The Tank"
2018	Living Biblically	Karl	Episode: "Love Thy Neighbor"

=== Video games ===
Year	Title	Role	Notes
1998	Crash Bandicoot: Warped	Doctor Nefarious Tropy	
1998	Titanic Explorer	Philip Franklin	
1999	Crash Team Racing	Doctor Nefarious Tropy	
2002	James Bond 007: Nightfire	Raphael Drake	
2003	The Hobbit	Additional Voices	
2003	Crash Nitro Kart	Doctor Nefarious Tropy	
2004	Crash Twinsanity	Doctor Nefarious Tropy / Tribesmen	
2007	The Golden Compass	Master / Head Inspector	
2008	White Knight Chronicles	Dalam	English version
2010	BioShock 2	Additional Voices	
2011	L.A. Noire	Raymond Gordon / Otis Chandler	
2011	Infamous 2	Dr. Sevastian Wolfe	
2015	Lego Dimensions	Hotel Manager	Archival footage; uncredited
