= Crash Team Racing Nitro-Fueled =

2019 video game

- Developer: Beenox
- Publisher: Activision
- Directors: Thomas Wilson; Philippe Turcotte
- Producer: Lou Studdert
- Designer: Mathieu Mercier
- Programmer: Alexandre Gratton
- Artists: Etienne Beaulieu; Jason Godbout
- Composers: Josh Mancell (Note: Mancell was the composer of the original game, while Hakik and Masten were the composers of Crash Nitro Kart; the music was remastered by Tremblay, who also composed new music for the game's new race tracks. Masten is uncredited in the game's credits sequence. Mark Mothersbaugh is listed as a composer in the original game, but was only a music producer.); Ashif Hakik; Todd Masten; Nicolas Tremblay
- Series: Crash Bandicoot
- Engine: Vicarious Visions Alchemy
- Platforms: Nintendo Switch; PlayStation 4; Xbox One
- Release: WW: June 21, 2019
- Genre: Kart racing
- Modes: Single-player, multiplayer

Crash Team Racing Nitro-Fueled is a 2019 kart racing game developed by Beenox and published by Activision for the PlayStation 4, Xbox One, and Nintendo Switch. The game is a remastered version of Crash Team Racing (1999), which was originally developed by Naughty Dog and published by Sony Computer Entertainment for the PlayStation. The game was rebuilt with updated visuals and audio, alongside adjustments to the original gameplay, including kart customization, two variations of the single-player campaign, and an in-game shop. The game includes additional content from Crash Nitro Kart (2003), which was originally developed by Vicarious Visions and published by Universal Interactive.

Crash Team Racing Nitro-Fueled received generally positive reviews from critics, who praised the faithful recreation, vibrant visuals, and robust content, though some noted issues with the difficulty and online functionality, and the post-release addition of microtransactions was criticized. Post-launch, the game was supported by free seasonal content for eight months, with each season introducing new tracks, characters, karts, and customization items. The game sold 10 million copies by June 2025.

== Gameplay ==
A comparison of gameplay as Coco in the Dingo Canyon level in the original game (top) and Nitro-Fueled (bottom)

Crash Team Racing Nitro-Fueled is a remaster of the 1999 racing game Crash Team Racing. At launch, the game featured 34 tracks, with 18 from the original Crash Team Racing, 13 from the 2003 racing game Crash Nitro Kart, and bonus tracks like Retro Stadium. The game included an initial roster of 26 playable characters from Crash Team Racing and Crash Nitro Kart, with additional characters added via free "Grand Prix" season pass events for a total of 56. The game includes kart customization options (such as bodies, paint jobs, skins, wheels, and stickers) that are unlockable via Wumpa Coins, which are earned in-game by winning races and traded at the Pit Stop.

The game features seven modes of play. The flagship single-player mode, Adventure Mode, is a hub-based campaign where the player progresses through a world map by completing races, challenges, and boss fights to defeat the alien Nitros Oxide, who intends to turn Earth into a concrete parking lot and enslave the populace. The mode is available in two variants: Classic, which mimics the original Crash Team Racing experience with a fixed character choice and no difficulty options, and Nitro-Fueled, which allows character-swapping, kart customization, and difficulty selection. Each of the mode's five hub worlds features a series of races the player must win, culminating in a one-on-one race against a boss character, who has unlimited power-ups. Defeating a boss grants access to the next hub world as well as challenges for the previous races. In CTR Challenges, the player collects the letters C, T, and R scattered across tracks while finishing in first. Relic Races are time trials where the player destroys time crates to reduce their time. Crystal Challenges are arena-based challenges where the player collects 20 crystals within a time limit.

The Arcade Mode includes single races, cups, and time trials, supporting local multiplayer (up to four players in split-screen). The Battle Mode features arena-based modes such as "Capture the Flag" and "Last Kart Driving". Online Multiplayer allows players to race or battle against others worldwide, with matchmaking for races and battle arenas. Online races support up to eight players across all tracks, with higher Wumpa Coin rewards than offline races. Online battle modes mirror local Battle Mode, with the same arenas and match types.

== Development ==
After the release of Crash Bandicoot N. Sane Trilogy, a collection of remasters of the first three Crash Bandicoot titles, video game industry journalists speculated that Crash Team Racing would be remastered. In an interview, Vicarious Visions producer Kara Massie did not rule out the possibility of a remaster of Crash Team Racing for the PlayStation 4, acknowledging that she was repeatedly asked about the matter by fans.

Crash Team Racing Nitro-Fueled was developed by Beenox under the direction of Thomas Wilson and Philippe Turcotte, and was produced by Activision's Lou Studdert. Mathieu Mercier served as the lead game designer, while Etienne Beaulieu and Jason Godbout were the game's art directors, and Alexandre Gratton was the lead programmer. Nicolas Tremblay arranged the game's soundtrack and composed the music for the new tracks, with Josh Mancell and Mark Mothersbaugh, the original game's respective composer and music producer, acting as music consultants.

The remaster was built from the ground up, featuring updated visuals and audio while preserving the original game's content, including all characters, tracks, arenas, and modes such as Adventure, Arcade Single and Cup Race, Time Trials, and Battle. The game's visual style drew from Vicarious Visions' Crash Bandicoot N. Sane Trilogy. Beenox emphasized authenticity to the original experience, remastering the soundtrack and refining controls to appeal to both veteran players and newcomers. Additional content included the ability to play as the villain Nitros Oxide, who is unlockable through Adventure Mode challenges, and new customization options for characters and karts. Nitro-Fueled incorporates remastered content from Crash Nitro Kart, including its 13 tracks, karts, battle arenas, and modes, which were adapted to align with the original Crash Team Racing experience. The anti-gravity segments from Crash Nitro Kart were excluded due to the significant development effort required and to avoid comparisons with Mario Kart.

== Marketing, release, and updates ==
The game was first teased on December 4, 2018, when IGN received promotional materials, including orange fuzzy dice and a note hinting at a reveal at The Game Awards on December 6, 2018. The dice, with one die showing only a six and the other showing a standard one-to-six numbering scheme, suggested a release date of June 21, 2019. At The Game Awards, Activision officially announced Crash Team Racing Nitro-Fueled, confirming its release for PlayStation 4, Xbox One, and Nintendo Switch on the hinted date. Those who pre-ordered the PlayStation 4 version would receive exclusive retro-themed content, including skins for Crash, Coco, and Cortex, retro karts, and a retro track, along with a PlayStation-themed sticker pack. Pre-order bonuses across platforms included the Electron Skins Pack for Crash, Coco, and Cortex, with additional retailer-specific incentives such as avatars, themes, and kart sticker packs. A digital deluxe Nitros Oxide Edition offered immediate access to Nitros Oxide, his Hovercraft kart, and exclusive skins, alongside content unlockable in the standard edition through gameplay. Following the game's launch, players reported issues with its online functionality, including disconnections and synchronization problems in multiplayer races. Beenox acknowledged these issues and promised an "immediate fix".

Post-launch, Beenox introduced free seasonal content through Grand Prix events, starting July 3, 2019, with the Nitro Tour Grand Prix, featuring the new Twilight Tour track and unlockable characters like Spyro and Tawna. Subsequent Grand Prix events included Back N. Time (held on August 2–25, 2019), introducing the Prehistoric Playground track, Baby Crash, Baby Coco, and the baby Tyrannosaurus from Crash Bandicoot: Warped, as well as the Neon Circus Grand Prix (released on November 9, 2019), with the Koala Carnival track, new characters like Koala Kong, and a Ring Rally mode. The Winter Festival Grand Prix, released on December 12, 2019, added the Gingerbread Joyride track, characters like Hasty (an original character), Rilla Roo (from Crash Bash), and Yaya Panda (from Crash Bandicoot Nitro Kart 2), and holiday-themed cosmetics. Each Grand Prix offered new tracks, characters, karts, and customization items, unlockable via Nitro Points earned in-game.

On August 2, 2019, Beenox introduced microtransactions, allowing players to purchase Wumpa Coins to acquire items from the Pit Stop store, alongside the option to earn coins through gameplay. Promotional partnerships included collaborations with Sour Patch Kids and Trident Vibes, offering codes for kart customization items, and the Call of Duty Endowment, with proceeds from the Firehawk kart supporting veteran job placement. Xfinity customers could also redeem a limited-edition Xfinity Flash Kart in February 2020.

In February 2020, Beenox announced that the eighth Grand Prix, starting in March 2020, would be the final one, concluding eight months of seasonal content. The Beenox Pack, released in March 2020, added characters like Geary, Crunch, and the Iron Checkpoint Crate, alongside Beenox-themed cosmetics and a Wumpa Challenge system with daily, weekly, and monthly challenges. Developer time trials and a leaderboard reset were introduced to maintain competitive engagement. New characters, including Baby Cortex and Baby N. Tropy, and karts like the Neon Hawk were also added. In September 2020, Beenox confirmed no further updates would be made, as the studio shifted focus to projects like Crash Bandicoot 4: It's About Time. The game's modes, including online multiplayer and the Pit Stop, remained active.

The game did not receive a personal computer port, as explained by Wilson in a July 2025 interview. Resource constraints, security concerns regarding cheating, and a console-focused audience led Beenox to prioritize the console releases. On December 4, 2024, Crash Team Racing Nitro-Fueled was added to Xbox Game Pass, reflecting Activision's integration into Microsoft's ecosystem following the October 2023 acquisition.

== Reception ==
Reception

Aggregate scores
Aggregator	Score
Metacritic	(NS) 80/100 (PS4) 83/100 (XONE) 84/100
OpenCritic	89% recommend

Review scores
Publication	Score
Destructoid	8/10
Easy Allies	8.5/10
Electronic Gaming Monthly	7.5/10
Eurogamer	Essential
Game Informer	8/10
GameRevolution	8/10
GameSpot	8/10
GamesRadar+	5/5
Hardcore Gamer	4/5
HobbyConsolas	85%
IGN	8.2/10
Jeuxvideo.com	18/20
MeriStation	8.5/10
Nintendo Life	8/10
Nintendo World Report	7/10
Pocket Gamer	4/5
Push Square	7/10
Shacknews	8/10
The Games Machine (Italy)	8.8/10
Video Games Chronicle	4/5
VG247	4/5

Crash Team Racing Nitro-Fueled received "generally favorable" reviews across all platforms, according to review aggregator website Metacritic. The game was celebrated as a love letter to the original, with Beenox's enhancements making it feel modern while preserving its core. It was widely recommended as one of the best kart racers available, particularly for fans and those seeking a challenging alternative to Mario Kart.

The presentation was praised for its updates to the original. Critics universally lauded the graphical overhaul, noting the vibrant, colorful art direction and detailed environments. Ford James of GamesRadar+ highlighted such background elements as dancing penguins in Polar Pass and the boater in Papu's Pyramid for enriching the tracks. The character models and animations were described as expressive and faithful to the original, with their enhanced modern polish aligning with the quality of the Crash Bandicoot N. Sane Trilogy and Spyro Reignited Trilogy. Oscar Dayus of GameSpot, Epyon of Jeuxvideo.com and Chris Schilling of Video Games Chronicle singled out specific tracks like Coco Park, Papu's Pyramid, and Hot Air Skyway for their aesthetic appeal, though Gabriele Barducci of The Games Machine saw a few, such as Mystery Caves and Tiny Arena, as less distinctive in design and felt they had not aged well. The soundtrack was praised for being faithful yet modernized, with the option to switch to the original PlayStation audio being appreciated for its nostalgic value. A common critique was the 30 frames-per-second cap across all platforms, which Epyon and Nintendo Life's Chris Scullion felt was underwhelming compared to Mario Kart 8 Deluxe's 60 frames-per-second, though the stable frame rate mitigated this issue for most. The Nintendo Switch version's slightly lower visual fidelity, especially in handheld mode, was noted by Scullion, Nintendo World Report's Neal Ronaghan and IGN's Janet Garcia, who were otherwise still impressed by the visuals.

The core racing mechanics remained a highlight. The power-sliding mechanic, requiring timed button presses to chain boosts, was universally praised for its depth and tactile feel, distinguishing it from Mario Kart by rewarding skill over luck. Critics described the game's handling as tight and responsive, though some noted it requires adjustment due to its sensitivity and complexity compared to modern kart racers like Mario Kart 8 Deluxe. The lack of catch-up items (with Garcia noting that the game's equivalent to Mario Kart's blue shell appears relatively less frequently) was said to make races unforgiving, emphasizing skill but potentially frustrating casual players. The track designs were praised for their variety and creativity, with shortcuts and obstacles adding challenge, though some layouts featuring sharp turns and chokepoints were seen as dated or clunky. The AI was frequently criticized for being overly aggressive and rubber-banded, especially in Adventure Mode, making first-place finishes difficult even on Normal difficulty.

Critics commended the wealth of content. The amount of tracks and characters was widely praised for providing substantial content at launch. The Adventure Mode, which some compared to Diddy Kong Racing, was highlighted for its hub-based structure and variety of challenges, though its short length and high difficulty were noted, and the absence of Crash Nitro Kart's Adventure Mode was a disappointment to James, Epyon and Garcia. The customization options were appreciated for adding replayability, with Wumpa Coins earned in-game being a positive feature, though the grind for coins was seen as steep, especially offline. The Battle Mode was seen as functional but underwhelming, with limited variety and lackluster mechanics compared to racing. Other modes like Relic Races and CTR Challenges were praised for their strategic elements. The inclusion of microtransactions, which were added a month after the game's release, was criticized, particularly because early interviews stated no such feature would be present in the game.

The Adventure Mode's hub-based exploration and progression through races, challenges, and boss fights were lauded for their uniqueness in the kart racing genre. The option to play in Classic or Nitro-Fueled modes was appreciated for catering to both purists and modern players. The boss races were criticized for the boss characters' infinite power-ups and rubber-banding, making them feel unfair. Garcia and Eurogamer's Chris Tapsell noted the mode's short length, estimating 3–5 hours to clear the main races, though they credited the additional challenges for extending replayability.

The local multiplayer was universally praised for its chaotic fun and flexibility across modes. The online multiplayer was deemed functional but plagued by issues like lag, teleporting opponents, and lack of proper matchmaking or ranking systems, leading to unbalanced matches. Patches improved online stability post-launch, as reported by Dayus, James, and MeriStation's Paula Croft. Michael Leri of GameRevolution was disappointed by the lack of split-screen online play. The promise of free Grand Prix events with new tracks, characters, and challenges was seen as a positive for extending the game's lifespan.

Many critics argued the game surpasses Mario Kart in challenge and depth due to its power-sliding mechanics and lack of catch-up items, with James positioning it as a "big brother" to Mario Kart. However, Mario Kart was seen as more accessible and forgiving, making Crash Team Racing less suitable for casual or younger players. Some felt Crash Team Racing did not quite match Mario Kart 8 Deluxe's polish, particularly in online play and frame rate.

=== Sales and awards ===
Following E3 2019, Crash Team Racing Nitro-Fueled was the tenth most pre-ordered title at GameStop. In its debut week, the game was the highest selling title in the United Kingdom. The sales monitor Chart-Track reported that it had the second biggest launch total in the franchise behind the Crash Bandicoot N. Sane Trilogy, as well as third biggest debut of 2019, behind Days Gone and the Resident Evil 2 remake. In its second week of release, it was the highest selling game in Europe, the Middle East and Africa. In the United States, it was the second best-selling game of June 2019 behind Super Mario Maker 2, and had the highest launch month total in the franchise's history. The game returned to the top of the UK chart for the weeks ending July 20 and August 10. As of June 2025, the game has sold over 10 million copies.

The game won the award for "Best Racing Game" at the 2019 Game Critics Awards, and for "Best Sports/Racing Game" at The Game Awards 2019. IGN named Nitro-Fueled the best racing game of 2019. The game was also nominated for "Racing Game of the Year" at the 23rd Annual D.I.C.E. Awards, and for "Game, Classic Revival" at the NAVGTR Awards.
