= Pizzuto =

Pizzuto is a surname. Notable people with the surname include:

- David Anthony Pizzuto (1951–2012), Canadian-born American voice actor
- Eugenio Pizzuto (born 2002), Mexican professional footballer
- Gerald Pizzuto (born 1956), American serial killer
- William Pizzuto, American Republican Party politician
