= The Moon Upstairs =

American psychedelic rock group

The Moon Upstairs was an American psychedelic rock group based in Echo Park, CA. Principal songwriter, guitarist, and pianist, Sharif Dumani formed the group after he and bassist Aaron Ebensperger toured and collaborated with Cody ChesnuTT. Along with Mark Sogomian (guitar) and Josh Mancell (drums) (later adding New York City transplant, Dave Baine), the then four-piece recorded eleven songs, strings arranged by Lavender Diamond's Steve Gregoropoulis. The Moon Upstairs sat on these recordings while members did outside recording work and Dumani toured with The Tyde (Rough Trade Records), filling in for Ben Knight on their 2006 tour with The Black Angels.

In 2007, independent label Gifted Children Records signed The Moon Upstairs and released their debut album, Guarding The Golden Apple in June 2007 in the United States. To promote their release, they toured alongside electronic pioneer, Silver Apples.

Each member of The Moon Upstairs was a multi-instrumentalist.

Members have collaborated and/or toured with: Nick Castro and the Young Elders, The Morlocks, The Tyde, Jonathan Wilson, and Good Time Women.

Their band name is taken from a song by Mott the Hoople.

The band separated January 7, 2010.

== Members ==
- Sharif Dumani - vocals, electric/acoustic guitar, piano, electric piano, organ, lap steel, celeste, melodica
- Aaron Ebensperger - bass guitar, bowed bass, gutted piano
- Mark Sogomian - electric guitar, noise
- Josh Mancell - drums, timpani, gutted piano, vibraphone, percussion
- Dave Baine - guitar, piano, organ

== Discography ==
- Guarding The Golden Apple (2007, Gifted Children Records)
