= Crash Bandicoot 4: It's About Time =

2020 video game

- Developer: Toys for Bob (Note: Additional work by Beenox and Activision Shanghai)
- Publisher: Activision
- Director: Dan Neil
- Producers: Matt Copeland; Maria Rosseau; Louis Studdert; Scot Tumlin
- Designer: Toby Schadt
- Programmer: Brent Gumns-Hostrawser
- Artists: Amber Long; Josh Nadelberg
- Writer: Mandy Benanav
- Composer: Walter Mair
- Series: Crash Bandicoot
- Engine: Unreal Engine 4
- Platforms: PlayStation 4; Xbox One; Nintendo Switch; PlayStation 5; Xbox Series X/S; Windows
- Release: PlayStation 4, Xbox One; October 2, 2020; Switch, PS5, XSXS; March 12, 2021; Windows; March 26, 2021
- Genre: Platform
- Modes: Single-player, multiplayer

Crash Bandicoot 4: It's About Time is a 2020 platform game developed by Toys for Bob and published by Activision. It was originally released for the PlayStation 4 and Xbox One, with releases for the Nintendo Switch, PlayStation 5, Xbox Series X/S, and Windows following in 2021. The eighth main installment in the Crash Bandicoot series, the game's story follows Crash Bandicoot and his sister Coco as they recover the all-powerful Quantum Masks in a bid to prevent Doctor Neo Cortex and Doctor Nefarious Tropy from taking over the multiverse. They are indirectly aided by their former enemy Dingodile and an adventuring alternate-dimension counterpart of Crash's old girlfriend Tawna.

The game retains the series' core platforming gameplay, and adds new elements through the use of the Quantum Masks, who can alter levels and provide means to traverse or overcome obstacles. It also includes additional game modes for replaying levels, and the ability to control five characters, three of whom – Cortex, Dingodile, and Tawna – have their own unique gameplay and levels. The development team intended for the game to be a continuation from the original trilogy in both narrative and gameplay, and created the Quantum Masks and additional playable characters after studying the series' mechanics and determining fresh elements to add to the gameplay.

The game was met with a positive critical reception, with praise going to the preservation and refinement of the series' classic formula as well as the implementation of the new gameplay mechanics. The controls, amount of content and replay value, visuals, music, voice-acting, and story were also commended. The physics, level design, and difficulty drew mixed reactions, and the rail-grinding sections were criticized. Commercially, the game had the highest first-month earnings for a Crash Bandicoot title, topped sales charts in some territories, and was nominated for four awards.

== Gameplay ==
Ika-Ika, one of the four Quantum Masks, allows Crash (or his sister Coco) to reverse gravity and walk upon a level's ceiling.

Crash Bandicoot 4: It's About Time is a platform game in which the player primarily controls either the titular character Crash or his sister Coco, who are tasked with saving the multiverse from domination by Doctors Neo Cortex and Nefarious Tropy. The game's levels take place and progress along a linear map that is divided into ten "Dimensions", each with their own theme. From this map, the player can switch between controlling Crash or Coco at any time. The game can be played in two different styles, which can be selected before the start of a new game and can be switched at any time in the options menu. The default play style is "Modern", in which the player will always return to the latest checkpoint when the player character dies. In the other play style, "Retro", the player is given a limited number of lives (represented by a floating head of the character currently in play), of which more can be collected within the levels. If the player's last life is lost, the level will be restarted from the beginning. Neither the game's difficulty nor reward progress is affected by the differing play styles.

The gameplay takes place from a third-person perspective, with some sections involving the player character running toward the camera or moving in a side-scrolling fashion. Crash and Coco's basic maneuvers include jumping and double jumping, a spinning attack, crawling, sliding, and slamming onto the ground. They can also grind on, hang off and hop across rails, as well as run along designated walls. Scattered throughout the levels are a wide variety of crates serving different functions. Crates generally contain Wumpa Fruit, which grant an extra life if 100 are collected in the Retro play style. Other crates contain an Aku Aku mask, which shields the player character from contact with a single enemy or hazard. Collecting three consecutive Aku Aku masks will grant the player character temporary invincibility from all dangers except falling down bottomless pits. While invincible, the player character can automatically kill enemies and break crates within a certain radius. Within each level is a "Bonus" area that is accessed via a platform bearing a yellow question mark. Each Bonus area consists of a short side-scrolling puzzle sequence in which the player must break all the crates within the area. Dying in a Bonus area will not deplete a life in the Retro play style, and results in the player character respawning next to the Bonus platform within the level.

A feature new to the series is the Quantum Masks, four magical masks that are scattered throughout the game and grant Crash and Coco special powers to traverse obstacles during particular segments. Unlike Aku Aku, the Quantum Masks are not found in crates, but rather materialize in areas where their powers can be used, and transform into a suit worn by Crash and Coco. Lani-Loli can phase objects in and out of tangibility; Akano grants the player character a violent "dark matter spin" that enables them to glide across the air and deflect projectiles; Kupuna-Wa can slow the flow of time; and Ika-Ika can reverse gravity. Aside from Crash and Coco, three other characters are controlled during certain levels: Cortex, Dingodile, and a version of Crash's former love interest Tawna from another dimension. Each character features their own unique move sets: Cortex uses a raygun that can transform enemies into solid or bouncy platforms, along with being able to perform a forward dash. Dingodile uses a vacuum gun that can suck up and fire enemies and objects, as well as draw in faraway collectibles. Tawna, while maintaining some moves used by Crash and Coco, can jump off walls and use a grappling hook to hit objects from long distances.

Each level includes a total of twelve Gems, which can be obtained by fulfilling objectives such as collecting a certain amount of Wumpa Fruit, breaking all the level's crates, completing the level without dying more than three times, and finding the Gem in a hidden area. Earning a certain amount of Gems in a level unlocks a cosmetic skin for either Crash or Coco, for each a total of 30 skins can be unlocked. Collecting all of a level's Gems without losing a life earns the player an N. Sanely Perfect Relic, an achievement that is required for the game's full completion. Hidden in the game are four colored Gems that unlock special Bonus areas.

Aside from the main levels, every other Dimension includes a dedicated boss level. Completing any given level will unlock a "Time Trial", in which the player must complete the level as quickly as possible. Time Trials are activated by collecting a stopwatch icon at the beginning of the level. While a Time Trial is active, all checkpoints are removed, thus requiring the player to start the level over if the player character dies. The Time Trials feature "ghost" recordings by the developers that allow for real-time feedback on whether the player's run qualifies for a Sapphire, Gold or Platinum Relic. Clearing the "Trouble Brewing" boss level unlocks an "N.Verted" mode for each level, in which the level's path is inverted, a different visual effect depending on the level's Dimension is applied, and the Wumpa Fruit are rebranded as "Bumpa Berries". Six of a level's twelve Gems are only accessible in the N.Verted mode. Some levels contain "Flashback Tapes", which must be collected without dying; if the player character dies before collecting a Flashback Tape, it will disappear unless the player restarts the level from the beginning. Collecting a Flashback Tape unlocks a "Flashback Level", a side-scrolling level that takes place before and during the first game.

The game features both local cooperative and competitive hotseat multiplayer modes. In Bandicoot Battle, players compete against other players in time trials. It has two distinct modes: Checkpoint Race, in which the player must reach a checkpoint and complete a level as fast as they can, and Crate Combo, which tasks players to smash as many crates as possible while being timed. The cooperative multiplayer mode is called "Pass N. Play", in which players take turns to complete the game's campaign. All multiplayer modes can accommodate up to four players.

== Plot ==
Following their defeat at the hands of Crash, (Note: As depicted in Crash Bandicoot: Warped (1998)) Uka Uka attempts to liberate himself and Doctors Neo Cortex and Nefarious Tropy from their prison in the past. His latest effort rips open a hole in the fabric of space and time, and causes him to pass out. Cortex and N. Tropy swiftly escape, abandoning Uka Uka. They discover that the rift links their universe to the rest of the multiverse, and decide to make use of it to conquer all dimensions. To ensure success, the pair create the Rift Generator, a generator capable of opening other space-time rifts, and recruit aid from Doctors N. Gin and Nitrus Brio to provide an army in anticipation of their enemies' interference. Aku Aku, Uka Uka's twin brother, senses a great power emanating from N. Sanity Island's central peak, and urges Crash to investigate. Crash's exploration leads him to Lani-Loli, whom Aku Aku recognizes as one of the Quantum Masks – four ancient witch doctor masks that have great power over space and time, and who would only appear if something has opened up the multiverse. At Lani-Loli's urging, Crash and his sister Coco follow him through a rift as he explains that they need to find the other three Quantum Masks across the multiverse to seal the rifts.

During their adventure, Crash and Coco meet an alternate version of Tawna, Crash's old girlfriend. Although they are thrilled to see each other, Tawna declines to explain what happened to Crash and Coco in her own dimension, and insists on working alone. At the same time, Crash and Coco's old enemy Dingodile, who recently retired from villainy to run a diner, is sucked into a rift after exacting revenge on a group of rivaling moonshiner bats after they detonate his business, and he traverses through dimensions in his search for home. Crash and Coco find the Quantum Masks Akano and Kupuna-Wa and defeat N. Gin and N. Brio. When they defeat Cortex, N. Tropy abruptly reveals to him that he and his new partner (later revealed to be a female version of himself from Tawna's dimension) plan to use the Rift Generator's power to reset the timeline in all dimensions so that they may rule over all existence as gods. An incensed Cortex agrees to team up with the Bandicoots, and the three rescue the last Quantum Mask Ika-Ika. The trio meet up with Dingodile and Tawna on a space station, but Tawna captures Crash and Coco and leaves them bound as she goes to face the Tropys at the Rift Generator herself. After Dingodile and Cortex free Crash and Coco, they happen upon Tawna struggling against the female Tropy, who tauntingly reveals that she killed Crash and Coco herself in Tawna's dimension. After the Tropys are defeated, the Quantum Masks destroy the Rift Generator, sealing all the space-time disruptions.

However, following a celebratory trip to a futuristic city, Cortex betrays the group and kidnaps Kupuna-Wa. He uses her powers to travel back in time to 1996 – the year of his original bid for world domination – in an attempt to avert Crash's creation. Ultimately, he is unsuccessful in both convincing his past self to abandon the experiment and killing the present Crash, Coco and Aku Aku, who followed him from the future. As the Quantum Masks banish him to a remote corner of the universe, the past Cortex proceeds with the experiment, preparing to brainwash the past Crash with the Cortex Vortex; the present Crash accidentally destroys the Vortex's power source, causing it to malfunction and reject his past self, thereby ensuring his own creation. Dingodile rebuilds and reopens his diner, Cortex relaxes on a beach and enjoys the peace and quiet, and Crash, Coco, Tawna, Aku Aku and the Quantum Masks play video games at their home on N. Sanity Island. Following an epilogue narrated by Crash detailing the fates and whereabouts of the game's characters, Cortex's relaxation is interrupted by the sudden appearance of Uka Uka.

== Development ==
So with all these pieces together, we aligned and held hands to say what Crash 2020 is going to be is a sequel to the original trilogy, and it's going to be positioned primarily for the core Crash audience. Now, this is the first major guardrail statement. It's a big stick in the sand for us, and it really crisped up when we started to call this project Crash 4.

— Toys for Bob CCO and studio head Paul Yan on Toys for Bob's central mission statement for Crash Bandicoot 4: It's About Time

Crash Bandicoot 4: It's About Time was developed by Toys for Bob, who had previously developed the Spyro Reignited Trilogy and ported the Crash Bandicoot N. Sane Trilogy to the Nintendo Switch. Around the time of the Spyro Reignited Trilogy's development, Toys for Bob began conversing with Activision about a potential new Crash Bandicoot title for 2020. Initially, Toys for Bob internally described the project as a reboot, but as they felt that the descriptor was premature, the team sought to determine their ultimate goal for the franchise. They looked upon a slew of games that fell within the spectrum of reboots and sequels to gauge the benefits and risks of each approach. After profiling players of the recent Crash Bandicoot remasters (who were primarily fans of the original trilogy between their mid-20s to early-40s) and studying the critical and commercial performance of past series titles, the team concluded that their project would be a sequel to the original trilogy targeted primarily at its fans. To solidify this statement, the game was titled Crash Bandicoot 4 to firmly establish it as a continuation of the original trilogy in both its narrative and gameplay style, which Kris Holt of Engadget interpreted as a retcon of the previous installments that were less favorably received.

As Toys for Bob set the game's technical foundations via prototyping and concept art, they drew upon their mission statement for influence as to what their game would and would not be. The game's sequel status resulted in the return of major antagonists Neo Cortex and N. Tropy, as well as the continuation of the time travel theme. Their statement additionally ruled out the open world and beat 'em up elements included in the previous sequels, as well as microtransactions and "Uncharted storytelling". Creative director Dan Neil compiled the points derived from these discussions and compressed them into three basic statements concerning the game's tone, gameplay, and setting, which would formulate its core and give development a clear direction.

=== Art direction ===
Toys for Bob decided early in production that they did not want Crash Bandicoot 4: It's About Time to be perceived as a sequel or DLC extension to the Crash Bandicoot N. Sane Trilogy, and thus set out to define a new art style and direction to differentiate the game from the remasters and establish it as a brand new installment. The team's previous experience with the Spyro Reignited Trilogy allowed them to settle on a direction defined by clear shapes, soft gradients, and an off-kilter quality that gave the remaster a whimsical and playful feel; the team then took this core direction and amplified it for Crash Bandicoot 4 to create a more wild and chaotic aesthetic that better reflected the series' irreverent tone. The team's statement for the setting was to create a colorful and dangerous universe unrestricted by the hardware limitations of the original trilogy.

Upon establishing Crash's look and feel, the art team began what art director Josh Nadelberg called "a really loose and liberating process" of sketching various gameplay ideas and scenarios to provide inspiration for the design team. Many of the game's settings and environmental features were created before any story was written or any game design was constructed; Nadelberg rationalized that waiting to understand the story and script before accomplishing any designing was not a sensible direction for a platform game, a genre not traditionally reliant on storytelling. Some of the art team's smaller ideas would evolve into larger scenarios; for example, lead concept artist Ron Kee's sketch of Crash bouncing on drums served as the basis for the heavy metal-themed boss battle against N. Gin. Although Kee acknowledged that this open-ended ideation phase was somewhat difficult due to the various directions taken, the team was able to create an overall aesthetic that Nadelberg described as "super wacky and full of motion and energy everywhere you look". Understanding that Naughty Dog's original ambition for Crash Bandicoot was to create a living cartoon akin to Looney Tunes, Toys for Bob's animators looked upon the source material and based the game's designs, models and rigs on their studies, pushing for Tex Avery-styled deformations and extreme movements.

=== Quantum Masks ===
The development team recognized early on that a new series installment needed to retain the elements that made Crash Bandicoot unique among platform games. To this end, they played the original games and compared them to the N. Sane Trilogy, studied Crash Bandicoot community channels, and engaged with fans within Toys for Bob. The team then dissected the games' mechanics to determine fresh elements to instill in the franchise. Aku Aku, a recurring game mechanic and character who grants Crash temporary invincibility, inspired experimentation with a series of "Quantum Masks" who would bestow additional abilities. After a prototyping period involving 20–30 different ideas that were tested in virtual "white rooms", the team settled on four Quantum Masks based on the concepts of "slow time", "density", "phase shifting", and "gravity flip". The "density" mask, who would become Akano, originally granted the power of extreme density, which would cause the player character to move slowly, allow them to walk through explosions, lessen their jumping ability and cause them to fall through certain surfaces. Following a series of prototype puzzles, the team felt that limiting the player's speed and jumping prowess resulted in a less fun experience, and thus tweaked Akano's ability into a "dark matter spin" that would send the character into perpetual motion.

Conceptual designing for the Quantum Masks began before their mechanics were finalized, with artist Brett Bean drawing influence from various cultures in different time frames. Artist Nicholas Kole designed the four Quantum Masks after they were established. Kupuna-Wa and Ika-Ika were the easiest masks to be designed, with Kupuna-Wa being based around time-based symbols, and Ika-Ika featuring two-halves displaying mountain and ocean motifs; while Ika-Ika's "blustery old gentleman" personality was quickly established, his other personality was originally more nauseous to reflect his side's water imagery. Akano's furrowed brows and frowning mouth were made to invoke arrows pointing to a center, creating a black hole motif. His design was not affected by the change in mechanic from "density" to "dark matter", as Kole felt that his spinning attack resembled a black hole. Lani-Loli's development was the most difficult. During the prototype stage of his gameplay, the solid and transparent objects affected by his ability were colored pink and blue. This influenced Kole to formulate a "dual personality" concept that went as far as the modeling phase. However, the concept was already in use for Ika-Ika, and Lani-Loli's gameplay was altered to revolve around objects of a single color. Kole ultimately created a personality that was "really frantic, nervous, he always feels like he's lost something". From there, he based Lani-Loli's designs on puzzle motifs, which was later simplified to having certain parts of his face (outside of his eyes and mouth) being solid or transparent at any given moment. The Quantum Masks' ability to manipulate time and space was determined as a means of tying together the diverse environments, themes and scenarios created by the art team, and became the basis for the game's narrative.

=== Character and story development ===
The statement set for the game's tone was summarized as "Jackass meets Looney Tunes", which Toys for Bob studio head Paul Yan defined as "barreling into danger [with the] silliness and wackiness of Looney Tunes" while recognizing the latter source as a primordial influence on the series. In order to solidify this tone, the development team set updating Crash's design for the new game as their earliest task, which prompted conversation within the art team attempting to determine Crash's personality. They eventually honed in on what Nadelberg described as "this dude who's always in the wrong place at the wrong time" who "just manages to get himself out of all these crazy situations in a heroic way, but he's not your classic hero". The team's concept artists created various designs for Crash, with Kole being tasked with combining the most suitable elements from each iteration. Kole did not find photographic references to real bandicoots helpful in the design process, as his attempts to incorporate them resulted in a deviation from the character's spirit; Kole likened Crash's general design to an artist's attempt at drawing a bandicoot from memory a couple years after having seen one. Artist Ryan Jones took the liberty of omitting Crash's flesh-colored lips in favor of a simpler two-toned fur treatment, which was incorporated into his final design. Crash's lack of a neck was the most difficult aspect of his design for the development team's modelers to translate; as Kole observed: "He's just shoulders and then a head. It was actually kind of a big technical challenge to pull that off just right." Coco's redesign, meanwhile, required only minor adjustments, aside from updating her laptop to a tablet.

Toys for Bob's study of the series' mechanics further inspired the inclusion of additional playable characters. Creative producer Louis Studdert cited this decision as the most difficult aspect of the game's early development due to the series' sizeable cast of characters. The selection was ultimately determined by who would best fit into the game's core platforming tenants. The team then decided that the characters should fill particular narrative roles, with Cortex and Tawna respectively being positioned as a villain and "guardian angel". Seeking a wild card to contrast both characters, the team reworked Dingodile into a chaotic neutral figure who causes mischief while attempting to get home. The characters' distinct personalities allowed the team to find unique ways to fit them into the game's plot and gameplay, as well as take the opportunity to introduce new platforming mechanics.

Cortex, like Coco, was given only small design adjustments. However, according to Kole, his more "debonair" proportions resulted in his animations turning out "too handsome", which was mitigated with the creation of an expression sheet that aided in the preservation of Cortex's traditionally comedic characterization. The team experienced difficulty in determining the function of Cortex's raygun. Early experiments involved Cortex using the raygun to devolve enemy characters, such as turning a dinosaur into a hatchling. The team recognized that this would have doubled the amount of assets required for each level Cortex was featured in. They then simplified the concept to turning enemy characters into a random object within the game. The random element was discarded in favor of different platforms to accommodate the traditionally deterministic nature of the series; the two types of platforms were pared down from three for further simplification.

Tawna, the damsel in distress of the original Crash Bandicoot, was dramatically redesigned for her appearance in Crash Bandicoot 4: It's About Time, and was originally armed with a boomerang in her development stage.

Tawna's inclusion and redesign was given special attention in consideration of the series' dominance of male characters. Writer Mandy Benanav played a significant role in her characterization, pointing out that the narrative's "alternate dimension" aspect provided an opportunity to showcase a version of Tawna who was the hero of her own universe. The art team experimented with various designs that were intended to exude confidence and strength while still being recognizable and fitting within the series' tone and aesthetic. Tawna was originally armed with a boomerang, which was eventually retooled into a grappling hook when the development of Dingodile's gameplay rendered the boomerang's function of retrieving faraway objects redundant. The grappling hook resulted in an emphasis on mobility-based gameplay, and was influenced by Sekiro: Shadows Die Twice.

Dingodile's design was challenging for the artists due to the need to find a balance between the elements of his unique hybrid anatomy. The development team compared Dingodile's vengeful motive to John Wick, and acknowledged that his lack of connection to the game's main narrative granted a degree of freedom to the level designers. For Dingodile's gameplay, the general notion of a vacuum was an early decision by the developers. Experiments with the vacuum mechanic included using TNT crates to launch Dingodile backward, pulling switches, and operating slingshots, which were all rejected due to their complexity and effect on the game's pacing.

Tropy's role as the catalyst of the game's dimension-hopping narrative granted the artists ample opportunity for exploration. A wide range of variations on Tropy were created, including an infant piloting a mechanical suit. The prospect of adding a female villain to the series led the team to create the female Tropy, whose design was influenced by Victorian horror audiobooks. For N. Brio's boss battle, Kole created a number of alternate forms that Brio would transform himself into, including a "Slinky worm" and a pterosaur. Although the team ultimately only used Brio's trademark "hulking brute" form for simplicity, the team's positive response to the pterosaur design led to its inclusion in the end-of-level cutscene. Recurring antagonist Ripper Roo was intended to appear as a boss at the end of the "Run It Bayou" level, but does not appear in the final game. Although Nitros Oxide, the antagonist of Crash Team Racing, was rejected as a potential playable character due to his association with racing-based gameplay, he appears in the "Bermugula's Orbit" group of levels, in which his spaceship is hijacked by the two Tropys. His inclusion prompted the art team to design several members of his species, who appear as enemy characters.

While acknowledging the universal appeal of physical humor, Toys for Bob sought to ensure that the game spoke specifically to its adult target audience. To this end, they included suggestive innuendos in some of the skin names and level titles (e.g. "Big Horn Energy" and "Booty Calls"), as well as edgier scenarios such as N. Tropy's narcissism culminating in an incestuous relationship with his female self. This direction influenced the self-aware script, in which the series' altered continuity is humorously alluded to in one scene.

=== Gameplay development ===
Toys for Bob's statement concerning the gameplay was "tense, precise execution". While ensuring that Crash's signature maneuvers of jumping, spinning, sliding, and body slamming felt satisfying and familiar, they sought to exceed the difficulty of the original trilogy while integrating a smoother curve. The development team intended Crash Bandicoot 4: It's About Time to be "the biggest Crash game ever", which influenced the scope and length of the levels as well as the amount of extra features. The game, developed with Unreal Engine 4, was built from scratch rather than reusing assets from the Crash Bandicoot N. Sane Trilogy. However, Toys for Bob's developmental input on the N. Sane Trilogy as well as Crash Team Racing Nitro-Fueled allowed the team to analyze the franchise's fundamental elements and emulate the gameplay and camera of the original games. The team used Crash Bandicoot 2: Cortex Strikes Back as its primary frame of reference in finding a balance between new features and preserving the series' core platforming experience.

In the midst of creating certain levels, the design team experienced difficulty in gauging jumps due to the changing perspectives. To preserve the game's challenge level while granting players a resource to land precise jumps, an overt indicator in the form of a yellow ring around Crash's shadow was added. The development team initially planned to incorporate the "warp room" hub format for accessing levels that was previously seen in Crash Bandicoot 2: Cortex Strikes Back and Crash Bandicoot: Warped. However, they found that their goal concerning the game's difficulty melded better with the linear map system seen in the first game. This system also allowed the team to better craft the game's narrative chronologically, as they sought to place more emphasis on storytelling and character relationships than previous installments had. Beenox, the developer of Crash Team Racing Nitro-Fueled, collaborated with Toys for Bob to create the visual effects and musical remixes for the N. Verted levels, while Activision Shanghai assisted in creating the game's multiplayer modes.

=== Audio ===
Among those who auditioned for the position of composer for Crash Bandicoot 4: It's About Time was Grant Kirkhope, who later shared his audition tracks on Twitter. The role was filled by Walter Mair, who was a fan of the franchise and was enthusiastic when he was invited for an audition by Toys for Bob. Mair was granted access to the title from an early stage of development, allowing him to observe the creation of the game's animations, characters and settings. As Toys for Bob sought to create a sculpted and dynamic musical experience, Mair maintained frequent communication with the audio team, seeking to create an inventive and fresh score that stayed true to the series' established tone. To this end, he incorporated the characteristically heavy use of marimbas and playful compositions, as well as some familiar themes such as those of Cortex and N. Gin. Mair's instrumentation for the game's multitude of characters and settings was varied; for example, Dingodile's leitmotif is defined by a double bass and a "clumsily played" tuba, while the prehistoric levels feature primitive instruments such as bone flutes and fur drums. The game's official soundtrack went live on YouTube on November 18, 2020.

The game's voice-acting was recorded in the Los Angeles-based Rocket Sound studio under the direction of Amanda Wyatt. While Lex Lang reprised his role as Doctor Neo Cortex, several established roles were inherited by new actors, including Scott Whyte as Crash, Eden Riegel as Coco, J. P. Karliak as Doctor Nefarious Tropy, and Roger Craig Smith as Doctor Nitrus Brio. Fred Tatasciore and Zeno Robinson jointly play the two-headed Quantum Mask Ika-Ika. The cast also features Richard Steven Horvitz and Greg Eagles. The game is dedicated to Aku Aku's original voice actor Mel Winkler, who died on June 11, 2020.

== Marketing and release ==
On June 11, 2020, the redesigns for Crash and Tawna were leaked via merchandise listings by European distributor Blackfire. The game was teased on June 18, when Activision sent several reporters a jigsaw puzzle depicting Kupuna-Wa, who first appeared in the PlayStation 4 promotional video "It's Time to Play" in November 2019. The puzzles came with a message signed by "Your Favorite Bandicoot" and stating "A little something to help pass the TIME". The following day, a Taiwan Digital Game Rating Committee filed a rating for the game, revealing the title, box art, a short plot synopsis and the game's developer.

On June 22, a trailer showcasing gameplay mechanics and featuring the Fatboy Slim track "The Rockafeller Skank" was revealed, as well as a release date of October 2 for the PlayStation 4 and Xbox One. Although a notice on the Microsoft Store indicated that the game would feature "in-app purchases", Toys for Bob later confirmed that there would be no microtransactions, attributing the notice to the free "Totally Tubular" cosmetic skins that were offered as a bonus for those who preordered digital copies through the Microsoft Store or PlayStation Store. The N. Verted levels and Dingodile's gameplay were revealed on Sony's State of Play livestream on August 6, and the Flashback levels were revealed at the 2020 Gamescom on August 28. On September 8, Tawna's gameplay was revealed, and Activision announced the September 16 release of a demo consisting of the levels "Snow Way Out" and "Dino Dash" as a bonus to those who had preordered a digital copy of the game through the PlayStation Store. A launch trailer featuring the Chemical Brothers song "Go" was released on September 22, over a week before the game's release for the PlayStation 4 and Xbox One on October 2, 2020. Those who preordered a physical copy of the game through GameStop received a minute hourglass timer. The game's official art book, titled The Art of Crash Bandicoot 4: It's About Time, was published on October 26.

On August 10, 2020, a piece of placeholder source code for the game's official website was found to refer to the Nintendo Switch in a section labeled "PlatformLabel", stirring speculation that the game would potentially be released on the platform. On February 9, 2021, Activision and Toys for Bob announced a March 12 release for the PlayStation 5, Xbox Series X and Series S, and Nintendo Switch, as well as a pending Windows release via Battle.net. The PlayStation 5 and Xbox Series X versions run natively at 4K 60 FPS (with the Xbox Series S version featuring upscale to 4K), and feature faster loading times and 3D audio. The Switch version displays at 1080p when docked and 720p in handheld mode, with both modes running at 30 FPS. Those who have purchased the game on the PlayStation 4 or Xbox One can upgrade to the respective next-generation version at no extra cost (except in Japan) and transfer save data. The PlayStation 5 version uses the DualSense's adaptive triggers when using Cortex's and Tawna's weapons. On the day of the game's release for next-gen consoles, a new "Bare Bones" skin for Crash and Coco was added, which can be obtained by completing the second level. The same day, a new trailer setting the Windows release for March 26 was revealed. Due to its Battle.net exclusivity, the Windows version features always online DRM. The day after its release, the Windows version's digital rights management was cracked by Empress, allowing players to bypass the online check-in. On October 7, 2022, Activision and Toys for Bob announced that the PC version of Crash Bandicoot 4: It's About Time would be released via Steam on October 18. The announcement was made via a package delivered to influencers by Activision consisting of a pizza box with an attached receipt announcing the game's release on the service.

== Reception ==
Reception

Aggregate scores
Aggregator	Score
Metacritic	PS4: 85/100; XONE: 83/100; NS: 80/100; PS5: 86/100; XSXS: 86/100; PC: 83/100
OpenCritic	93% recommend

Review scores
Publication	Score
Destructoid	9/10
Easy Allies	8.5/10
Famitsu	33/40
Game Informer	8.5/10
GameRevolution	5/5
GameSpot	8/10
GamesRadar+	4.5/5
Hardcore Gamer	4/5
IGN	8/10
Nintendo Life	8/10
Nintendo World Report	7.5/10
PC Gamer (UK)	79/100
Push Square	8/10
Shacknews	9/10
VG247	3/5
VideoGamer.com	6/10

Crash Bandicoot 4: It's About Time received "generally favorable" reviews on all platforms, according to review aggregator Metacritic. Michael Leri of GameRevolution gave the game a perfect score and proclaimed it to be the best entry in the series. The preservation and refinement of the classic Crash formula was commended, and the controls were deemed responsive. Although Leri considered the physics and collision to be an improvement over those of the N. Sane Trilogy, others found them to be imprecise, particularly on the platforms' edges. The level design was met with a mixed response; some considered it diverse and well-paced, while others deemed it monotonous and "sadistic". The rail-grinding sections were criticized for their camera perspectives (which were said to obscure incoming obstacles) and sluggish controls. Austen Goslin of Polygon admired the boss battles for their creativity, though Chris Carter of Destructoid felt that a few of them were anticlimactic. Jonathon Dornbush of IGN disliked the addition of fire-spewing crates, claiming that they added little complexity to the platforming and merely added waiting time for them to cool down.

The Quantum Masks were generally welcomed for adding variety to the series' established mechanics. However, the physics for the Akano mechanic were criticized as awkward and ill-suited for precise platforming, and Kevin Dunsmore of Hardcore Gamer additionally faulted the Ika-Ika mechanic for a built-in delay between its activation and effect. The increased roster of playable characters was also welcomed for their unique and enjoyable gameplay styles, though aiming with the characters was said to be difficult due to the lack of a targeting reticle. Some were perplexed by the structure of returning to Crash and Coco's perspective halfway through a new character's level to repeat a past level, with Alex Avard of GamesRadar+ feeling that the stages are "over before they've properly begun", and Oscar Taylor-Kent of PC Gamer finding the process of retreading old levels to play as the new characters "exhausting". Mike Epstein of GameSpot added that switching between the new characters and Crash or Coco could affect the player's muscle memory. Critics remarked that the amount of collectibles and extra modes lent a considerable amount of replay value. Dom Peppiatt of VG247 felt that the amount of new characters and mechanics led to some of them, such as the Dingodile levels, feeling half-baked.

The difficulty level was regarded as challenging and often frustrating, with Goslin and Steven Green of Nintendo World Report claiming that the game's approach to challenge was outdated. The game's final level, which involves using a series of Quantum Masks in rapid succession, was given particular notice, with some players having accumulated a death count numbering in the hundreds. Despite this, Goslin considered the level to be the most fun in the game. The inclusion of the Modern playstyle setting, which grants an indefinite amount of lives, was appreciated for slightly mitigating the difficulty.

The visuals were praised for their bright and vibrant colors, varied and detailed environments, expressive character designs and animations, and Saturday-morning cartoon-styled cutscenes. Josh Wise of VideoGamer.com, however, disliked the game's "synthetic" art direction in comparison to the rougher and sparser look of the original games. Tawna's redesign for the game was criticized by fans for its perceived influence by social justice warrior culture. Paul Tamburro of GameRevolution ridiculed detractors by characterizing their grievances as shallow, and regarded the controversy as "depressing". While Dornbush preferred the hub room format of selecting levels from the second and third games, he was charmed by the presentation of the linear overworld maps, comparing them to pop-up storybooks. Epstein commended the increased frame rate and faster loading times of the PlayStation 5 version, observing that the smoother and more clearly articulated animations resulted in faster gameplay and improved reaction times. Green and Chris Scullion of Nintendo Life, while acknowledging the lowered resolution and frame rate on the Switch version, considered the visuals to be impressive regardless.

The soundtrack was positively received for its upbeat and catchy nature and emulation of Josh Mancell's work on the original trilogy. Leri and Dornbush additionally enjoyed the special effects that the Quantum Masks' abilities had on the background music. Michael Damiani of Easy Allies, however, felt that the soundtrack was mediocre and had no stand-out pieces. Critics enjoyed the light-hearted, humorous, and self-aware script, and also commended the voice-acting, with Goslin singling out Horvitz's and Eagles's performances. Dunsmore, while entertained by the plot, characters, writing, and voice-acting, felt that the limited use of cutscenes left an inadequate amount of time to enjoy the performances, and wished for a longer story.

=== Sales ===
In the United States, the game finished as the 11th best-selling game of September; despite being released in October, October 2–4 is considered by the NPD Group to be a part of the last week of September. It rose to tenth place in the October 2020 NPD charts. The game sold 402,000 units digitally in its first month, a lower figure than those of the recent remastered titles; by comparison, the Crash Bandicoot N. Sane Trilogy sold 520,000 digital units within the last day of June 2017, and Crash Team Racing Nitro-Fueled sold 552,000 throughout June 2019. SuperData Research speculated there was lessened demand for the new title, and observed that its particular release period was more crowded than that of its predecessors. However, they noted that the game's first-month earnings were the highest for a contemporary Crash Bandicoot title due to its higher price tag. Activision deemed the game's commercial performance unsatisfactory, influencing its decision to cancel a sequel in early development.

Following the release of the PS5, Xbox Series X and Series S, and Switch versions of the game, the game rose to No. 15 on the NPD monthly sales charts from No. 65 the previous month. On March 30, 2021, NPD Group analyst Mat Piscatella observed that console sales for Crash Bandicoot 4: It's About Time were being sustained by the success of the mobile runner game Crash Bandicoot: On the Run!, as well as the game's launch on the Switch and continued digital promotion.

The game made #1 in the UK physical sales charts, selling 1,000 copies more than Star Wars: Squadrons, but physical sales were 80% less than Crash Bandicoot N. Sane Trilogy. The game made No. 2 in the UK digital charts. In Japan, the PlayStation 4 version sold 10,437 physical copies within its first week of release, making it the fifth best-selling retail game of the week in the country. The Switch version was released in Japan the following year and sold 2,288 copies during its first week, and was the 20th best-selling retail game in the country during that week. The game topped sales charts for the week of September 28 – October 4, 2020 in Australia, New Zealand, Italy, and France, with just three days' worth of sales. In Switzerland, it was the second best-selling game during its first week of release. As of April 2024, the game has sold over 5 million copies across all platforms.

=== Awards and nominations ===
The game was nominated for Best Family Game in The Game Awards 2020, but lost to Animal Crossing: New Horizons. It was also nominated for Outstanding Control Precision, Outstanding Family Game (Franchise), and Outstanding Sound Effects in the 20th NAVGTR Awards, but lost to Spider-Man: Miles Morales, Animal Crossing: New Horizons, and The Last of Us Part II respectively. GameSpot named the game one of the best of 2020 by score, and GameRevolution voted it the tenth best game of 2020.

Accolades for Crash Bandicoot 4: It's About Time
Year	Award Ceremony	Category	Result
2020	The Game Awards 2020	Best Family Game	Nominated
2021	20th NAVGTR Awards	Outstanding Control Precision	Nominated
2021	20th NAVGTR Awards	Outstanding Family Game (Franchise)	Nominated
2021	20th NAVGTR Awards	Outstanding Sound Effects	Nominated
