= David Anthony Pizzuto =

American actor

- Born: July 9, 1951; Fort Erie, Ontario, Canada
- Died: February 10, 2012 (aged 60); Burbank, California, United States
- Occupation: Voice actor
- Years active: 1982–2012

David Anthony Pizzuto (July 9, 1951 – February 10, 2012) was a Canadian-born American voice actor best known for contributing to video games such as Crash Team Racing as Nitros Oxide and Komodo Joe and also Papu Papu from the Crash Bandicoot series, Fallout: New Vegas, Tanno Vik from Star Wars: The Old Republic. He died following a brief illness.

== Filmography ==
=== Television ===
Year	Title	Role	Notes
2007	Family Guy	Willem Dafoe (voice)	Episode: "Stewie Kills Lois and Lois Kills Stewie"
2010	Archer	Lt. Klauss Kraus, Baccarat Dealer (voice)	Episode: "Skytanic"

=== Videogames ===
Year	Title	Role	Notes
1999	Crash Team Racing	Dingodile, Papu Papu, Komodo Joe, Nitros Oxide	
2000	Draconus: Cult of the Wyrm	Cynric, Rakka, Draconus	
2004	The Chronicles of Riddick: Escape from Butcher Bay	Guard	Credited as David Pizzoto
2004	Men of Valor	Frank Sturgess	Credited as David Pizzoto
2005	SWAT 4	U-1, Lt. Sonny Bonds	
2005	Jade Empire	Tiger Shen, Thug, Man	
2005	The Incredible Hulk: Ultimate Destruction	Division Soldier	Credited as David Pizzuto
2005	James Bond 007: From Russia with Love	Octopus Commando, Radio Voice	
2005	50 Cent: Bulletproof	Mobster	Credited as David A. Pizzuto
2006	SWAT 4: The Stetchkov Syndicate	SWAT Commander Sonny Bonds	Credited as David A. Pizzuto
2006	Star Wars: Empire at War: Forces of Corruption	Urai Fenn	
2007	Steel Horizon	English Officer, American Officer	
2007	Blazing Angels 2: Secret Missions of WWII	Commander	
2010	Valkyria Chronicles II	Laurence Kluivert	English Dub
2010	Prison Break: The Conspiracy	Davis	
2010	Mafia II	Det. Gabe, Rocco Mazzeo, Det. Chris	
2010	Fallout: New Vegas	Lilian Marie Bowen	
2011	Rango	Rattlesnake Jake / Jumper #3	
2011	Driver: San Francisco	Jason Tyler	
2011	Spider-Man: Edge of Time	Additional voices	
2011	Call of Duty: Modern Warfare 3	President Boris Vorshevsky	
2011	Star Wars: The Old Republic	Tanno Vik, Sedyn Kyne, Corridan Ordo	
2012	Asura's Wrath	Deus	English Dub; Credited as David Pizzuto; Posthumous release
2012	Guild Wars 2	Additional Voices	Posthumous release
