= Crash Team Racing =

1999 video game

- North American box art
- Developer: Naughty Dog
- Publisher: Sony Computer Entertainment
- Director: Jason Rubin
- Producer: Grady Hunt
- Designers: Evan Wells; Dan Arey
- Programmer: Danny Chan
- Artist: Bob Rafei
- Composer: Josh Mancell
- Series: Crash Bandicoot
- Platform: PlayStation
- Release: NA: October 19, 1999; EU: December 1999
- Genre: Kart racing
- Modes: Single-player, multiplayer

Crash Team Racing (stylized as CTR: Crash Team Racing) is a 1999 kart racing game developed by Naughty Dog and published by Sony Computer Entertainment for the PlayStation. It is the fourth installment in the Crash Bandicoot series and the final Crash Bandicoot game to be developed by Naughty Dog. The game's story focuses on the efforts of Crash Bandicoot, Doctor Neo Cortex, and other ragtag team of characters in the Crash Bandicoot series, who must race against the egomaniacal Nitros Oxide to save the Earth from destruction. In the game, players can take control of one of fifteen Crash Bandicoot series characters, though only eight are available at first. During the races, offensive and speed boosting power-ups can be used to gain an advantage.

Crash Team Racing was met with critical acclaim upon release, being widely regarded as a highly polished and entertaining kart racing game that drew heavy inspiration from Nintendo's Mario Kart and Diddy Kong Racing. Critics praised its execution, technical achievements, and engaging gameplay, often arguing it surpassed its competitors in several areas despite its lack of originality. A successor, Crash Nitro Kart, was released in 2003 for the Game Boy Advance, GameCube, PlayStation 2, Xbox and N-Gage. A remaster of the game developed by Beenox, titled Crash Team Racing Nitro-Fueled, was announced at The Game Awards 2018 and was released on the Nintendo Switch, PlayStation 4 and Xbox One on June 21, 2019, by Activision.

== Gameplay ==
An example of a race in Crash Team Racing

Crash Team Racing is a kart racing game in which the player controls characters from the Crash Bandicoot series, kart racing on varied tracks to finish first. Characters are categorized into three types: large (slow acceleration, high top speed, poor handling), medium (balanced stats), and small (fast acceleration, great handling, low top speed). Players can accelerate, steer, reverse, brake, hop, and use power-ups, with an option for analog throttle control or digital button inputs.

Speed boosts can be obtained with the power slide; the player executes the slide by holding down one of the shoulder buttons to perform a hop, and steering before the kart lands. While sliding, the "Turbo Boost Meter" on the lower-right corner of the screen fills up and goes from green to red. At the same time, the exhaust gas from the player's kart turns black. To get a speed boost, the player quickly presses the opposite shoulder button while the Turbo Boost Meter is red. The player can execute three speed boosts in a row during a power slide, with the third speed boost being more powerful than the previous two. If the player waits too long into the power slide for a boost, the kart back-fires and the chance for a speed boost is lost; power sliding for too long causes a spin-out. Aside from power slides, speed boosts can be obtained by gathering hang time when leaping over gaps in the track. The longer the player is in the air, the bigger the speed boost will be when the kart lands. Hitting the accelerator just before the race begins provides an initial speed boost.

Two distinct forms of crates are scattered throughout the tracks and arenas of Crash Team Racing. Crates with question marks on them hold power-ups, which can be obtained by driving through and breaking apart said crates. When the player collects a power-up, it will appear in a box at the top of the screen. The player can activate the power-up to hinder the other racers or supplement the player's own performance. Fruit Crates carry Wumpa Fruit that increase the speed of the player's kart and strengthen the player's power-ups if ten of them are obtained. Some power-ups can be dropped behind the player or fired forward.

=== Modes ===
Crash Team Racing features 5 racing modes: Adventure, Time Trial, Arcade, Versus and Battle. In each mode, the player selects 1 from 8 characters to control. The Adventure mode is a single-player campaign where the player must race through all of the tracks and arenas in the game and collect as many trophies, Relics, Boss Keys, CTR Tokens and Gems as possible. The Adventure Mode's premise involves the antagonist Nitros Oxide, an ornery and arrogant extraterrestrial who threatens to turn Earth into a concrete parking lot if he defeats the planet's best driver in a race. In the beginning of the game, the player only has access to two tracks. As the player wins more races, more tracks on multiple worlds become available. In each level, the player must win a trophy by coming in first place. When the player receives all four trophies in a world, the "Boss Garage" of that world can be accessed. In the Boss Garage, the player competes in a one-on-one race against a boss character. If the boss character is defeated, the character will relinquish a Boss Key, which the player uses to access new worlds and ultimately to face Oxide inside his spaceship.

After beating levels, new modes become available, such as the Relic Race, in which the player races through the track alone and completes three laps in the fastest time possible. "Time Crates" scattered throughout the level freeze the game timer when a player drives through them. If all of the Time Crates are destroyed, the player's final time is reduced by ten seconds. The player wins a Relic by beating the time indicated on the screen. Another mode, the CTR Challenge, is played like a normal race, except that the player must also collect the letters C, T and R scattered throughout the track. If the player manages to collect all three letters and come in first place, a "CTR Token" is awarded. These tokens come in five different colors: Red, Green, Blue, Yellow and Purple. The Purple CTR tokens are awarded for beating the Crystal Bonus Round by collecting 20 crystals under a certain time limit. If the player collects four tokens of the same color, the player will be able to access the Gem Cup of the corresponding color. Gem Cups are racing tournaments held against computer-controlled opponents and are accessible in a secret area in the "Gemstone Valley" world. A Gem Cup consists of four tracks in a row, in which the player must race for points. If one of these cups is won, a Gem is awarded. To win the game, the player must collect all trophies, Boss Keys, Relics, CTR Tokens and Gems before defeating Nitros Oxide in a one-on-one race.

In Time Trial, the player races against the clock to set personal best times, with ghost data for replays. The Arcade and Versus modes allow single or multiplayer racing (up to four players with a multitap) on individual tracks or cup circuits (four races for cumulative points). The Battle mode is a multiplayer arena mode in which players use weapons to eliminate opponents, with customizable settings such as time limit, kill limit, weapon selection, and teams.

== Development and release ==
Development of Crash Team Racing started as an original intellectual property with block-headed characters. Naughty Dog pitched the title to Sony, to which Sony agreed after Naughty Dog showed willingness in making the title a Crash game. Sony made a deal with copyright owner Universal Interactive to publish the game. The game could have had original characters in case the deal did not come through. Naughty Dog began production on Crash Team Racing after the completion of Crash Bandicoot 2: Cortex Strikes Back; the game engine for Crash Team Racing was created at the same time Crash Bandicoot: Warped was produced. Development took place over the course of eight months on a budget of $2.4 million by a team of 16–18 staff. The characters of the game were designed by Charles Zembillas and Joe Pearson, who designed the characters of the last three installments of the series. Bob Rafei led concept development, art direction, environment modeling and vertex lighting, cinematic animations and layouts. Nitros Oxide was originally a mad scientist obsessed with speed who plotted to speed up the entire world until the end of time. However, having exhausted human, animal, machine, and various combinations for Crash Bandicoot bosses in the past, it was decided to have Nitros Oxide be an otherworldly character. The original "speed up the world" plot is referenced in a promotional comic (written by Glenn Herdling and drawn by Neal Sternecky) featured in the Winter 2000 issue of Disney Adventures.

During the game's prototypical stage, the team built a replica of the "Crescent Island" course from Diddy Kong Racing to test whether a racetrack of the same scope and scale was possible on the PlayStation. To address the complication of potentially having up to 64 kart tires on a four-player split-screen, programmer Greg Omi developed a method of rendering the tires as camera-based two-dimensional sprites. The turbo system that gives the player boosts of speed during power slides and by gathering hang time was added to make Crash Team Racing feel more interactive and involving than older kart-racing games. The central antagonist character Oxide was never intended to be playable in the game due to the PlayStation console's memory limitations. Said limitations further affected the game's roster of playable characters; Polar and Pura were originally to ride in the same kart and be played as a single character, but were ultimately split into separate characters, and both Komodo Brothers were to appear in the game before Komodo Moe was omitted.

David Baggett produced the game's soundtrack, with Josh Mancell of Mutato Muzika composing the music. Sound effects were created by Mike Gollum (who also provided some voice-acting), Ron Horwitz and Kevin Spears of Universal Sound Studios. The voice of Crash was provided by Chip Chinery, while Clancy Brown voiced Doctor Neo Cortex and Uka Uka, and Brendan O'Brien voiced Doctor N. Gin, Tiny Tiger and Pinstripe Potoroo. Additional voices were provided by David A. Pizzuto, Mel Winkler, Michael Ensign, Hynden Walch, Billy Pope and Michael Connor.

Crash Team Racing went into the alpha stage of development in August 1999, and the beta stage on September. It was released on October 19, 1999, in North America, and in December 1999 in Europe. NASCAR vehicle No. 98 was given a custom Crash Bandicoot-themed paint job in promotion of the game. A playable demonstration was included on a promotional compilation disc released by Pizza Hut on November 14, 1999.

== Reception ==
Reception

Aggregate score
Aggregator	Score
Metacritic	88/100

Review scores
Publication	Score
AllGame	4/5
Consoles +	93%
Electronic Gaming Monthly	10/10, 8.5/10, 9.5/10, 9.5/10
EP Daily	9.5/10
Famitsu	8/10, 8/10, 9/10, 8/10
Game Informer	9/10
GamePro	5/5
GameRevolution	B+
GameSpot	8.4/10
Hyper	90%
IGN	8.5/10
Next Generation	5/5
Official U.S. PlayStation Magazine	5/5
PlayStation: The Official Magazine	4.5/5

Crash Team Racing received "generally favorable" reviews, according to review aggregator Metacritic. It was frequently deemed the best kart racer on the PlayStation and, in some cases, superior to Mario Kart and Diddy Kong Racing due to its technical prowess and refined gameplay. Shawn Smith and Chris Johnston of Electronic Gaming Monthly (EGM) and Victor Lucas of The Electric Playground explicitly stated Crash Team Racing outshone Mario Kart, citing better controls, graphics, and track design. Doug Perry of IGN compared it favorably to both Mario Kart 64 and Diddy Kong Racing, noting its lack of slowdown and enhanced features. Dean Hager of EGM called it the best mascot kart racer on the PlayStation, while Jeff Gerstmann of GameSpot argued it succeeded where other clones (e.g., Mega Man, Chocobo Racing) failed.

The controls were deemed tight, responsive, and intuitive, and the game was said to be accessible to newcomers yet rewarding of skill mastery through power sliding, jump boosts, and strategic weapon use. Lucas, Rybicki, and GamePro's The D-Pad Destroyer highlighted the precise controls and strategic depth, such as turbo boosts from power slides and jumps. Perry and Smith emphasized the game's complex turbo system and realistic physics (e.g., icy patches), which added depth to the kart racing formula. Johnny Liu of GameRevolution described the controls as natural, though a minor critique from Rybicki noted a less-than-ideal turning radius in reverse. Joe Ottoson of Allgame cited the inability to reconfigure the controls as the sole drawback to the game's presentation.

The visuals were praised as impressive for a PlayStation title, with smooth, clean graphics, vibrant environments, and minimal technical issues like slowdown, draw-in, or texture warping. The D-Pad Destroyer and Rybicki praised the cartoony aesthetic, effective use of textures, and absence of graphical flaws, even in four-player mode. Perry noted the fully polygonal characters and environments, comparing the game favorably to Mario Kart 64 and Diddy Kong Racing for its lack of slowdown. Gerstmann and Ottoson commended the large, well-designed environments that maintained a cartoon-like charm without compromising performance.

The tracks were described as ingeniously designed, diverse, and challenging, with shortcuts, obstacles, and varied themes enhancing replayability. Lucas highlighted standout tracks like Sewer Speedway and Cortex Castle for their creative design and replay value. Perry praised courses like Tiny Arena and Polar Pass for their obstacles and strategic elements. Gerstmann and EGM's Crispin Boyer noted the tracks' superb design and surprises, requiring players to learn layouts to succeed.

The robust game modes, particularly Adventure and Battle, were said to provide substantial content and replay value, making Crash Team Racing a standout in the genre. The Adventure mode, likened to Diddy Kong Racing, was lauded by Lucas, Gerstmann, and Smith for its hub-based structure, boss battles, and collectibles. Rybicki and Hager emphasized the engaging single-player experience and the multiplayer modes' excellence, with four-player support via a multitap. Rybicki highlighted the Battle mode for its customizable options like time limits and weapon selection. Liu appreciated the variety of modes, though he found the Adventure mode's ending underwhelming.

The sound design was considered solid and fitting of the cartoon aesthetic, with enjoyable music and varied character voice lines, though some reviewers found the music repetitive or unmemorable. The D-Pad Destroyer praised the whimsical background music and fitting sound effects, while Lucas highlighted the high-quality voice acting and cartoonish sound effects. Perry and Liu, however, found the music simplistic or kitschy, with Perry suggesting lowering the music volume. Liu noted some character voices, like Crash's, felt off or effeminate.

Critics acknowledged the game's lack of originality, being heavily derivative of Mario Kart and Diddy Kong Racing, but praised its superior execution. Perry and Gerstmann explicitly called Crash Team Racing a "Mario Kart clone", with Perry noting near-identical elements like course structure and power-ups. Lucas and Smith drew parallels to Nintendo's titles but argued Crash Team Racing surpassed them in polish and technical execution. Rybicki and Boyer asserted that Crash Team Racing's quality made its derivative nature irrelevant, as it refined the kart racing formula.

The multiplayer modes, especially four-player racing and Battle Mode, were a major strength, offering high replayability and fun for groups. Critics emphasized the seamless four-player experience, with no performance drops. Rybicki highlighted the Battle Mode's customization options. Perry and Ottoson stressed its party game appeal, making it ideal for group play.

Crash Team Racing was nominated for Console Racing Game of the Year at the 3rd Annual Interactive Achievement Awards.

=== Sales ===
In the first full month of its release, Crash Team Racing was the third highest selling PlayStation game and tenth best-selling home and handheld console game in the United States. It remained on the best selling home and handheld console game list the following month. Overall, the game sold 1.9 million units in the United States and over 300,000 units in Japan. As a result of its success, the game was re-released for the Sony Greatest Hits line-up in 2000 and for the Platinum Range on January 12, 2001.

== Legacy ==
The success of Crash Team Racing, combined with that of Mario Kart, inspired a kart racing game boom in the early 2000s; Jason Rubin noted that Naughty Dog was pitched wrestling-themed kart games twice by different publishers. A follow-up titled Crash Nitro Kart was released in 2003 for the PlayStation 2, Xbox, GameCube, Game Boy Advance and N-Gage and was the first game in the Crash Bandicoot series to feature full motion video.
