= Crash Nitro Kart =

2003 video game

- North American PlayStation 2 cover art
- Developer: Vicarious Visions
- Publisher: Universal Interactive
- Producer: David Robinson
- Designer: Dan Tanguay
- Programmer: Sam Calis
- Artists: Charles Zembillas; Joe Pearson; Perry Zombolis Jr.
- Writer: Dan Tanguay
- Composers: Ashif Hakik; Todd Masten
- Series: Crash Bandicoot
- Engine: Intrinsic Alchemy
- Platforms: PlayStation 2, Xbox, GameCube
- Release: NA: November 11, 2003; EU: November 28, 2003; AU: December 3, 2003
- Genre: Kart racing
- Modes: Single-player, multiplayer

Crash Nitro Kart is a 2003 kart racing game developed by Vicarious Visions and published by Universal Interactive for the PlayStation 2, Xbox, and GameCube. It is the second racing game in the Crash Bandicoot series after Crash Team Racing and the first game in the series to feature full motion videos. The game's plot centers on the abduction of Crash Bandicoot, along with other characters in the series, by the ruthless dictator Emperor Velo XXVII, who threatens to destroy the Earth if they refuse to race in his gigantic coliseum for the entertainment of his subjects.

Crash Nitro Kart was met with a mixed critical reception, with many reviewers deeming it inferior to its predecessor, though the game's presentation received praise. Content from the console version was later remastered by Beenox as part of Crash Team Racing Nitro-Fueled, released for the Nintendo Switch, PlayStation 4 and Xbox One on June 21, 2019 by Activision.

== Gameplay ==
An example of a race in Crash Nitro Kart

Crash Nitro Kart is a racing game in which the player controls characters from the Crash Bandicoot series, most of whom race in karts. While racing, the player can accelerate, steer, reverse, brake, hop or use weapons and power-ups with the game controller's analog stick and buttons. Four distinct types of crates are scattered throughout the tracks and arenas of Crash Nitro Kart. "Item Crates" are marked with a question mark (?) and usually come in sets of four. The player can obtain a weapon or power-up by driving through an Item Crate and breaking it apart. The player can only carry one weapon or power-up at a time. "Multiplier Crates" are marked with an "X" and are usually found in hard-to-reach spots on the tracks. These special crates contain three of a certain weapon or power-up. "Wumpa Crates" are unmarked and carry "Wumpa Fruit" that strengthens the player's weapons and power-ups if ten of them are obtained. "Activation Crates" are marked with an exclamation point (!) and activate either a boost pad or a trap that can slow down the other racers.

Boosting is an important part of Crash Nitro Kart's gameplay. When the player boosts, their kart will momentarily go slightly faster than its normal top speed. Boosts are achieved by driving over boost pads scattered across the tracks, pumping the gas at the starting line, and holding the gas button at the right time when being reset on the track. Another technique used for boosting is the "power slide". To execute a power slide, the player holds down one of the hop buttons while steering. While sliding, a curved "boost gauge" appears next to the player's kart. When the gauge goes from green to red, the player presses the opposite shoulder button to obtain a boost. The higher the boost gauge goes, the more powerful the boost will be.

=== Racing modes ===
Crash Nitro Kart features 6 racing modes: Adventure, Race Time Trial, Lap Time Trial, Quick Race, Team Race and Cup Tournament. Some modes are free-for-all, while others can be played as a team. The "Adventure Mode" is a single-player game in which the player must race through all of the tracks and arenas in the game and collect as many Trophies, Relics, Boss Keys, CNK Tokens and Gems as possible. The objective of the Adventure Mode is to win all the races of the five different worlds and win the freedom of the playable characters from the tyrannical Emperor Velo XXVII. The hub world of the game is Velo's Coliseum, from which the player can access any of the five other worlds through special gates. Most of these gates are initially locked; the player must complete the races of one world to gain access to the next world. When inside a world, the player may access a race by driving the selected character onto a "Warp Pad". By winning a race, the player will receive a Trophy. When the player receives all three Trophies in a world, the player will be able to race against that world's champion, who acts as a boss character. If the player manages to defeat the world's champion, the champion will relinquish a World Key. This allows the player to engage in the special modes of that world and enables access to the next world.

The special modes of each race consist of the "Relic Race", the "CNK Challenge", the "Crystal Arena" and the "Gem Cups". In the Relic Race, the player must race through a track alone and complete three laps in the fastest time possible. To aid the player, "Time Crates" are spread throughout the track. When the player drives the character through a Time Crate, the clock freezes for whatever number of seconds are indicated on the Crate. If all of the Time Crates on a track are destroyed, the player's final time will be reduced by ten seconds. The player wins a Relic by beating the time indicated on the screen. The CNK Challenge is played like a normal race, except that the player must also collect the letters C, N and K scattered throughout the track. If the player manages to collect all three letters and come in first place, a "CNK Token" is awarded. These tokens come in four different colors. If the player collects four tokens of the same color, the player will be able to access the Gem Cup of the corresponding color. Gem Cups are racing tournaments held against computer-controlled opponents, and are accessible through a special gate at Velo's Coliseum. If one of these cups is won, a Gem is awarded. When the player collects all the Trophies, World Keys and Relics, the player will be able to race against Emperor Velo on his personal racing track. If the player manages to defeat Velo in this race, the game is won.

The "Race Time Trial" is a single-player mode where the player attempts to set the best time on any of the tracks in the game. There are no other racers to hinder the player, but no item-bearing crates are present to aid the player. When the three-lap race is finished, the player can save a "ghost", a replay of that race. The next time that track is accessed in this mode, the player can load the ghost, allowing the player or others to compete with the ghost in a race. If the player finishes each of the tracks in a set time, the player will be able to compete against the ghosts of the game's boss characters. The "Lap Time Trial" plays like the Race Time Trial except that the player races to get the best time for a single lap around the track. When one lap is finished, the player's "ghost" (a replay of the lap that was just completed) will appear. Whenever a better time on the lap is accomplished, the old ghost will be replaced by the faster one. In the "Quick Race", the player selects a character, a track and races. The player can adjust the computer's skill level and the number of laps.

In the "Team Race", the player joins forces with a computer-controlled partner to win a race. When the player and the partner are in close proximity of each other, the "Team Meter" will rise. When the Team Meter is full, the player may activate the "Team Frenzy", in which the player and partner have temporary access to unlimited weapons and power-ups. In the "Cup Tournament", the player competes against other racers on three different tracks. At the end of a track, the racer in first place gets nine points, the second place racer is awarded six points, third place gets three points and fourth place gets one point; the rest get no points. When all three tracks are completed, the racer with the most points wins. This is the only racing mode that can be played by more than one human player.

=== Battle modes ===
In the battle modes, instead of racing on tracks, the player speeds around battle arenas while collecting weapons and attacking opponents. There are five battle modes in Crash Nitro Kart. Each mode can be played by two to four players. In the "Limit Battle", the objective is to attack opponents with weapons and traps while avoiding attacks unleashed by the opponents. Offensive and defensive weapons can be collected by smashing special crates. A point and time limit can be set by the player before the game begins. Whoever earns enough points or has enough points when time runs out wins. This mode can be played free-for-all or with teams. In "Last Kart Driving", the contestants compete until they run out of lives. A contestant loses a life every time they are hit by a weapon or hazard or fall into a pit. A contestant who runs out of lives will be eliminated. As the title suggests, the last kart driving wins. This mode can be played free-for-all or with teams.

In "Crystal Grab", the contestants must fight to collect all the Crystals in the arena. When a contestant is attacked, they will drop any Crystals they've gathered, allowing opponents to steal them. This mode can be played free-for-all or with teams. In "Capture the Flag", two teams attempt to capture each other's flag and bring it back to their respective flags. Players must race to their opponents' side of the map and drive over their flag to grab it. They must then drive over their own flag's base to score a point from the flag they've captured. A flag that has been stolen can be dropped if the thief is hit with any weapon. Stolen flags that have been dropped can be returned to their respective bases. Due to the weight of the flags, any kart with a flag will be slowed down. The game ends when time runs out or when one of the teams has gotten enough points. This mode can only be played in teams. "Steal the Bacon" is a variation of "Capture the Flag" in which two teams fight over one flag that is situated in the middle of the arena. The teams must attempt to take the flag and bring it to their respective base.

== Plot ==
=== Characters ===
Crash Nitro Kart is the first game in the Crash Bandicoot series to feature full-motion video cinematics. In this cutscene, the main antagonist of the game, Emperor Velo XXVII, talks down on, from left to right, Doctor Neo Cortex, Doctor N. Gin, Tiny Tiger, Crunch Bandicoot, Coco Bandicoot and Crash Bandicoot.

Crash Nitro Kart features around twenty-seven characters, sixteen of which are playable. The sixteen characters are split into four teams of four with each team driving karts of a matching color.

"Team Bandicoot", which pilots blue karts, is led by Crash Bandicoot, the titular protagonist of the series. His kart is an all-round performer with exceptional acceleration. Coco Bandicoot, Crash's younger genius sister, programmed her kart's wheels to balance their speed better, improving her kart's turning ability. Crunch Bandicoot, Crash's friend, originally created by Doctor Neo Cortex to destroy Crash, pilots a kart with amazing momentum and speed but slow acceleration. Fake Crash, an imperfect duplicate of Crash, becomes accessible as a playable character if the player performs 50 consecutive speed boosts on any track in Adventure Mode as a member of Team Cortex.

"Team Cortex", which pilots red karts, is led by Doctor Neo Cortex, Crash's archenemy and main antagonist of the series. Like Crash, Cortex pilots a kart that excels in acceleration. Doctor N. Gin, Doctor Cortex's right-hand man, is a mechanical genius who pilots a kart that specializes in turning ability. Tiny Tiger, Doctor Cortex's most faithful henchman, is a hulking giant who pilots a kart with a high top speed like Crunch. Doctor Nefarious Tropy, the self-proclaimed master of time, becomes accessible as a playable character if the player beats all the time records in Race Time Trial Mode.

"Team Oxide", which pilots yellow karts, is led by Crash Team Racing's main antagonist Nitrous Oxide. His henchmen, Zam and Zem, become accessible as playable characters if the player wins the Purple and Green Gem in Adventure Mode respectively. "Real Velo", the form Emperor Velo is seen at the end of Adventure Mode, is a part of the Yellow Team and becomes accessible as a playable character if the player wins the Adventure Mode twice: once as a member of Team Bandicoot and once as a member of Team Cortex.

"Team Trance", which pilots green karts, is led by N. Trance, the egg-like master of hypnotism. Dingodile and Polar, whom N. Trance has hypnotized, becomes accessible as playable characters if the player wins the Red and Blue Gem in Adventure Mode respectively. Pura, whom Trance has also hypnotized, becomes accessible as a playable character if the player performs 50 consecutive speed boosts on any track in Adventure Mode as a member of Team Bandicoot.

The main antagonist of the story, Emperor Velo XXVII, is the confident, dominating, bullying and contemptuous ruler of his own galaxy; he threatens to destroy Earth if Crash and Cortex's teams refuse to compete in his Galaxy Circuit. Velo is the final boss character of the game and races alongside two advisors who lay down offensive measures to slow the player down. Preceding Velo are four boss characters who possess "World Keys" that are needed to race against Velo. In order, the bosses consist of the following: Krunk, a hulking creature who feels that Earth is a copy of his home planet, Terra, and races to prove which planet is superior; Nash, a genetically engineered shark-like creature who was created to always move; Norm, a goblin-like mime who races alongside a larger and more obnoxious version of himself; and Geary, a robot as much obsessed with perfection as he is with cleaning.

Aku Aku and Uka Uka serve as helpers throughout the game, giving tips and hints regarding driving skills, info on objects in the hub world, tips on how to use weapons effectively, and occasional warnings during races.

=== Plot ===
Crash, Coco and Crunch Bandicoot are relaxing at their home in the Wumpa Islands while their nemesis, Doctor Neo Cortex, is in his laboratory at his headquarters pondering his next course of action in regards to defeating the Bandicoots and achieving world domination. Suddenly, both groups are abducted by a mysterious white light that takes them to a large coliseum somewhere in another galaxy. This galaxy is ruled by Emperor Velo XXVII, who plans on having the teams race for the entertainment of his subjects. He promises the Earthlings that winning the races will win them their freedom, but threatens them with the destruction of Earth if they refuse to race.

After both teams accept the challenge, Velo explains that the racers will compete on four worlds of his choosing, and promises a race against the galactic champion if the champion keys from those worlds are obtained. When Krunk, Nash, Norm, and Geary, the champions of Terra, Barin, Fenomena, and Teknee respectively, are defeated, the Earth racers go up against the galactic champion: Emperor Velo himself. The racers defeat Velo, but he refuses to send them back to Earth unless they win all of the time relics and defeat him again. Velo loses again to the Earth racers and literally explodes in a bout of fury, revealing himself to be a robot suit controlled by a small gremlin-like version of himself.

If Team Bandicoot win the race, Velo, having lost his influence over his subjects, dejectedly relinquishes his empire to the Bandicoots. Crash considers becoming the next emperor of the galaxy, but decides otherwise and gives control back to Velo in exchange for sending the Bandicoots back to Earth. If Team Cortex win the race, Velo struggles with Cortex over the possession of his scepter, only to be stopped by Tiny. Cortex uses the scepter's power in an attempt to return to Earth, but the scepter breaks and sends Cortex, N. Gin and Tiny to Terra instead. When they are confronted by the natives, Tiny repairs the scepter and is subsequently revered as a king, much to Cortex's annoyance.

== Development and release ==
The game that would become Crash Nitro Kart was initially conceptualized and developed by Traveller's Tales. The original concept involved vehicles that would sustain damage until they were reduced to a single wheel; the vehicle could be repaired by collecting special items scattered around the tracks. The character Nina Cortex, who would later appear in Crash Twinsanity, was created and designed by Duke Mighten during this stage of development. Development duties of the game were subsequently transferred to Vicarious Visions, where the game was tentatively titled Crash Team Racing 2 during pre-production.

The characters of the game were designed by series veteran Charles Zembillas, while the environments were designed by Joe Pearson (another veteran of the series), John Nevarez, Alan Simmons and Di Davies. The karts were designed by Perry Zombolis Jr. and Andy Lomerson. Zembillas, when approached to work on the game, was told by Vicarious Visions that the game would be "the last of Crash" if it was not commercially successful. Universal Interactive, recognizing that full motion video sequences have become the new norm in state-of-the-art video games, decided that Crash Nitro Kart would be the first game in the Crash Bandicoot series to feature such cinematics. The cutscenes of Crash Nitro Kart were created by Red Eye Studios; pre-production of the cutscenes was handled by Epoch Ink. The screenplay of the cutscenes was written by Dan Tanguay. The studio's eight artists were given four months to create 32 minutes of pre-rendered cinematics. The actual animation phase was to be completed in 15 weeks, breaking down to almost five shots a day or 15 seconds of animation per day for each artist. The in-game versions of the character models were built using 3ds Max and were outfitted with full inverse kinematic setups, morph targets and UV texture maps by Vicarious Visions. These models could not be ported directly into the cinematics due to their lower resolution for optimal real-time interactivity. Instead, the artists of Red Eye Studios worked from concept sketches provided by Vicarious Visions and used Alias Systems' Maya (with which the artists were more familiar) to enhance the detail of the 27 character models in the game, including the Crash Bandicoot character.

Given the task of forming the personalities of the Crash Nitro Kart cast through the full-motion videos, the Red Eye Studio artists set certain rules for how each character would carry itself by default. As animator Thomas Happ noted, "N. Gin, for example, would always default to twitchy, side-to-side glances, while Tiny would often scratch his head in confusion. There were a lot of scenes where the characters are just standing around listening to Emperor Velo talk, and we had to invent ways to personalize their mannerisms and create a uniquely 'thinking character'." To achieve the bold and deeply saturated colors and textures for the characters and environments, the artists used Maya as well as Adobe Photoshop and Corel Painter. While the artists adapted many of the sets and props in the cinematics from in-game counterparts, they recreated the majority of these objects from scratch in order to add surrealism to the scenery. The cinematics were completed well in advance of the four-month deadline. The console version of Crash Nitro Kart was announced by Vivendi Universal prior to the Electronic Entertainment Expo of 2003. Crash Nitro Kart is among the first titles to be developed using the Intrinsic Alchemy middleware technology following Vicarious Visions' purchase of its rights from the defunct Intrinsic Graphics.

The soundtrack of the game was composed by Ashif Hakik and Todd Masten of Womb Music, while the sound design was created by New Media Audio, a subsidiary of Technicolor Creative Services. Hakik composed the game's main menu theme, cutscenes and second half of the in-game soundtrack, while Masten composed the first half. The main menu theme was created by Hakik as his pitch to obtain the job of co-composing the game, and he has called it one of his favorite video game compositions. Masten was contracted to co-create the score for the game after leaving Vicarious Visions and returning to California from New York. Based on his research of the Crash Bandicoot series' "very recognizable" sound palette, Masten incorporated numerous percussive tonal instruments into the score of Crash Nitro Kart. Masten extensively used the then-recently released Reason program by Propellerhead Software in the writing of his score for the game, making Crash Nitro Kart Masten's first entirely digital score. Comparing their two styles, Hakik described Masten's music as harmonically "smart like all Crash music" and his own music as motif-based and influenced by music created for 8 and 16-bit game consoles. Universal Interactive was so satisfied with the score that they asked Masten to remix a custom soundtrack disc as part of a special package deal with Walmart; Crash Nitro Kart is the second video game composed by Masten to receive a soundtrack release. The game is also among the first to support the 5.1 surround sound format.

The voice cast of the game consists of Clancy Brown as Doctor Neo Cortex and Uka Uka, Mel Winkler as Aku Aku, Kevin Michael Richardson as Crunch Bandicoot and an advisor of Velo, Debi Derryberry as Coco Bandicoot and Polar, Steven Blum as Emperor Velo XXVII and Crash Bandicoot, Billy West as Nash and Zam, Dwight Schultz as Dingodile and Fake Crash, Marshall R. Teague as Krunk, John DiMaggio as Tiny Tiger, Michael Ensign as Doctor Nefarious Tropy, Quinton Flynn as Doctor N. Gin and Nitrous Oxide, André Sogliuzzo as Norm and Zem, Paul Greenberg as Geary and Pura and Tom Bourdon as N. Trance and an advisor of Velo.

Crash Nitro Kart was released for the PlayStation 2, Xbox, and GameCube in North America on November 11, 2003, and in Europe on November 28, 2003; The PlayStation 2 version was re-released in the three-disc "Crash Bandicoot Action Pack" compilation (alongside Crash Twinsanity and Crash Tag Team Racing) in the United States on June 12, 2007, and in Europe on July 20, 2007.

== Reception ==
Reception

Aggregate score
Aggregator	Score
Metacritic	(Xbox) 70/100 (PS2) 69/100 (GC) 66/100

Review scores
Publication	Score
Electronic Gaming Monthly	5.5/10, 6/10, 5.5/10
Eurogamer	7/10
Famitsu	27/40
Game Informer	7/10
GamePro	4.5/5
GameSpot	7.5/10
GameSpy	2/5
GameZone	8.5/10
IGN	7.4/10
Nintendo Power	3.4/5
Nintendo World Report	6.5/10
Official U.S. PlayStation Magazine	7/10
Official Xbox Magazine (US)	8.3/10
Play	B−
PlayStation: The Official Magazine	8/10
TeamXbox	8.1/10

The console versions of Crash Nitro Kart received "mixed or average" reviews according to Metacritic. Manny LaMancha of GamePro concluded that the gameplay of Crash Nitro Kart was addictive though not innovative. PlayStation: The Official Magazine said that Crash Nitro Kart was "satisfying and challenging at the same time" and "a great way to fill that need for speed." Nintendo Power praised the karts as "fast" and the power-ups as "creative". Official PlayStation Magazine concluded that "Vicarious Visions did all it could to emulate the Naughty Dog classic (Crash Team Racing) and just added a PS2 coat of paint." Play magazine said that the game was "a little generic and heavily recycled, but the powerslide system from CTR pulls it together." Matt Helgeson of Game Informer dismissed the game as "probably one of the least exciting racing titles I've played recently." Demian Linn of Electronic Gaming Monthly noted that the gameplay was "nearly identical to Crash Team Racing's, even down to the speed-boosting wumpa fruits, so if you loved it before, you'll still love it, and if not... not."

The game's controls were well received. LaMancha concluded that the controls were easy to pick up, but hard to master. Official Xbox Magazine praised the game's "solid control" and "innovative boost system". Michael Lafferty of GameZone said that the interface was "simple to use" and that the game requires no learning curve. Tony Guidi of TeamXbox noted that the "simplistic" controls allowed the game to be played by anyone and that due to the different boosting and sliding techniques, "mastering the control will separate the great racers from the newbs." Ryan Davis of GameSpot stated that while the powerslide system "can give you a serious advantage in the race ... [it] is also very difficult to pull off, requiring flawless timing." Steven Rodriguez of Nintendo World Report said that the karts "control pretty nicely, but can be hard to handle consistently at top speed," and added that power sliding was "easy to do".

The graphics of the game were positively received. LaMancha said that the visuals were brightly colored and smoothly animated and noted that the Xbox version's graphics were slightly cleaner than the PlayStation 2 version. Lafferty praised the environments as "lush and richly textured" and the cutscenes as "very well done". Guidi commended the graphics as "clean and crisp" and added that the cutscenes were "beautifully polished". Davis noted that "Crash Nitro Kart maintains the brightly colored, cartoony look that has been the hallmark of past Crash Bandicoot games, though with slightly upgraded graphics. Ed Lewis of IGN said that the graphics for the single-player modes were "bright and cheery and smooth", but decreased in quality in the multiplayer modes. Kristan Reed of Eurogamer concluded that "CNK stays in exactly the cutesy ballpark you'd expect from the Day-Glo series, neither straying in any way from the generic cartoon worlds of old nor providing any graphical trickery that surprises hardened gamers looking for a splash of eye candy with their cartoon frippery." Rodriguez noted that "if you've played any of the other Crash Bandicoot games out there, then you have a pretty good idea what this one looks like." Russ Fischer of GameSpy said that the game "some nice graphics, which use a solid framerate and loads of color to capture the old Crash magic."

The audio received mixed reception. LaMancha said that the in-game voice acting (provided by such stars as Debi Derryberry and Billy West) was "clear and entertaining". Guidi also noted that the character voices were "done well" and that the music "isn't annoying". However, Lafferty stated that the music can become "a little tiring" and "annoying" after a while. Davis concluded that the sound was "respectable", but added that the "attitude" of the character sounds bites seemed "forced". Lewis said that the "saving grace" of the "Looney Tunes-style repartee and sound effects" is that "it was done professionally and while it's pretty silly if you listen to it, it doesn't grate and get under the skin as other games can." He added that the music was "bouncy and peppy and, once again, cartoony". Rodriguez described the music and sound effects as "generic" and "plain" respectively, and noted that the best part of the game's audio was "that sexy talking mask that gives you advice between races, but even he gets rather annoying."

== Bibliography ==
- Crash Nitro Kart Instruction Booklet. Fresno, California, United States of America: Universal Interactive. 2003.
- Manzo, Mark (2003). Prima's Official Strategy Guide: Crash Nitro Kart. Roseville, California, United States of America: Prima Games. ISBN 0-7615-4408-9.
