= Love Comes to the Executioner =

- Directed by: Kyle Bergersen
- Written by: Kyle Bergersen
- Produced by: Steve Bicke; Philippe Denham; Doug Draizin; Mark Dziak
- Starring: Jonathan Tucker; Jeremy Renner; Ginnifer Goodwin
- Cinematography: Jimmy Lindsey
- Edited by: Sharon Rutter
- Music by: Josh Mancell
- Release date: August 15, 2006
- Running time: 89 minutes
- Country: United States
- Language: English

Love Comes to the Executioner is a 2006 American film directed and written by Kyle Bergersen, starring Jonathan Tucker, Jeremy Renner, and Ginnifer Goodwin.

== Plot summary ==
A young man becomes the executioner at a prison, where his brother sits on death row. Things get more surreal when he falls in love with his ex-girlfriend.

== Cast ==
- Jonathan Tucker as Heck Prigusivac
- Jeremy Renner as Chick Prigusivac
- Ginnifer Goodwin as Dori Dumchovic
- Christine Ebersole as Miriam Prigusivac
- Michael Fairman as Warden Stankovic
- Sean Sweeney as Bix
- Neil Giuntoli as Harry Grmusa
- Googy Gress as Doc Zdravkovic
- Bodhi Elfman as Krist Skolnik
