= Mel Winkler =

American actor (1941–2020)

- Born: October 23, 1941; St. Louis, Missouri, U.S.
- Died: June 12, 2020 (aged 78); Los Angeles, California, U.S.
- Burial place: Riverside National Cemetery
- Occupation: Actor
- Years active: 1969–2008

Mel Winkler (October 23, 1941 – June 12, 2020) was an American actor. He voiced Aku Aku in the Crash Bandicoot video games, from Crash Bandicoot: Warped to Crash Twinsanity.

== Early life ==
Winkler was born in St. Louis, Missouri, on October 23, 1941.

== Career ==
Between the 1970s and 1980s, he moved to his home town St. Louis and New York City. Though Winkler mostly appeared in minor live-action roles, such as Melvin in Doc Hollywood, He also spent time on Broadway, appearing in The Great White Hope in 1968, in August Wilson's Joe Turner's Come and Gone in 1988 and in Neil Simon's Proposals from 1997 to 1998. He voiced of the guardian mask Aku Aku in the Crash Bandicoot series, Lucius Fox in The New Batman Adventures and Johnny Snowman in the TV series Oswald.

== Death ==
Winkler died in his sleep from unknown causes in Los Angeles, California, on June 12, 2020, at the age of 78. Crash Bandicoot 4: It's About Time was dedicated in his memory.

== Filmography ==
=== Film ===
Year	Title	Role	Notes
1972	Across 110th Street	7-11 Club Manager	
1973	The Filthiest Show in Town	Man from Feces	Segment: "Commercials"
1977	The Day the Music Died	J.J.	Documentary film
1991	Convicts	Jackson Hall	
1991	Doc Hollywood	Melvin	
1995	Devil in a Blue Dress	Joppy	
1996	City Hall	Detective Albert Holly	
1997	A Life Less Ordinary	Frank Naville	
2005	Coach Carter	Coach White	
2008	The Disciple	Father	Final film role

=== Television ===
Year	Title	Role	Notes
1969–1970	The Doctors	Dr. Simon Harris	
1986	As the World Turns	Leonard Franklin	1 episode
1994	Madman of the People	Sandman	Episode: "It's a Mad, Mad, Mad, Mad Christmas"
1995	Star Trek: Voyager	Jack Hayes	Episode: "The 37's"
1996	Babylon 5	Reverend Will Dexter	Episode: "And the Rock Cried Out, No Hiding Place"
1996	Superman: The Animated Series	Commissioner Henderson (voice)	Episode: "Feeding Time"
1997–1999	The New Batman Adventures	Lucius Fox (voice)	4 episodes
2001	The Invisible Man	Walter	Episode: "Going Postal"
2001–2003	Oswald	Johnny the Snowman (US voice)	
2004	NYPD Blue	Lonnie Parker	Episode: "Common Knowledge"
2005	Their Eyes Were Watching God	Logan Killicks	TV movie
2005	Numbers	Vincent	Episode: "Counterfeit Reality"
2005	The Shield	Maurice Webster	Episode: "Doghouse"
2005	Blind Justice	Lester	Episode: "In Your Face"
2007	Girlfriends	Foster	Episode: "Operation Does She Yield"
2007	The Unit	Avery Flowers	Episode: "Gone Missing"

=== Video games ===
Year	Title	Voice role	Notes
1998	Crash Bandicoot: Warped	Aku Aku	
1999	Crash Team Racing	Aku Aku	
2001	Crash Bandicoot: The Wrath of Cortex	Aku Aku	
2003	Crash Nitro Kart	Aku Aku	
2004	Crash Twinsanity	Aku Aku	
