= Steel Horizon =

2007 video game

- Developer: Climax Group
- Publisher: Konami
- Platforms: PlayStation Portable; Nintendo DS
- Release: Nintendo DS; March 20, 2007; PlayStation Portable; July 2, 2007
- Genres: Turn-based strategy, Real-time tactics
- Modes: Single player, Multiplayer

Steel Horizon is a turn-based strategy game developed by British studio Climax Group and published by Konami for the Sony PlayStation Portable and Nintendo DS. It was released in March 2007 in the United States for the Nintendo DS, with a later release for the PlayStation Portable in July 2007.

The game takes place at sea, during World War II, where the player, an American captain, commands allied forces against the axis forces. The game also features a multiplayer mode where players can battle rival players.

There are several different playable ships. These include battleships, aircraft carriers, submarines, destroyers, battlecruisers, cruisers, PT boats, repair ships, cargo ships, landing craft and minelayers. Every ship has a special move that can be triggered during tactical battle. Aircraft carriers can use ace pilot. In the beginning the player must choose between 3 different types of upgradeable ships, a destroyer, a battleship, and a submarine. The enemies do not vary if the player chose any of them. They are standard linear enemies.

== Reception ==
Reception

Aggregate score
Aggregator	Score
Metacritic	DS: 42/100

Review scores
Publication	Score
GameSpot	DS: 3.6/10; PSP: 4.5/10
GameSpy	1.5/5
IGN	DS: 3.5/10; PSP: 3/10
Nintendo World Report	3/10
Pocket Gamer	2.5/5

Steel Horizon received negative reviews upon release. On Metacritic, the DS version of the game holds a score of 42/100 based on 15 reviews.

GameSpot gave the game scores of 3.6/10 for the DS version and 4.5/10 for PSP version, praising the story but criticizing the low difficulty, the visual effects being simplistic, and the soundtrack being repetitive. IGN gave the game scores of 3.5/10 for the DS version and 3/10 for the PSP version, with criticism being directed towards the game's graphics, sound effects, interface, and gameplay during the battle sequences.
