= Josh Mancell =

American composer

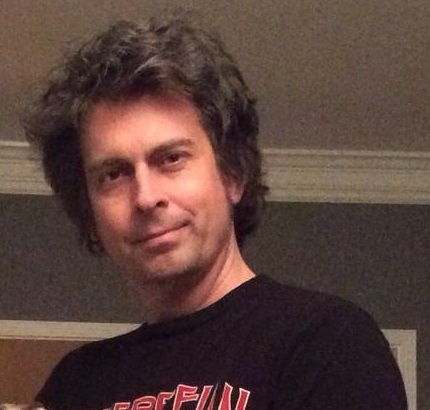
- Mancell in 2015

Background information
- Born: Ann Arbor, Michigan, U.S.
- Genres: Video game; synth-pop; punk rock; garage rock; acid jazz; lounge; power pop; soul; surf; electronic; psychedelic rock; pop; post-punk
- Occupations: Composer; music programmer; musician
- Instruments: Piano; drums; guitar; timpani; vibraphone; percussion
- Years active: 1992–present
- Website: joshmancell.com

Josh Mancell is an American composer and multi-instrumentalist who writes music for film, television, and video games. He is best known for his work on the Crash Bandicoot and Jak and Daxter series of video games.

Mancell has received two Daytime Emmy Award nominations for his work on the children's television series, Clifford the Big Red Dog.

== Early life and education ==
Mancell attended Sarah Lawrence College.

As a child, Mancell learned to play the piano, drums, and guitar and was a "rabid record geek". The exposure of playing music in different types of bands (such as punk rock, jazz, marching bands, and orchestras), combined with fandom in many genres, led Mancell to pursue a composing career. He was encouraged by his college professors to move to Los Angeles to write music for film and television.

== Career ==
Mancell has developed a successful career writing musical scores for film and television. In film, he has scored a range of films such as Bongwater (starring Luke Wilson, Alicia Witt and Jack Black) and Love Comes to the Executioner (starring Jonathan Tucker, Ginnifer Goodwin and Jeremy Renner) as well as contributing music to the cult indie Chuck & Buck (Independent Spirit Award winner).

Mancell's music has been used for the animated television shows Gary the Rat (starring Kelsey Grammer), Shorty McShorts' Shorts (starring Wilmer Valderrama), and Clifford the Big Red Dog (starring John Ritter), which has earned him two Emmy nominations.

Mancell is known for his music in video games including Sony's Crash Bandicoot and Jak and Daxter series, and other titles such as Johnny Mnemonic: The Interactive Action Movie and Interstate '82. This work was done with the assistance of Mutato Muzika, the music production company which Mark Mothersbaugh formed with several other former members of Devo including his brother, Bob Mothersbaugh.

== Musical groups ==
Mancell has been a member of the following bands and musical groups outside of his solo composing career:

- The Millionaires – punk rock/garage band (1995–1996)
- Uluteka – acid jazz/lounge band (1996)
- Mutato Muzika – music production company (1992–2007)
- The Dining Room Set – power pop/mod/soul (1999)
- The Wipeouters – surf/electronic (2001)
- The Moon Upstairs – psychedelic rock (2006–2010)
- Exploding Flowers – pop/post-punk/power pop (2010–present)

== Musical style and influences ==
Mancell's influences include electronic artists such as Mouse on Mars, A Guy Called Gerald, Aphex Twin, Juan Atkins, Richard H. Kirk and Kraftwerk, as well as progressive rock band Pink Floyd. He has cited their "interesting rhythmic elements" and said that "melodically they're simple but kind of leftfield too".

== Works ==
=== Video games ===
Year	Title	Notes
1995	Johnny Mnemonic: The Interactive Action Movie	—N/a
1996	Crash Bandicoot	—N/a
1997	Crash Bandicoot 2: Cortex Strikes Back	—N/a
1998	Crash Bandicoot: Warped	—N/a
1999	Crash Team Racing	—N/a
1999	Interstate '82	—N/a
2001	Jak and Daxter: The Precursor Legacy	—N/a
2003	Jak II	with Larry Hopkins
2004	Jak 3	with Larry Hopkins
2015	Totome	—N/a
2016	Vairon's Wrath	Two tracks

=== Film ===
Year	Title	Director(s)	Notes
1997	Bongwater	Richard Sears	with Mark Mothersbaugh
1999	This is Harry Lehman	Brian King	Short film
2000	Chuck & Buck	Miguel Arteta	"Nwo Tew"
2006	Love Comes to the Executioner	Kyle Bergersen	—N/a
2008	Milkshake	Renji Philip	Short film
2008	Stanley	Renji Philip	Short film
2009	The Lights	John Sjogren	—N/a
2010	Love & Other Unstable States of Matter	David Marmor	Short film
2011	Eat the Sun	Peter Sorcher	Documentary
2011	The Dude	Jeff Feuerzeig	Short documentary
2012	Cheesecake Casserole	Renji Philip	—N/a
2013	A Star for Rose	Daniel Yost	—N/a
2015	Dirty Laundry	Renji Philip	Short film

=== Television ===
Year	Title	Notes
1992	Adventures in Wonderland	with Mark Mothersbaugh
1994	Futurequest	
2000	Clifford the Big Red Dog	with Mark Mothersbaugh
2002	The Groovenians	Mark Mothersbaugh, Bob Casale, Albert Fox, Al Mothersbaugh, Bob Mothersbaugh, Andrew Todd, and Pat Irwin (additional music)
2003	Gary the Rat	
2006	Short McShorts' Shorts	Episode "Dudley and Nestor Do Nothing"
2011	The Bite-Sized Adventures of Sam Sandwich	
