= Crash Bandicoot: Warped =

1998 video game

- North American box art
- Developer: Naughty Dog
- Publisher: Sony Computer Entertainment
- Director: Jason Rubin
- Producers: David Bowry; Grady Hunt; Roppyaku Tsurumi
- Designer: Evan Wells
- Programmers: Andy Gavin; Stephen White; Greg Omi
- Artists: Bob Rafei; Charles Zembillas; Erik Panglilinan
- Writer: Jason Rubin
- Composer: Josh Mancell
- Series: Crash Bandicoot
- Platform: PlayStation
- Release: NA: November 3, 1998; EU: December 11, 1998
- Genre: Platform
- Mode: Single-player

Crash Bandicoot: Warped, known in Europe as Crash Bandicoot 3: Warped, is a 1998 platform game developed by Naughty Dog and published by Sony Computer Entertainment for the PlayStation. It is the third game in the Crash Bandicoot video game series following Crash Bandicoot 2: Cortex Strikes Back. The game's story takes place immediately after the events of the second game. When the ruins of Doctor Neo Cortex's space station crash-land on Earth, they unleash an evil entity known as Uka Uka, Aku Aku's evil twin brother, who joins with Cortex and the time-obsessed Doctor Nefarious Tropy as they plan to gather powerful crystals that lay scattered across time, and use their energy to enslave the Earth. The game follows the main characters Crash and Coco Bandicoot as they travel through time and prevent the villains from gathering the crystals by collecting them themselves.

Crash Bandicoot: Warped was lauded by critics, who noted a high quality in many areas, including gameplay, graphics and audio, and the game has been considered one of the best video games of all time. It went on to sell nearly 6 million units, making it one of the best-selling video games for the PlayStation. In Japan, the game surpassed the sales of its two predecessors and became the first non-Japanese PlayStation title to sell over 1 million copies in the country. A remastered version was released as a part of the Crash Bandicoot N. Sane Trilogy in 2017. A sequel, Crash Bandicoot 4: It's About Time, was released in 2020.

== Gameplay ==
The earlier levels of Crash Bandicoot: Warped are set in the daytime (top) while later levels are set in the evening (bottom).

Crash Bandicoot: Warped is a platform game in which the player controls Crash and Coco Bandicoot, who must travel through time and gather 25 crystals scattered across time before Doctor Neo Cortex and Uka Uka do so. Much of the game takes place in the Time-Twisting Machine, which acts as the hub area of the game. The Time-Twisting Machine is split up into five chambers; only the first chamber is initially available. Each chamber has five buttons that open portals to different levels. The goal in each level is to find and obtain the crystal hidden in the area. In some levels, the crystal will be located at the end of a level or must be earned by completing a specific challenge. Some levels contain a "Bonus Platform" that leads to a special bonus area, where the player must navigate through a separate area and collect everything in sight. As no lives are lost in the bonus areas, the bonus areas can be played through as often as the player desires until the bonus area can be cleared. After completing all five levels in a chamber, a sixth button that opens a portal to a boss level will appear. By defeating the boss, the next chamber will become available for play. When all 25 Crystals are found and all five boss characters are defeated, the game is won.

Crash and Coco start the game with five lives. A life is lost when they are struck by an enemy attack or suffer any other type of damage. More lives can be earned by collecting 100 "Wumpa Fruits" or breaking open a special crate to collect a life. If the player runs out of lives, the game is over. However, it can be continued by selecting "Yes" at the "Continue?" screen. Crash has the ability to jump into the air and land on an enemy character, spin in a tornado-like fashion to knock enemies off-screen, slide across the ground and perform a body slam to break certain objects. These abilities can be expanded on by defeating boss characters, often resulting in more powerful attacks or increased jumping and running prowess.

Boxes play a prominent role in Warped and can be broken with all of Crash's techniques. Boxes contain helpful items or can augment Crash's mobility. Check Point boxes allow the player to return to a specific point in the stage upon losing a life. TNT Boxes explode after a three-second fuse when jumped on, while Nitro Boxes explode upon any physical contact. All of the Nitro Boxes in a level can be detonated at once if a green-colored box with an exclamation point (!) on it is touched; contact with this box is necessary in obtaining the level's gem, as Nitro Boxes count towards the total number of boxes broken in the level.

Besides crystals, gems, both regular and colored varieties, can be collected for extra accomplishment. Gems are rewarded to the player if all of the crates in a level are broken open or if a secret area is completed. There are a total of 45 gems in the game. Colored gems are found in special levels and lead to hidden areas. There are 5 colored gems in the game. "Relics" can be won by re-entering a level after its crystal has been obtained. To obtain a Relic, the player must initiate the "Time Trial" mode by touching the floating stopwatch near the beginning of the level and race through a level in the designated time displayed before entering a level. Scattered throughout the level are yellow crates with the numbers 1, 2 or 3 on them. When these crates are broken, the timer is frozen for the number of seconds designated by the box. As no lives are lost in the Time Trial mode, the level can be played through as often as the player desires. Sapphire, Gold and Platinum Relics can be won depending on how low the player's final time is. The first five Relics the player receives unlocks access to a level in the "Secret Warp Room". Every five Relics thereafter open up another level in the Secret Warp Room. The levels in the Secret Warp Room must be won before the game can be completed.

== Plot ==
The shattered remains of Doctor Neo Cortex's space station crash-land on Earth and set free a powerful entity known as Uka Uka, the mastermind of Cortex's previous schemes. He regroups with Cortex and additionally recruits Doctor Nefarious Tropy, the inventor of a device named the Time Twisting Machine which will allow Cortex's minions to collect the Crystals and Gems from their original places in time. At the home of the Bandicoots, Aku Aku senses Uka Uka's return and informs the Bandicoots that Uka Uka is his evil twin brother, whom he had locked away long ago to defend the planet. He then leads the Bandicoots to the Time Twisting Machine, which they can use to collect the Crystals and Gems before Cortex does so. Crash and Coco venture throughout time and defeat adversaries such as Tiny Tiger, Dingodile and Doctor N. Gin. The defeat of N. Tropy causes the Time Twisting Machine to gradually fall into disarray. Upon the defeat of Cortex and Uka Uka after collecting all the crystals and gems, the Time Twisting Machine implodes and traps Uka Uka in a timeless prison with Cortex and N. Tropy who have been turned into infants.

== Development ==
Production of Warped began in January 1998, with Naughty Dog given only ten and a half months and a budget of over $2 million to complete the game. Programmers Andy Gavin, Stephen White and Greg Omi created three new gameplay engines for the game. Two of the three new engines were three-dimensional in nature and were created for the airplane and jet-ski levels; the third new engine was created for the motorcycle levels in the style of a driving simulator. The new engines combined make up a third of the game, while the other two-thirds of the game consist of the same engine used in the previous games. Jason Rubin explained that the "classic" engine and game style was preserved due to the success of the previous two games and went on to say that "were we to abandon that style of gameplay, that would mean that we would be abandoning a significant proportion of gamers out there." An arbitrary plane z-buffer was created for the jet-ski and flooded Egyptian levels of the game. To create a completely fluid feel for the water on these levels, an environment map that reflects the sky was fitted onto the surface of the water. A real shadow was given to the Crash character at the request of the Sony Computer Entertainment America producers, who were "sick of that little discus that's following him around." To create an "arcade" experience in the airplane levels and to differentiate them from flight simulators, the enemy planes were programmed to come out in front of the player and give the player ample time to shoot them before they turn around and shoot the player rather than come up behind the player and hit them from behind. The Relic system was introduced to give players a reason to return to the game after it has been completed.

The shot design and animation of the introductory sequence (left) was inspired by emotion sketches of Cortex begging for Uka Uka's forgiveness (right).

American Exitus artist Charles Zembillas, who was a character designer for the previous two games, reprised his role for Warped. Bob Rafei led concept development, art direction, level assembly and vertex lighting. Uka Uka was created as a presence that would cause Doctor Neo Cortex to cower in fear. The emotion sketches depicting Cortex begging for forgiveness inspired the shot design and animation for the game's cinematic introductory sequence. Because the game's plot involved time travel, the time-traveling Doctor Nefarious Tropy was conceptualized. Zembillas drew the first sketches of Tropy (and the doodle he created as Naughty Dog was describing the character to him) on January 22, 1998. Tropy's wearable time-traveling device was conceptualized early on in the character's design evolution and initially appeared as a belt-like contraption that featured a digital read out displaying the year Tropy intended to travel to. Tropy's piston-driven, smog-generating time machine was made to reflect his unhealthy obsession with time. The Dingodile character was conceptualized by Naughty Dog employee Joe Labbe II, who requested a character that was a cross between a dingo and a crocodile. Zembillas drew the first sketches of Dingodile on February 4, 1998. At certain points, the character alternatively wore an Australian style hat, had a "mop of scruffy hair" and walked on all fours. Naughty Dog initially wanted Dingodile to be a fire-breathing character before Zembillas suggested giving him a flamethrower to make him "much more interesting". The final sketches of Dingodile were drawn on February 12, 1998.

When conceiving Coco Bandicoot's companion in the Chinese levels, it was decided that a "cute and huggable critter" that fit the Chinese theme was needed. A panda was originally considered but was rejected due to its similarity to the polar bear seen in Cortex Strikes Back. A tiger cub, Pura, was chosen as an alternative. When creating the Triceratops chase sequences in the prehistoric levels, a minion of Doctor Cortex was initially animated riding the beast. Whenever the triceratops got stuck, it would thrash the minion around. The rider was ultimately removed for technical reasons. The Tyrannosaurus hatchling that Crash mounts in the prehistoric levels was drawn with chicken-like proportions by Rafei. The shark seen in the game's underwater levels was one of Jason Rubin's first Alias PowerAnimator models. The model was originally built for the first Crash Bandicoot game, but was not used until Warped.

The "time travel around the world" theme of Warped allowed the Naughty Dog artists to stretch beyond the limits imposed by the island-themed setting of the previous games; each time theme has distinctly unique structures and color palettes. To demonstrate the effect that color has on the mood of an environment, level sketches, such as those of the Arabian or medieval levels, were recolored to alter the depicted time of day from day to night. Naughty Dog aimed to visually distinguish Warped from previous installments by "opening up the environment" and allowing greater distances to be visible without draw-in or fog; to achieve the image of endless rolling hills and distant castles seen in the Medieval levels, level of detail was accounted for by introducing new technologies into the game engine and changing the way some of the background elements were constructed. The most detailed textures of Warped are located in the Egyptian Tomb levels in the form of decorative paintings. To keep the image of an endless highway in the motorcycle levels from being boring, roadside details such as cacti and telephone poles were added to the scenery. Additionally, distant mesas were added to help break up the horizon. To give the desert highway some character, full-service gas stations and diners were added to the roadside to evoke a "1950s America" flavor. The Great Wall of China is portrayed during its construction stage to add visual variety and provide gameplay obstacles. Initial ideas for the submerged Atlantis stage varied from an ancient Roman-esque city in ruins to a high-tech submerged city of alien origin.

The soundtrack of the game was produced by Mark Mothersbaugh and composed by Josh Mancell of Mutato Muzika. The sound effects were created by Mike Gollum, Ron Horwitz and Kevin Spears of Universal Sound Studios. Clancy Brown voiced the dual role of Doctor Neo Cortex and Uka Uka, while Brendan O'Brien voiced the dual role of Doctor N. Gin and Tiny Tiger. Additionally, Michael Ensign voiced Doctor Nefarious Tropy, William Hootkins voiced Dingodile and Mel Winkler voiced Aku Aku.

== Marketing and release ==
A small sampling of the game's levels was prominently displayed at Sony's Electronic Entertainment Expo booth in Atlanta, Georgia. Crash Bandicoot: Warped was released in North America on November 3, 1998, and in Europe on December 11, 1998. The game's release was accompanied by marketing campaigns by Sony and Pizza Hut. From March to May 1999, the game was one of five involved in the "Gimme Five" promotion, a campaign by Sony and General Mills that distributed $5 discount coupons toward select PlayStation titles through six leading General Mills breakfast cereals. The Japanese version of Crash Bandicoot: Warped was one of the first video games to support the PocketStation, a peripheral that downloads minigames from PlayStation games. A playable game demo of the Insomniac Games game Spyro the Dragon is available in the final product and can be accessed by entering a cheat code at the title screen.

== Reception ==
Reception

Aggregate score
| Aggregator | Score |
|---|---|
| Metacritic | 91/100 |

Review scores
| Publication | Score |
|---|---|
| AllGame | 4.5/5 |
| Consoles + | 94% |
| Computer and Video Games | 4/5 |
| Electronic Gaming Monthly | 9.5/10, 9/10, 9/10, 9/10 |
| EP Daily | 80% |
| Famitsu | 35/40 |
| Game Informer | 9.25/10 |
| Gamekult | 7/10 |
| GamePro | 5/5 |
| GameRevolution | B+ |
| GameSpot | 8.9/10 |
| Hyper | 87% |
| IGN | 9.1/10 |
| Jeuxvideo.com | 18/20 |
| Next Generation | 3/5 |
| Official U.S. PlayStation Magazine | 5/5 |
| PlayStation: The Official Magazine | 4.5/5 |

Warped received "universal acclaim", according to review aggregator Metacritic. Johnny Ballgame of GamePro concluded that the game was "a very strong contender for PlayStation game of the year" and that the "rowdy rowdy" gameplay will keep your head spinning for days." Official U.S. PlayStation Magazine considered the game to be "the best 2.5D platformer ever released." Ryan MacDonald of GameSpot said that Crash Bandicoot: Warped is "easily the best Crash yet," describing how all of its aspects were superior to previous installments in the series, and concluded that the game was "the most fun I've had with a 3D platform game in a long, long time." Mark Cooke of Game Revolution called the game "a barrage of good things" and said that the game's elements "all come together perfectly." Scott Alan Marriott of Allgame ("All Game Guide" at the time) considered the game to be "so impressive to watch that you'll have to keep one hand firmly below your chin to keep it from falling to the floor."

The game's graphics were lauded by critics. Johnny Ballgame praised the game's graphics as "incredibly clean" and "detailed", citing the water in the jet ski levels as "the most realistic-looking waves of any PlayStation game we've seen so far". Randy Nelson called the game "drop-dead gorgeous", detailing that "the textures are impeccable, the animation's top-notch, and the special effects kick some serious booty." Ryan MacDonald called the game "one of the most beautiful PlayStation games ever", citing the game's "smooth" character animations, "bright" and "colorful" landscapes, "gorgeous" lighting effects and a "refreshingly fast and steady" frame rate. Mark Cooke praised the game's "smooth" and "cartoonish" animation as "top of the line, bested by no other game" and its "limitless" rendering distance and "beautiful" 3D models as "the pinnacle of PlayStation rendering". However, he criticized the absence of death animations for the enemy characters. Scott Alan Marriott described the graphics as "unbelievable" and said that "everything is crystal clear, colorful, smoothly animated and extremely detailed."

The game's audio was also critically praised. Johnny Ballgame said that the sound "gets you pumped to play, especially the wicked drum beats that blare when you're charging through a level with the invincibility mask." He also commented positively on the other audio effects, such as "the boiling lava", "the raging pterodactyls" and the "zany movie voice-overs". Randy Nelson was thankful for the game's increased musical diversity in comparison to Crash Bandicoot 2: Cortex Strikes Back. Ryan MacDonald praised the music, sound effects and character voice-overs as "outstanding" and "extremely well done" and noted that the onscreen lip-synching is "almost perfectly matched to the voice." Mark Cooke said that the game's "over-exaggerated" voice-acting is "like those in good cartoons, and sometimes even better", and cited an "equally cartoonish" aspect in the music. Scott Alan Marriott described the voice-acting as "five-star quality all the way" and noted that the music "captures the level setting(s) perfectly."

=== Sales and awards ===
In its first month of release, Crash Bandicoot: Warped was the third best-selling home console game in the United States (behind The Legend of Zelda: Ocarina of Time and WCW/nWo Revenge). By February 1999, 2.9 million copies of Warped had been shipped to retailers worldwide; the NPD Group reported sell-through of 862,506 copies in North America alone by the end of January. At the 1999 Milia festival in Cannes, it took home a "Gold" prize for revenues above €15 million in the European Union during the previous year. By 2002, Warped had sold over 5.7 million units worldwide, making it the thirteenth best-selling PlayStation video game of all time. The game's success resulted in its re-release for the Sony Greatest Hits lineup on August 23, 1999, and for the Platinum Range in 2000. Crash Bandicoot: Warped was a bestseller in Japan, and was the first non-Japanese PlayStation title to receive a "Platinum Prize" in Japan for selling over 1 million units. Game Informer placed the game 26th on their top 100 video games of all time in 2001, noting the game's difficulty was not too hard like the first game and not too easy like the second game, and praised the platforming action as “fantastic”. In 2024, Christopher Cruz of Rolling Stone ranked Warped as the #4 best PlayStation game of all time; he described it as "the Platonic ideal of a Crash game", citing its improved controls, level design and graphics.

== Bibliography ==
- Universal Staff (1998). Crash Bandicoot : Warped Instruction Booklet. Sony Computer Entertainment.
