= List of atheists in film, radio, television and theatre =

This is an incomplete, non-exhaustive list of notable people in film, radio, television and theatre who are identified as atheist.

== Film, radio, television and theater ==
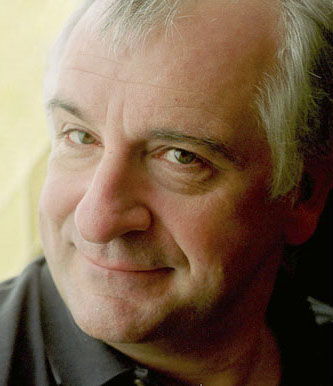
Douglas Adams

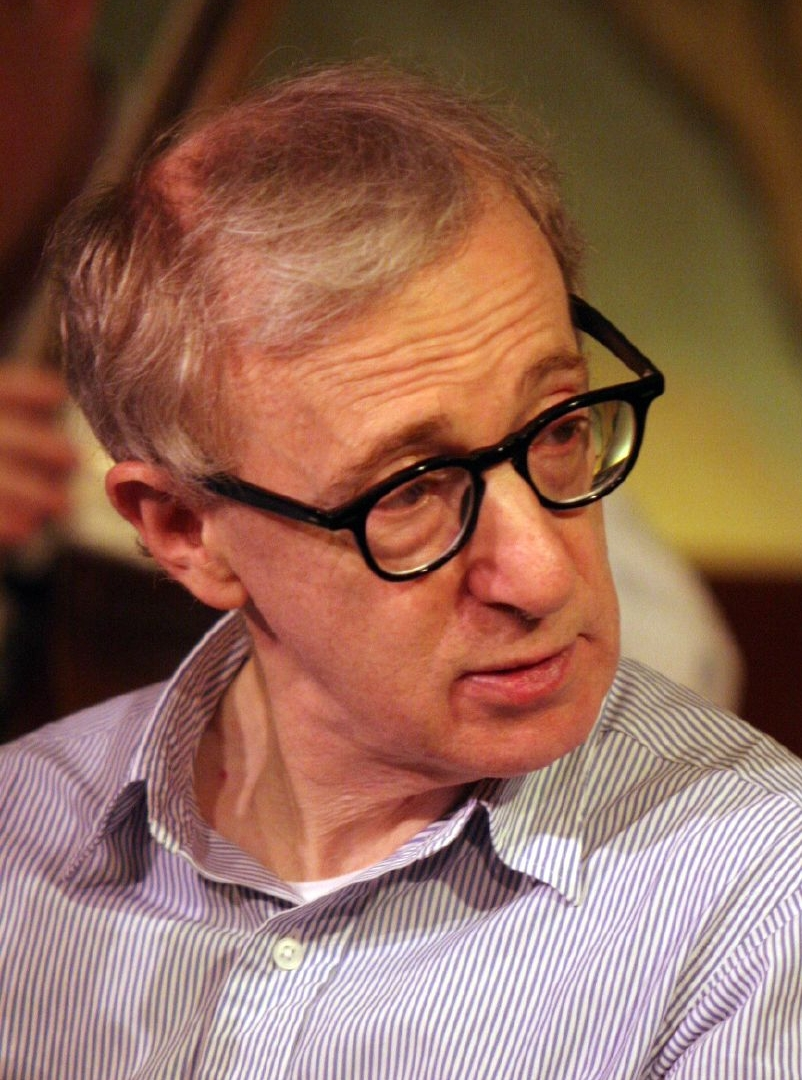
Woody Allen

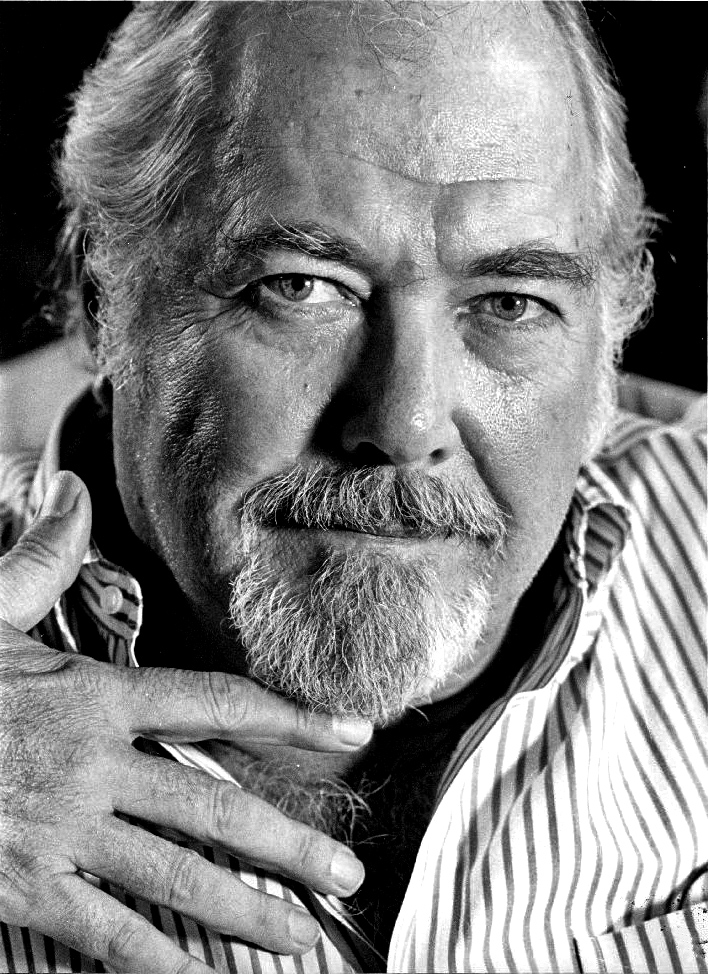
Robert Altman

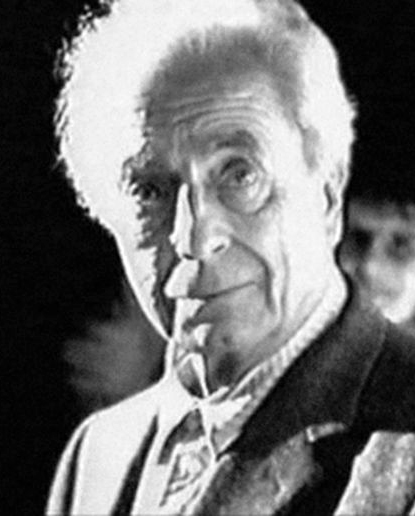
Michelangelo Antonioni

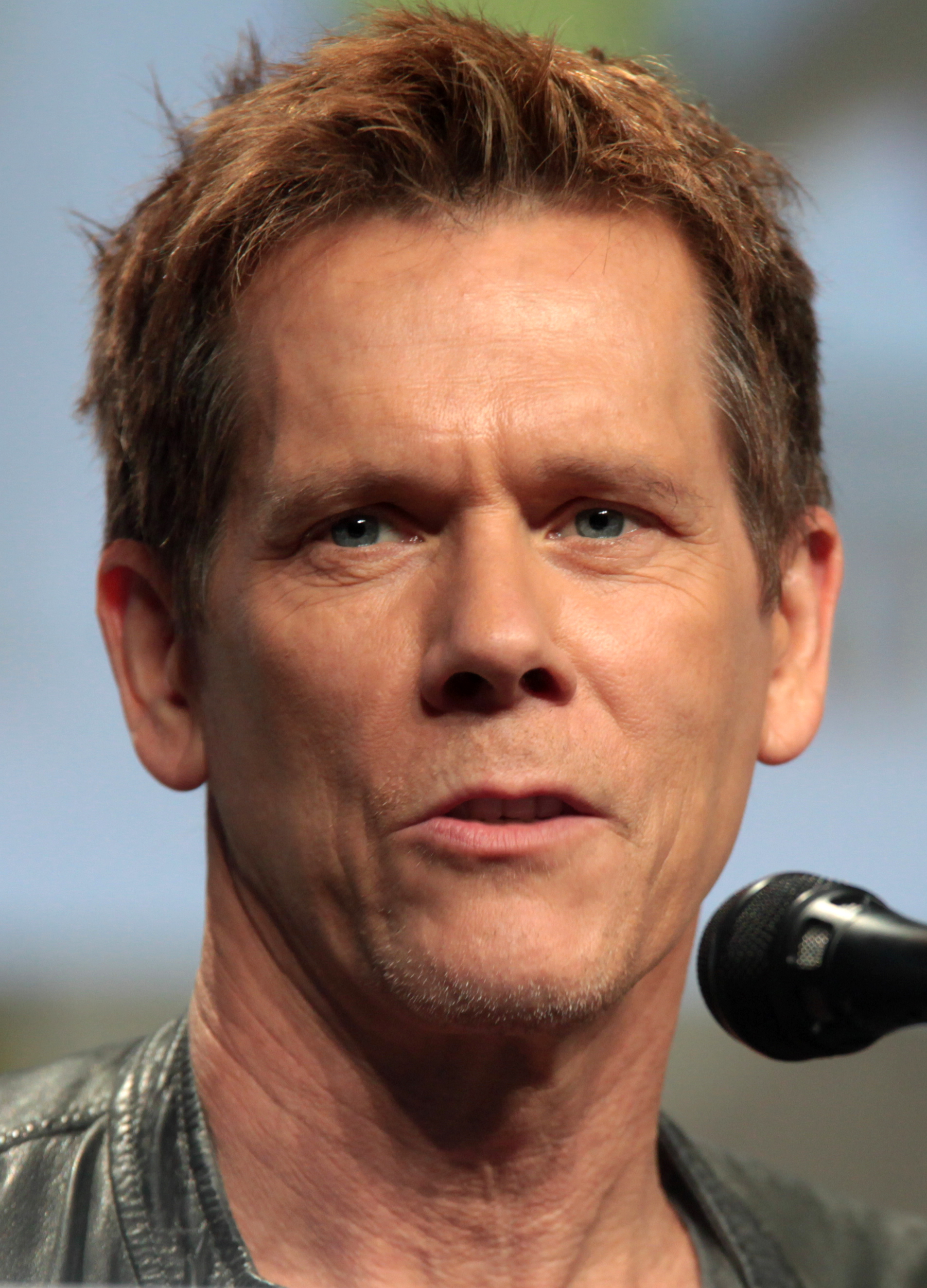
Kevin Bacon

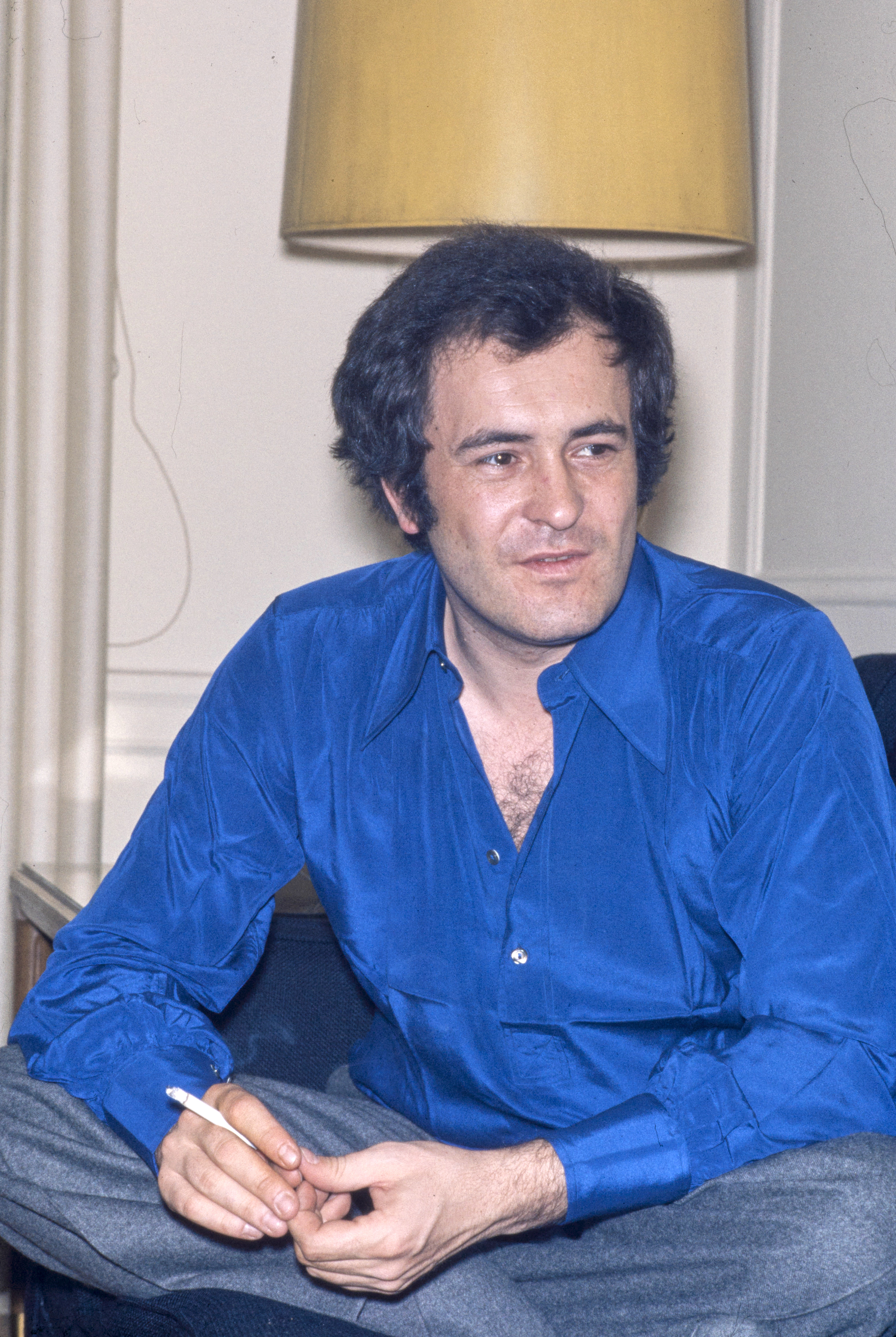
Bernardo Bertolucci

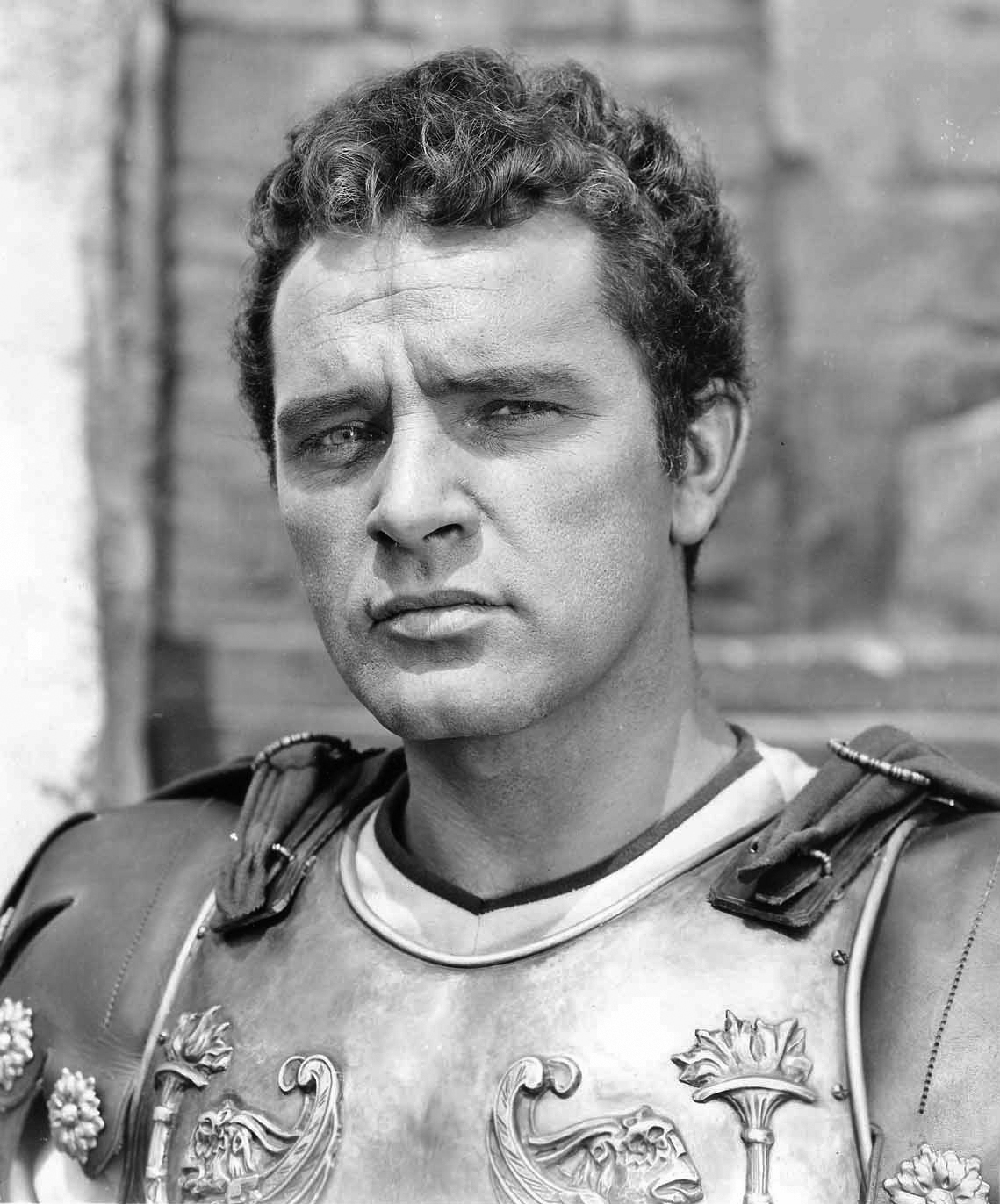
Richard Burton

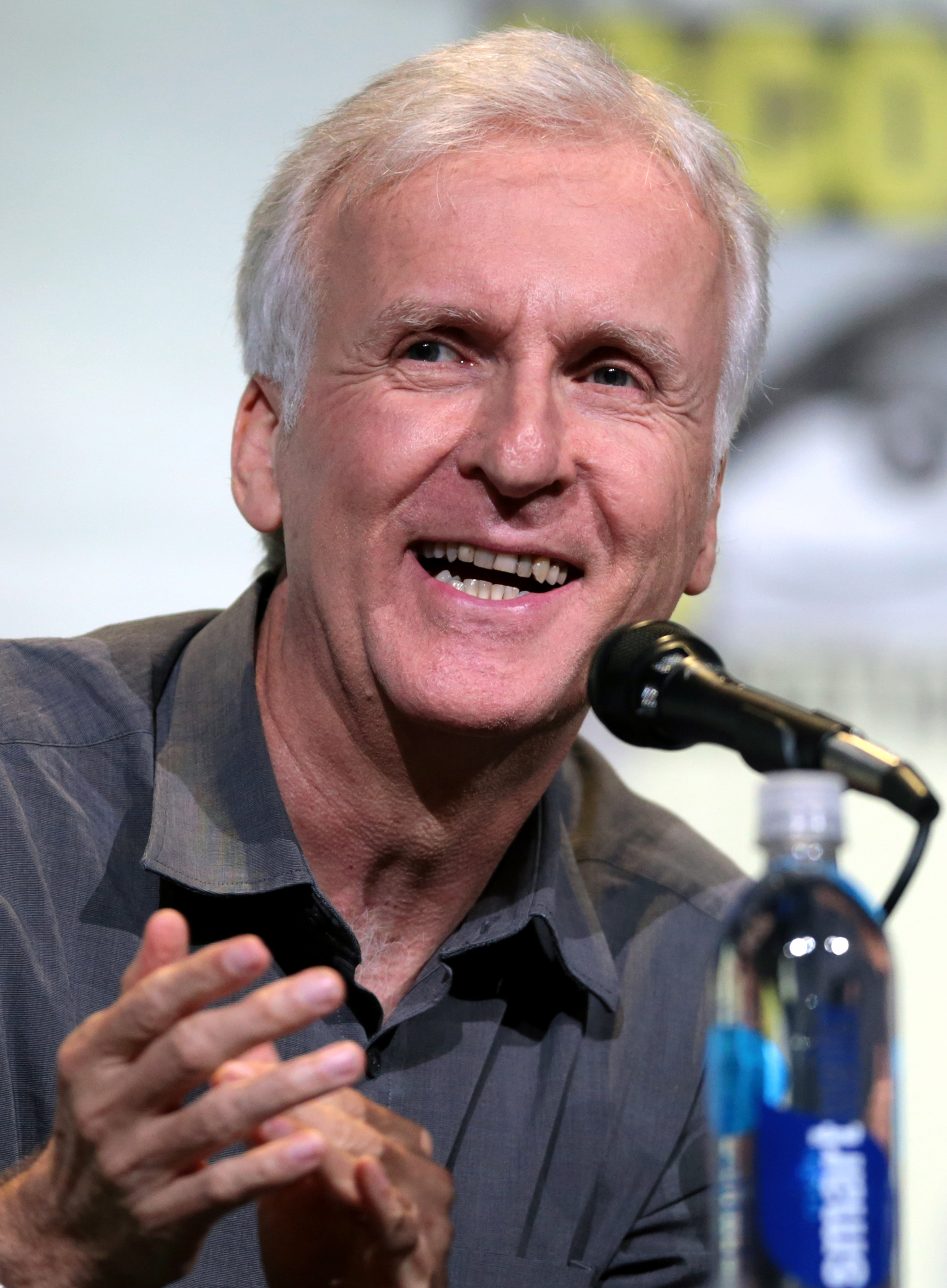
James Cameron

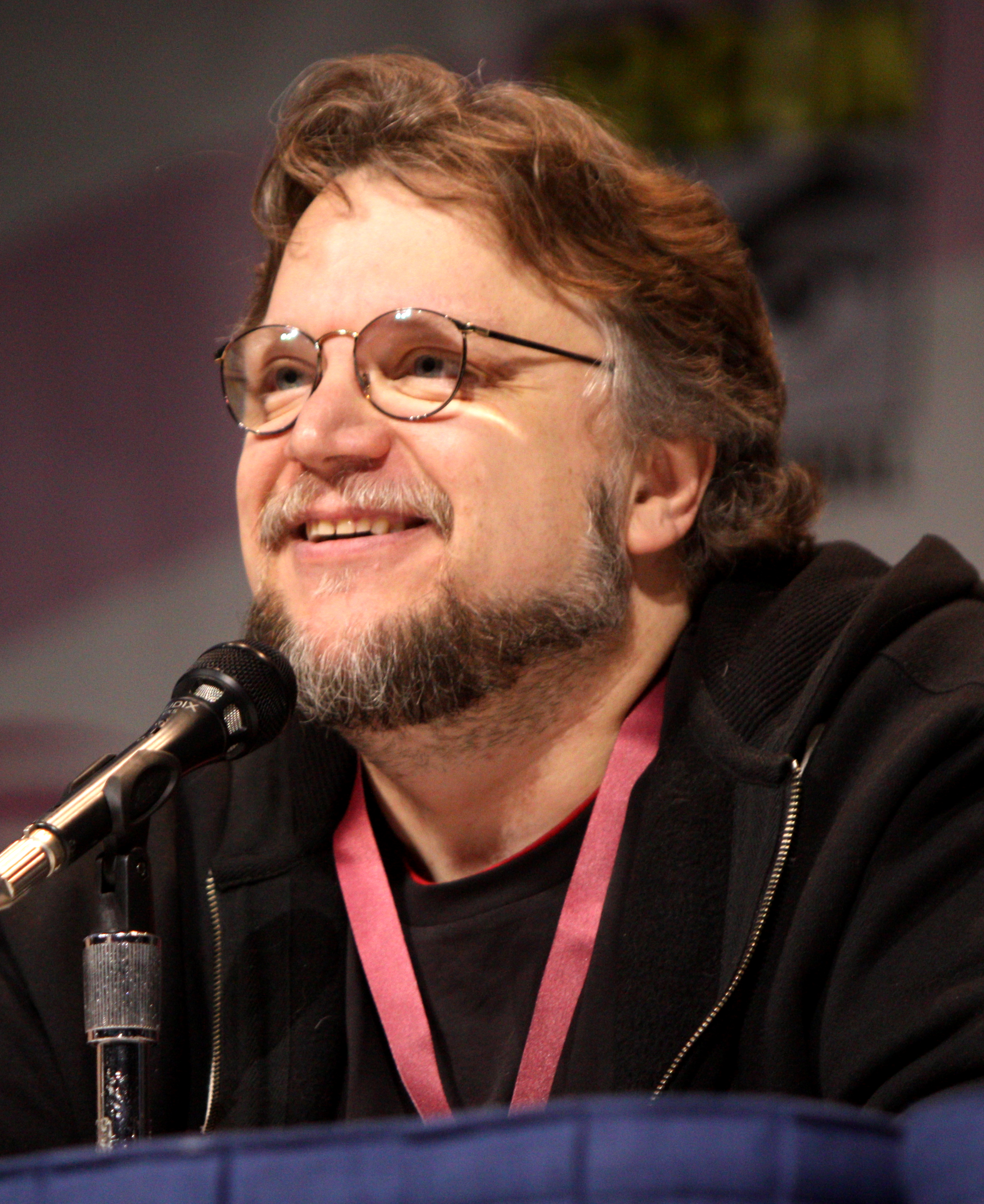
Guillermo del Toro

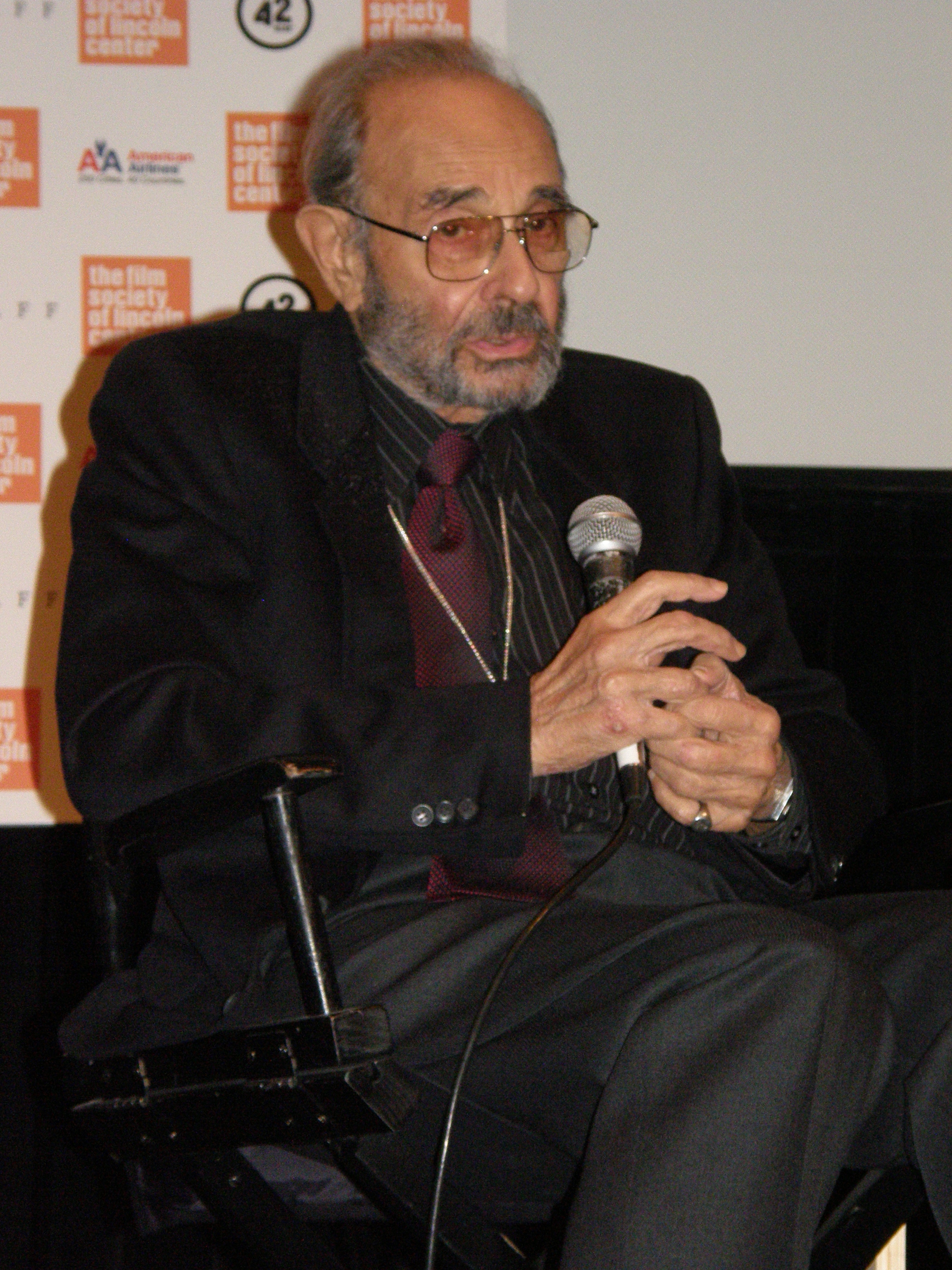
Stanley Donen

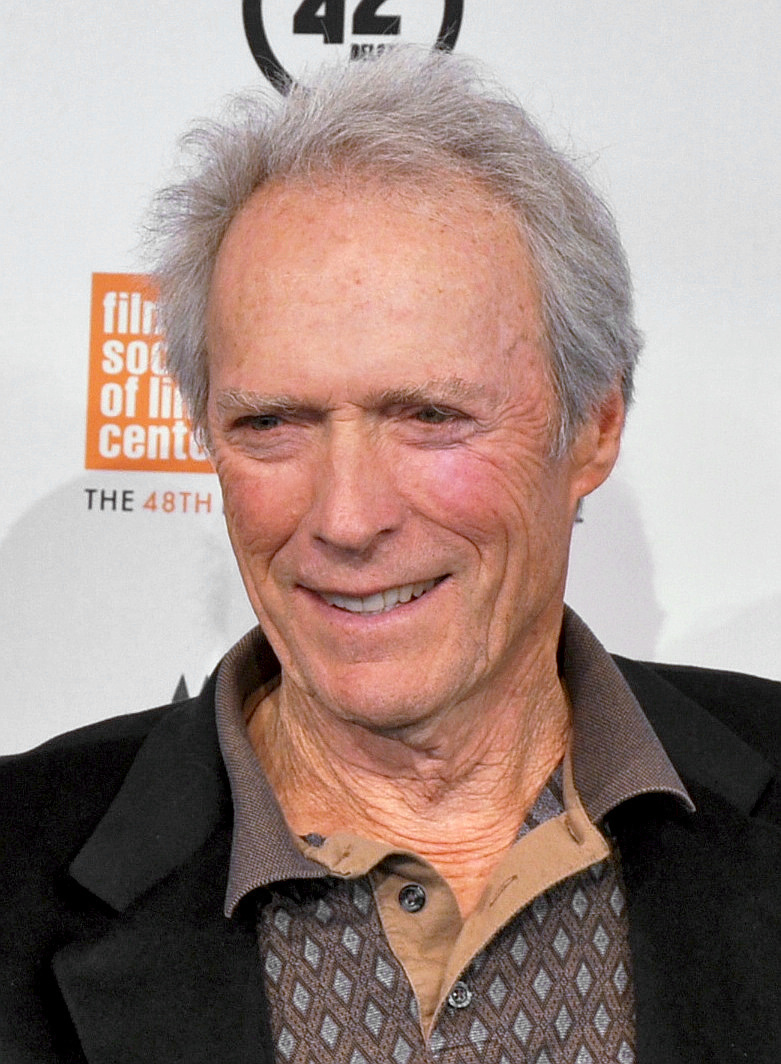
Clint Eastwood

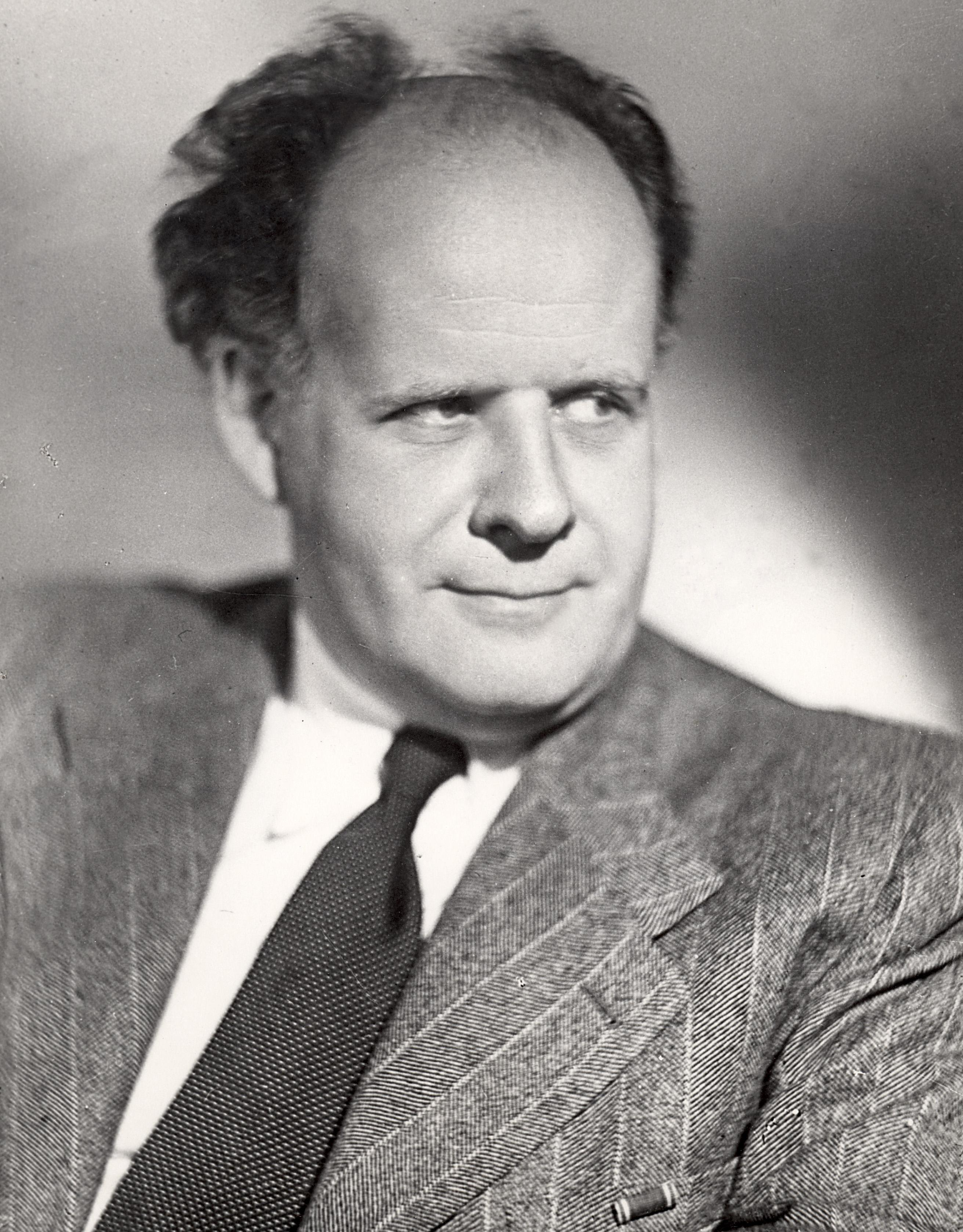
Sergei Eisenstein

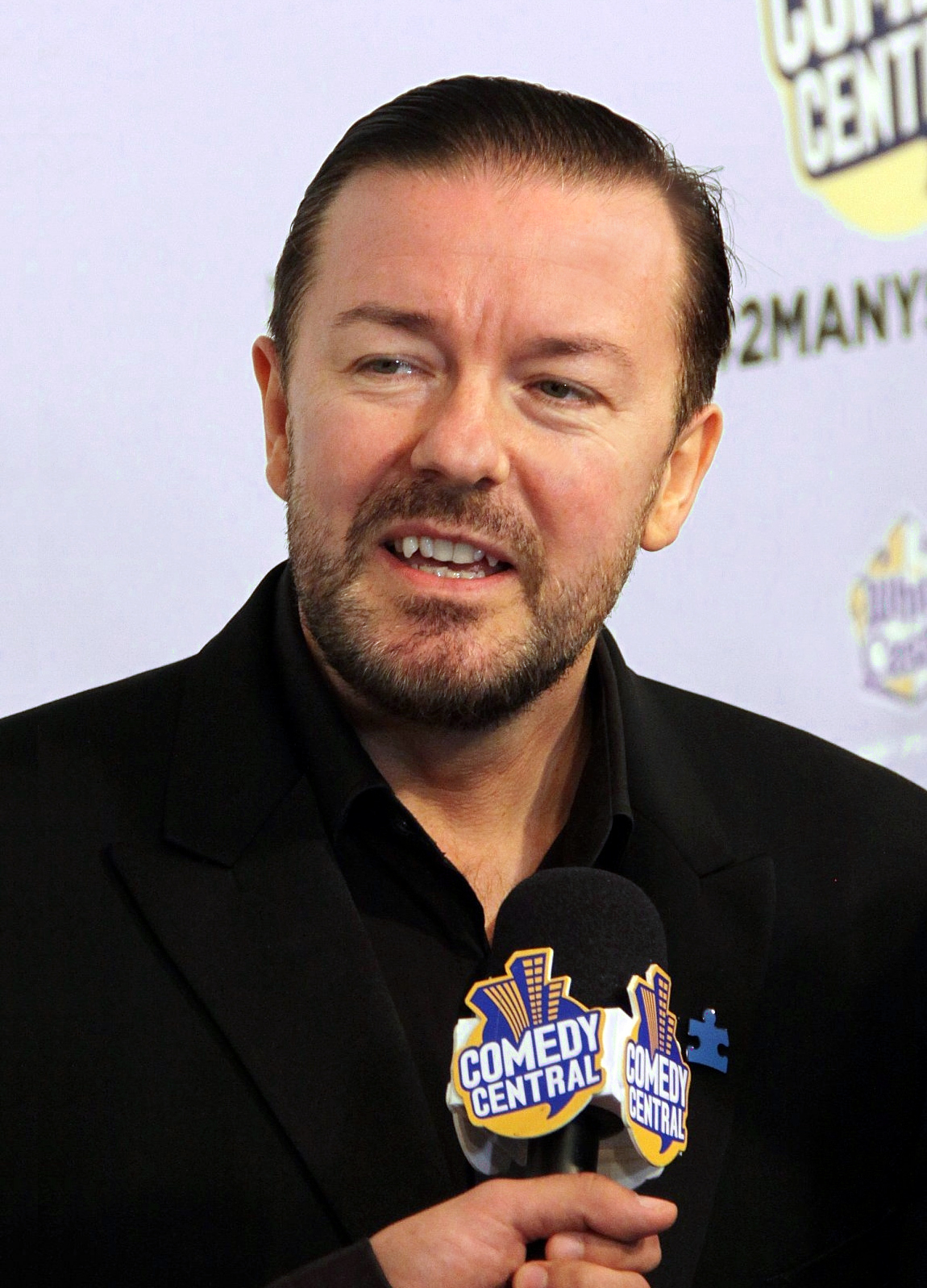
Ricky Gervais

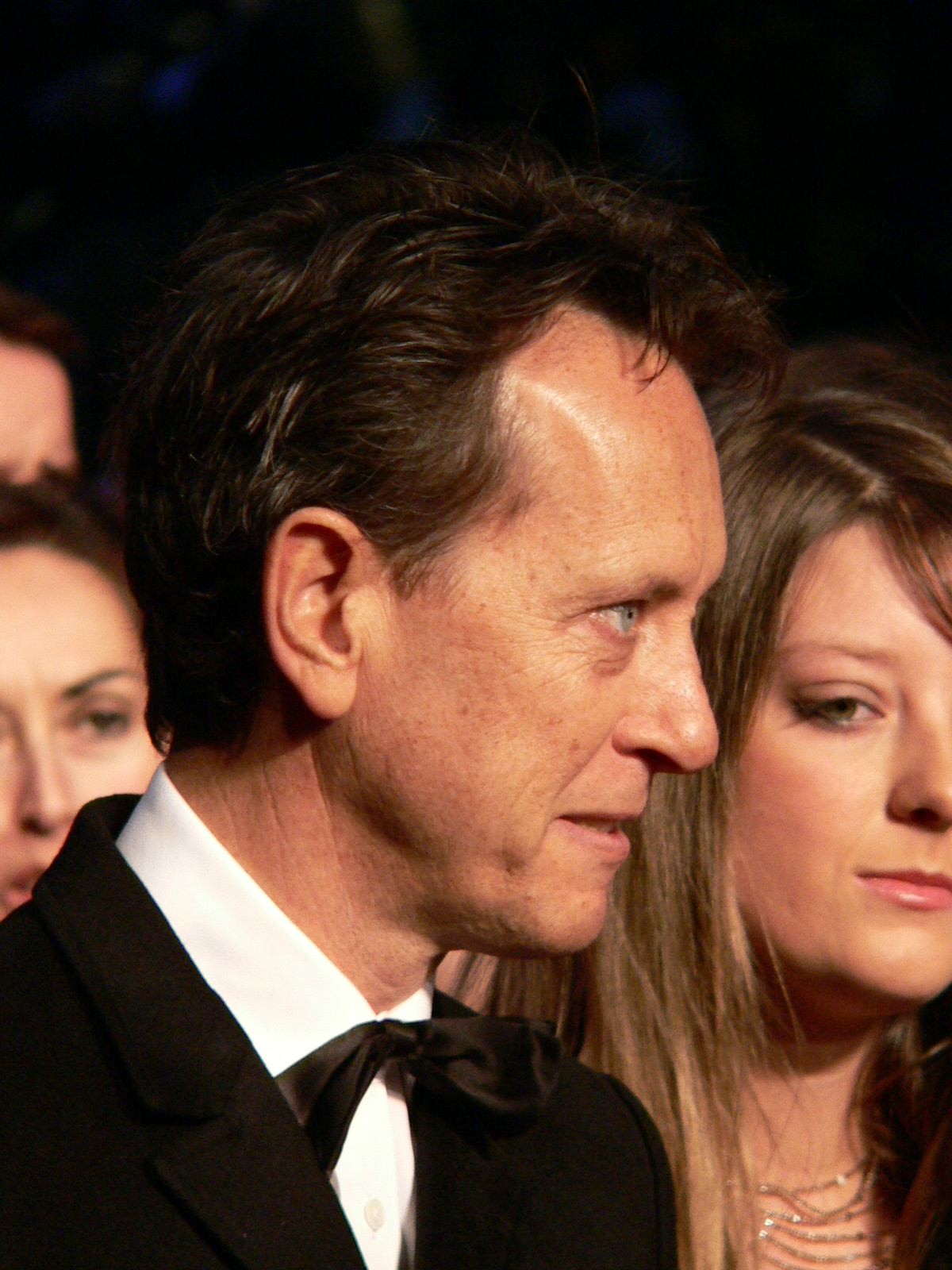
Richard E. Grant

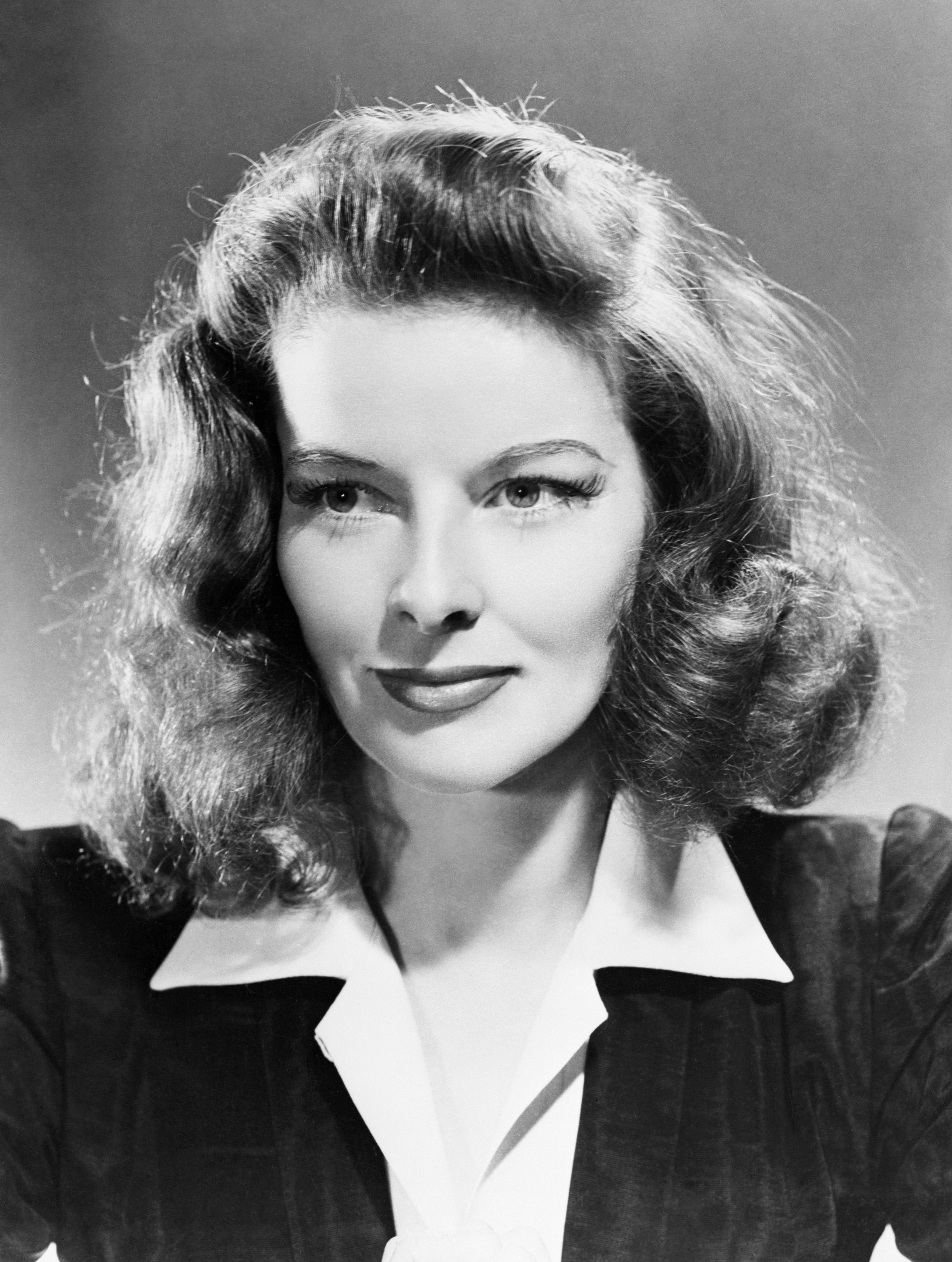
Katharine Hepburn

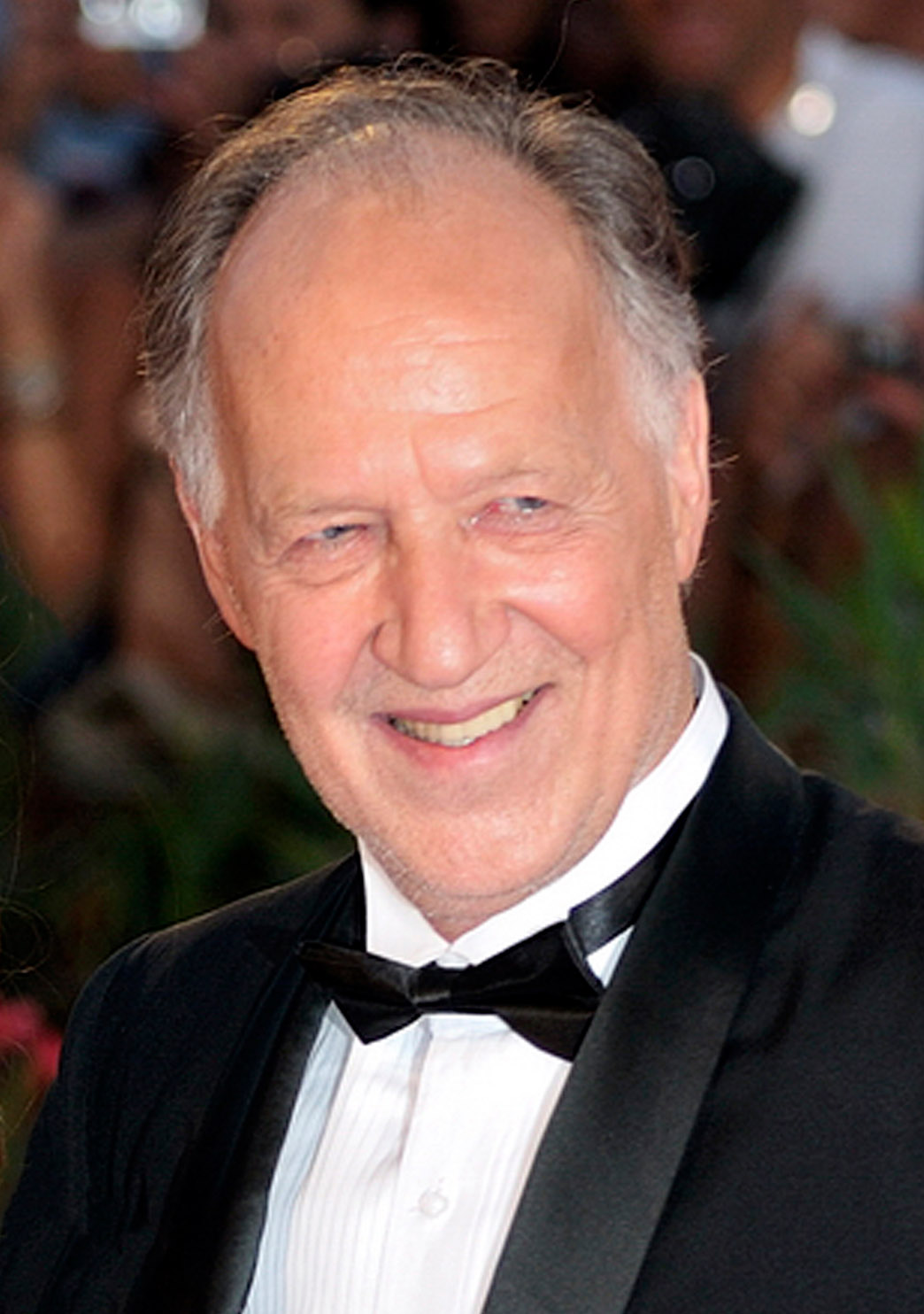
Werner Herzog

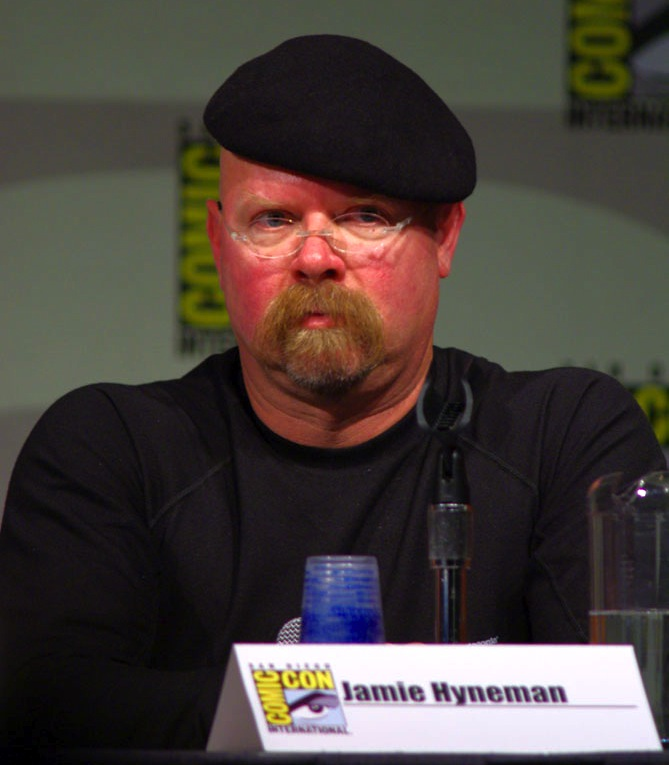
Jamie Hyneman

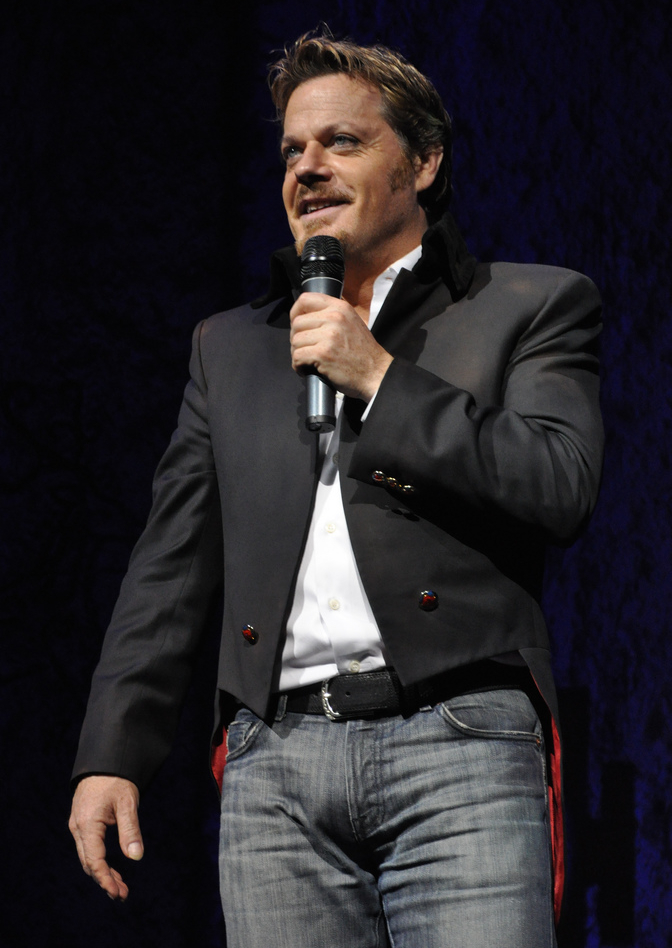
Eddie Izzard

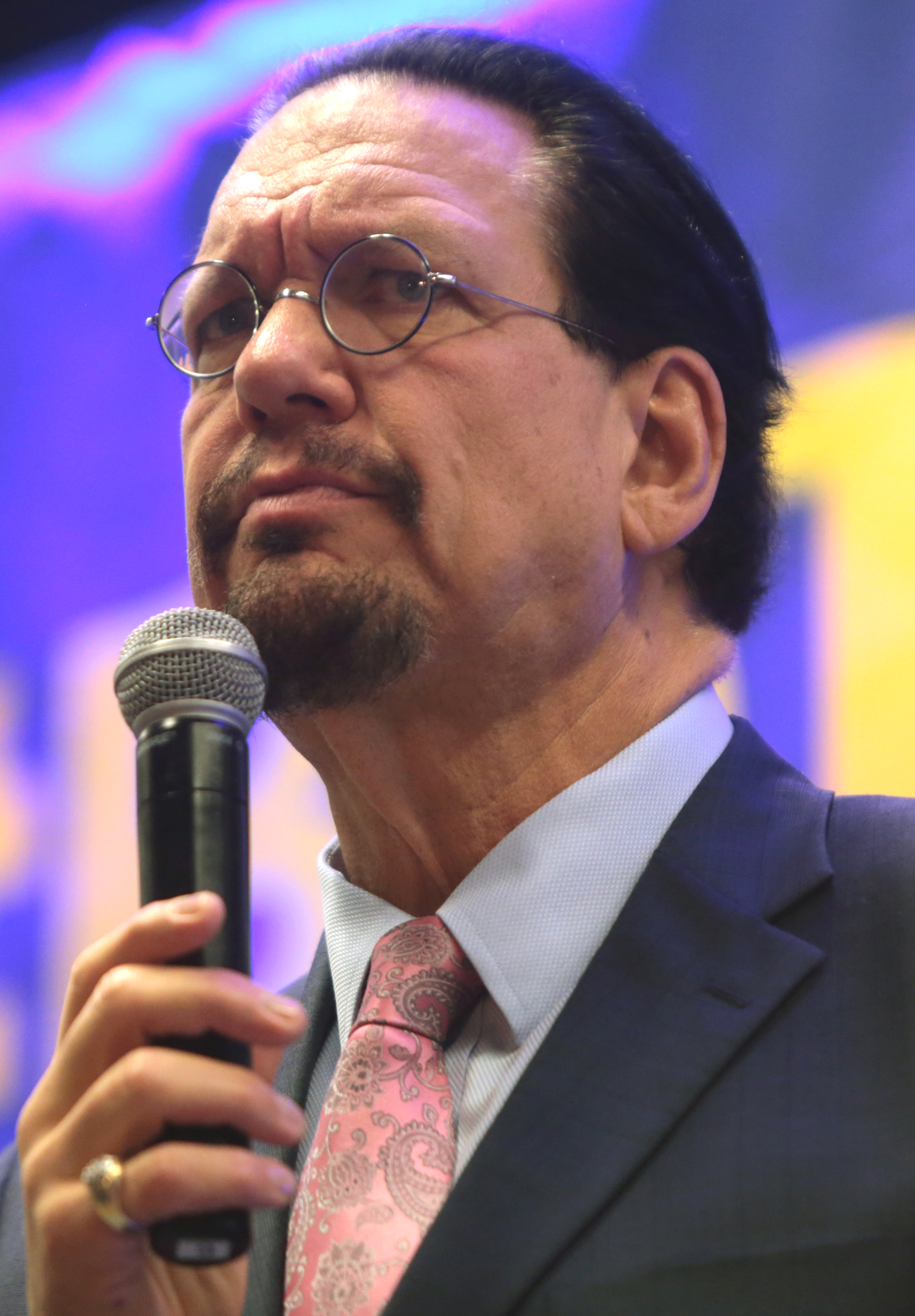
Penn Jillette

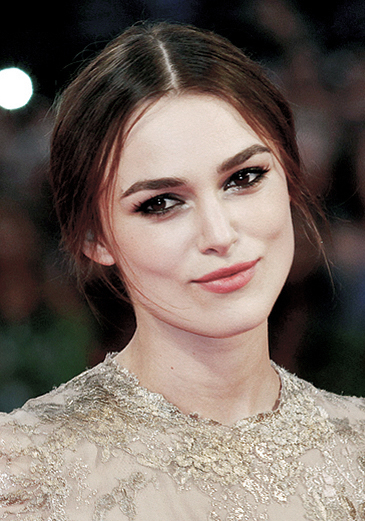
Keira Knightley

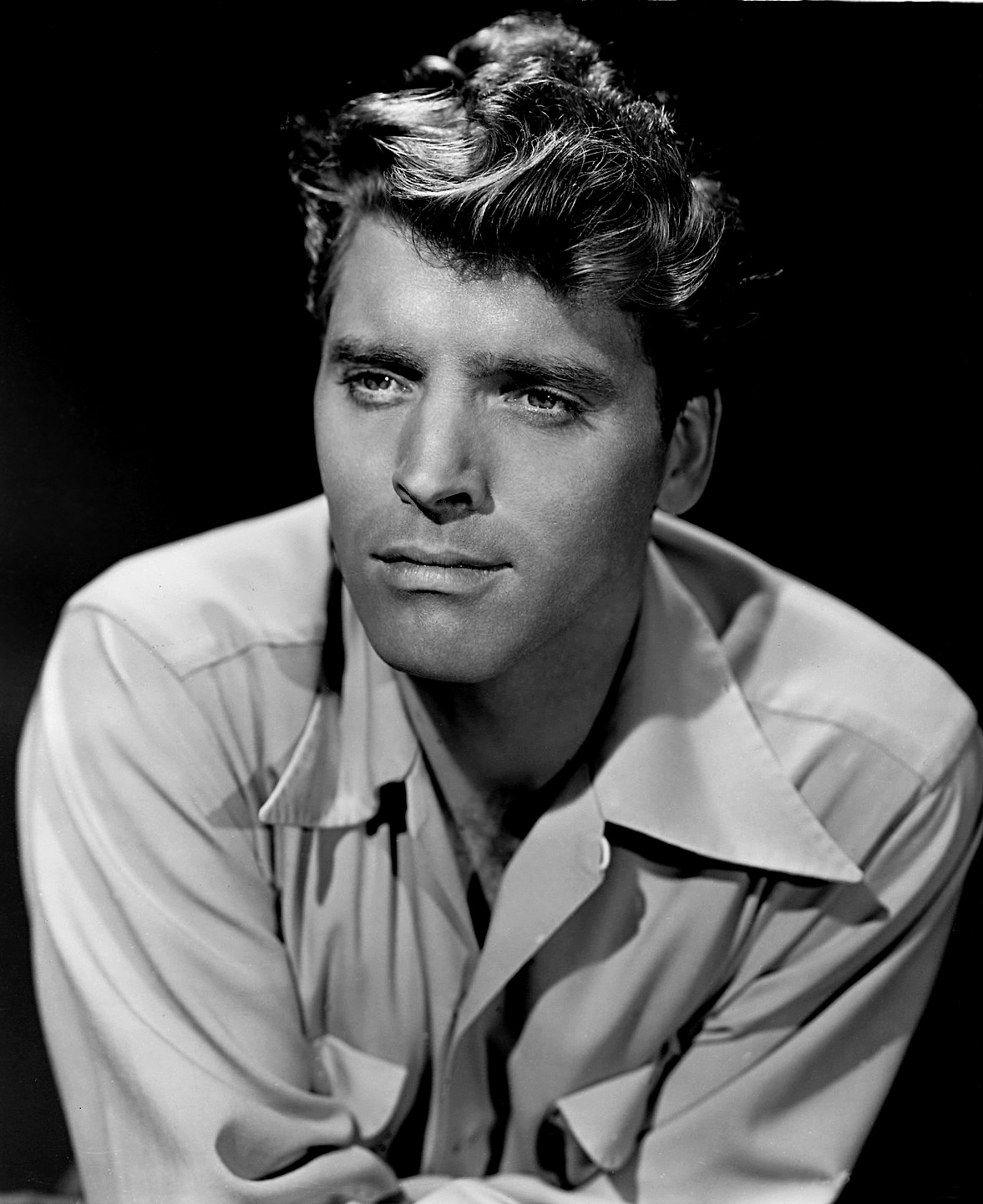
Burt Lancaster

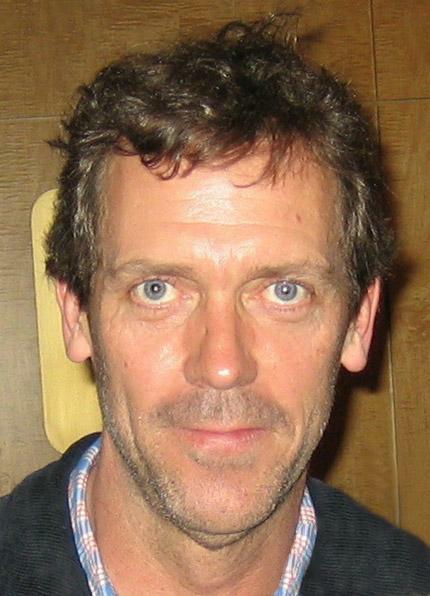
Hugh Laurie

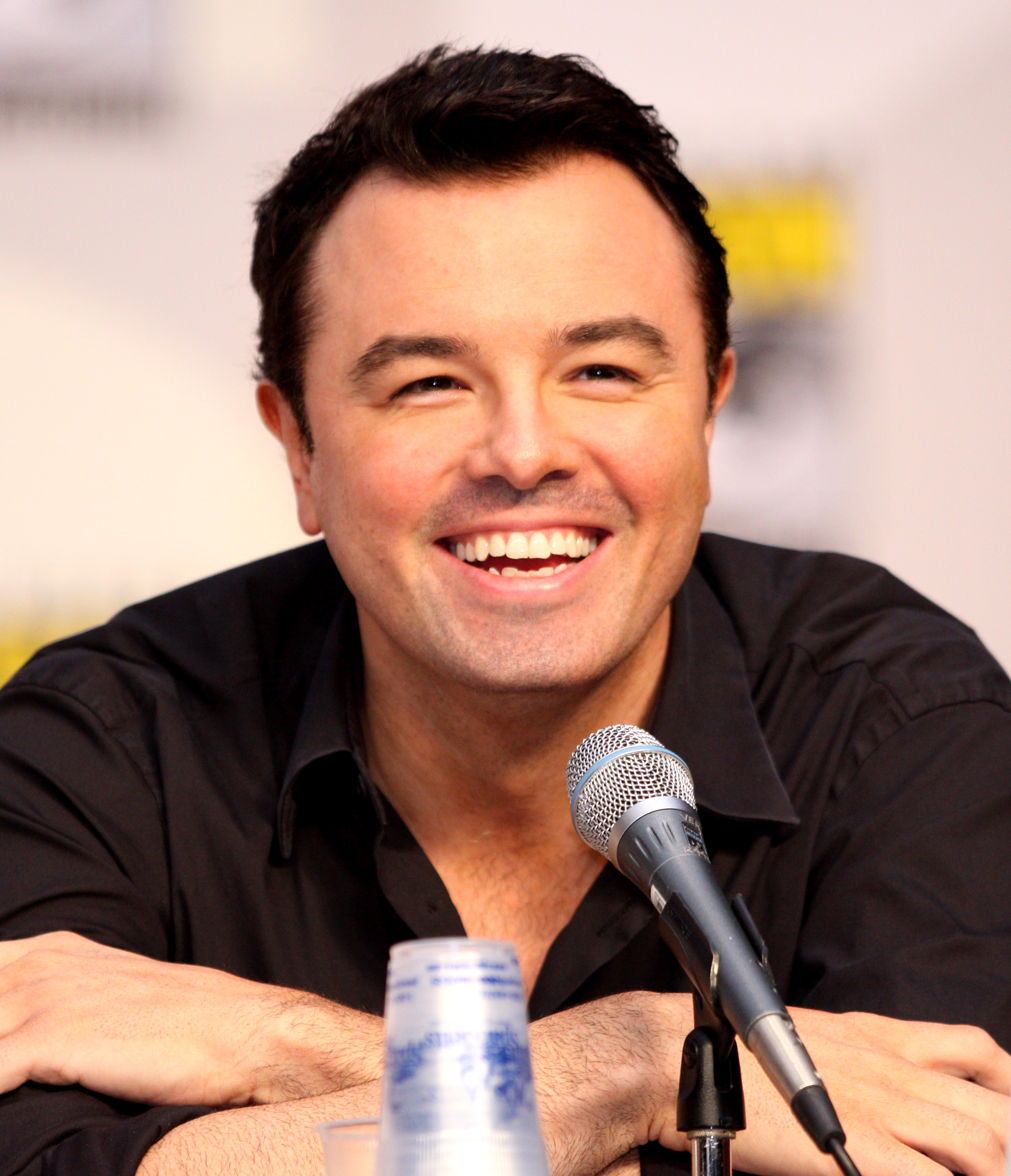
Seth MacFarlane

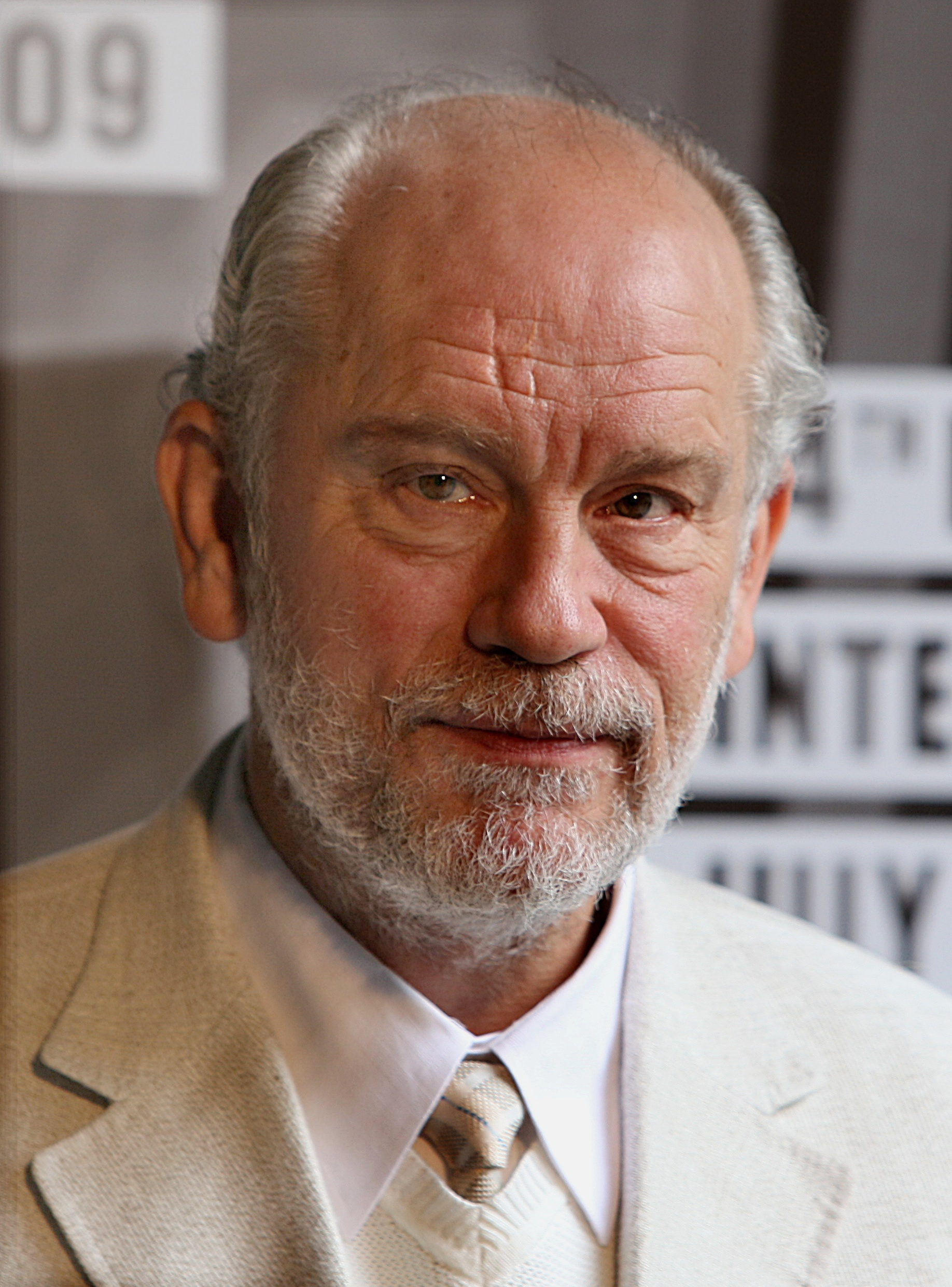
John Malkovich

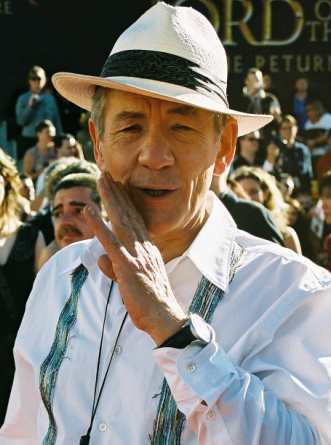
Ian McKellen

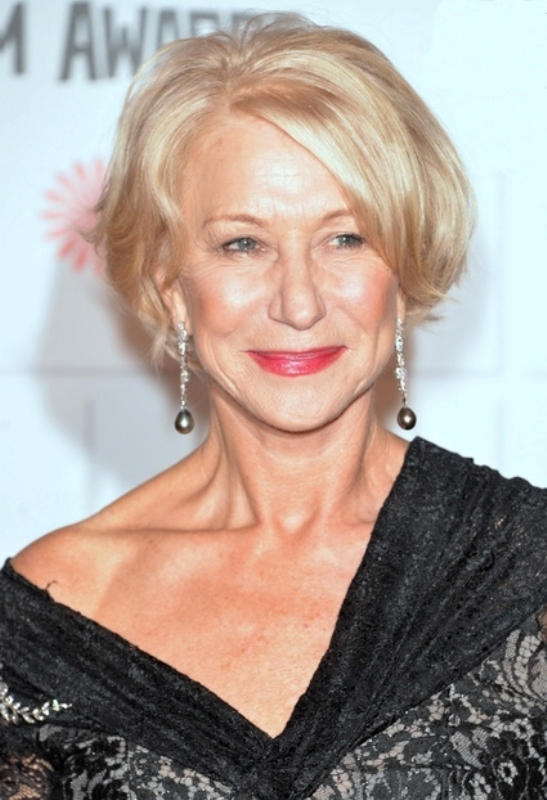
Helen Mirren

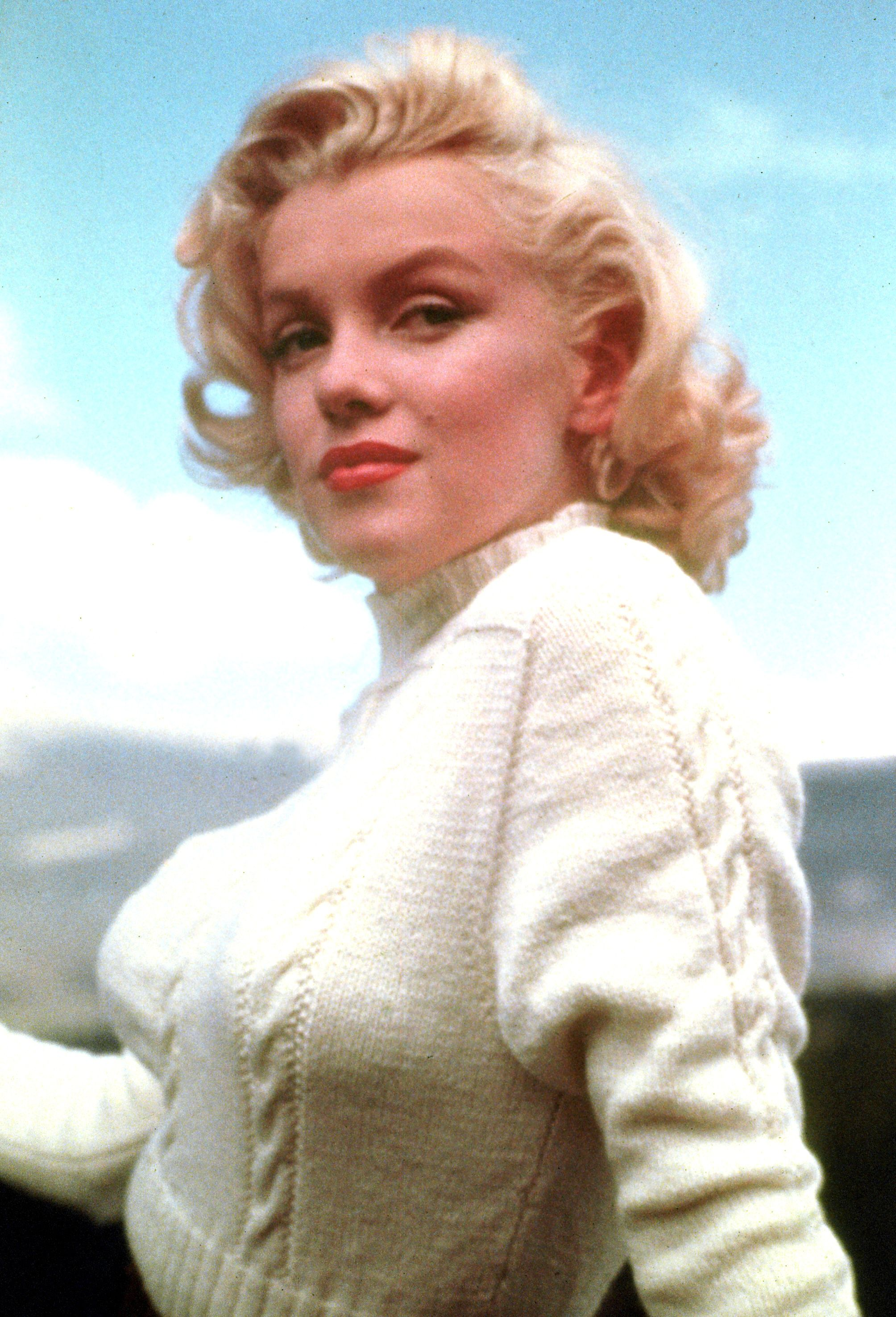
Marilyn Monroe

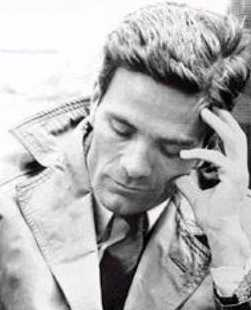
Pier Paolo Pasolini

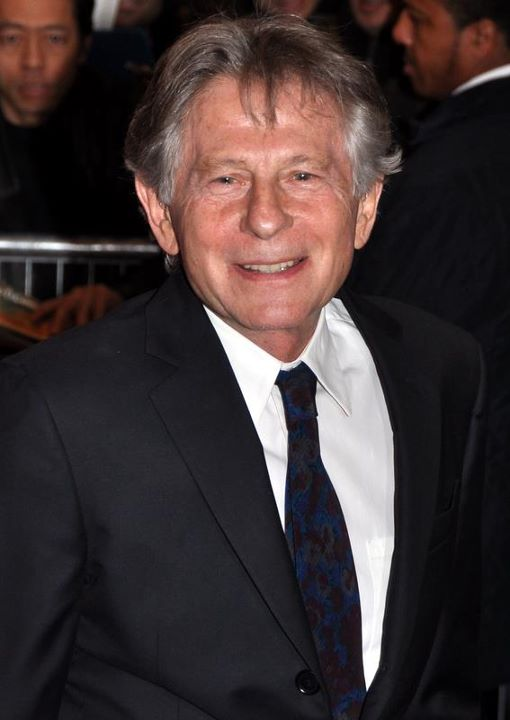
Roman Polanski

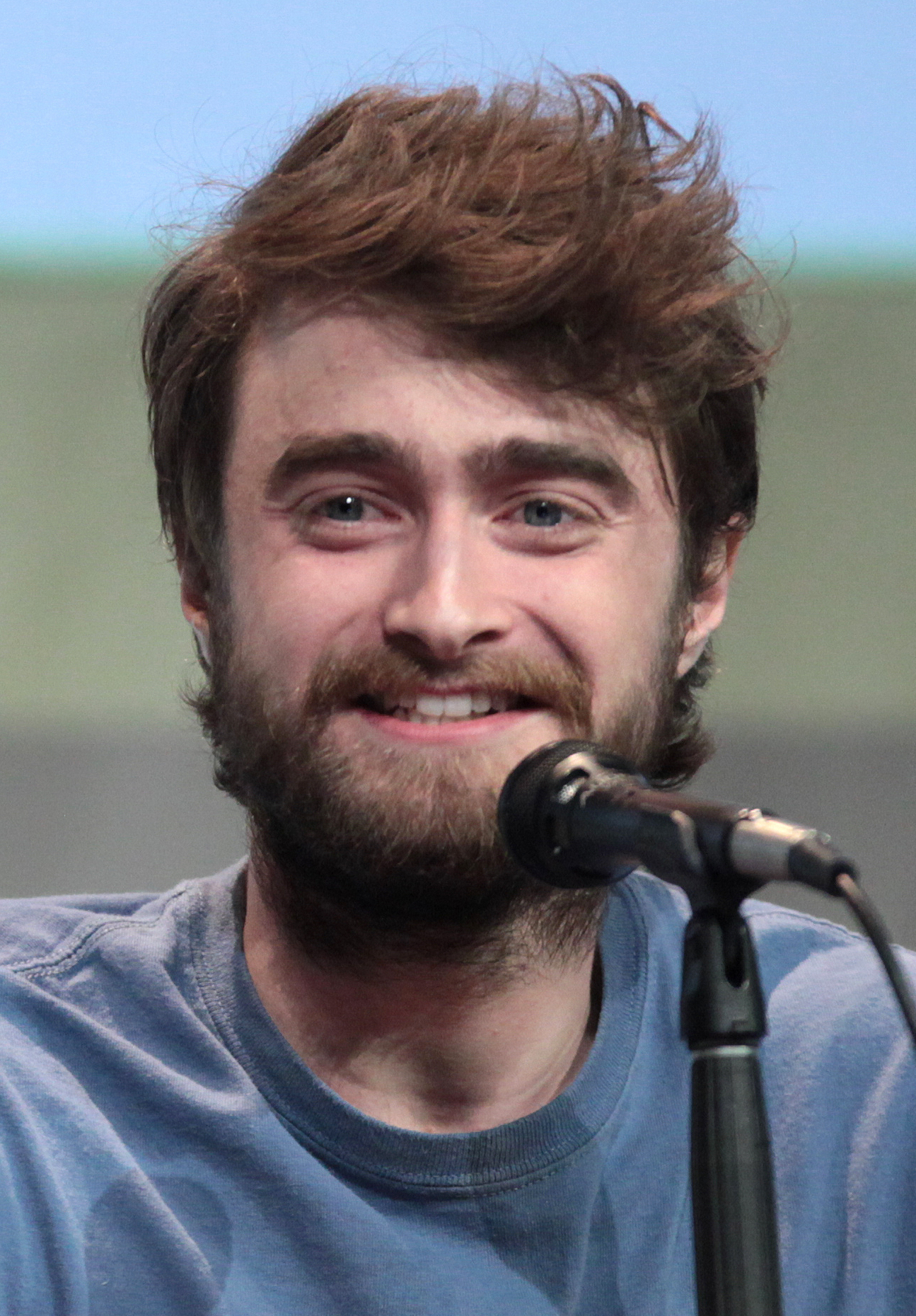
Daniel Radcliffe

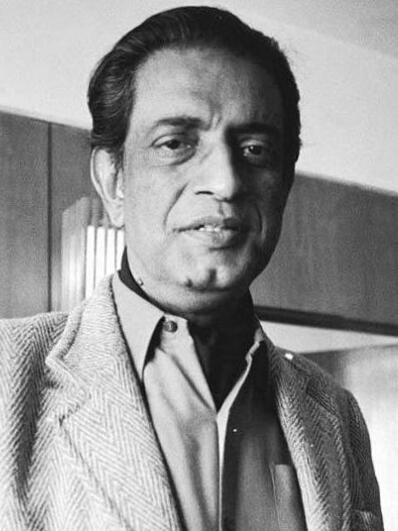
Satyajit Ray

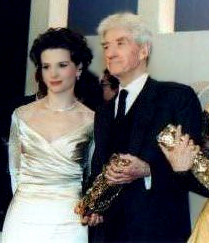
Alain Resnais

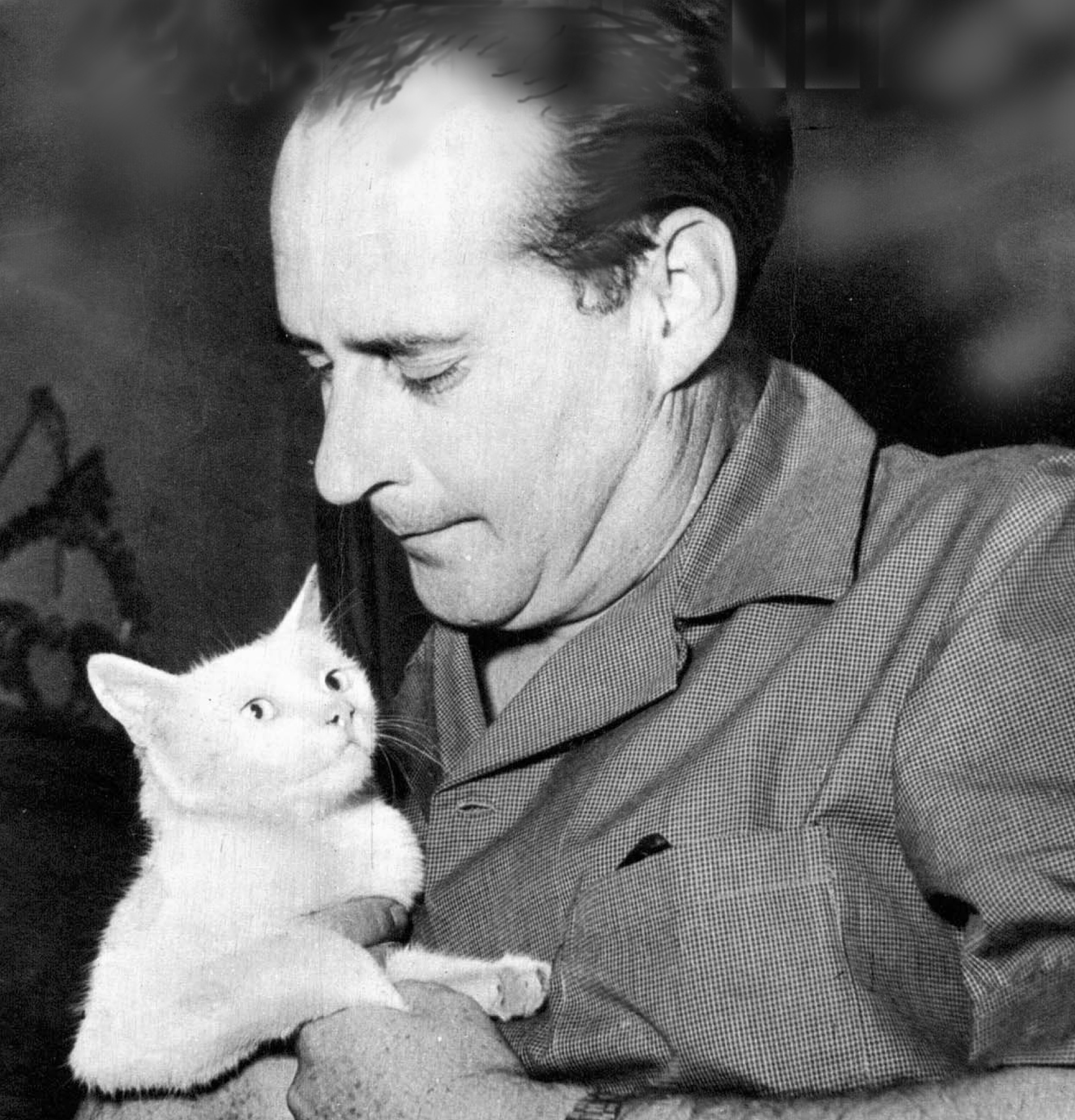
Roberto Rossellini

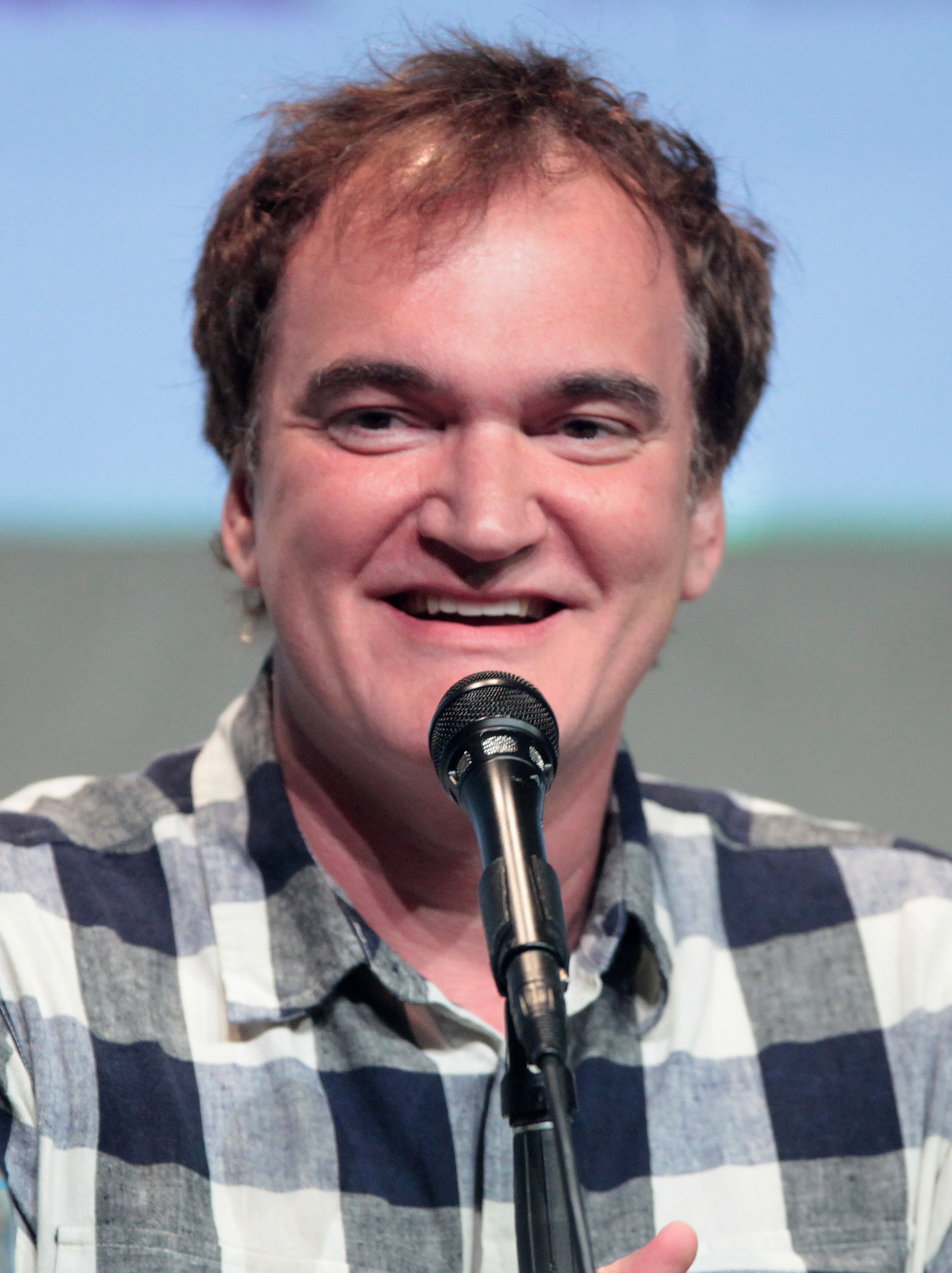
Quentin Tarantino

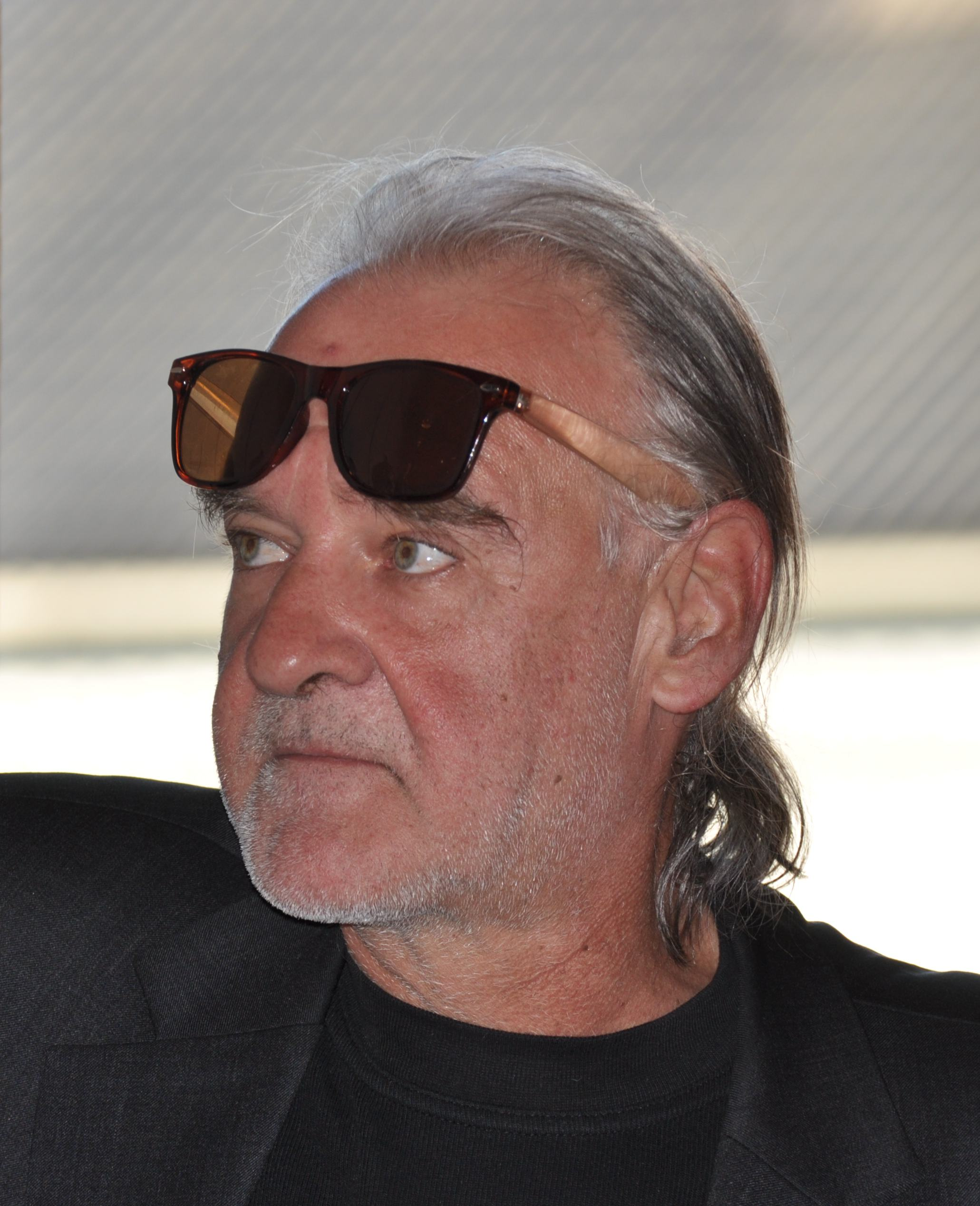
Béla Tarr

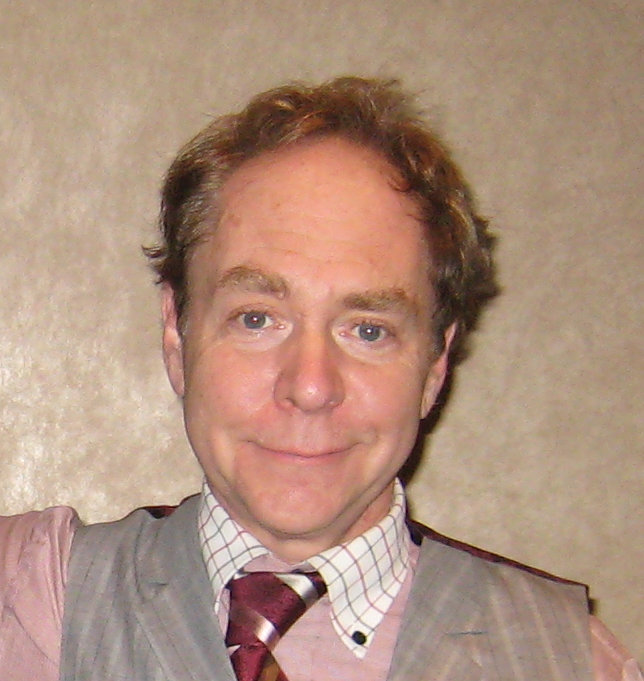
Teller

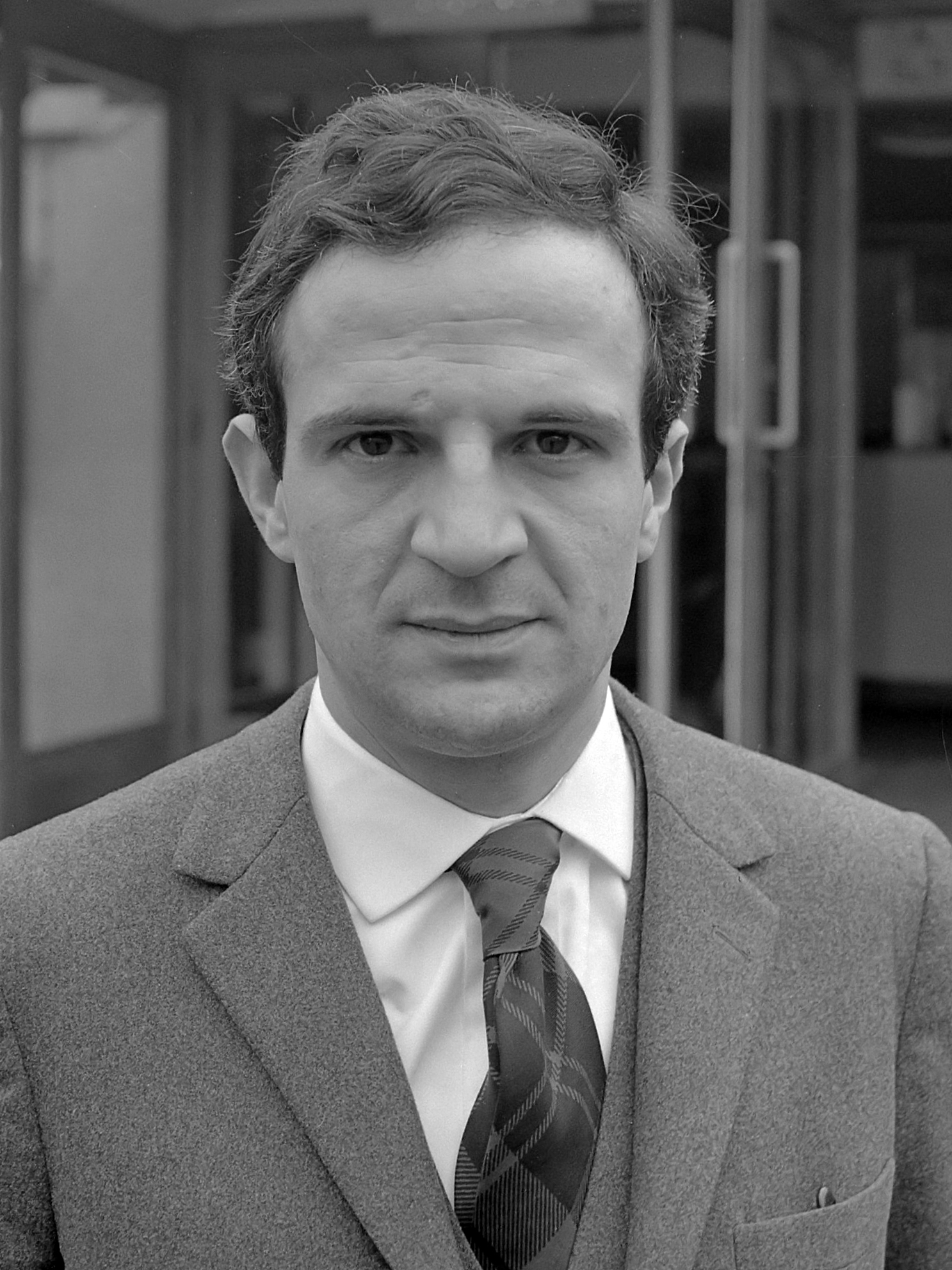
François Truffaut

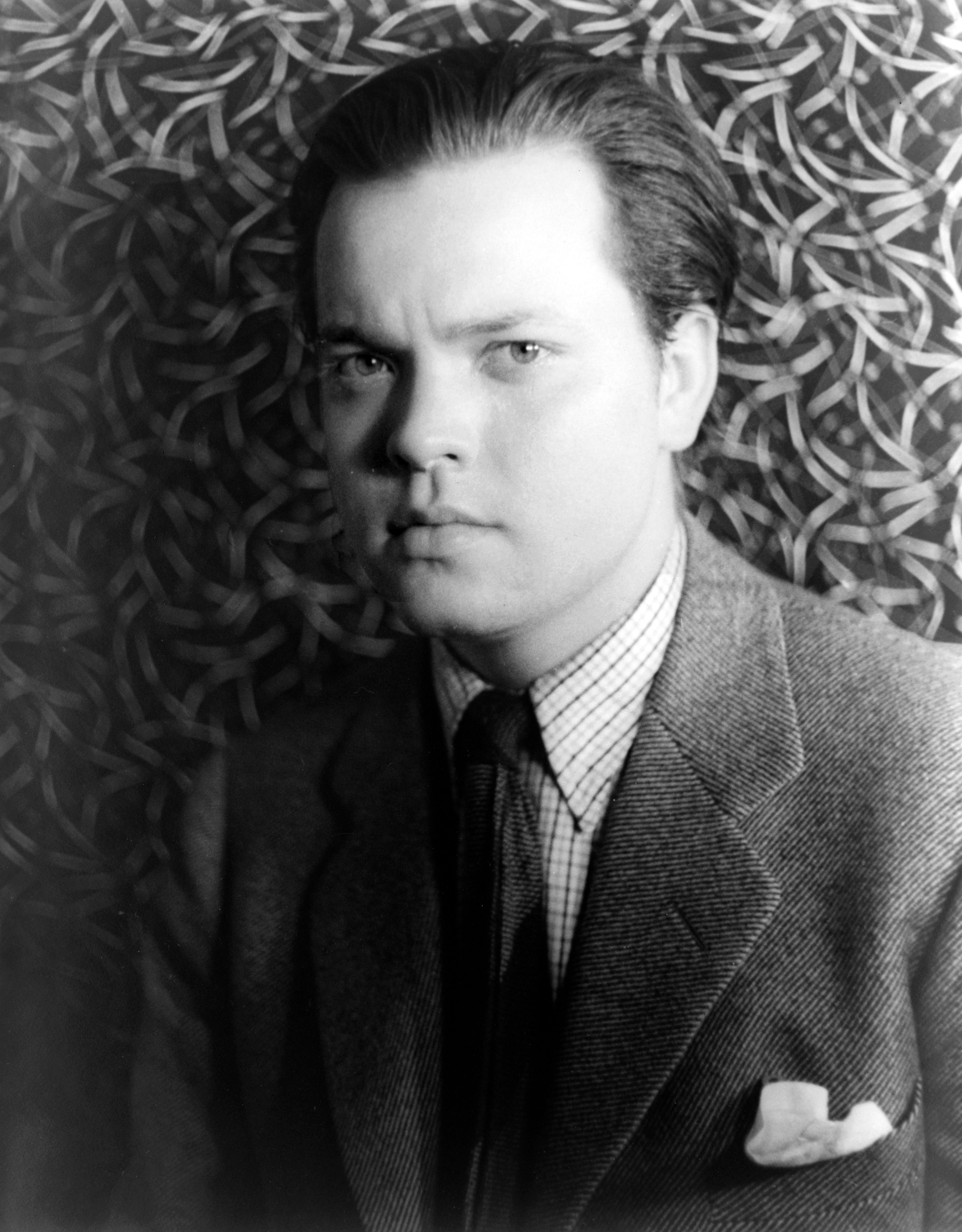
Orson Welles

- Douglas Adams (1952–2001): British radio and television writer and novelist.
- Mary Adams (1898–1984): English producer and BBC television administrator.
- Phillip Adams (born 1939): Australian broadcaster, writer, film-maker and left-wing thinker. He was the Australian Humanist of the Year in 1987.
- Adithya Menon (born 1974): Indian actor.
- Joe Ahearne (born 1963): British television screenwriter and director.
- Javed Akhtar (born 1945): Indian Screenwriter and Poet.
- Mikael Åkerfeldt (born 1974): Swedish musician, singer-songwriter, and producer.
- Keith Allen (born 1953): British comedian, actor, singer and writer.
- Woody Allen (born 1935): American film director, writer, actor, comedian, and playwright.
- Robert Altman (1925–2006): American film director.
- Alejandro Amenábar (born 1972): Spanish-Chilean film director.
- Wil Anderson (born 1974): Australian comedian, radio presenter, and television host.
- Seth Andrews (born 1968): American author and host of The Thinking Atheist radio podcast.
- Aziz Ansari (born 1983): American actor and comedian.
- Fred Armisen (born 1966): American actor, comedian.
- Michelangelo Antonioni (1912–2007): Italian modernist film director, screenwriter, editor and short story writer.
- Jane Asher (born 1946): English film and television actress.
- Kevin Bacon (born 1958): American film and theater actor.
- Joan Bakewell CBE (born 1933): English television presenter and journalist.
- Javier Bardem (born 1969): Spanish actor.
- MC Paul Barman (born 1974): American rapper.
- Pelin Batu (born 1978): Turkish actress and author.
- Andréa Beltrão (born 1963) Brazilian actress, comedian and author.
- Sarah Bernhardt (1844–1923): French stage actress. She was asked by French composer Charles Gounod if she ever prayed. Bernhardt replied "No, never. I'm an atheist". Later returned to the Roman Catholicism in which she was baptized as an infant.
- Bernardo Bertolucci (1941–2018): Italian film director and screenwriter.
- Paul Bettany (born 1971): English actor.
- Aleister Black (born 1985): Professional wrestler
- Frankie Boyle (born 1972): Scottish comedian.
- Orla Brady (born 1961): Irish actress.
- Brannon Braga (born 1965): American television producer and writer.
- Neal Brennan (born 1973): American comedian, writer, producer, and director.
- Jim Broadbent (born 1949): English theatre, film, and television actor.
- Jeremy Brock (born 1959): British actor, producer, writer, and director.
- Charlie Brooker (born 1971): British writer and satirist best known for his television show Screenwipe.
- Derren Brown (born 1971): English psychological illusionist, mentalist, and skeptic of paranormal phenomena. Professed to being an atheist in his book Tricks of the Mind and described Bertrand Russell's collection of essays Why I Am Not a Christian "an absolute joy."
- Luis Buñuel (1900–1983): Spanish film-maker, activist of the surrealist movement. Known for his one-liner, "Thank God I'm an atheist."
- Richard Burton (1925–1984): Welsh actor.
- Kari Byron (born 1974): American television host and artist.
- Peter Caffrey (1949–2008): Irish actor.
- James Cameron (born 1954): Canadian film director.
- Richard Carleton (1943–2006): Current affairs journalist.
- George Carlin (1937–2008): Actor, comedian. Speaking about God and religion in his stand-up, saying "an invisible man in the sky."
- Adam Carolla (born 1964): American comedian, actor, author, radio host, and podcaster. Regularly refers to himself as an atheist.
- Jimmy Carr (born 1972): English comedian, author, actor, and presenter of radio and television.
- Asia Carrera (born 1973): Former American pornographic actress.
- Matthew Chapman (born 1950): English journalist, screenwriter, and director.
- Jeremy Clarkson (born 1960): English journalist and broadcaster.
- Scott Clifton (born 1984): American soap opera actor.
- George Clooney (born 1961): American actor, director, producer, screenwriter.
- Billy Connolly (born 1942): Scottish comedian, actor, former musician.
- Jim Cornette (born 1961): American professional wrestling manager, commentator, promoter, and booker.
- Sir Noël Coward (1899–1973): English actor, playwright, and composer of popular music.
- Daniel Craig (born 1968): English actor, well known for playing James Bond from 2006 to 2021.
- David Cronenberg (born 1943): Canadian film director, one of the principal originators of the 'body horror' genre.
- Mackenzie Crook (born 1971): English actor and comedian.
- David Cross (born 1964): American actor, writer.
- Adrianne Curry (born 1982): American model, television host, and film actress.
- Ileana D'Cruz (born 1987): Indian-Portuguese actress
- Rodney Dangerfield (1921–2004): American comedian and actor.
- Paul Daniels (1938–2016): Magician and Entertainer
- John Davidson (born 1941): American singer, actor, and game show host.
- Larry David (born 1947): American comedian, writer, actor, director, and television producer
- Alan Davies (born 1966): English comedian, writer, and actor.
- Russell T Davies (born 1963): Welsh television producer and writer.
- Terence Davies (born 1945): English screenwriter, film director, actor, and novelist.
- William B. Davis (born 1938): Canadian actor.
- John de Lancie (born 1948): American actor, comedian, director, producer, and writer.
- Guillermo del Toro (born 1964): Mexican director and screenwriter.
- Andrew Denton (born 1960): Australian comedian and television host.
- Johnny Depp (born 1963): American actor, well known for playing Captain Jack Sparrow in Pirates of the Caribbean.
- Marlene Dietrich (1901–1992): German-born American actress, singer and entertainer.
- Phyllis Diller (1917–2012): American actress and comedienne.
- Stanley Donen (1924–2019): American film director.
- Natalie Dormer (born 1982): English film and television actress.
- Jamie Dornan (born 1982): Irish actor, model and musician.
- John Doyle (born 1953): Australian comedian, actor, and writer.
- Bruno Dumont (born 1958): French film director and screenwriter.
- Clint Eastwood (born 1930): American actor, film director, composer, and producer.
- Christopher Eccleston (born 1964): English stage, film, and television actor.
- David Edgar (born 1948): British playwright.
- Sergei Eisenstein (1898–1948): Soviet Russian film director and film theorist.
- Ben Elton (born 1959): English comedian, writer and director.
- Frances Farmer (1913–1970): American film, television, and theater actress.
- Diane Farr (born 1969): American actress.
- Harvey Fierstein (born 1952): American actor, playwright, and screenwriter.
- Brian Flemming (born 1966): American film director and playwright, notable for his 2005 film The God Who Wasn't There.
- Dave Foley (born 1963): Canadian actor.
- Peter Fonda (1940–2019): American actor.
- Sir Denis Forman (1917–2013): British director (1949–1954) and later Chair (1971–1973) of The British Film Institute, Chairman and managing director of Granada Television, and Director of the Royal Opera House in London.
- Jodie Foster (born 1962): American film actress, director, and producer.
- Nick Frost (born 1972): English actor, comedian, and writer.
- Stephen Fry (born 1957): British humourist, writer, actor, and filmmaker.
- Bob Geldof (born 1951): Irish musician, businessman and political activist.
- Ricky Gervais (born 1961): British actor, film and television director, screenwriter, producer, and comedian.
- Paul Giamatti (born 1967): American film and television actor.
- Ira Glass (born 1959): American radio personality and host of This American Life. He has stated that he is a staunch atheist.
- Theo van Gogh (1957–2004): Dutch film director, television producer, publicist, and actor, murdered following the broadcasting of his anti-Islamic film Submission.
- Bobcat Goldthwait (born 1962): American actor, comedian, screenwriter, and film and television director.
- Dan Gordon (born 1961): Northern Irish actor, director and author. Calls himself agnostic.
- Angela Gossow (born 1974): German singer-songwriter, manager, and journalist.
- Richard E. Grant (born 1957): British actor.
- Alice Greczyn (born 1986): American actor. Author of "Wayward". Founder, "Dare to Doubt" Web portal.
- Seth Green (born 1974): American actor and comedian.
- Peter Greenaway, CBE (born 1942): Welsh-born English film director.
- Kathy Griffin (born 1960): American actress and comedian.
- Shenae Grimes (born 1989): Canadian actress.
- Kamal Haasan (born 1954): Indian film actor and film director.
- Paul Haggis (born 1953): Canadian born, American citizen screenwriter and producer for consecutive Best Picture Oscar winners, Million Dollar Baby (2004) and Crash (2004), the latter of which he also directed.
- Brian Hall (1937–1997): English actor.
- Tony Hancock (1924–1968): British actor and comedian.
- Sir David Hare (born 1947): English dramatist and theatre and film director.
- Nina Hartley (born 1959): American pornographic actress, film director, author, and sex educator.
- Amber Heard (born 1986): American film and television actress.
- Hugh Hefner (1926–2017): American publisher and entrepreneur.
- Katharine Hepburn (1907–2003): American actress.
- Werner Herzog (born 1942): German film director, producer, screenwriter, actor, and opera director.
- Kenny Hotz (born 1973): Canadian comedian, filmmaker, actor, producer, director and photographer.
- John Humphrys (born 1943): Welsh journalist, author and radio and television presenter. Prefers the term agnostic.
- John Huston (1906–1987): American film director and actor.
- Jamie Hyneman (born 1956): American visual effects expert and former cohost of Mythbusters.
- Eric Idle (born 1943): British comedian.
- Eddie Izzard (born 1962): British comedian.
- Clive James AO (1939–2019): Australian expatriate author, poet, critic, memoirist, travel writer, and cultural commentator.
- Derek Jarman (1942–1994): English film director, stage designer, diarist, artist, gardener and author.
- Penn Jillette (born 1955): American magician. He has also taken the Blasphemy Challenge.
- Alejandro Jodorowsky (born 1929): Chilean-French filmmaker, playwright, actor, author, comic book writer and spiritual guru.
- Billy Joel (born 1949): American singer, musician, and composer.
- Dom Joly (born 1967): Award-winning British television comedian and journalist.
- Sarah Kane (1971–1999): English playwright.
- Skandar Keynes (born 1991): English actor.
- Rajeev Khandelwal (born 1975): Indian television actor.
- Margot Kidder (1948–2018): Canadian American film and television actress, well known for playing Lois Lane in Salkind's Superman film series.
- Larry King (1933–2021): American radio and television host.
- Michael Kinsley (born 1951): American political journalist, commentator, and television host.
- Jerzy Kawalerowicz (1922–2007): Polish film director.
- Keira Knightley (born 1985): English actress and model.
- Walter Koenig (1936-2026): American actor and screenwriter.
- Jan Kott (1914–2001): Polish theatre theoretician and critic.
- Stanley Kubrick (1928–1999): American film director, screenwriter, producer, cinematographer and editor whose films include 2001: A Space Odyssey, A Clockwork Orange and The Shining.
- Burt Lancaster (1913–1994): American film actor.
- Elsa Lanchester (1902–1986): English-born American actress. Atheism is mentioned in her autobiography.
- John Landis (born 1950): American film director.
- Fritz Lang (1890–1976): Austrian-American filmmaker, screenwriter, and occasional film producer and actor.
- Charles Laughton (1899–1962): English-born American actor. Atheism is mentioned in his wife's autobiography.
- Hugh Laurie OBE (born 1959): English actor, comedian and writer.
- Nigella Lawson (born 1960): English journalist, food writer, broadcaster, and television presenter.
- Cloris Leachman (1926–2021): American actress.
- Bruce Lee (1940–1973): martial artist, actor and philosopher. John Little states that Lee was an atheist. When asked in 1972 what his religious affiliation was, Lee replied "none whatsoever." Also in 1972, when asked if he believed in God, he responded, "To be perfectly frank, I really do not."
- Robert Lees (1912–2004): Hollywood screenwriter.
- Tom Leykis (born 1956): American radio talk-show host.
- Robert Llewellyn (born 1956): English actor, television presenter, comedian, and writer. Also a skeptic and science enthusiast, and has expressed that his major pseudoscientific irritations are astrology and climate change denial.
- Rebecca Lord (born 1973): French pornographic actress.
- Jane Lynch (born 1960): American actress and comedian.
- Kevin Macdonald (born 1967): Scottish director.
- Seth MacFarlane (born 1973): creator, animator, executive producer, actor and writer.
- Bill Maher (born 1956): American comedian, author, political satirist and television host.
- John Malkovich (born 1953): American actor, producer, and director.
- Stephen Mangan (born 1972): English actor.
- Paul Mazursky (1930–2014): American director, producer, and actor.
- Shirley Manson (born 1966): Scottish singer and musician.
- Sylvester McCoy (born 1943): Scottish actor.
- John McCririck (1940–2019): English television horse racing pundit.
- Ian McDiarmid (born 1944): Scottish theatre actor and director, well known for playing Emperor Sheev Palpatine in the Star Wars franchise.
- Sir Ian McKellen (born 1939): English stage and screen actor.
- Pauline McLynn (born 1962):Irish character actress and author.
- Butterfly McQueen (1911–1995): American actress.
- Stephen Merchant (born 1974): British actor and writer.
- George Meyer (born 1956): American television producer and writer.
- Dame Helen Mirren (born 1945): English stage, television and film actress.
- Warren Mitchell (1926–2015): English actor.
- Marilyn Monroe (1926–1962): American actress, model, and singer.
- Julianne Moore (born 1960): American actress.
- Dylan Moran (born 1971): Irish comedian.
- Dermot Morgan (1952–1998): Irish comedian and actor.
- Cillian Murphy (born 1976): Irish stage and screen actor.
- Jonathan Myerson (born 1960): British television and radio dramatist.
- Akkineni Nageswara Rao (1924–2014): Indian actor, producer, Padmavibhushan award recipient.
- Kumail Nanjiani (born 1978): Actor, writer comedian, producer. While Nanjiani was raised Muslim, he now identifies as an atheist
- Thandiwe Newton (born 1972): English actress.
- Mike Nichols (1931–2014): American television, stage and film director, writer, and producer.
- Gaspar Noé (born 1963): Argentinian-born French filmmaker.
- Dara Ó Briain (born 1972): Irish comedian and television presenter.
- Elizabeth Olsen (born 1989): American actress.
- Patton Oswalt (born 1969): American comedian and actor. In his standup special No Reason To Complain, he calls himself a "stone-cold atheist."
- Yasujirō Ozu (1903–1963): Japanese film director and script writer.
- Elliot Page (born 1987): Canadian actor.
- Sir Michael Parkinson CBE (1935–2023): English broadcaster and journalist.
- Bruce Parry (born 1969): English former Royal Marines instructor.
- Julia Pascal (born 1949): British Jewish playwright and theatre director.
- Pier Paolo Pasolini (1922–1975): Italian film director, poet, writer and intellectual.
- Simon Pegg (born 1970): English actor, comedian, writer, film producer and director.
- Sam Perrin (1901–1998): American screenwriter.
- Julia Phillips (1944–2002): film producer and author.
- Joaquin Phoenix (born 1974): American film actor.
- Michael Pitt (born 1981): American actor and musician.
- Roman Polanski (born 1933): Polish director.
- Sarah Polley (born 1979): Canadian actress and director.
- Gail Porter (born 1971): Scottish television presenter.
- Paula Poundstone (born 1959): American stand-up comedian, author, actress, interviewer, and commentator.
- Terry Pratchett (1948–2015): English author.
- CM Punk (born 1978) American professional wrestler.
- Peter Purves (born 1939): English actor and television presenter.
- Aron Ra (born 1962): American author, public speaker, and vlogger.
- Daniel Radcliffe (born 1989): English actor, well known for playing Harry Potter in the film series of the same name.
- Prakash Raj (born 1965): Indian actor, director and producer.
- S. S. Rajamouli (born 1973): Indian film director, screenwriter, and stunt choreographer
- Mani Ratnam (born 1956): Indian film director, screenwriter, and producer
- Satyajit Ray (1921–1992): Indian director, screenwriter, documentary filmmaker, author, essayist, lyricist, magazine editor, illustrator, calligrapher, and music composer.
- Carl Reiner (1922–2020): American actor, film director, producer, writer and comedian.
- Rob Reiner (1947–2025): American actor, film director, producer, and political activist
- Alain Resnais (1922–2014): French film director and screenwriter.
- Griff Rhys Jones (born 1953): Welsh comedian, writer, actor, and television presenter.
- Anna Richardson (born 1971): English presenter, television producer, writer, and journalist.
- Fyfe Robertson (1902–1987): Scottish television journalist.
- Gene Roddenberry (1921–1991): American screenwriter and producer, well known as the creator of the Star Trek franchise.
- Richard Rodgers (1902–1979): American composer.
- Seth Rollins (born 1986): American professional wrestler and actor.
- Ray Romano (born 1957): American actor, writer and stand-up comedian.
- Pascual Romero (born 1980): American musician and television producer.
- Linda Ronstadt (born 1946): American singer.
- Andy Rooney (1918–2011): Humorist, American radio and television writer.
- Roberto Rossellini (1906–1977): Italian film director and screenwriter.
- Douglas Rushkoff (born 1961): American media theorist, writer, columnist, lecturer, graphic novelist, documentarian, and outspoken critic of religion.
- Dan Savage (born 1964): American author, columnist, and podcaster.
- Alan Scarfe (1937–2024): Canadian actor, director and novelist.
- George C. Scott (1927–1999): American stage and film actor, director, and producer.
- Andy Serkis (born 1964): English actor and director.
- Elyse Sewell (born 1982): American fashion model.
- Vijay Sethupathi (born 1978): Indian actor and producer.
- Léa Seydoux (born 1985): French actress.
- Don Siegel (1912–1991): American film director and producer.
- Sarah Silverman (born 1970): American comedienne, writer and actress.
- Marc Sinden (born 1954): English theatre producer and actor.
- Tarsem Singh (born 1961): Indian-American director.
- Ian Smith (born 1938): Australian soap opera character actor and television scriptwriter.
- Matt Smith (born 1982): English actor.
- Dan Snow (born 1978): English television presenter and historian.
- Alexander Skarsgård (born 1976): Swedish actor.
- Stellan Skarsgård (born 1951): Swedish actor.
- Steven Soderbergh (born 1963): American filmmaker, director.
- Todd Solondz (born 1959): American screenwriter and independent film director.
- Britney Spears (born 1981): American singer, songwriter, and dancer.
- Doug Stanhope (born 1967): American comedian.
- David Starkey CBE (born 1945): English historian, television and radio presenter.
- Juliet Stevenson (born 1956): English actress.
- Patrick Stewart (1940–2026): English actor of stage, film and television.
- Emma Stone (born 1988): American actress and producer.
- Matt Stone (born 1971): co-creator of South Park.
- J. Michael Straczynski (born 1954): American writer and producer.
- Sir Alan Sugar (born 1947): English entrepreneur, businessman, and television personality.
- Julia Sweeney (born 1959): American actress, comedienne, and author.
- Quentin Tarantino (born 1963): American film director, screenwriter, producer, and actor.
- Béla Tarr (1955–2026): Hungarian filmmaker and screenwriter.
- Paul Taylor (1930–2018): American choreographer.
- Teller (born 1948): American magician.
- Louis Theroux (born 1970): English documentary filmmaker and broadcaster who is noted for various documentary series.
- Emma Thompson (born 1959): English actress, comedienne, and screenwriter.
- François Truffaut (1932–1984): French filmmaker and film critic.
- Tom Tykwer (born 1965): German film director.
- Brian Tyler (born 1978): American film composer
- Kenneth Tynan (1927–1980): British theatre critic and writer.
- Ram Gopal Varma (born 1962): Indian film director, writer, and film producer.
- Wynford Vaughan-Thomas CBE (1908–1987): Welsh newspaper journalist and radio and television broadcaster.
- Paul Verhoeven (born 1938): Dutch film director, screenwriter, and film producer.
- Paolo Villaggio (1932–2017): Italian actor, writer, director, and comedian.
- Sarah Vowell (born 1969): American author, broadcaster, and voice actor.
- Joss Whedon (born 1964): American screenwriter and director.
- Lalla Ward (born 1951): English actress and illustrator.
- Orson Welles (1915–1985): American actor, director, writer, and producer.
- Wil Wheaton (born 1972): American actor, blogger, and writer
- Peter White (born 1947): English broadcast journalist and DJ.
- Alissa White-Gluz (born 1985): Canadian singer and songwriter.
- Robyn Williams (born 1944): Australian science journalist and broadcaster.
- Ted Willis (1914–1992): British television dramatist, also politically active in support of the Labour Party.
- Terry Wogan KBE DL (1938–2016): Irish radio and television broadcaster.
