= Keythe Farley =

American actor

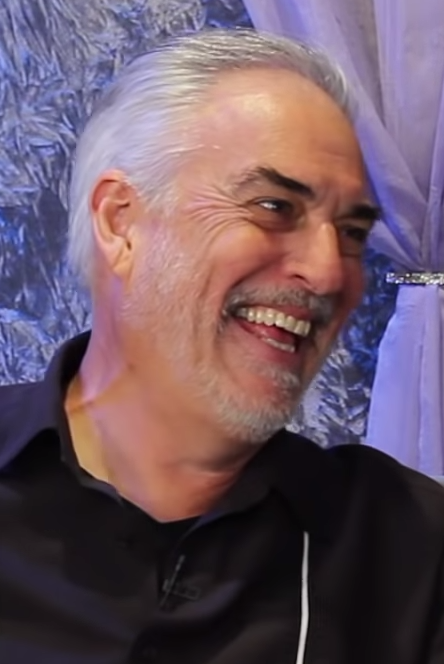
- Farley in 2018
- Occupation: Actor
- Years active: 1988–present
- Spouse: Ann Closs
- Children: 2

Keythe Farley is an American actor.

Farley is a graduate of UCLA and is an active member of The Actors' Gang and Evidence Room theatre companies. He has written, produced or voice-directed episodes of Rugrats, As Told by Ginger and The Wild Thornberries for Klasky Csupo.

Farley is also the co-author, with Brian Flemming and Laurence O'Keefe, of Bat Boy: The Musical, which was the recipient of the 2001 Outer Critics Circle and Lucille Lortel Awards for Best Off-Broadway Musical.

== Filmography ==
=== Animated roles ===
- Aaahh!!! Real Monsters - Blib
- Duckman - Ninja #3
- Rugrats - Radio Announcer
- The Legend of Korra - Captain, Dai Li Agent
- Winx Club: Beyond Believix - King Neptune
- Alien Xmas - Santa

=== Animated film roles ===
- Barbie: Dreamtopia - Strawberry Bear #1
- Bilal: A New Breed of Hero - Additional voices

=== Film roles ===
- And the Band Played On - Lab Technician
- California Myth - Rick
- Dog Tags - Mark Dessau
- Hang Your Dog in the Wind
- Nothing So Strange - Keith Charles
- Private Obsession - New York Photographer

=== Shorts ===
- Rockwall - Gus

=== TV series roles ===
- Beverly Hills, 90210 - Jules
- Dead Last - Dick Dudley
- Full House - Waiter, Max Dobson
- Gabriel's Fire - Adam Bryce
- Sisters - Director
- Star Trek: Voyager - Vidiian #2
- The Boys Are Back - David
- The Naked Truth - Waiter

=== Video game roles ===
- Call of Duty: Black Ops III - Additional voices
- Chocobo GP - Leviathan
- Date Everything - Artt
- Dishonored 2 - Guard
- Fallout 4 - Conrad Kellogg, Y9-15, X9-27
- Fallout 76: Steel Dawn - Initiate Vernon Dodge
- Generator Rex: Agent of Providence - Surge
- God of War II - Door Guy, Soldier
- Granblue Fantasy: Relink - Zathba
- Guild Wars 2 - Beigarth
- Guild Wars 2: Heart of Thorns - Beigarth
- Horizon: Forbidden West - Studious Vuadis
- Judgment - Masamichi Shintani
- Like a Dragon: Infinite Wealth - Additional voices
- Like a Dragon Gaiden: The Man Who Erased His Name - Agent Saigo
- Like a Dragon: Pirate Yakuza in Hawaii - Additional voices
- Lightning Returns: Final Fantasy XIII - Additional voices
- Mass Effect 2 - Thane Krios, Fortack, Additional voices
- Mass Effect 3 - Thane Krios
- Red Dead Redemption 2 - The Local Pedestrian Population
- Resistance 3 - Jonathan Rose, Anson, Patrick
- Rise of the Tomb Raider - Additional voices
- Rugrats in Paris: The Movie - Jean Claude, Reptar Robot, Robosnail, Ninja
- Skylanders: Giants - Eruptor
- Skylanders: Imaginators - Eruptor, Wildfire, Weeruptor
- Skylanders: Swap Force - Eruptor
- Skylanders: SuperChargers - Eruptor, Wildfire, Weeruptor
- Skylanders: Trap Team - Wild Fire, Eruptor, Weeruptor, Sleep Dragon
- Star Wars: Squadrons - Ardo Barodai
- Starhawk - Rifters
- Tactics Ogre: Reborn - Balxephon V. Rahms
- Voodoo Detective - Gordon Crumbsford
- Where the Water Tastes Like Wine - Narrator
- The Legend of Heroes: Trails Through Daybreak - Ellroy Harwood
- The Legend of Heroes: Trails Through Daybreak II - Ellroy Harwood

== Crew work ==
- Adventure Time - Voice director
- Agatha Christie: And Then There Were None - Voice director
- As Told by Ginger - Voice director
- Cyberpunk 2077 - Voice director
- Final Fantasy XV - Voice director
- God Hand - Voice director, voice-over casting
- God of War - Voice director
- God of War II - Voice director
- God of War III - Voice director, voice-over casting
- God of War: Chains of Olympus - Voice director
- Lair - Voice director
- Marvel: Ultimate Alliance 2 - Voice director
- Rugrats - Voice director
- Rugrats in Paris: The Movie - Voice director
- Syphon Filter: Logan's Shadow - Voice director
- Transformers: The Game - Voice director
