= Slumdance Film Festival =

1997 film festival in Utah

The Slumdance film festival was a film festival held in Park City, Utah in January 1997 by founder Brian Flemming in a converted Mrs. Fields cookie factory on Main Street.

== History ==
Slumdance was formed after Flemming's film Hang Your Dog in the Wind was rejected by Sundance Film Festival. Slumdance showed seven features and several shorts. Besides two screening rooms, there was a Build Your Own Festival option that used videocassettes and VCRs. Slumdance was set up like a slum, and had a mission area that served free soup, a "Tent City" which was decorated like hobo housing. The converted Slumdance space was 6000 square feet in total. A total of 150 submissions were entered by opening night, and made a press release that stated "Slumdance Stuns Movie World by Existing".

The event garnered some media attention, and the parties attracted celebrities including Tim Robbins. A brief interview followed on the Sundance Channel and included what the Deseret News called "uncomfortable comments" directed at Sundance mogul Robert Redford. An internet based site calling itself the "Slumdance Historical Preservation Society" confirmed that Slumdance would not occur the following year. An online-only festival was held in 2000.
