= Hang Your Dog in the Wind =

1997 film by Brian Flemming

- Screenshot
- Directed by: Brian Flemming
- Written by: Brian Flemming
- Produced by: Stann Nakazono
- Starring: Steve Wilcox; Dave James; Keythe Farley
- Cinematography: Brett Webster
- Edited by: Jacob Craycroft
- Release date: 1997
- Country: United States
- Language: English

Hang Your Dog in the Wind is a 1997 American film. The first feature film of Brian Flemming, it was shot in black and white and Super 16 in 1993 then blown up to 35mm. Although it was not accepted by either the Sundance Film Festival or the Slamdance Film Festival in 1997, it was released as part of film festival created by Flemming and associates, "The 1997 Slumdance Experience."

== See also ==
- Brian Flemming
- The God Who Wasn't There
