= Nothing So Strange =

- Directed by: Brian Flemming
- Written by: Brian Flemming (uncredited)
- Produced by: Brian Flemming
- Starring: David James; Mark Daniel Cade; Keythe Farley
- Music by: No War But The Class War
- Production companies: GMD Studios; Parallax Productions; Unsharp Mask
- Release date: January 13, 2002 (Slamdance Film Festival)
- Running time: 82 minutes
- Country: United States
- Language: English
- Budget: $200,000

Nothing So Strange is a 2002 American mockumentary film written, produced, and directed by Brian Flemming in the style of an "independent documentary". It centers on the fictional assassination of Microsoft founder Bill Gates on December 2, 1999. The film won the New York Times Claiborne Pell Award for Original Vision at the Newport Film Festival and received a positive reception from Variety.

== Plot ==
At the very beginning of the film, Bill Gates (played by Gates double Steve Sires) walks onto the stage of the pavilion in MacArthur Park, Los Angeles, California on Thursday, December 2, 1999, to give a check for one million dollars to "Literacy For Life" as part of the "Bill Gates Foundation." (The filmmakers intentionally avoided mentioning Gates' family members in the film; thus, they refrain from naming the Bill & Melinda Gates Foundation.) Upon reaching the stage, Gates is shot dead by a sniper, first in the right shoulder, then the head.

While chasing after the unknown sniper through an abandoned building, a rookie police officer fatally shoots Alek J. Hidell (a known alias of JFK killer Lee Harvey Oswald), a minor anti-establishment figure and minority, in the head. Hiddell is named as the assassin of Gates, a report to this effect is filed by district attorney Gil Garcetti, and the case is closed.

Beyond this point, which occurs before the opening credits are finished, Gates does not reappear and is mentioned only as a wealthy, successful man and the subject of the assassination being investigated. The word "Microsoft" barely makes an appearance in the film, and Gates is portrayed as a well-liked and missed public figure; a very passing mention is made of the existence of anti-Gates sentiment.

However, a group of people dissatisfied with the official version of events organizes into the activist group Citizens for Truth, and sets out to examine the available evidence of the assassination. The organization uncovers numerous details that create reasonable doubt as to the guilt of Hiddell in the assassination, and the possibility that the real assassin is still at large.

The mockumentary follows the organization as they grow in numbers, political prominence, and progress in their investigative efforts. The organization's success reaches a climax at their first annual convention, which is followed by their rapid drop in credibility and visibility to become effectively irrelevant.

== Cast ==
- Laurie Pike as Debra Meagher
- David James as David James
- Mark Daniel Cade as Mark Anderson
- Keythe Farley as Keith Charles
- Douglas Glazer as Dan Rivera
- Valerie Gordon as Valerie
- Etana Jacobson as Etana
- Jennifer Lauren as Jennifer Smith
- Steve Sires as Bill Gates
- Sarah Stanley as Julia Serrano
- Philip Anthony Traylor as Alek Hidell
- Steve Wilcox as Steve Martinez
- Didi Williams as himself

== Production ==
Flemming was inspired to make a film about a contemporary assassination that grabbed the public attention after wondering what would happen if a Kennedy-style assassination happened during modern times. Through his research on the Kennedy assassination, he became convinced that there was no conspiracy. Flemming himself has no animosity toward Bill Gates, and used many Microsoft products during the making of Nothing So Strange.

Very little of the film was scripted. Flemming has said that he wrote no script, providing perhaps a few important lines, and instead putting the creative effort into the details of the props and artifacts of the story. The "Garcetti Report" on the assassination, for example, is a complete document written by Flemming. The actors improvised most of their own dialogue, interactions, and reflections, and to some extent aiming the direction of the story along with their organization, with minor daily cues from Flemming. Most of the actors had no prior professional acting experience.

Another technique is what Flemming has termed "reality-hacking"; the interaction of the actors in character with the real world. A scene taking place on the protest stage of the 2000 Democratic National Convention was filmed at the real convention, and Flemming crashed a real police commission hearing.

Flemming open sourced all seventy hours of footage he shot, allowing other people to make their own cut.

== Release ==
Prior to release of the film, Flemming registered and developed realistic web pages for a number of the subjects in the film.

Nothing So Strange premiered on January 13, 2002, at the Slamdance Film Festival. After having trouble attracting distributors, Flemming decided to self-distribute the film. It was released on DVD on December 19, 2004.

== Reception ==
Scott Foundas of Variety called it "a smart, aware, polemical work". Doug Brunell of Film Threat rated it 4/5 stars and called it "brilliantly subversive". The Austin Chronicle wrote, "The result is a genre-bending experience that lives up to Daniel Webster's quote: 'There is nothing so powerful as truth, and often nothing so strange.'" Jason Bovberg of DVD Talk rated it 3/5 stars and wrote, "Nothing So Strange isn't quite the alternate-reality puzzle box that it aspires to be. It has an undeniably unique premise, but it quickly devolves into the mundane."

Bill Gates himself stated, "It is very disappointing that a moviemaker would do something like this."

It won the New York Times Claiborne Pell Award for Original Vision.
