= Rational Response Squad =

Atheist organization

- Logo
- Formation: 2006
- Type: Atheist activist group
- Region served: Global
- Website: www.rationalresponders.com

The Rational Response Squad (RRS) is an atheist activist group that confronts what it considers to be irrational claims made by theists, particularly Christians. The most visible member of RRS is co-founder Brian Sapient. The Rational Response Squad, along with the filmmaker Brian Flemming, made headlines in December 2006 with their Blasphemy Challenge.

== The Blasphemy Challenge ==
The Blasphemy Challenge, started in December 2006, is an Internet-based project which aims to get atheists to come out and declare themselves as atheists. The challenge asks atheists to submit videos to the website YouTube, in which they record themselves blaspheming or denying the existence of the Holy Spirit. According to the RRS' interpretation of several passages of the Bible (specifically, Mark 3:28-29, Matthew 12:30-32 and Luke 12:10), this action is considered an unforgivable sin. Thus, users who took the challenge saw themselves as crossing a point of no return to prove that they truly did not believe in the biblical God and would "accept the consequences" if after their death they find that the Christian form of the Abrahamic God does exist. The first 1,001 users who took the challenge received a DVD of Flemming's documentary film The God Who Wasn't There. Magician Penn Jillette, author Christopher Hitchens, philosopher Daniel Dennett, and Raëlism founder Raël participated in the project. It was also the first YouTube video of comedian and Internet personality Pat Condell.

== YouTube controversies ==
The Rational Response Squad's YouTube account was suspended on March 23, 2007, but was later reinstated. The suspension was prompted by Uri Geller's statement that the RRS had infringed his copyright when posting a video featuring him.

On May 7, 2007, Geller's company, Explorologist, filed a copyright lawsuit against Brian Sapient of the Rational Response Squad. On May 8, 2007, the Electronic Frontier Foundation filed suit against Uri Geller on behalf of Sapient "asking for damages due to Geller's violation of the DMCA, a declaratory judgment that the NOVA video does not infringe Geller's copyrights, and that Geller be restrained from bringing any further legal action against Sapient in connection to the clip." The case was dismissed by Chief Judge Walker in February 2008, due to "lack of subject matter and personal jurisdiction."

In August 2008 a settlement was reached and "[a]s part of the legal settlement, Explorologist[Geller] has agreed to license the disputed footage under a non-commercial Creative Commons license, preempting future legal battles over the fair use of the material. A monetary settlement was also reached."

On September 16, 2007, Wired magazine reported that "YouTube had banned a group called the Rational Response Squad (RRS) after it complained its videos were being taken down due to spurious DMCA requests from" someone working on behalf of the Creation Science Evangelism ministry. It further noted that while this highlights problems with DMCA, the ministry's own website said that "none of the materials ... are copyrighted, so feel free to copy these and distribute them freely." The account was restored on September 18, 2007.

== Debate with The Way of the Master ==
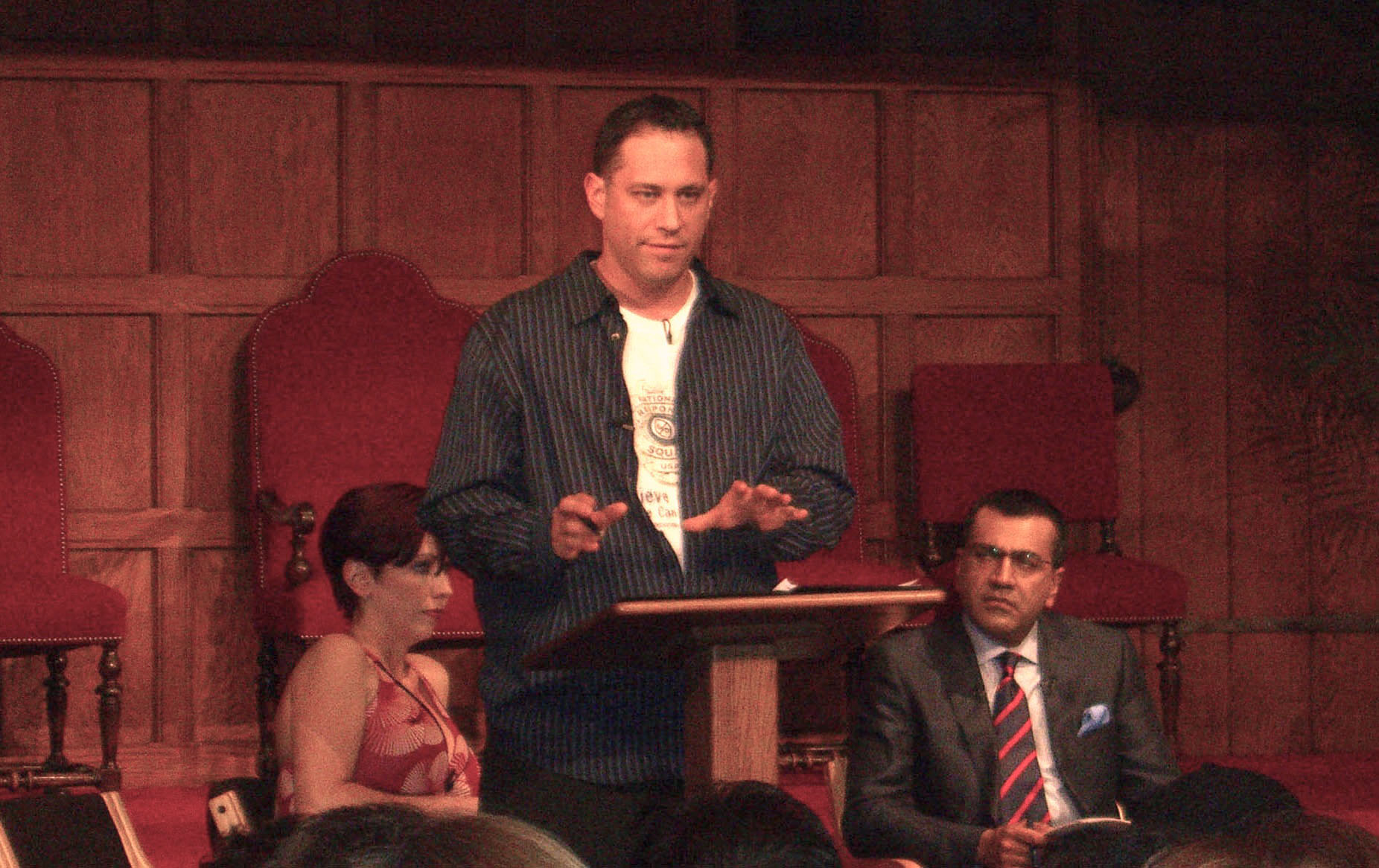
Brian Sapient, speaking at the debate at Calvary Baptist Church, May 5, 2007. Seated behind him is RRS' Kelly O'Connor and Nightline anchor Martin Bashir, acting as moderator.

Brian Sapient and Kelly O'Connor, members of the RRS, participated in a debate with representatives from The Way of the Master, actor and evangelical Christian Kirk Cameron, and his colleague Ray Comfort, at Calvary Baptist Church in Manhattan on May 5, 2007. Nightline aired the debate online and included a short two-segment summary on its May 9 broadcast. At issue was the existence of God. Nightline correspondent Martin Bashir served as moderator at the event.

Cameron and Comfort challenged the Rational Response Squad to the debate. They claimed that they could prove the existence of God scientifically without using the Bible, though Comfort does refer to the Bible when he participates in such discussions, and did so during the May 5 debate. In a May 8, 2007, clarification, Comfort stated that he would cease using the qualifier "without mentioning faith or the Bible" from his claims to avoid misunderstandings.

During the debate, both sides employed and responded to arguments for God's existence, including the cosmological argument and Pascal's Wager. The debate also entered topics outside of science, including history, and the question of connections between religion and morality.
