= The God Who Wasn't There =

2005 film by Brian Flemming

- Directed by: Brian Flemming
- Written by: Brian Flemming
- Produced by: Brian Flemming; Amanda Jackson
- Starring: Brian Flemming (narration); Sam Harris; Richard Carrier; Alan Dundes; Barbara Mikkelson; David P. Mikkelson; Robert M. Price; Scott Butcher; Ronald Sipus
- Distributed by: Beyond Belief Media; Microcinema International
- Release date: May 21, 2005
- Running time: 62 mins
- Language: English

The God Who Wasn't There is a 2005 independent documentary written and directed by Brian Flemming. The documentary questions the existence of Jesus, examining evidence that supports the Christ myth theory against the existence of a historical Jesus, as well as other aspects of Christianity.

== Overview ==
=== Christ myth theory ===
Most of the film is a presentation of the argument for the Christ myth theory. Flemming and those he interviews in the film make these claims:

- The history of Christianity, especially the doctrine of the earliest Christians, is consistent with Jesus having been a mythical character, with historical details only added on later.
- The Pauline epistles, which were written before the Gospels, show no awareness on the part of the author that Jesus had recently lived. Paul mentions only the crucifixion, the resurrection, and the ascension, presenting them occurring in a mythic realm rather than an earthly one.
- The death-resurrection-ascension sequence was common in earlier mythologies and religions, suggesting that the Jesus character was inspired by similar forebears, divorced from any tangible experience on Earth.
- Other details of the Jesus biography offered in the Gospels have precedent in earlier writings of Judaism: for example, the Massacre of the Innocents appears directly inspired by a nearly identical story in the Book of Exodus.

=== Other criticisms of Christianity ===
Besides defending the Jesus myth hypothesis, the film criticizes some other aspects of Christianity:

- Flemming argues that moderate Christianity makes even less sense than a fundamentalist interpretation of Christian doctrine, asserting that the Bible contains many messages incompatible with toleration of non-Christians who reject Jesus as the Savior of Christian doctrine and must therefore be regarded by Christians as damned.
- Flemming sees God's demand that people believe in him or be damned as essentially mind control. He interprets Mark 3:29 and similar passages as damning anyone who doubts the existence of the Holy Spirit. He is appalled by the notion that Jesus will forgive murder, theft, and any other sin but not this type of disbelief.
- Because Jesus knows people's innermost thoughts, and that therefore one must police one's thoughts to avoid any doubt, Flemming summarizes this idea with the statement that the greatest sin in fundamentalist Christianity is "to think."
- Flemming asserts that Christians have historically been obsessed with blood sacrifice, and illustrates this viewpoint by pointing out that Mel Gibson's 2004 film The Passion of the Christ, which contains very few scenes that do not feature graphic violence or suffering, was more financially successful than any previous film about Jesus.
- The film references poll results indicating that 44% of Americans believe, to some degree, that Jesus will come back to Earth in their lifetime, and that this sort of thinking is not conducive to long-term governmental policies.

== Interviews and commentary ==
Several notable personalities make appearances in the documentary:

- Scott Butcher is the creator of the Rapture Letters.com website.
- Richard Carrier is an atheist activist and scholarly writer on the Christ Myth Theory, who holds a PhD in ancient history from Columbia University.
- Alan Dundes was an anthropologist and folklorist. Until his death shortly after being interviewed for the documentary, he was Professor of Folklore and Anthropology at the University of California, Berkeley.
- Sam Harris neuroscientist, philosopher, and author of The End of Faith, Letter to a Christian Nation, and The Moral Landscape.
- Barbara Mikkelson and David P. Mikkelson are the founders of Snopes.com.
- Robert M. Price is Professor of Biblical Criticism at the Council for Secular Humanism's Center for Inquiry Institute.
- Ronald Sipus, principal of Village Christian School, which Brian Flemming attended as a youth. Sipus walked out of the interview, accusing Flemming of misrepresenting himself and his reasons for the interview.

The following only appear on the DVD's commentary track:

- Richard Dawkins is an evolutionary biologist and science writer who has argued for atheism, such as in his book The God Delusion.
- Earl Doherty is a contemporary advocate of the Jesus Myth theory and author of The Jesus Puzzle.
- The Raving Theist is a lawyer and former atheist blogger, who has since converted to Christianity.

Among the Christians shown in the film were attendees at a Billy Graham Crusade event at the Rose Bowl in Pasadena, California on November 18, 2004.

== Reception ==
=== Critical reviews ===
A reviewer for Impose Magazine wrote that the film "poses some serious questions" and said, "if nothing else, this film should be recognized as an important addition to the study of Gibson's masterwork. Film scholars should take note. This is an idiosyncratic film that weaves the arc of Flemming's transition from a religious life to a non-religious life into the larger questions surrounding the dilemma of a 'belief in God.' It's a bold undertaking and he pulls it off."

Jason Buchanan, in a New York Times review summary, thought that the documentary "attempts to do for religion what Morgan Spurlock's Super Size Me did for the fast-food industry" with a "bold quest to seek answers to the difficult questions that few are willing to pose... From the ignorance of many contemporary Christians as to the origin of their religion to the striking similarities between Jesus Christ and the deities worshipped by ancient pagan cults and the Christian obsession with blood and violence, this faith-shaking documentary explores the many mysteries of the Christian faith as never before."

=== Responses and controversy ===
In Christian Communications Worldwide Susan Verstraete offers four criticisms of Brian Flemming's arguments.

First, the comparison of Galileo's difficulties with the Catholic Church with arguments about the existence of Jesus are a non sequitur. "[I]t’s like saying that because your dentist isn’t an expert on small engine repair, your family doctor probably can’t diagnose chickenpox."

Second, to assert that "Christianity" is responsible for things like the "Spanish Inquisition, Charles Manson, David Koresh and other unbalanced, psychotic people who claimed to be doing God’s will" is a hasty generalization— "an inference about all Christians on the basis of a poorly selected sample."

Third, Flemming exaggerates the gap between the traditional date of Jesus' death and the composition of the Gospels, and picks and chooses elements from various mythologies to "prove that Jesus was a compilation of 'dying and rising god' myths."

Fourth, she says that Flemming argues "Paul never believed that Jesus was a physical human being" because he "never quotes Jesus or talks about Jesus’ early life." In reply she says "Paul’s letters are not meant to introduce Christ to a new audience, and so understandably don’t reiterate the stories of the Gospels," and in addition she cites verses from the Epistles that do reference the humanity of Jesus.

== Blasphemy Challenge ==
In December 2006, the atheist organization Rational Response Squad announced it would give free DVDs of the film to the first 1,001 people who participated in the Blasphemy Challenge, an Internet-based project encouraging atheists to declare themselves publicly.

== See also ==
- Jesus Camp
- Jesus Christ in comparative mythology
- Marjoe
- Religulous
