= Brian Flemming =

American dramatist

- Born: 1966 or 1967 (age 59–60)
- Occupations: film director, playwright, activist
- Known for: Bat Boy: The Musical, Nothing So Strange, The God Who Wasn't There, Blasphemy Challenge

Brian Flemming is an American film director, playwright and activist. His films include Hang Your Dog in the Wind, Nothing So Strange, and The God Who Wasn't There. His musicals include Bat Boy: The Musical, which won the LA Weekly Theater Award, Lucille Lortel Award, and Outer Critics Circle Award. He advocates for the free-culture movement and is an outspoken atheist.

== Early career ==
Flemming's first feature film was the low-budget Hang Your Dog in the Wind. Partly to promote his film, Flemming co-founded a punk film festival in Park City, Utah, called the Slumdance Film Festival, a pun on the name of the Slamdance Film Festival (which in turn referred to the Sundance Film Festival).

Slumdance brought Flemming to the attention of John Pierson, who later hired Flemming to work as a director and segment producer for Pierson's Independent Film Channel magazine-style show called Split Screen.

== Bat Boy ==
After Slumdance, Flemming turned his attention from indie film to theater with Bat Boy: The Musical. The stage musical is based on a story about a half-bat half-boy from the tabloid Weekly World News. Flemming co-wrote Bat Boy with Keythe Farley and Laurence O'Keefe. The musical grew from a Los Angeles theater to winning the LA Weekly Theater Award for Musical of the Year Award for 1999, plus four Ovation Award nominations and six Drama-Logue Awards.

Bat Boy: The Musical made its way to a New York production in March 2001, for which the play won the Lucille Lortel Award for Best Musical, the Outer Critics Circle Award for Best Musical Off-Broadway, and six Drama Desk nominations. The New Yorker described Bat Boy as a "giggling cult hit". The New York Times wrote, "It is astonishing what intelligent wit can accomplish". The musical ran in New York through December 2001.

== Nothing So Strange ==
Flemming released a faux documentary about the assassination of Bill Gates called Nothing So Strange. Bill Gates said through a spokesman that it was "very disappointing that a movie maker would do something like this". Nothing So Strange debuted at the 2002 Sundance Film Festival. Variety called it, "a crackling good movie... [that] may be the ideal prototype film for the digital age". The film won the Claiborne Pell New York Times Award for Original Vision at the 2002 Newport Film Festival.

On 24 October 2003 the film had a simultaneous debut in theaters and as an Internet download. It was released on DVD in December 2004.

== The God Who Wasn't There ==
In 2005, Flemming released his third feature-length film, the documentary The God Who Wasn't There. Through interviews with biblical and folklore scholars, Flemming investigates the evidence for the existence of Jesus, concluding that it is highly improbable that the Christian savior ever actually lived. He then discusses the beliefs of conservative Christian fundamentalists, Christian moderates (who, he states, simply enable the fundamentalists), and returns to confront the principal of the fundamentalist Christian school he attended as a child. Flemming launched three media campaigns to support his documentary: War on Christmas, War on Easter, and Blasphemy Challenge. The Blasphemy Challenge was the most successful of the three publicity stunts, gaining coverage by Newsweek, NBC News, Fox News and many other media outlets, and participation by Penn Jillette.

== Activism ==
In addition to working in film and theater, Flemming is an activist on copyright issues. He has released Nothing So Strange as an open source project, which means all of the raw footage that makes up the film is released without copyright restrictions for anyone to use. The final cut of the film, however, remains protected by copyright.

Flemming founded the organization Free Cinema, which encourages feature filmmakers to create films under two rules:

1. No money may be spent on the production, and
2. The film must be released under a copyleft license.

Flemming claims that filmmaking can now be "as inexpensive as writing novels" and that the copylefting practice is a way for new artists to gain notice and distribution in a marketplace dominated by large corporations. Free Cinema was inspired by the Free Software Movement, which is guided by similar principles of freedom. Flemming is also the owner and operator of Fair Use Press, which distributes e-books critical of public figures such as Bill O'Reilly and Arnold Schwarzenegger for their stance on intellectual property law.

During the 2007 Slamdance Film Festival, Flemming, who had been invited to sit on the festival's documentary jury, saw a demo of the video game Super Columbine Massacre RPG! and hearing about it having its nomination pulled by the festival's founder, convinced fellow jurors to award it a "Special Jury Prize" for Best Documentary (an unofficial award not endorsed by the festival). The festival's founder, Peter Baxter, later told Flemming that legal considerations prevented SCMRPG from receiving the award.
