= Skylanders: Imaginators =

2016 video game

- Developer: Toys for Bob
- Publisher: Activision
- Designer: Toby Schadt
- Programmer: Avery Lodato
- Artists: Terry Falls; Lee Harker
- Writer: Alex Ness
- Composer: Lorne Balfe
- Series: Skylanders
- Engine: Vicarious Visions Alchemy
- Platforms: Nintendo Switch; PlayStation 3; PlayStation 4; Wii U; Xbox 360; Xbox One
- Release: PS3, PS4, Wii U, Xbox 360, Xbox One: AU: October 13, 2016; EU: October 14, 2016; NA: October 16, 2016; Switch: WW: March 3, 2017
- Genres: role-playing, platform
- Modes: Single-player, multiplayer

Skylanders: Imaginators is a 2016 toys-to-life platform video game developed by Toys for Bob and published by Activision. It is the sixth installment of the Skylanders series, a successor to Skylanders: SuperChargers, and was released for Nintendo Switch, PlayStation 3, PlayStation 4, Wii U, Xbox 360 and Xbox One. It allows players to create their own characters, known as Imaginators. The game received generally positive reviews, but its sales were below Activision's expectations. It is the sixth and most recent Skylanders game released on consoles, as the franchise went into hiatus after its release.

== Plot ==
In the past, the Ancients used Mind Magic to create anything they could imagine. However, one of the Ancients, known as Brain, tried to use Mind Magic to brainwash all of Skylands, so the Ancients sealed him away along with the power of Mind Magic to prevent evil from using it.

Following the events of the last game, there has been an era of peace. However, a mysterious being steals a book from the Skylanders Academy and is revealed to work for Kaos, who seeks to use the power of Mind Magic to create an army of Doomlanders and conquer Skylands. To this end, he teams up with Brain, the last remaining Ancient, and they decide to brainwash Skylands, leaving only Spyro immune because he is a dragon. They are able to free Skylands and fight Kaos in a final battle, during which he transforms into a more powerful form and summons various Doomlanders to aid him. However, Brain betrays him and fights alongside the player. When Kaos is defeated, Brain tries to flee, but instead works alongside the Skylanders under the threat of being sealed away again and shrinks Kaos and Glumshanks.

== Gameplay ==
Similar to its predecessors, the core gameplay of Imaginators revolves around solving puzzles, platforming, and fighting enemies. Being a toys-to-life game, players can put a figurine onto a Portal of Power, which allows them to control the represented character in-game. It also features Creation Clash, a remake of Skystones, which was introduced in Giants. The game supports local multiplayer.

The game introduces "Imaginators", which are characters created by the player that can be shared with other players. At the beginning of the game, players can select a battle class (Knight, Smasher, Sentinel, Swashbuckler, Brawler, Sorcerer, Quickshot, Ninja, Bazooker, and Bowslinger) and elemental class, which determines their fighting style. While the battle class cannot be reset within the game itself, unofficial methods exist to do so using older games on the Wii and Nintendo 3DS. Afterwards, players can customize the names, voices, fighting abilities, appearances, colors, and sizes of their Imaginators. The game also features the option to automatically generates an Imaginator randomly or use existing Skylanders featured in its predecessors. Imaginators created can be shared to other players. Body parts, which are classified into four types, Common, Rare, Epic, and Ultimate, can be found during exploration and used to customize the Imaginators, which can be modified at any time. Imaginators are stored in Creation Crystals, through which players can use their Imaginators on other video game consoles. In addition to Imaginators, the game also adds 31 typical Skylanders. These include "Senseis", powerful Skylanders who are refined in their respective classes. 11 of them are villains who had appeared in previous Skylanders games. They also have the ability to perform a special attack called "Sky Chi". These Senseis lead the Imaginators, and involve in helping them to unlock their abilities, techniques, weapons, and level-cap.

Crash Bandicoot and Doctor Neo Cortex appear as guest characters with their own level, Thumpin' Wumpa Islands, which has features present in previous Crash Bandicoot games. The Skylanders based on Donkey Kong and Bowser from the Mario franchise can be used as playable characters in the Nintendo console versions of the game, consistent with the game's predecessor.

== Development ==
Development of the game began after completion of Skylanders: Trap Team, with a development cycle of approximately two years. With SuperChargers not being a commercial success, and Disney's decision to shut down its own toys-to-life developer Avalanche Software and its franchise, Disney Infinity, Activision, which had grossed $3 billion with the franchise, remained hopeful and believed that the genre still has potential for continuous game development. As the game's target audience is kids, many development team members suggested ideas to their own children to see whether they resonate with them, and pitched these ideas to other members to see whether their children are equally interested in order to ensure that these gameplay ideas appeal to them.

According to Jeff Poffenbarger, the senior executive producer of Imaginators, innovation is one of the most important aspects while designing the game. They hoped that with new mechanics and systems, they can continue to attract new customers to play the game, as well as retaining the core players. In addition, according to CEO Eric Hirshberg, one of the advantages is that Skylanders, unlike its competitors, features largely original characters and would not be confined to any limitation. The Imaginators mechanic was the most significant introduction, and was designed to be similar to other complex role-playing games. However, one of the key principles is to retain its accessibility. They hoped that players can make use of their creativity to create unique Skylanders, and that the team "can’t wait to see what people create". This mechanic was inspired by a fan letter after the release of Skylanders: Spyro's Adventure. Selected player-created Imaginators had been printed out through 3D printers by the Skylanders team. As this creation mechanic introduced many new characters, the team decided to create a story that puts a huge emphasis on existing characters, so that these characters would remain relevant to the franchise.

In February 2016, Activision confirmed that there would be a new Skylanders title set to be released in 2016. The game was officially revealed on June 1, 2016. Imaginators was released for PlayStation 3, PlayStation 4, Wii U, Xbox 360 and Xbox One in October 2016. The team opted not to port the game for mobile platforms as the team realized that there is not a huge demand or market for toys-to-life games in these platforms. The developers have also decided not to make a Wii or 3DS version, unlike in previous titles, possibly due to this particular game's technical limitations. A Dark Edition, which costs more than the standard edition, was released alongside the game. It adds several cosmetic designs to the Senseis, and added three more Creation Crystals. A digital Starter's Pack would not return, as the team thought that physical toys should be a key part of the game.

In June 2016, Sony Interactive Entertainment revealed that Crash Bandicoot would be a new guest character in the game. His level and character include designs created by veteran Skylanders developer, Vicarious Visions. To create an accurate version of Crash, the team studied old documents of the old games, including the original concepts. As Crash has his own physical figure, the team went through multiple design iterations to ensure that they had successfully captured his personality, and that its final pose and appearance are cohesive with his old version. The team began animating Crash after finishing up the model, with the goal of ensuring that Crash's "edginess, trademark wackiness, and swagger" are preserved. To capture Crash's legacy, the team specifically created a new life system, spin attack mechanic for it, and numerous crates for the level based on his setting. Imaginators marked the first major appearance of Crash in several years; though he had a cameo appearance in Uncharted 4: A Thief's End, the last game in which he was the main character was 2010's Crash Bandicoot Nitro Kart 2. In August 2016, at Gamescom, it was announced the game would also feature Crash Bandicoot series antagonist Doctor Neo Cortex as a playable character, along with an additional level featuring gameplay and design elements derived from the Crash series.

Following the Nintendo Switch Presentation on January 13, 2017, Activision announced that Skylanders: Imaginators would be released on the console as a launch title. Due to the Nintendo Switch version not supporting previous Portals of Power, the version would not support Traps and Vehicles introduced to Skylanders: Trap Team and Skylanders: SuperChargers respectively (although the Vehicles can still be scanned to unlock one free Imaginite Chest each).

== Reception ==
Reception

Aggregate score
Aggregator	Score
Metacritic	XONE: 78/100; PS4: 79/100; WIIU: 77/100; NS: 72/100

Review scores
Publication	Score
Destructoid	8/10
Game Informer	7/10
GameSpot	7/10
GamesRadar+	4/5
Hardcore Gamer	PS4: 4.5/5; NS: 4/5
IGN	6.8/10
Nintendo Life	WIIU: 8/10; NS: 8/10
Nintendo World Report	WIIU: 7.5/10; NS: 7/10
Push Square	7/10
Shacknews	6/10

Skylanders: Imaginators received "generally favorable" reviews for most platforms according to review aggregator website Metacritic; the Nintendo Switch version received "mixed or average" reviews. Despite the generally positive reception, the game sold only 66,000 copies during its launch month.
