= Stacey Sher =

American film producer

- Born: November 30, 1962 (age 63); New York City, U.S.
- Occupation: Film producer
- Spouse: Kerry Brown (m. 2001)
- Children: 2

Stacey Sher (born November 30, 1962) is an American film producer.

== Early life and education ==
Sher was born to a Jewish family in New York City and raised in Fort Lauderdale, Florida. She attended the University of Southern California, where she was involved with the Peter Stark Producing Program, a two-year (four-semester) full-time graduate program designed to prepare students for careers as producers. She earned an MFA from the Peter Stark Producing Program at the University of Southern California School of Cinematic Arts.

== Career ==
In 1985, Sher became director of development at Hill/Obst Productions. In 1987, she became Vice President of Production and in 1991, she became Senior Vice President at Lynda Obst Productions. She went on to work with Danny DeVito and Michael Shamberg at Jersey Films, and now operates Double Feature Films with Michael Shamberg, with whom she co-founded the company. Some of the movies that Sher has worked on as a producer include Django Unchained, the Hateful Eight, and Pulp Fiction. Sher also worked on the 2005 Independent Spirit Award-winning Garden State, and three films with director Steven Soderbergh: Contagion, Erin Brockovich, and Out of Sight. Additional credits include Oliver Stone's World Trade Center, Matilda, and Along Came Polly. Her production company is Shiny Penny Productions.

Sher has worked with many actors and producers, including several projects with Danny DeVito. Sher and DeVito have produced movies together and the television shows Reno 911! and Kate Brasher. They also both served as executive producers on The American Embassy, UC: Undercover, and Garden State.

Sher dated director Quentin Tarantino, but their relationship ended during the development of Pulp Fiction, on which Sher was a producer.

In 2015, Sher was named co-president of Activision Blizzard Studios. which is devoted to creating television and films based on the company's library of intellectual properties, including Activision Publishing Call of Duty and Skylanders. In June 2021, Sher signed an overall deal with FX Productions. In 2026, she signed an overall deal with MGM Television.

Sher is a member of the Producers Guild of America, and the Academy of Television Arts & Sciences. She was also honored by the ACLU for her work in films and television.

== Personal life ==
She is married to music producer Kerry P. Brown. They have two children.

== Filmography ==
Producer unless otherwise noted.

=== Film ===
Year	Film	Credit
1988	Heartbreak Hotel	Associate producer
1991	The Fisher King	Associate producer
1994	Reality Bites	Executive producer
1994	Pulp Fiction	Executive producer
1995	Get Shorty	
1996	Matilda	
1996	Feeling Minnesota	
1997	Gattaca	
1998	Out of Sight	
1998	Living Out Loud	
1999	Man on the Moon	
2000	Drowning Mona	Executive producer
2000	Erin Brockovich	
2001	The Caveman's Valentine	
2001	How High	
2001	Vanilla Sky	Actress- role: Rayna
2003	Camp	
2004	Along Came Polly	
2004	Garden State	Executive producer
2005	Be Cool	
2005	The Skeleton Key	
2006	World Trade Center	
2007	Freedom Writers	
2007	Reno 911!: Miami	
2010	Extraordinary Measures	
2011	Contagion	
2012	LOL	
2012	Django Unchained	
2013	Runner Runner	
2014	Wish I Was Here	
2014	A Walk Among the Tombstones	
2015	Freeheld	
2015	Burnt	
2015	The Hateful Eight	
2016	Get a Job	
2021	Respect	
2023	Poolman	
2024	Heretic	
2026	Verity	

Thanks

Year	Film	Role
1987	Adventures in Babysitting	Thank you
1992	Reservoir Dogs	Special thanks
1996	Hard Eight	Special thanks
2002	The Good Girl	Special thanks
2003	Kill Bill: Volume 1	Special thanks
2004	Kill Bill: Volume 2	Special thanks

=== Television ===
Year	Title	Credit	Notes
1998	The Pentagon Wars	Executive producer	Television film
2000	Celebrity	Executive producer	Television film
2001	Kate Brasher	Executive producer	
2002	The American Embassy	Executive producer	
2002	The Funkhousers	Executive producer	Television film
2001−02	UC: Undercover	Executive producer	
2003	Other People's Business	Executive producer	Television film
2004	Karen Sisco	Executive producer	
2016	Sweet/Vicious	Executive producer	
2016−18	Skylanders Academy	Executive producer	
2015−19	Into the Badlands	Executive producer	
2004−20	Reno 911!	Executive producer	
2020	Mrs. America	Executive producer	
2021	93rd Academy Awards		Television special
2021	Oscars: Into the Spotlight		Television special
2021	Oscars: After Dark		Television special
2021	Reno 911!: The Hunt for QAnon	Executive producer	Television film

== Awards and nominations ==
Year	Award	Category	Nominated work	Result	Ref.
2024	Locarno Film Festival	Raimondo Rezzonico Award	—N/a	Won	
