= Skylanders Academy =

Animated web television series

- Genre: Action-adventure; Comedy; Fantasy
- Based on: Skylanders by Activision
- Developed by: Eric Rogers
- Directed by: Arthur Qwak; Solène Azernour (season 2); Alban Rodriguez (season 3)
- Voices of: Justin Long; Ashley Tisdale; Jonathan Banks; Felicia Day; Chris Diamantopoulos; Bobcat Goldthwait; Grey Griffin; Richard Steven Horvitz; Norm Macdonald; Catherine O'Hara; Jonny Rees; Jason Ritter; Fred Tatasciore; Harland Williams
- Opening theme: "Harmony" by Timbaland feat. Dalton Diehl
- Composers: Conrad Wedde; Samuel Scott; Lukasz Buda
- Countries of origin: United States; France
- Original language: English
- No. of seasons: 3
- No. of episodes: 39

Production
- Executive producers: Bobby Kotick; Eric Rogers (seasons 1–2); Sander Schwartz (season 1); Stacey Sher; Nick van Dyk; Ian Weinreich (season 3); Clayton Sakoda (season 3); Coco Francini (season 3)
- Producers: Coco Francini (seasons 1–2); Emily Levitan (seasons 1–2)
- Running time: 22 Minutes (Regular); 44 Minutes (Special)
- Production companies: TeamTO; Activision Blizzard Studios

Original release
- Network: Netflix
- Release: October 28, 2016 – September 28, 2018

Skylanders Academy is an animated television series produced by TeamTO and Activision Blizzard Studios based on the Skylanders series. The first season premiered on Netflix on October 28, 2016. A trailer for the series premiered on October 12, 2016. The second season was released on October 6, 2017 and the third and final season was released on September 28, 2018.

On April 30, 2019, the series was confirmed to have concluded.

== Plot ==
Trailer for the second season

In the world of Skylands, Spyro the Dragon, Stealth Elf, and Eruptor are new graduates at Skylanders Academy. Under the teachings of Master Eon and Jet-Vac, the three of them will learn what it means to be a Skylander while fighting the evil Kaos and many other villains of Skylands.

== Voice cast ==
=== Main ===
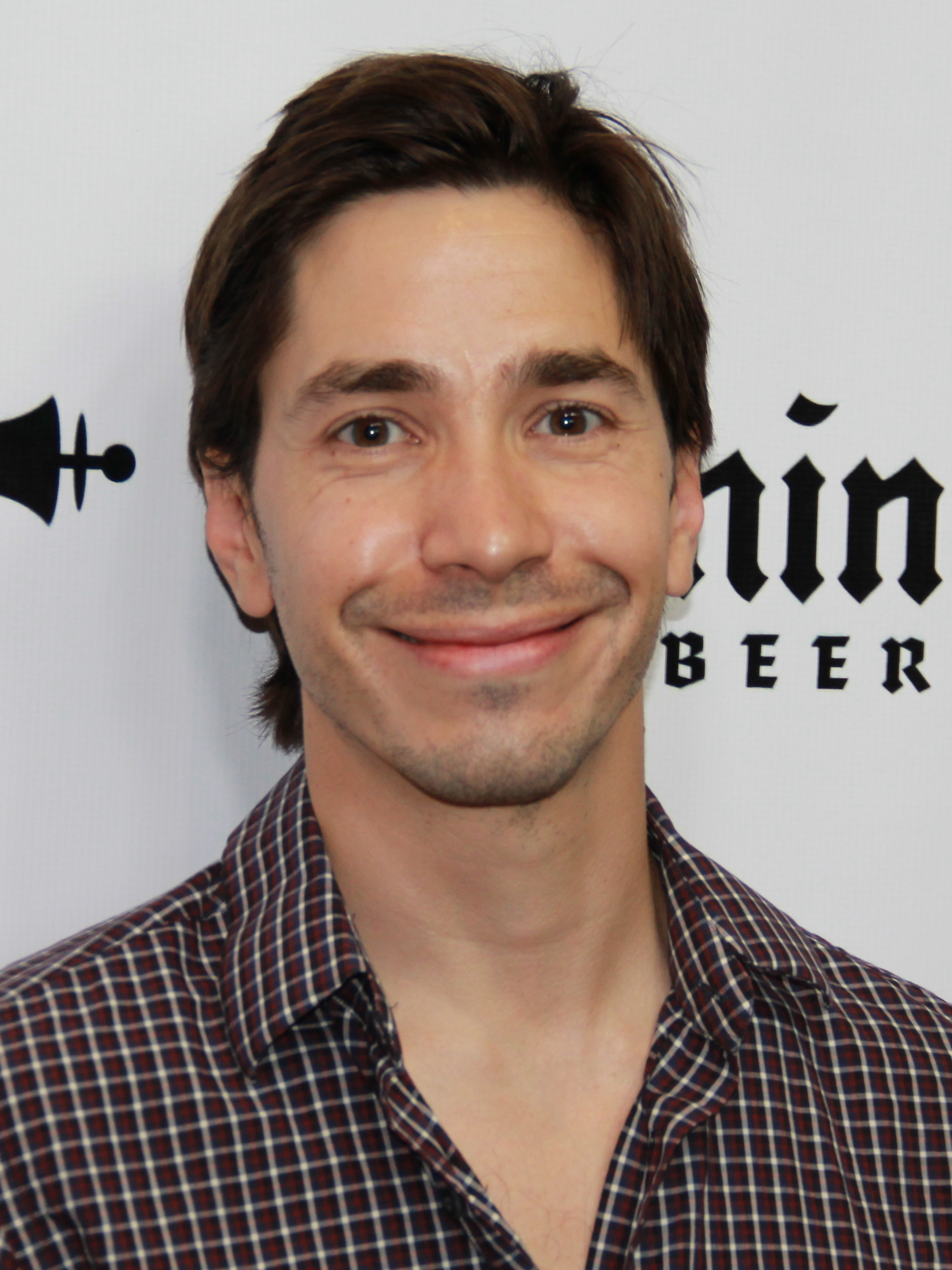
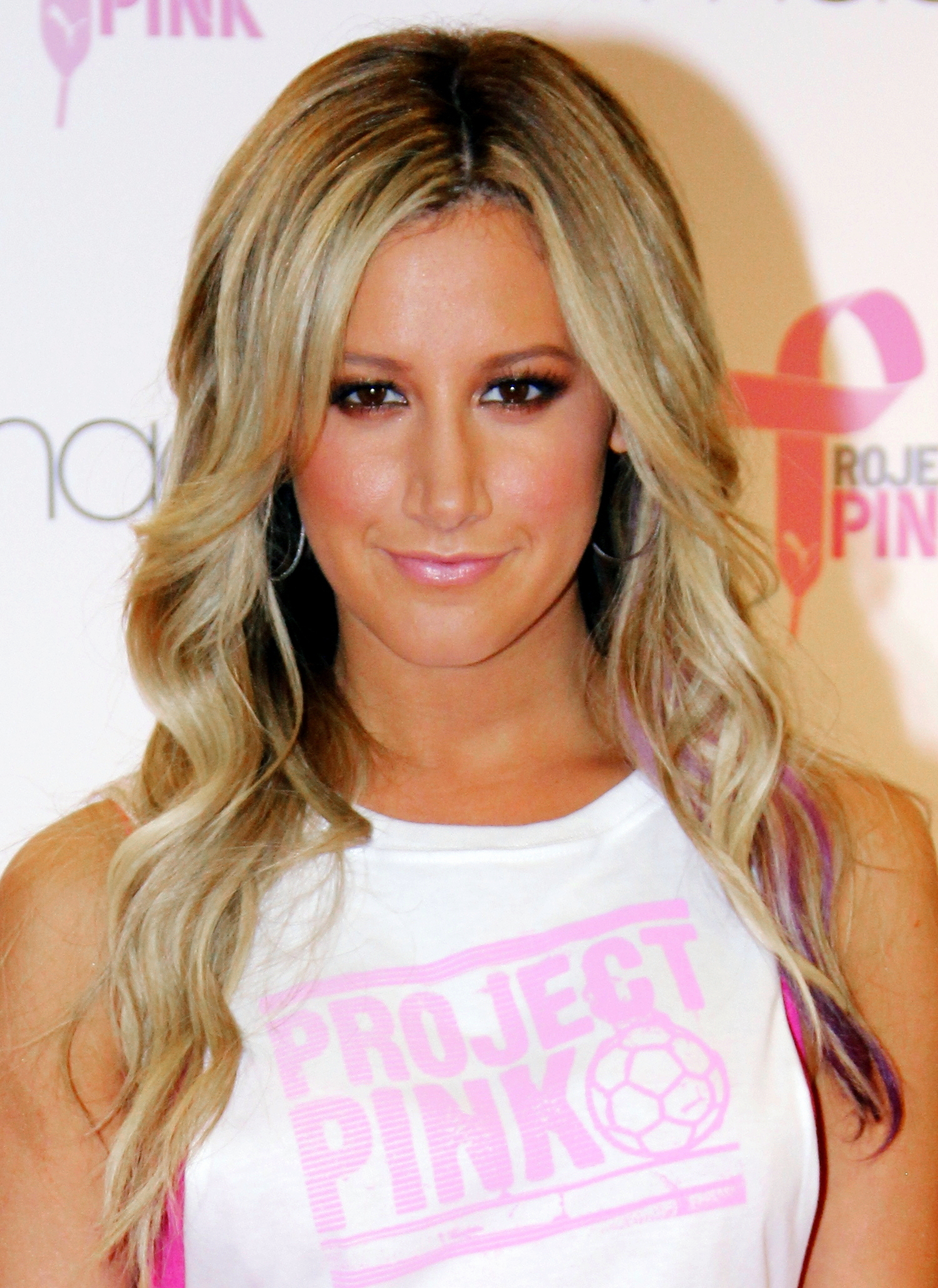
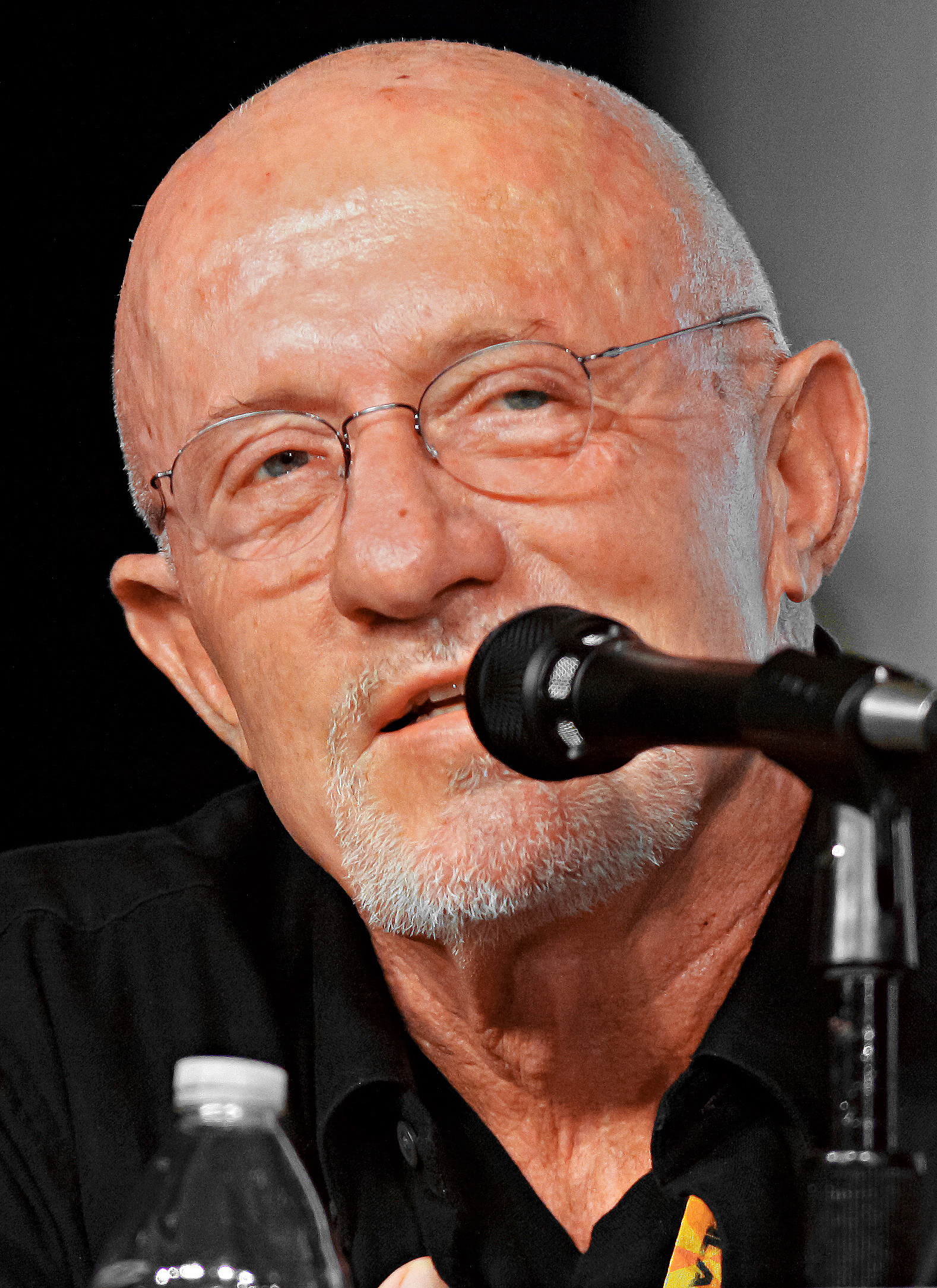
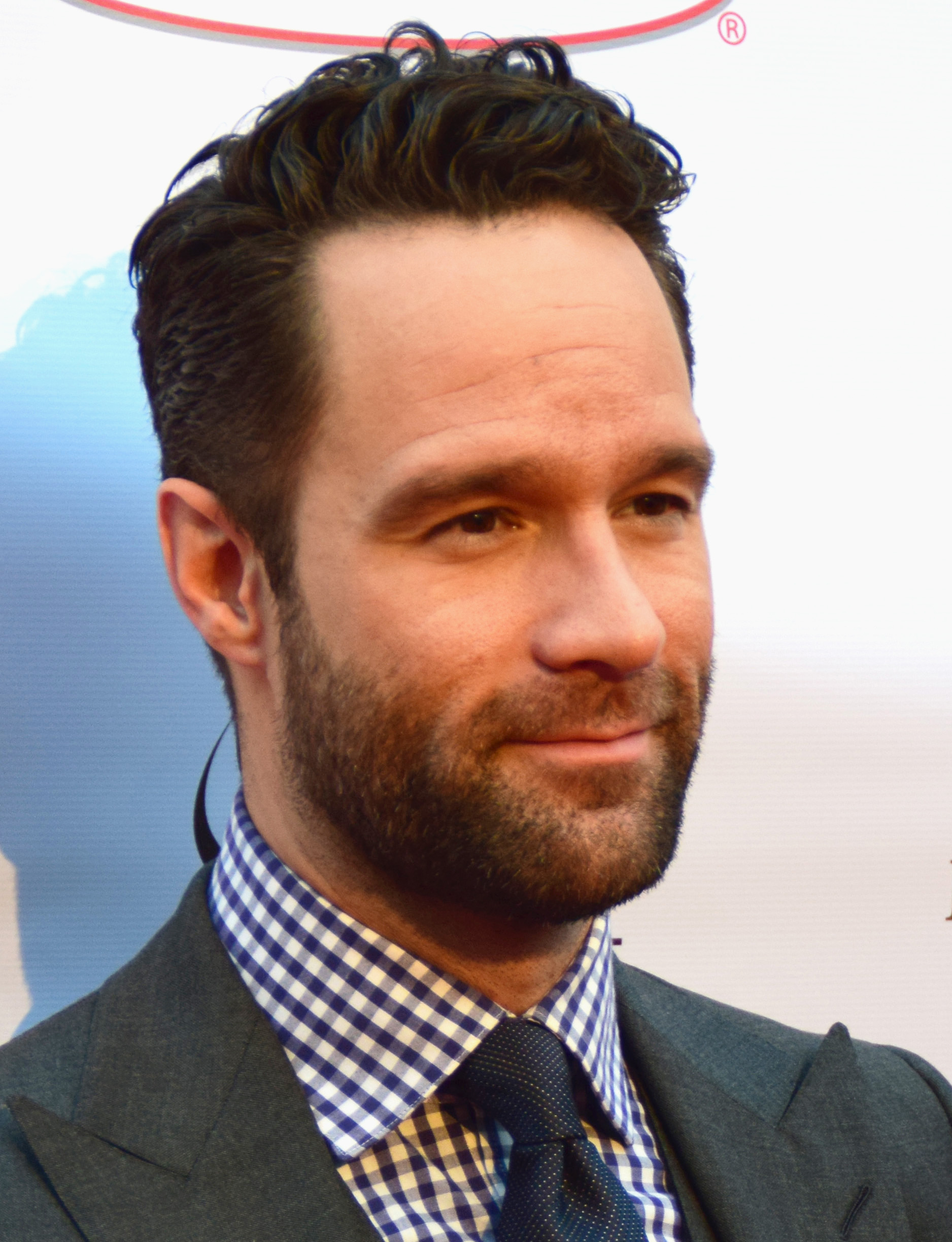
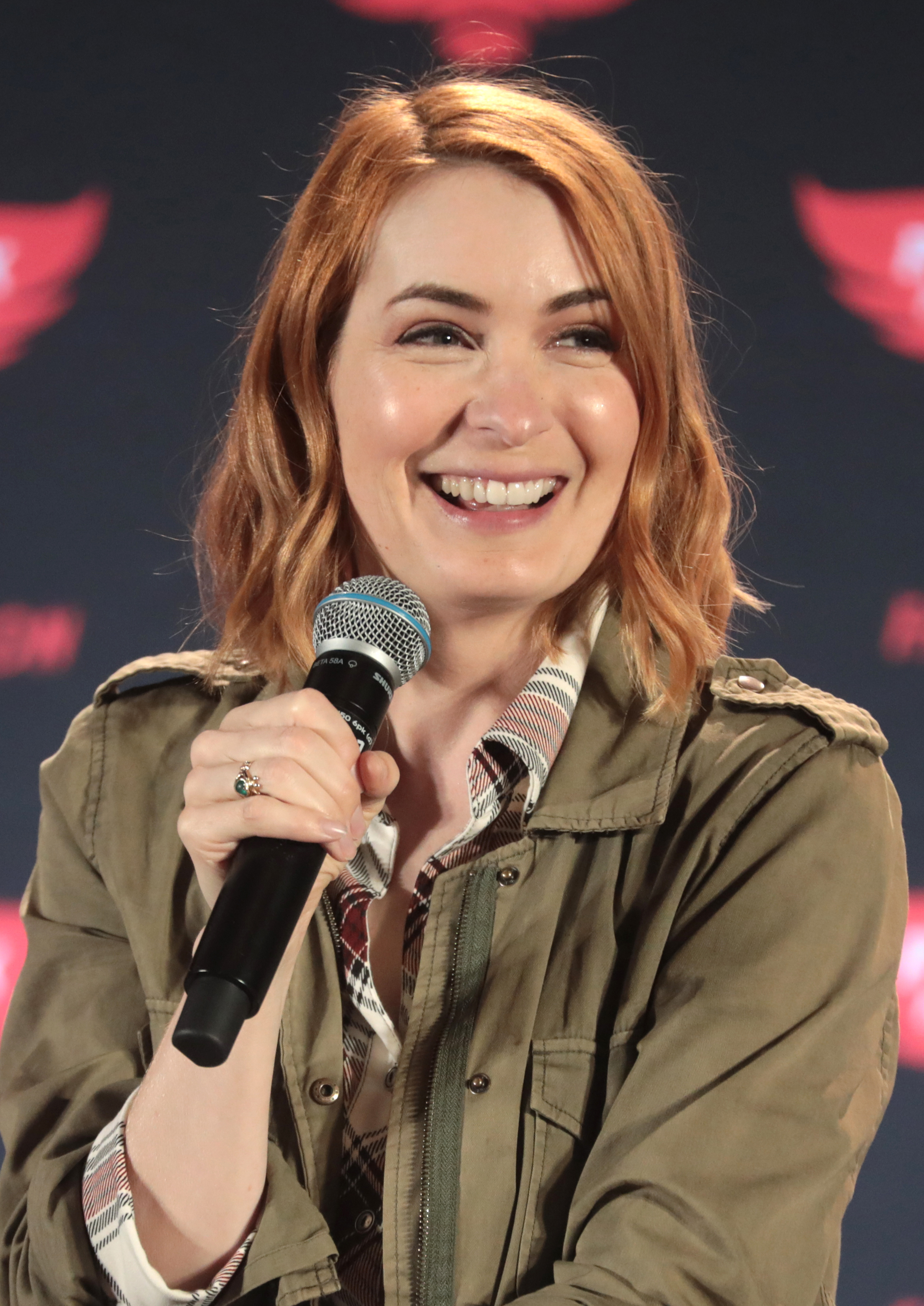
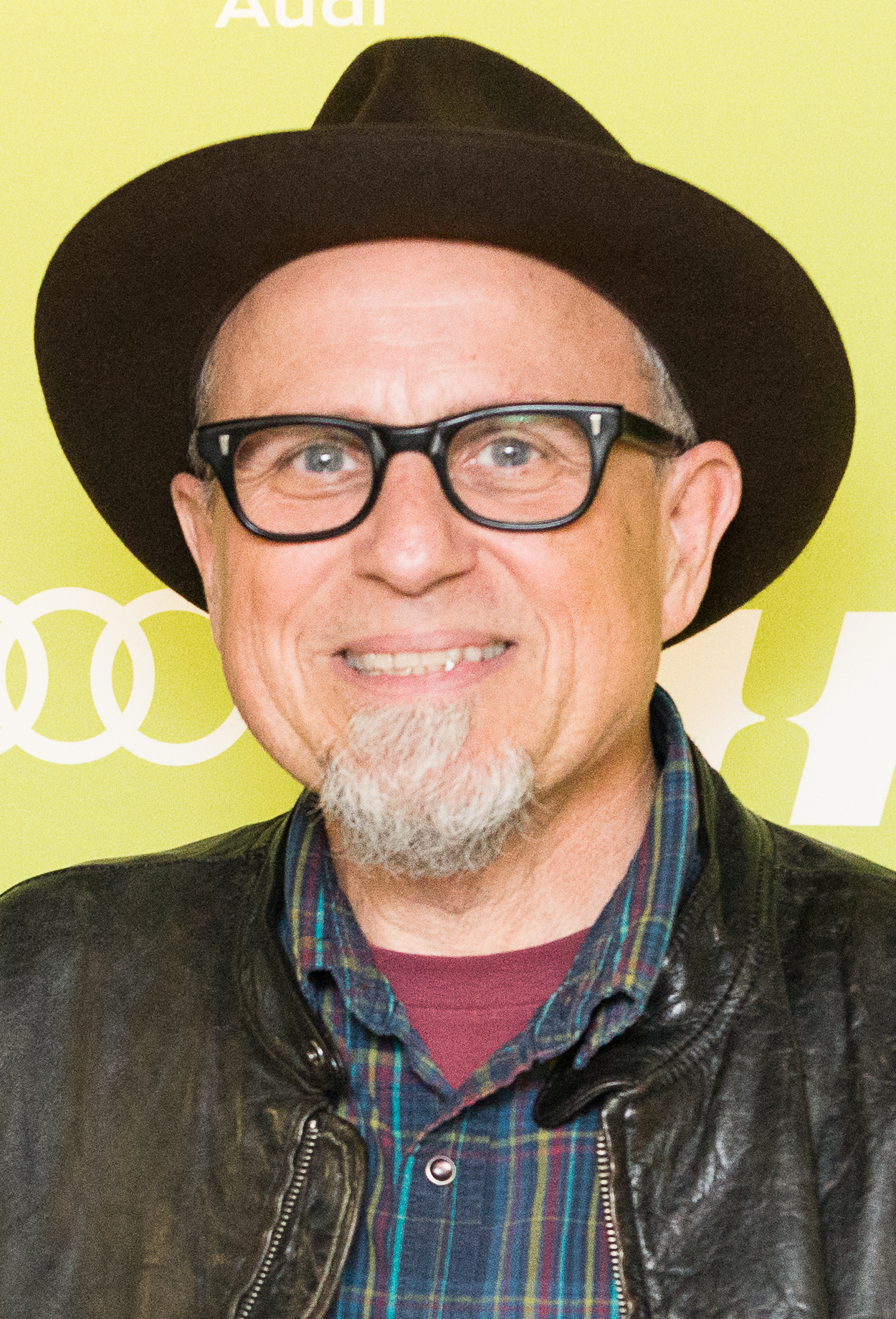
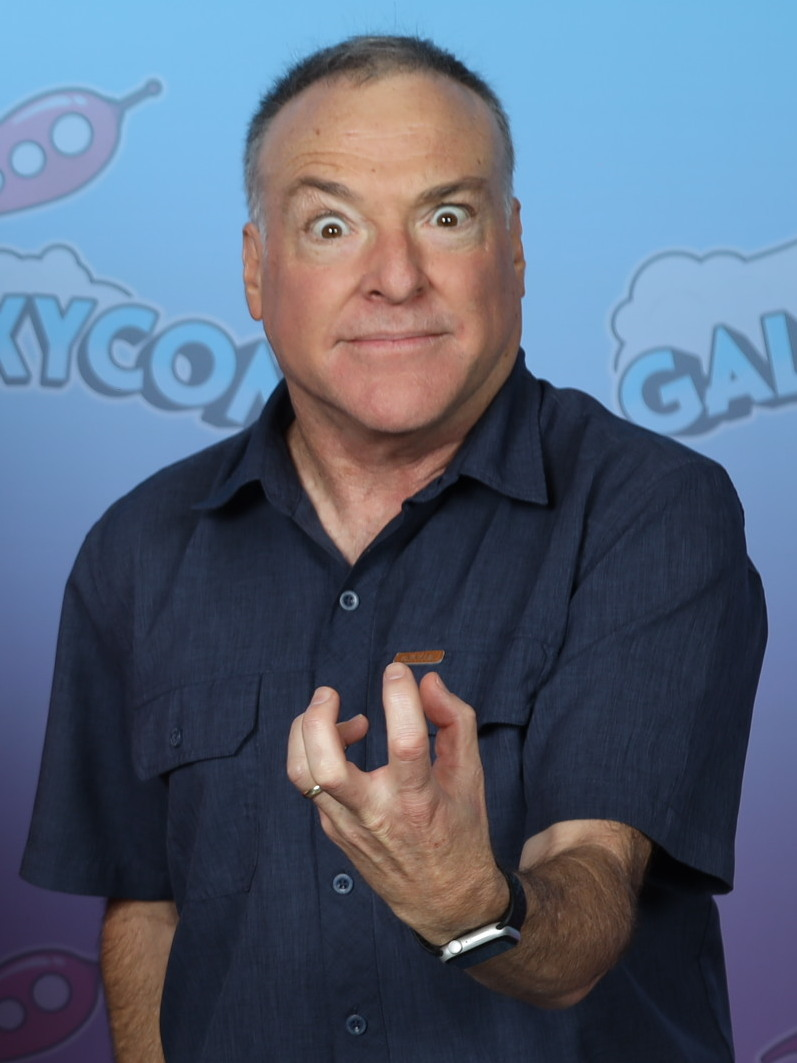
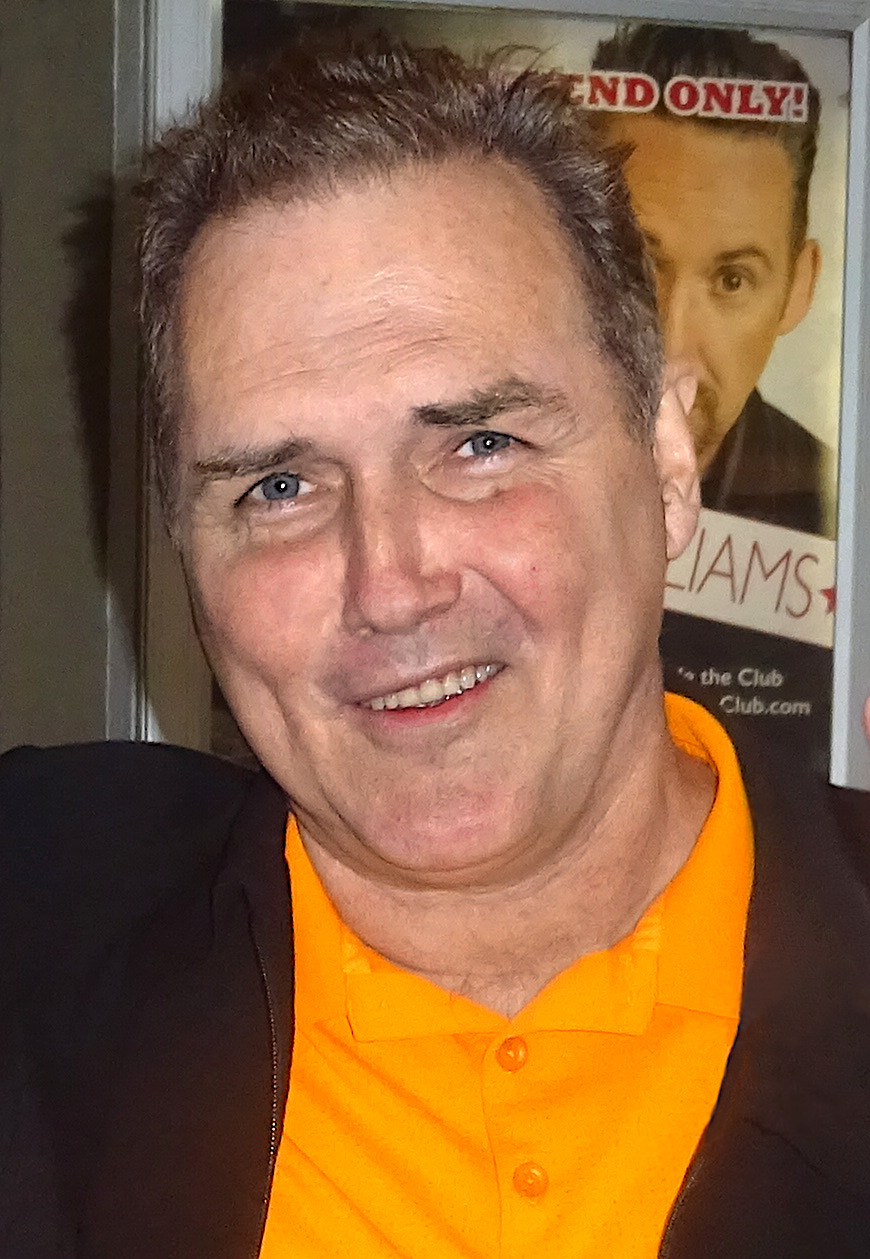
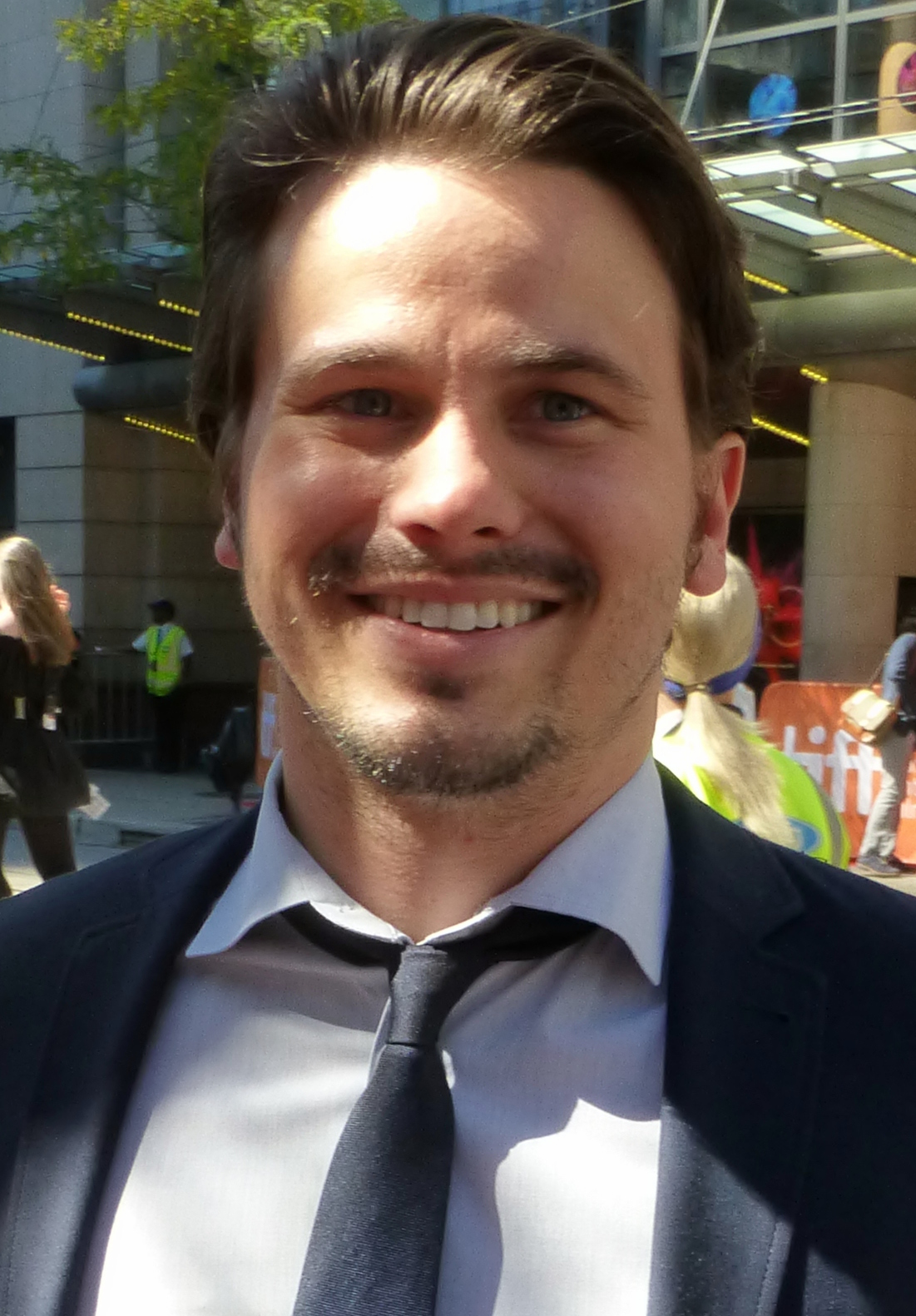
Justin Long (pictured in 2014), Ashley Tisdale (pictured in 2012), Jonathan Banks (pictured in 2012), Chris Diamantopoulos (pictured in 2015), Felicia Day (pictured in 2022), Bobcat Goldthwait (pictured in 2015), Richard Steven Horvitz (pictured in 2023), Norm Macdonald (pictured in 2016), and Jason Ritter (pictured in 2015), voiced the characters of as Spyro, Stealth Elf and Flashwing, Eruptor, Master Eon and Chompy Mage, Cynder, Pop Fizz, Kaos, Glumshanks and Dark Spyro, respectively.
- Justin Long as Spyro
  - Jason Ritter as Dark Spyro
- Ashley Tisdale as Stealth Elf, Flashwing
- Jonathan Banks as Eruptor
- Chris Diamantopoulos as Master Eon, Chompy Mage
- Daniel Wu as King Pen
- Harland Williams as Hugo
- Felicia Day as Cynder
- Bobcat Goldthwait as Pop Fizz
- Richard Steven Horvitz as Kaos
- Norm Macdonald as Glumshanks
- Jonny Rees as Jet-Vac

=== Recurring ===
- Dee Bradley Baker as Fire Viper, Male Hydra Heads, Baby Greeble
- Chris Cox as Bomb-Shell
- Jim Cummings as Malefor
- John DiMaggio as Chef Pepper Jack, Bad Breath, Fisticuffs
- James Hetfield as Wolfgang
- Catherine O'Hara as Kaossandra
- Grey Griffin as Sprocket, Ninjini, Jackie (Female Hydra Head), Chill
- John Mathot as a Kindly Mabu Prisoner
- Parker Posey as the Dreamcatcher
- Fred Tatasciore as Snap Shot, Strykore, Arkeyan Robots
- Susan Sarandon as Golden Queen
- Wallace Shawn as a Mabu Inspector
- Jill Talley as Roller Brawl, Claire, Greebles
- Courtenay Taylor as Hex
- Josh Robert Thompson as Skull
- Patrick Warburton as Flynn
- Eric Rogers (Season 1) and Rhys Darby (Season 3) as Crash Bandicoot
- Billy West as Food Fight, Ka-Boom, Trigger Happy, Greebles
- Cedric Yarbrough as Broccoli Guy, Wind-Up, Dale

=== Guest ===
- Tara Strong as Coco Bandicoot
- DanTDM as Cy (Water Imaginator)
- Fred Willard as Mabu Race Announcer

== Episodes ==
=== Series overview ===
Season	Episodes	Originally released
1	13	October 28, 2016
2	13	October 6, 2017
3	13	September 28, 2018

=== Season 1 (2016) ===
No. overall	No. in season	Title	Directed by	Written by	Release date
1–2	1–2	"Skylanders Unite!"	Arthur Qwak	Eric Rogers	October 28, 2016
Part 1:In Skylanders Academy, the training institution for new generations of Skylanders, fellow students Spyro the dragon, Stealth Elf, and Eruptor prepare for graduation. Unfortunately, Spyro's oversized ego tempered by Master Eon's constant praise gets in the way of his becoming a Skylander when he throws a party for the whole school and oversleeps, failing his final exam while his friends pass on. Part 2:Meanwhile, Kaos, longtime enemy of the Skylanders, sneaks into the Academy to locate the map to the Core of Light and steals the Book of Skylanders, freezing all the Skylanders and leaving Spyro the only one able to stop him. Though he is nearly defeated, he manages to unfreeze the book and release the others who manage to defeat Kaos. For his courage and newfound humility, Master Eon makes Spyro a full-fledged Skylander.
3	3	"My Way or the Sky Way"	Arthur Qwak	Eric Rogers	October 28, 2016
The newly formed core Skylander team faces issues when Spyro's impulsive attitude clashes with Jet-Vac's rigid "Skylander Way" approach. Jet-Vac decides to move into their house to try and drill Spyro into a more refined Skylander, but his method of thorough planning causes more problems when they arrive almost too late to save the Falling Forest from burning. Eon reminds Jet-Vac that instinct is just as important as training for a Skylander, and Jet-Vac and Spyro reconcile their differences in time to stop Kaos, attempting to use a hypnotized Hugo to infiltrate the Relics Room disguised as a restaurant mascot, and the team celebrates by making Jet-Vac's move-in permanent.
4	4	"Missing Links"	Arthur Qwak; Co-Director: Solène Azernour	Josh Haber	October 28, 2016
The Skylanders have formed into a team, but their teamwork is shown to be poor as they consistently fail to pass a basic Fire Viper training test. To help them get to the heart of this issue, Eon's old friend Sensei King Pen shows them how to overcome their obstacle by giving them the opportunity to build a new teammate, the result being a banana-headed Skylander named Cy. Though he is equipped with all of their powers, Cy still struggles as each of the Skylanders show him how to use their powers insisting their style is superior. This leads to more of the same when a real Fire Viper attacks the Academy, leading the Skylanders to realize they must combine their powers together and finally attain victory.
5	5	"Dream Girls"	Arthur Qwak; Co-Director: Solène Azernour	Josh Haber, Joanna Lewis, and Kristine Songco	October 28, 2016
Stealth Elf is selected to give a SED (Skills, Elements & Defense) Talk to the cadets at the Academy, though she expresses doubt that she is capable of giving worthy advice. Meanwhile, everyone at the Academy, including her teammates, suddenly share Hugo's irrational fear of sheep, leading Stealth Elf to devote herself to discovering the cause. She soon finds it in Dreamcatcher, who embraces evil and uses her powers to plague dreams, but Stealth Elf uses her skill and cunning to defeat her at her own game in the Dream Realm. Dreamcatcher is expelled from the Academy and arrested along with Kaos, once again trying to sneak in, while Elf returns in time to give a rousing speech to the Academy.
6	6	"The Hole Truth"	Arthur Qwak; Co-Director: Solène Azernour	Dean Stefan	October 28, 2016
As per regulations, Spyro, Stealth Elf, and Eruptor are assigned as guards at Cloudcracker Prison, home to the worst criminals in the Skylands, including the infamous Doom Raiders led by the Golden Queen. The Doom Raiders decide to use the tense trio to their advantage and trick them into sending each of them into 'The Hole,' the maximum-security area in the prison. Though the Skylanders manage to realize the deception, the Doom Raiders are still able to combine their evil powers and escape the prison with Kaos tagging along. The three are regretful but resolve to recapture the Doom Raiders before they can wreak havoc on the Skylands.
7	7	"Space Invaders"	Arthur Qwak; Co-Director: Solène Azernour	Duane Capizzi	October 28, 2016
The Doom Raiders have taken refuge in Kaos's castle and berate him more by the second when they take over. Meanwhile, the Skylanders and Eon go on a training retreat in the Falling Forest to improve their combat skills and teamwork, but it slowly turns into a camping trip to Stealth Elf's dismay. They are soon interrupted by an astral projection of Kaos's head that captures Stealth Elf, trapping her inside Kaos's mind. Stealth Elf controls Kaos into sneaking back into the Academy where the others are grieving over her assumed demise, and manages to convince them to help her escape. Kaos, who had won some slight respect from the Doom Raiders thanks to Stealth Elf's control, retreats and returns to being demeaned.
8	8	"Anger Mismanagement"	Arthur Qwak; Co-Director: Solène Azernour	Eric Rogers and Josh Haber	October 28, 2016
Eruptor's short fuse causes problems with the team's missions when he blunders their latest attempt to capture the Doom Raider Chef Pepper Jack. Eon and the others convince him to go to anger management in order to put his fiery temper under control so that he will be more 'in balance.' Unfortunately, Pepper Jack infiltrates the Skylanders' annual Chili Chomp contest and incapacitates all the Skylanders with a poisoned chili while he goes to blow up the Academy. It is only when Eruptor taps back into his inner fire that he manages to stop Pepper Jack and save the Academy, and he finally gains proper control of his emotions.
9	9	"Pop Rocks"	Arthur Qwak; Co-Director: Solène Azernour	Jesse Porter	October 28, 2016
The Skylanders plan to attend the Skylands Music Festival to stop Wolfgang, another Doom Raider, from using his evil music to transform the crowd into an army of mindless drones. Pop Fizz, who the young Skylanders learn was once in a band with Wolfgang before they chose different paths, is particularly determined to stop him, but the potion he concocts to defend them from Wolfgang's spell instead reverts his memories to before he became a Skylander. Wolfgang uses this to his advantage and tricks Pop into believing they still have their band in order to easily gain access to the stage and enact his plan. Pop however regains his memory and defeats Wolfgang in a music battle, sending the Doom Raider running and leaving the Skylanders to enjoy the festival.
10	10	"Beard Science"	Arthur Qwak; Co-Director: Solène Azernour	Josh Haber	October 28, 2016
Kaos continues to be unsuccessful in his attempts to get the attention of the Golden Queen, who seems to have an infatuation with hair. He uses a spell to gain a new hairdo and ends up stealing Master Eon's beloved beard, the source of his magical power, and instantly gains respect from everyone. At the same time, Eon is rendered completely invisible and forgotten by everyone at the Academy, and with no power or ability to command respect, he decides to leave the Academy. He manages to catch Kaos with his beard, which has caught the eye of the Golden Queen, and manages to take it back in a magical duel. With his beard, the Skylanders notice him and Kaos is rejected by the Queen, returning everything to normal.
11	11	"The Skylands Are Falling!"	Arthur Qwak; Co-Director: Solène Azernour	Eric Rogers and Brittany Jo Flores	October 28, 2016
When the Skylanders fail to stop Bomb Shell from destroying Eon's bronzed beard statue, Spyro convinces Pop Fizz to build the "Evil Scope," a machine that uses a lens enchanted by an unwitting Kaos to detect evil before it can be enacted. Spyro obsessively uses the scope to stop evil all over the Skylands, leaving the other Skylanders and even villains across the Skylands to enjoy more complacent lives, but the wayward evil soon clusters together into a giant black ball that threatens to destroy the Skylands and traps Spyro inside. Realizing that his actions have caused a great imbalance, Spyro escapes the ball, imploding it, but its destruction accidentally brings Crash Bandicoot to their world.
12	12	"Crash Landing"	Arthur Qwak; Co-Director: Solène Azernour	Eric Rogers and Brittany Jo Flores	October 28, 2016
After Crash Bandicoot is somehow transported into their world, the Skylanders have to help him get home by finding a dark relic. While searching for the Relic, Spyro begins to idolize and even attempts to imitate Crash. The Skylanders were able to find the Relic in the form of Kaossandra's evil book, which Kaos stole in order to gain its power, but needed a villain to open it; the one he chose being Chompy Mage. The Skylanders are able to get the book and return to the academy where Eon uses it to summon a portal back to Crash's world, however using it corrupts Eon with darkness.
13	13	"Assault on Skylander Academy"	Arthur Qwak; Co-Director: Solène Azernour	Eric Rogers	October 28, 2016
When Eon falls seriously ill after using the book of darkness, the Skylanders must race to find the Core of Light to use its power to heal him. Meanwhile, the Doom Raiders attack the academy, but are pushed back by the cadets. Kaossandra arrives and strikes a deal with the Golden Queen- she takes back her book and the Doom Raiders keep the academy. They succeed in finding the book and Eon, but the Golden Queen goes back on her word and keeps it. Kaos is forced to choose sides and chooses to side with the Golden Queen, forcing Kaossandra to kick him out. She uses a powerful spell to knock out the Doom Raiders and leave with Glumshanks, but is forced to leave the book behind. The Doom Raiders, with Kaos, retreat as the Skylanders return with the Core of Light's energy to cure Eon. Fully healed, Eon says he'll lock the book in a safe place where nobody can find it, but in truth returns it to Kaossandra as the two are secretly allied in using it to keep a much more powerful and sinister evil locked in a dark realm.

=== Season 2 (2017) ===
No. overall	No. in season	Title	Directed by	Written by	Release date
13	1	"Spyromania"	Arthur Qwak and Solène Azernour	Ian Weinreich and Clayton Sakoda	October 6, 2017
Spyro wants to prove that he has his own superpower, or unique ability as the case would be, like the other Skylanders, feeling worthless without one. However, when he encounters Bomb Shell and fails to find and remove a bomb, he discovers he does have a power: impenetrable scales. Eon, though, starts concealing information about Spyro's ancestors.
14	2	"I Dream of Ninjini"	Arthur Qwak and Solène Azernour	Julia Yorks	October 6, 2017
Master Eon tells Stealth Elf to seek training from an elusive ninja named Ninjini, a once-great warrior who doubts her current abilities.
15	3	"Return to Cynder"	Arthur Qwak and Solène Azernour	Nick Confalone	October 6, 2017
When Spyro is tasked with helping a new dragoness cadet named Cynder, he goes a little overboard with instructing her on how to deal with villains, which may be a big mistake when it turns out her father is Malefor, the Dragon King of the Underworld. While the Skylanders manage to convince her that her past does not matter and defeat Malefor, he gives Spyro unsettling information about Eon's deception.
16	4	"Thankstaking for the Memories"	Arthur Qwak and Solène Azernour	Nick Confalone	October 6, 2017
Spyro and Stealth Elf get locked in the Grand Library while everybody else is gone for a long holiday weekend.
17	5	"Elementary, My Dear Eruptor"	Arthur Qwak and Solène Azernour	Jim Martin	October 6, 2017
Eruptor discovers he has the Sherlock Holmes-like ability to figure out who's guilty of committing evil deeds. However, he starts becoming cocky about his abilities, and this may not bode well, especially since Kaos and Broccoli Guy are on a quest to absorb all of Skylands' elements. Spyro also starts wondering if Eruptor can find out what Eon is hiding.
18	6	"Split Decision"	Arthur Qwak and Solène Azernour	Natalie Hazen	October 6, 2017
When Skull decides to break away from Hex, Hex turns evil and tries to transform the others at the Academy into zombie-like drones. Meanwhile, Kaos leaves the Doom Raiders.
19	7	"The People vs. Pop Fizz"	Arthur Qwak and Solène Azernour	Jesse Porter	October 6, 2017
Pop Fizz is arrested and put on trial for committing robberies all over the Skylands, and the other Skylanders have to help find the real culprits.
20	8	"One Flu Over the Skylander’s Nest"	Arthur Qwak and Solène Azernour	Story by : Eric Rogers; Teleplay by : Patrick Rigney and Eric Rogers	October 6, 2017
Eon comes to the team house to lead training, but the house is quarantined and everyone ends up getting sick.
21	9	"Belly of the Beast"	Arthur Qwak and Solène Azernour	Ian Weinreich and Clayton Sakoda	October 6, 2017
While fighting the evil Fire Viper, the gang ends up inside its belly and must put aside personal differences to find a way out.
22	10	"Who’s Your Daddy?"	Arthur Qwak and Solène Azernour	Joanna Lewis and Kristine Songco	October 6, 2017
When one of Jet-Vac's eggs hatches, he must try to be a good father to the baby inside. Kaos and Glumshanks believe they might be father and son.
23	11	"Sheep(ball) Dreams"	Arthur Qwak and Solène Azernour	Brittany Jo Flores	October 6, 2017
Dreamcatcher is offered a deal in her dream realm by the unnamed dark villain, whose name is revealed to be Strykore. Strykore reveals where Koassandra’s castle is, and Dreamcatcher attempts to lead the Doom Raiders there. During the voyage, the Doom Raiders lose Dreamcatcher, who gets amnesia, giving the Skylanders a chance to bring her back to the Academy and prevent her from returning to her evil ways. During this time in the middle of the night, Dreamcatcher encounters Strykore in her dream realm. Furious at Dreamcatcher for not keeping true to her end of the bargain, Strykore threatens her until she awakens. Stealth Elf comforts Dreamcatcher, who (having heard Strykore refer to himself under third-person) mutters out Strykore’s name. The next day, Stealth Elf asks Eon about it, and mentions Strykore’s name, which Eon seems to recognise, before quickly denying such knowledge. The Doom Raiders then attack the academy, with the Golden Queen mentioning Strykore by name in front of the Skylanders, with Stealth Elf once more, noticing that Eon seems to recognise the name. After Dreamcatcher ends up remembering and returning to her evil ways, Stealth Elf tells Spyro about Eon’s claims not knowing anything about Strykore, and the possibility that Eon has also been lying about several other thins, including Spyro’s ancestors. Meanwhile, the Doom Raiders attack Kaossandra’s castle, with the Golden Queen, to Kaos’ horror, turning Kaossandra into gold due to the sorceress’ weakening power.
24	12	"It Techs Two"	Arthur Qwak and Solène Azernour	Johanna Richie	October 6, 2017
Jet-Vac feels insecure about his role with the Skylanders when Sprocket is brought in and starts taking care of tech-related problems. However, when technology across Skylands fails, the two must put aside their differences to save the Core of Light. Spyro also finally confronts Eon and he reveals the truth: Spyro's dragon ancestors were heroes tasked with defending the Core of Light, but Strykore corrupted them, forcing Eon to banish them away. Hurt deeply by Eon's deception, Spyro leaves the Academy. Meanwhile, Kaos, after escaping from the Doom Raiders, finds Kaossandra’s book but after opening it, Strykore then reveals himself to Kaos, saying that he is Kaos’s father.
25	13	"Touch of Evil"	Arthur Qwak and Solène Azernour	Eric Rogers	October 6, 2017
As he tries to learn more about his ancestors, Spyro searches for Malefor, but Malefor isn't one to talk to, beats the dragon to a pulp and uses him as a bargaining chip to get his daughter Cynder back. Kaos attempts to free Strykore, who claims to be the father of Kaos and is seeking to conquer Skylands. Kaos obtains power from Strykore and uses it to get his power back from his mother and take hers as well, forcing her to run away on a Hydra. However, the portal will only open when he absorbs the light of a powerful Skylander, with Kaos 'volunteering' Spyro. He strikes a deal with Malefor, who knows who Strykore is, and hands Spyro over in exchange for being on Strykore's good side and probable power gain. Cynder and Spyro's team arrive to demand Spyro back from Malefor, defeating him easily, but when Malefor plays coy, apologizing to his daughter for all his wrongdoings, he takes her and leaves. Kaos brings Spyro to Strykore and he absorbs his power, destroying the prison and freeing him, and also corrupting Spyro into 'Dark Spyro', his evil counterpart. The team returns to the Academy just as Kaossandra arrives, revealing what happened and asking for help. Eon decides to reveal to the truth to everyone, taking off his helm to reveal the same mark on his forehead as Kaos, suggesting they may be related.

=== Season 3 (2018) ===
No. overall	No. in season	Title	Directed by	Written by	Release date
26	1	"Power Struggle"	Arthur Qwak and Alban Rodriguez	Ian Weinreich and Clayton Sakoda	September 28, 2018
The evil Strykore assigns Kaos and Dark Spyro to kidnap King Pen as part of a master plan to rule the Skylands. Stealth Elf befriends Kaossandra.
27	2	"The Truth is in Here"	Arthur Qwak and Alban Rodriguez	Ian Weinreich and Clayton Sakoda	September 28, 2018
The Skylanders are pumped when Dark Spyro returns to the Academy, but his old friends does not realize he is up to something.
28	3	"Sky Hard"	Arthur Qwak and Alban Rodriguez	Ian Weinreich and Clayton Sakoda	September 28, 2018
The Skylanders get a little too confident in their abilities after winning a big award for being the greatest heroes in the Skylands. However, when a mysterious villain starts issuing bomb threats, the cocky heroes may find themselves in bigger trouble.
29	4	"A Traitor Among Us"	Arthur Qwak and Alban Rodriguez	Julia Yorks	September 28, 2018
When Eon increases his beardy sense, he discovers that there is a traitor at the Academy - and Eruptor is convinced it is Kaossandra.
30	5	"In Like Flynn"	Arthur Qwak and Alban Rodriguez	Jesse Porter	September 28, 2018
Eon decides to recruit hotshot pilot Captain Flynn to help the team, only to discover that he might not live up to his legend.
31	6	"Weekend at Eon's"	Arthur Qwak and Alban Rodriguez	Ian Weinreich and Clayton Sakoda	September 28, 2018
When Eon is knocked out by Food Fight, Jet-Vac and Dark Spyro have to take over his body for a meeting with an important inspector.
32	7	"Road Rage"	Arthur Qwak and Alban Rodriguez	Julia Yorks	September 28, 2018
Dark Spyro leaves a bracelet for Stealth Elf to find that it will turn her evil, but it winds up on Kaossandra's wrist.
33	8	"Three Sides to Every Story"	Arthur Qwak and Alban Rodriguez	Ian Weinreich and Clayton Sakoda	September 28, 2018
Jet-Vac believes someone vaporized Master Eon, and the three main suspects are Eruptor, Dark Spyro and Stealth Elf - who each have differing stories.
34	9	"Days of Future Crash"	Arthur Qwak and Alban Rodriguez	Josh Hale Fialkov	September 28, 2018
Eruptor and Dark Spyro need to talk to Crash Bandicoot, so they travel back in time to find him. But when they return, the present isn't like they left it.
35	10	"Off to the Races"	Arthur Qwak and Alban Rodriguez	Jesse Porter	September 28, 2018
The Skylanders try to take down Kaos and the Doom Raiders in a big race called the Skylands 500. But working together as a team proves difficult.
36	11	"Split"	Arthur Qwak and Alban Rodriguez	Ian Weinreich and Clayton Sakoda	September 28, 2018
To cure Dark Spyro of his darkness, the Skylanders will have to go on a dangerous mission to find the venom of a Fire Viper.
37	12	"Raiders of the Lost Arkus"	Arthur Qwak and Alban Rodriguez	Ian Weinreich and Clayton Sakoda	September 28, 2018
38	13	"Raiders of the Lost Arkus"	Arthur Qwak and Alban Rodriguez	Ian Weinreich and Clayton Sakoda	September 28, 2018
Part 1: The Skylanders need to get to Arkus before Strykore and his minions, and a bold plan is the only way to pull it off. Part 2: As the Skylanders race against time to stop Kaos from destroying the Core of Light, Strykore attempts to pull Kaossandra back to the evil side.

== Production ==
At an Investor Day presentation on November 6, 2015, Activision Blizzard announced the formation of Activision Blizzard Studios, a film production subsidiary dedicated to creating original films and television series. Headed by former The Walt Disney Company executive Nick van Dyk, Activision Blizzard Studios would look to produce and adapting Skylanders into a film and television series; the latter being called Skylanders Academy, which started airing on October 28, 2016 on Netflix.

The series is a spin-off, said to be separate from the storyline of the games with no direct tie-ins to sequels. In addition, the different voice cast is made to give the show its own separate identity. However, despite the changes, Richard Horvitz, Jonny Rees, Bobcat Goldthwait, Billy West, Fred Tatasciore, and Courtenay Taylor are the only actors from the games to reprise their roles as Kaos, Jet-Vac, Pop Fizz, Food Fight, Snap Shot, and Hex respectively. Patrick Warburton would later go on to reprise his role as Captain Flynn in the third season. Showrunner Eric Rogers provided the voice of Crash Bandicoot due to his creative partners being impressed on giving the character an Australian Accent during a temp-track he recorded.

The trailer for the second season was released on September 19, 2017. Mark Hamill was originally considered to reprise his role as Malefor, a character that originated from The Legend of Spyro: Dawn of the Dragon, but was unable to as he was busy filming Star Wars: The Last Jedi. Flynn, Sal, Whirlwind, Fiesta, Tree Rex, Jawbreaker, The Gulper and Dr. Krankcase were characters planned to appear in the second season, but were cut due to budget reasons. Flynn himself, would later go on to appear in the following season a year later.

The trailer for the third season was released on September 18, 2018. During production of Season three, Eric Rogers stepped down as showrunner and was replaced by both Clayton Sakoda and Ian Weinreich in his absence, and due to his departure, Rogers was unable to reprise Crash Bandicoot and was later replaced by Rhys Darby.

== Reception ==
=== Awards and nominations ===
Year	Award	Category	Nominee	Status	Ref.
2017	6th Annual BTVA People's Choice Awards	Best Male Lead Vocal Performance in a Television Series	Jonathan Banks (Eruptor)	Nominated	
2017	Kidscreen Awards	Best New Series for Kids	Skylanders Academy	Nominated	
2018	Daytime Emmy Award	Outstanding Performer in an Animated Program	Christopher Diamantopoulos (Master Eon)	Nominated	
2019	Annie Awards	Outstanding Achievement for Voice Acting in an Animated Television / Broadcast Production	Patrick Warburton (Flynn)	Nominated	
