= Activision Blizzard Studios =

American film and television production company

Activision Blizzard Studios, LLC
- Type: Subsidiary
- Industry: Film production; Television production
- Founded: November 6, 2015; 10 years ago
- Defunct: 2021; 5 years ago
- Fate: Dormancy
- Headquarters: Beverly Hills, California, US
- Key people: Stacey Sher (co-president); Nick van Dyk (co-president)
- Parent: Activision Blizzard

Activision Blizzard Studios, LLC was an American motion picture production company and a subsidiary of American video game company Activision Blizzard based in Beverly Hills, California. It was created to utilize its parent company's popular game franchises through films and television shows. It was co-headed by Stacey Sher and Nick van Dyk, the latter being a former executive of The Walt Disney Company.

In 2021, the two co-presidents of Activision Blizzard Studios departed to explore other opportunities, and given the lack of production since 2018, it is likely that the studio has ceased operations.

== History ==
At an investor day presentation on November 6, 2015, in the wake of the Warcraft feature film, Activision Blizzard announced the formation of Activision Blizzard Studios, a film production subsidiary dedicated to creating original television series and films based on their video game franchises. In January 2016, the company announced that the studio will be co-headed by producer Stacey Sher and former The Walt Disney Company executive Nick van Dyk.

In 2016, the company partnered with Netflix to exclusively air its first television program, an animated series based on Activision's video game series Skylanders, called Skylanders Academy.

Also in 2016, Activision Blizzard Studios entered into a content licensing agreement with a third-party production studio, Legendary Pictures, to produce sequels to the Warcraft feature film, based on their video game franchise World of Warcraft. By April 2017, work on a film based on Activision's video game series Call of Duty had generated several scripts, with the hope that filming would begin in 2018. The company also hopes to create films based on Overwatch and others.

A movie for Call of Duty has been announced in 2015 during the investor day, however in 2020 the movie director Stefano Sollima said the movie production is "in limbo" and "has stood still", saying “the idea of expanding the universe, the world of Call of Duty, is no longer at the moment an industrial priority of the group, of Activision.”

Activision Blizzard Studios no longer appears on the corporate website, and there has been no content produced or released since 2018. Additionally, both co-presidents of the studio seem to have departed, suggesting that the company may no longer be active.

== Productions ==
=== Film ===
Year	Title	Co-production with	Distributed by
TBA	Untitled Call of Duty film series	TBA	TBA

=== Television ===
Year	Title	Co-production with	Network
2016–2018	Skylanders Academy	TeamTO	Netflix

=== Cancelled ===
Year	Title	Co-production with	Network
2021	Untitled Crash Bandicoot animated series	Amazon Studios	Amazon Prime Video
