= Skylanders: SuperChargers =

2015 video game

- Developers: Vicarious Visions; Beenox (Note: In addition to offering development support for all versions, the Wii and 3DS versions were developed fully by Beenox.)
- Publisher: Activision
- Director: Brent Gibson
- Producer: Dawn Pinkney
- Designer: Jeremy Russo
- Programmer: Thomas Gawrys
- Artists: Barclay Chantel; Lee Harker
- Composer: Lorne Balfe
- Series: Skylanders
- Engine: Vicarious Visions Alchemy
- Platforms: iOS; Nintendo 3DS; PlayStation 3; PlayStation 4; Wii; Wii U; Xbox 360; Xbox One
- Release: NA: September 20, 2015; AU: September 24, 2015; EU: September 25, 2015
- Genres: Role-playing, platform, racing
- Modes: Single-player, multiplayer

Skylanders: SuperChargers is a 2015 role-playing platform video game developed by Vicarious Visions and Beenox and published by Activision. The fifth installment of the Skylanders series, it was released on September 20, 2015, for PlayStation 3, PlayStation 4, Wii U, Xbox 360, Xbox One, and was released on October 25, 2015, for iOS. Skylanders: SuperChargers Racing was released as a standalone title for Wii and the Nintendo 3DS on the same date, which only features the game's racing mode. A sequel, Skylanders: Imaginators, was released in October 2016.

== Gameplay ==
Like its predecessors, Skylanders: SuperChargers is a "toy-to-life" video game in which players place toy figurines on the "Portal of Power", allowing them to play as the represented character in-game. The game introduces a redesigned "Portal of Power" with a larger and wider surface to accommodate vehicles, which are larger than typical characters. SuperChargers introduces vehicles, which are divided into three classes; land, sea, and sky. Ground vehicles and water vehicles allow players to race on land or underwater on several different tracks, while the sky vehicles can be accelerated and decelerated and feature an "autopilot system" that can automatically guide players to their destination.

Each track is filled with obstacles, which players must evade, and have alternate routes which can help them reach the finish line faster. Players must defeat a boss before they reach the finish line and must solve a puzzle before they proceed. Players can also collect parts for vehicles to upgrade them through a customization screen that automatically opens up after collecting a part. The player can also purchase mods to upgrade the vehicle using "Gearbits", which can be earned through completing missions and stages. Each character has their own matching vehicles, and using the correct combination causes the character to enter a "Supercharged" state, which grants the vehicle additional abilities. The 117 characters introduced in the series since Skylanders: Spyro's Adventure are still playable in SuperChargers, but the game only includes 20 new figurines, due to the inclusion of vehicles. Returning characters, such as Stealth Elf and Trigger Happy, are reimagined with new abilities and upgrade trees. Additionally, the Nintendo console versions feature guest appearances from Donkey Kong and Bowser of the Mario franchise, with their figures doubling as Amiibo figures for other games.

The game can also be played cooperatively with another player. Only one vehicle can be used, with one player driving while the other one defends against threats.

The Skystones minigame returns, with traps collected in Skylanders: Trap Team adding a unique Skystone to play. As per previous iterations, a Starter Pack including a portal is available in shops, but consumers can download the title at a cheaper price and use their existing portal from Skylanders: Trap Team.

== Synopsis ==
=== Characters ===
Skylanders: SuperChargers introduces twenty matching pairs of vehicles and SuperChargers, as well as variant figures of Skylanders and vehicles. There are also trophies that allow the players to race as villains, which come in racing action packs. A Kaos trophy is included in the dark edition of the game's starter pack. The Wii, Wii U, and 3DS versions feature Bowser and Donkey Kong as playable characters, who are playable in the Wii U and Switch versions of Skylanders: Imaginators.

=== Plot ===
Kaos tells the player, the "Portal Master", that he has captured Master Eon, Flynn, Cali, and Hugo and gained control of the portals, allowing him to sever their connection to the Skylands. However, Hugo manages to get through to the Portal Master and restore their portal connection. The Skylanders infiltrate Count Moneybone's transport ship and free Cali, Flynn, and Hugo, who tell them that there are other prisoners who must be freed. After escaping, Flynn, Cali, and Hugo see a contraption that is "eating the sky" and receive a message from Eon, informing them that he has been captured and Kaos has used the Darkness to construct the Sky Eater. To combat it, a special team of Skylanders called the SuperChargers are assembled, who ride special rift engines utilizing the portal technology.

At Motley Meadows, the Skylanders find that the Sky Eater is attacking and must rescue the inhabitants. After gaining control of the lead ship and rescuing the prisoners, they return to Skylanders Academy. The Skylanders then head to the Cloudscraper Mountains to seek out the Cloudbreather Dragon, who can track anything or anyone's location, but Kaos' forces have taken over and attempt to kidnap the Dragon. However, the Superchargers stop them. and the Cloudbreather Dragon tells them that Eon is currently trapped in the Land of the Undead. To get there, they must upgrade the Rift Engines using the Thunderous Bolt from Cloud Kingdom. Upon arrival, Lord Stratosfear has taken over, but the Skylanders take down his transport ships and defeat him, allowing them to obtain the Bolts.

As they fight their way through the prison and free prisoners, Count Moneybone is defeated and Eon is freed. Kaos learns of this, but before he can act, the Darkness becomes sentient and begins guiding him. Eon tells the Superchargers they must defeat the Darkness by learning how the Ancients previously defeated it; however, the only record of this is in the Spell Punk Library, which only a Spell Punk can navigate. The Superchargers then head to the Spell Punk Library, where they learn that a super-powerful Rift Engine called "The Dark Rift Engine" let The Darkness into Skylands, and that the Core of Light was previously developed as a weapon against it but was never completed. They decide to seek out author Pomfrey Le Fuzzbottom to learn how to complete the Core of Light.

At the Sky Eater, the Darkness convinces Kaos to rule over the universe, not just Skylands. Although Glumshanks tries to talk Kaos out of it, the Darkness convinces him to fire Glumshanks, and he flees to Skylanders Academy. The Superchargers head to Gladfly Glades and meet Fuzzbottom, who tells them that the last part of the Core of Light is the Eye of the Ancients, which is currently being held by a Lobster Titan, and the only way to match its power is to use the Kolossal Kernel, which is in the possession of Cap'n Cluck. The Superchargers defeat Cluck and use the Kolossal Kernel to defeat the Lobster Titan, gaining the Eye of the Ancients.

Mags then completes the Core of Light, but the Darkness warns Kaos of this and he attacks Skylanders Academy; in the process, the Core of Light is destroyed and Glumshanks seemingly sacrifices himself so the Superchargers can escape, but is later revealed to be alive. Eon proposes that the Superchargers use the Dark Rift Engine to stop the Darkness, and Glumshanks tells them that it is likely located at the Vault of the Ancients.

When they return, Sky Pirates attack and kidnap Mags, intending to use her to escape the collapsing Skylands. Meanwhile, Kaos realizes that he no longer wants to destroy the Skylands, as this would ruin his dream of ruling it. He confronts the Darkness about this, but after it threatens to take away his powers, he opens a Mega Rift to destroy all of Skylands.

The Superchargers, Flynn, Cali, and Glumshanks attack the Sky Eater and reach Kaos' throne room, where he attacks them with the full power of the Darkness but is defeated. Afterwards, he gets fed up with the Darkness telling him what to do and escapes with the Superchargers and their allies. The Darkness then re-opens the Rift and dons the Sky Eater's remains as armor, but is ultimately defeated. Kaos then joins the Academy as a consultant until he can regain his powers.

== Development ==
A new Skylanders video game was confirmed by publisher Activision on February 5, 2015. The inclusion of vehicles and the game's title was leaked on May 26, 2015, ahead of its official reveal on June 3, 2015.

=== Skylanders: SuperChargers Racing ===
The racing elements of the full game were developed by Beenox. The Nintendo 3DS and Wii versions only feature this racing portion, because porting the full current-generation game was considered "a big challenge" and game director Maxime Montcalm said that "nobody could do it". In the adventure mode, all of Skylands compete in a Grand Prix sponsored by Pandergast for the Snow Globe of Destiny which will grant the winner one wish. SuperChargers Racing is the final Skylanders installment to be released on the Wii and Nintendo 3DS.

== Reception ==
Reception

Aggregate score
Aggregator	Score
Metacritic	WIIU: 87/100; PS4: 81/100; XONE: 76/100 iOS: 88/100

Review scores
Publication	Score
Destructoid	8.5/10
Game Informer	6.5/10
GameRevolution	8/10
GameSpot	8/10
GamesRadar+	3/5
Hardcore Gamer	4/5
IGN	8/10
Nintendo Life	9/10
Nintendo World Report	9/10
Pocket Gamer	iOS: 4/5
Polygon	8.5/10
Shacknews	7/10
The Guardian	4/5
TouchArcade	iOS: 4.5/5
USgamer	4/5
VentureBeat	80/100
VideoGamer.com	7/10

Skylanders: SuperChargers received "generally favorable" reviews according to review aggregator website Metacritic. The scores from Metacritic had some scores that were higher than the previous game, such as the Wii U and PlayStation 4 versions, but some were lower than the previous game, such as the iOS and Xbox One versions. Despite its positive reception, Activision reported in February 2016 that the game did not meet sales expectations.

=== Awards ===
List of awards and nominations
Award	Category	Result	Ref.
The Game Awards 2015	Best Family Game	Nominated	
2016 Kids' Choice Awards	Favorite Video Game	Nominated	
