= Skylanders: Trap Team =

2014 video game

- Developers: Toys for Bob; Beenox; Vicarious Visions (iOS, Android)
- Publisher: Activision
- Producers: Dawn Pinkney; Chris Wilson
- Artists: Terry Falls; Lee Harker
- Writer: Alex Ness
- Composer: Lorne Balfe
- Series: Skylanders
- Engine: Vicarious Visions Alchemy
- Platforms: Android; iOS; Nintendo 3DS; PlayStation 3; PlayStation 4; Wii; Wii U; Xbox 360; Xbox One
- Release: AU: October 2, 2014; NA: October 5, 2014; EU: October 10, 2014
- Genres: Role-playing, Platform
- Modes: Single-player, multiplayer

Skylanders: Trap Team is a 2014 3D platform game developed by Toys for Bob and Beenox and published by Activision. It is the fourth installment in the Skylanders video game franchise and was released on October 2, 2014, in Australasia, October 5, 2014 in North America, and October 10, 2014, in Europe, for release on Android and iOS mobile platforms, PlayStation 3, PlayStation 4, Wii, Wii U, Xbox 360, Xbox One, and Nintendo 3DS. It is the sequel to Skylanders: Swap Force, and features the voices of Fred Tatasciore, Billy West, John DiMaggio, Matthew Moy, Laura Bailey, Alex Ness, John Paul Karliak, Matthew Yang King, and Richard Steven Horvitz.

Skylanders: Trap Team utilizes a near-field communication reader platform, called the Traptanium Portal, that reads NFC chips located on the bottom of figurines. The figurines are then used in-game as playable characters. It introduces a new group of Skylanders called the "Trap Masters", who work with the Portal Master to capture the criminals that Kaos has released from Cloudcracker Prison, which holds the most feared villains of Skylands. It also introduces playable villain characters that can be captured using new trap figures after they have been defeated.

A sequel, Skylanders: SuperChargers, was released in September 2015.

== Synopsis ==
Kaos has blown up Cloudcracker Prison, creating the new elements of Light and Dark and freeing the Doom Raiders, the most notorious villains in Skylands, led by the Golden Queen and her cohorts The Gulper, Chompy Mage, Chef Pepper Jack, Dreamcatcher, Dr. Krankcase, and Wolfgang. With help from the Trap Masters and using Traptanium, a magic material that can harness the power of the elements, the Skylanders must round up and trap the villains, who can fight for them.

== Plot ==
=== Main console/tablet versions ===
A long time ago, a powerful team of villains called the Doom Raiders hid out in the Savage Badlands and wreaked havoc over Skylands. Eventually, a group of elite Skylanders called the Trap Team captured and locked them up inside Cloudcracker Prison.

Some years later, Kaos releases the Doom Raiders (consisting of Golden Queen, The Gulper, Chompy Mage, Chef Pepper Jack, Dreamcatcher, Dr. Krankcase, and Wolfgang) and other villains by blowing up the prison. As a result, the Trap Team is sent to Earth along with crystal traps formed from the material Traptanium, which was used to build the prison. While hosting the opening of Skylanders Academy, Buzz witnesses an explosion and goes to investigate. He helps the Trap Team catch the Gulper, a giant blob monster, at Soda Springs by using its addiction to soda. Meanwhile, Kaos gathers with the Doom Raiders at his new lair, but they reject him as a result of his failure to prevent the Gulper's capture. However, the Doom Raiders' leader, Golden Queen, allows Kaos and his troll butler Glumshanks to stay. The Trap Team secures intelligence about the Doom Raiders at Know-It-all Island then heads to Chompy Mountain, where they battle Chompy Mage and his forces and trap him. Meanwhile, Golden Queen learns of the defeat, with Kaos deciding to take advantage of this to retake control.

The Trap Team is sent to track down Chef Pepper Jack and stop him from stealing the Phoenix Chicken and obtaining an egg to create a Spicy Omelet of Doom. Kaos intervenes to foil his plans, but this allows him to escape with the egg. The Trap Team launches an assault on his Zeppelin and traps Chef Pepper Jack. The remaining Doom Raiders are set to take action, but Golden Queen still wants to build a weapon made of Traptanium in an attempt to get all the gold in Skylands, much to Kaos' dismay. Realizing he will need the help of the Skylanders, Kaos decides to aid them in getting revenge, revealing that one of the Doom Raiders, the Dreamcatcher, has been terrorizing a Mabu village in Monster Marsh. The Trap Team heads to Telescope Towers to stop her from stealing the secrets of Traptanium from the dreams of Mabu scientists. Although they defeat and trap her, she manages to send the secrets to the Doom Raiders.

Despite this, mad scientist Dr. Krankcase still needs one final piece to complete the Doom Raiders' ultimate weapon: a large amount of "stinkocity", or any form of strong odor. He accumulates this level of stinkocity from the Secret Sewers of Supreme Stink, which contain a supply of odorous green goo. While the Skylanders are able to arrive at the sewers and stop the main flow of goo, Dr. Krankcase replaces the goo with cheese and plans to bury it and travel forward in time to when it will rot, though time travel requires a Portal Master. To do so, they reopen Kaos's Wilikin workshop and trap him, but Wolfgang abandons Krankcase and leaves him to be trapped by the Trap Team. They track Wolfgang to Time Town, but when they arrive, he has already traveled to and taken over the far future, constructing "The Big Bad Wolfer", a giant speaker that amplifies his music. The Trap Team shuts down the Big Bad Wolfer and defeats Wolfgang, but the rotten cheese is sent to Golden Queen in the present and she completes the ultimate weapon. She demands the release of her fellow Doom Raiders, the surrender of the Trap Team, and all the gold in the world.

The Trap Team steals a rocket from the Trolls and uses it to get to the Skyhighlands, where they find a crystal to locate the Golden Queen's lair and defeat her. However, Kaos takes the weapon for himself and absorbs the combined "stinkocity" and energy from the collected Traptanium to become much stronger. Having gained the power to connect with the human world, he realizes he does not need to defeat the Skylanders, but rather the Portal Master, or the player, and sets his sights on Earth. With both worlds hanging in the balance, the Trap Team makes their way through the weapon and battles Kaos, who is defeated and put in a special Kaos Trap. The game ends with official opening of the Skylander Academy.

=== 3DS version ===
In the Eternal Archives, Hugo reads The Most Boring Book Ever and unwittingly opens a portal to The Realm of Dreams, allowing Nightmare creatures to escape along with their master The Dream Sheep and his sidekick The Sleep Dragon. Dream Sheep casts a sleep spell which puts all of Skylands to sleep, allowing his minions to wreak havoc. The Skylanders and the Trap Masters are immune to the sleep spell, and must trap all of the nightmare villains and stop Dream Sheep.

== Gameplay ==
As in previous games, the player controls various characters by placing toy figures representing them onto a near field communication-enabled interface device called the Traptanium Portal, which activates the character in the game. Trap Team adds the trap, a new type of item which, unlike the figures, which bring characters into the game, can be used to store forty-seven Villains and control them as playable characters who are more powerful than Skylanders. These stored characters can be taken to other consoles. The Traptanium Portal has a speaker incorporated in its design to emphasize the trapping mechanic; when enemies are "trapped", their vocals travel from a screen to the portal. The game features Skystones Smash, a mini-game that is the successor to Skystones from Skylanders: Giants. It is a number-based card game played in a tabletop style.

Trap Team introduces Trap Masters, special Skylanders that are stronger against trappable villains, as well as Skylanders Minis, miniature versions of regular Skylanders. Players can switch between playing as a villain and a Skylander at any point in the game. In co-operative play, players can share the trapped villain and take turns playing as it. However, there is a time limit to how long a villain can be used, which is shortened when player using the villain is hit by attacks. Once the playable villain's energy is depleted, players must wait until their energy recharges before they can use them again. There are also hidden quests involving villains, which unlock exclusive upgrades upon completion. Villains can also be stored in the Villain Vault, which is located in the game's hub world.

The mobile version of Trap Team uses a bluetooth Traptanium Portal and optional touch controls. If the Traptanium Portal is not connected, players can use "on the go characters", digital versions of the figurines stored on the device.

Trap Team also introduces the new elements of Light and Dark, with Knight Light and Spotlight for Light and Knight Mare and Blackout for Dark. Areas only accessible by Skylanders of these elements, as well as Villains of these elements, are labeled to be of an "Unknown Element" and cannot be visited or trapped, respectively, until a Light or Dark Skylander or Trap is placed on the Portal of Power.

== Characters ==
Skylanders: Trap Team introduces 18 new Trap Master Skylanders, 18 new core Skylanders, 46 trappable villains, and sixteen new mini Skylanders. It also includes five reposed core Skylanders from previous games, and 8 Eon's Elite Skylanders with shiny finishes.

== Development ==
On April 23, 2014, Activision announced Skylanders: Trap Team for release on October 5, 2014.

== Release ==
Skylanders: Trap Team was released on October 2, 2014, in Australia, October 5, 2014 in North America, and October 10, 2014, in Europe, for release on Android, iOS, PlayStation 3, PlayStation 4, Wii, Wii U, Xbox 360, Xbox One and Nintendo 3DS.

In addition to the regular Starter Pack released for all gaming consoles (which includes Food Fight and Snap Shot, two Traps, sticker sheets and trading cards), a Dark Edition Starter Pack was also released, and included the Ultimate Kaos Trap, a dark version of Snap Shot, Dark Wildfire, Dark Food Fight, a two-sided collector's poster, sticker sheets, two additional traps, and trading cards.

The Nintendo 3DS Starter Pack came with Gusto and Barkley, without any traps, as the trapping mechanic is integrated differently.

The Tablet Starter Pack, for Android and iOS devices, comes with a Bluetooth Traptanium Portal, a controller and everything that is included in the Starter Pack from game consoles.

The Wii version contains a free download code for the Wii U version of the game, which is not available on the Nintendo eShop otherwise.

== Reception ==
Reception

Aggregate score
Aggregator	Score
Metacritic	WIIU: 86/100; XONE: 78/100; PS4: 78/100 iOS: 90/100

Review scores
Publication	Score
Destructoid	7.5/10
Game Informer	8.75/10
GameRevolution	6/10
GameSpot	8/10
GamesRadar+	4/5
Gamezebo	MOB: 5/5
Hardcore Gamer	4/5
IGN	8.2/10
Joystiq	3.5/5
Nintendo Life	8/10
Nintendo World Report	WIIU: 9/10; 3DS: 6/10
Pocket Gamer	MOB: 4.5/5
Polygon	8/10
Push Square	7/10
Shacknews	8/10
The Guardian	4/5
TouchArcade	iOS: 4.5/5
USgamer	4/5
VideoGamer.com	7/10

Skylanders: Trap Team received "generally favorable" reviews for most platforms according to review aggregator website Metacritic; the iOS version received "universal acclaim". Despite the scores from Metacritic being slightly lower than that of the previous game on most platforms, the iOS version received the highest Metacritic score in the series.

During the 18th Annual D.I.C.E. Awards, the Academy of Interactive Arts & Sciences nominated Skylanders: Trap Team for "Family Game of the Year".
