= Skylanders =

Video game series

- Genres: Platform, role-playing
- Developers: Toys For Bob (2011–2016); XPEC Entertainment (2011); Vicarious Visions (2011–2016); n-Space (2012–2013); Beenox (2013–2015); Com2uS (2018, 2020)
- Creator: Toys for Bob
- Composer: Lorne Balfe
- Platforms: Android, iOS, Apple TV, Microsoft Windows, Nintendo 3DS, macOS, PlayStation 3, PlayStation 4, Wii, Wii U, Nintendo Switch, Xbox 360, Xbox One
- First release: Spyro's Adventure; October 13, 2011
- Latest release: Ring of Heroes; December 12, 2018

Skylanders is a toys-to-life action-adventure video game franchise developed by American video game developer Toys for Bob and published by Activision.

Skylanders games are played using NFC-enabled collectible figurines of playable characters, alongside a specially themed NFC reader dubbed the "Portal of Power", which reads and writes data stored on a microchip within the base of the figure. This includes the corresponding character to use during gameplay, as well as ingame upgrades and statistics, allowing figures to retain their game data across different games in the series.

Each Skylander is associated with one of ten elements: Earth, Air, Fire, Water, Magic, Tech, Life, Undead, and later in Skylanders trap team introduced the Light, and Dark. Skylanders of different elements are stronger in certain areas of the game, and can unlock areas of the game hidden behind "Elemental Gates".

== Plot ==
The games take place in the Skylands, a realm of floating islands located at the center of the universe that is often threatened by evil forces who seek to rule it and gain access to all worlds. For generations, a band of heroes known as the Skylanders, among whom include the purple dragon Spyro, have worked with the Portal Masters to defend Skylands from evil and protect the Core of Light.

Preceding the events of each game, the Skylanders are sent away from their home world to Earth, becoming frozen in the process due to the lack of magic in the 'human world'. In most games, they are mistaken for toys in this state, causing them to be sold at toy stores.

The player(s) take on the role of a Portal Master, utilizing the Portal of Power to send the Skylanders back to their home so that they may battle against the Dark Portal Master Kaos, a recurring villain in the series, as well as his army and other recurring villains.

== Games ==
Release timeline
2011	Spyro's Adventure
2011	Universe
2012	Cloud Patrol
2012	Lost Islands
2012	Battlegrounds
2012	Giants
2013	Swap Force
2014	Trap Team
2015	SuperChargers
2016	Battlecast
2016	Imaginators
2016	Creator
2017
2018	Ring Of Heroes

=== Spyro's Adventure (2011) ===
Spyro's Adventure is the first game in the series and features 32 Skylanders, four for each of the eight elements. The Skylanders seek to restore the Core of Light, which Kaos destroyed, by collecting the Eternal Sources of each element and other components.

=== Giants (2012) ===
Giants is the second installment in the series and a direct sequel to Spyro's Adventure. It introduces a new team of Skylanders called the Giants; canonically the first Skylanders who are larger than normal Skylanders. The Giants were assembled to stop the robotic Arkeyans' reign and are large and strong enough to lift, throw, and destroy trees and rocks, as well as being able to break walls that can normally only be destroyed with bombs. They must stop Kaos after he reactivates the Arkeyan Conquertron and attempts to take over Skylands by resurrecting the Arkeyans.

=== Swap Force (2013) ===
Swap Force is the third installment in the franchise and takes place in another part of Skylands called the Cloudbreak Islands. It introduces a new group of Skylanders called the Swap Force, who have the ability to swap their top and bottom halves to mix and match abilities. Together, the Swap Force and the Skylanders fight to prevent Kaos and his mother from ruining the magic restoring performance of the Elementals on Mount Cloudbreak.

=== Trap Team (2014) ===
Trap Team is the fourth installment in the franchise. It introduces two new elements, the Light and Dark elements, as well as a new group of Skylanders called the Trap Masters, who wield powerful weapons made of Traptanium, the strongest material ever discovered in Skylands. They were charged with guarding the dangerous inmates of Cloudcracker Prison until Kaos busted them out. Trap Team also features the new trap mechanic, allowing players to trap specific in-game enemies in Elemental Traps, which are shards of Traptanium from Cloudcracker Prison. The trapped enemies can then be summoned as playable characters for a limited time. The Skylanders and their trapped foes fight together to stop Kaos and the Doom Raiders.

=== SuperChargers (2015) ===
SuperChargers is the fifth installment in the series. It introduces a new group of Skylanders called the SuperChargers, who pilot special vehicles of the Land, Sky and Sea. The Skylanders must stop Kaos and his Sky Eater, as well as The Darkness, which has its own plans. SuperChargers also featured a multiplayer racing game mode similar to the Mario Kart games, which can be played online or via local multiplayer. The Wii and the Nintendo 3DS received a distinct new game, titled SuperChargers Racing, that focused exclusively on the racing mode.

=== Imaginators (2016) ===
Imaginators is the sixth and currently final main installment in the series, which was developed by Toys for Bob. It was released on October 13, 2016, in Australia and New Zealand, on October 14, 2016, in Europe and on October 16, 2016, in North America. It was the only game in the series released for the Nintendo Switch and did not require a portal of power. It introduced two new kinds of Skylanders, the Imaginators and the Senseis. The Imaginators are player created characters with a customizable look and ability set. The Skylanders must stop Kaos, who, with the help of Brain, is using Mind Magic to create his own evil Skylanders called Doomlanders. Crash Bandicoot and Doctor Neo Cortex make guest appearances as playable characters, marking their first appearance in a video game since Crash Bandicoot Nitro Kart 2 in 2010. Their figures were initially exclusive to the PlayStation 3 and PlayStation 4 starter packs, but were later released as a stand-alone double pack.

=== Spin-offs ===
In 2011, Activision released Skylanders Universe, an online browser-based multiplayer game that allowed players to interact in Skylands, play minigames, customize their own island, and log their Skylanders collection. Players could connect their portals to their computer to summon their Skylanders, like in the core series. The service was discontinued on April 29, 2013.

Activision released spin-off games on mobile devices, including Cloud Patrol, Battlegrounds, Lost Islands, Collection Vault, mobile ports of Trap Team and SuperChargers, Battlecast, and Ring of Heroes.

== Characters ==
=== Skylanders ===
There are a total of 144 playable Skylanders. They are arranged by their game of debut, with some being in special groups.

==== Core Skylanders ====
===== Debuting in Skylanders: Spyro's Adventure =====
- Spyro (voiced by Josh Keaton in the first five games, Matthew Mercer in Skylanders: Imaginators) is a purple dragon of the Magic element and a legendary Core Skylander. He first appeared in the titular franchise.
- Bash (voiced by Keith Silverstein) is a rock dragon of the Earth element.
- Boomer (voiced by Joey Camen) is a dynamite-throwing troll of the Tech element.
- Camo (voiced by André Sogliuzzo) is a plant dragon of the Life element.
- Chop Chop (voiced by David Lodge) is an Arkeyan skeleton knight of the Undead element.
- Cynder (voiced by Tobie LaSalandra) is a violet dragon of the Undead element. She first appeared in The Legend of Spyro trilogy.
- Dino-Rang (voiced by Keith Silverstein) is a boomerang-wielding dinosaur of the Earth element.
- Double Trouble (voiced by Alex Ness) is a tiki-masked sorcerer of the Magic element.
- Drill Sergeant (voiced by Thomas Bromhead) is an Arkeyan drill machine of the Tech element.
- Drobot (voiced by Alex Ness) is a dragon of the Tech element who wears a robotic suit.
- Eruptor (voiced by Keythe Farley) is a lava monster of the Fire element. In Skylanders: SuperChargers, he is known as Lava Lance Eruptor and is the driver of the Burn-Cycle.
- Flameslinger (voiced by Keith Szarabajka) is an elf archer of the Fire element.
- Ghost Roaster (voiced by John Kassir) is a skeletal ghost-eating ghoul of the Undead element.
- Gill Grunt (voiced by Darin De Paul) is a harpoon gun-wielding "gill-man" of the Water element. In Skylanders: SuperChargers, he is known as Deep Dive Gill Grunt and is the pilot of the Reef Ripper.
- Hex (voiced by Courtenay Taylor) is an undead elf of the Undead element.
- Ignitor (voiced by Dwight Schultz) is a fire spirit knight of the Fire element.
- Lightning Rod (voiced by Alex Ness) is a storm giant of the Air element.
- Prism Break (voiced by Peter Lurie) is a crystal rock golem of the Earth element.
- Slam Bam (voiced by Fred Tatasciore) is a four-armed yeti of the Water element.
- Sonic Boom (voiced by Lani Minella) is a griffin of the Air element.
- Stealth Elf (voiced by Audrey Wasilewski) is an elf ninja of the Life element. In Skylanders: SuperChargers, she is known as Super Shot Stealth Elf and is the pilot of the Stealth Stinger.
- Stump Smash (voiced by Kevin Michael Richardson) is an ent of the Life element with mallet-shaped hands.
- Sunburn (voiced by Troy Baker) is a dragon/phoenix hybrid of the Fire element.
- Terrafin (voiced by Joey Camen) is a dirt shark of the Earth element. In Skylanders: SuperChargers, he is known as Shark Shooter Terrafin and is the driver of the Shark Tank.
- Trigger Happy (voiced by Dave Wittenberg) is a gold gun-wielding gremlin of the Tech element. In Skylanders: SuperChargers, he is known as Double Dare Trigger Happy and is the driver of the Gold Rusher.
- Voodood (voiced by André Sogliuzzo) is an orc of the Magic element.
- Warnado (voiced by Fred Tatasciore) is a turtle of the Air element.
- Wham-Shell (voiced by Chris Parson) is a crab of the Water element.
- Whirlwind (voiced by Salli Saffioti) is a dragon/unicorn hybrid of the Air element.
- Wrecking Ball (voiced by Ryan Cooper) is a grub worm of the Magic element.
- Zap (voiced by Jeff Bergman) is a water dragon of the Water element who was raised by electric eels.
- Zook (voiced by Fred Tatasciore) is a bamabazooker of the Life element who wields a bamboo-made bazooka.

===== Debuting in Skylanders Giants =====
- Chill (voiced by Julie Nathanson) is an unspecified humanoid of the Water element.
- Flashwing (voiced by Tara Strong) is a crystal dragon of the Earth element.
- Fright Rider (voiced by Yuri Lowenthal) is an undead elf jouster of the Undead element who rides a skeletal ostrich.
- Hot Dog (voiced by Carlos Alazraqui) is a fire dog of the Fire element.
- Jet-Vac (voiced by Greg Ellis) is a bird-like sky baron of the Air element who wields a powerful vacuum device. In Skylanders: SuperChargers, he is known as Hurricane Jet-Vac and is the pilot of the Jet Stream.
- Pop Fizz (voiced by Bobcat Goldthwait) is a gremlin alchemist of the Magic element who drinks a potion that turns him into a stronger form. In Skylanders: SuperChargers, he is known as Big Bubble Pop Fizz and is the pilot of the Soda Skimmer.
- Shroomboom (voiced by Matthew Moy) is a one-eyed agaric mushroom of the Life element who wields a slingshot.
- Sprocket (voiced by Elizabeth Daily) is a goldling of the Tech element.

===== Debuting in Skylanders SWAP Force =====
- Bumble Blast (voiced by David Sobolov) is an anthropomorphic beehive of the Life element.
- Countdown (voiced by Richard Tatum) is an anthropomorphic bomb of the Tech element.
- Dune Bug (voiced by Nolan North) is a rhinoceros beetle of the Magic element.
- Fryno (voiced by Robert Cait) is a fire rhinoceros of the Fire element.
- Grim Creeper (voiced by Lex Lang) is a ghost of the Undead element.
- Pop Thorn (voiced by Chris Edgerly) is a pufferthorn of the Air element.
- Punk Shock (voiced by Tara Platt) is an electric eel of the Water element.
- Rip Tide (voiced by Patrick Seitz) is a humanoid fish of the Water element.
- Roller Brawl (voiced by Cree Summer) is a vampire roller derby player of the Undead element. In Skylanders: SuperChargers, she is known as Bone Bash Roller Brawl and is the driver of the Tomb Buggy.
- Scorp (voiced by Rino Romano) is a scorpion of the Earth element.
- Scratch (voiced by Kat Cressida) is a feathercat of the Air element.
- Slobber Tooth (voiced by Dave Fennoy) is a turtle dinosaur of the Earth element.
- Smolderdash (voiced by Grey DeLisle) is a fire spirit of the Fire element.
- Star Strike (voiced by Misty Lee) is an alien of the Magic element.
- Wind Up (voiced by Bob Bergen) is wind-up toy robot of the Tech element.
- Zoo Lou (voiced by Gideon Emery) is a bear of the Life element.

===== Debuting in Skylanders Trap Team =====
- Bat Spin (voiced by Eliza Schneider) is a vampire of the Undead element.
- Blackout (voiced by Brian Bloom) is a black dragon of the Dark element.
- Blades (voiced by Robin Atkin Downes) is a knight-armored dragon of the Air element.
- Cobra Cadabra (voiced by Sunil Malhotra) is a king cobra of the Magic element who travels in his own basket.
- Chopper (voiced by Dave B. Mitchell) is a small Tyrannosaurus of the Tech element who rides around in the Gyro-Dino-Exo-Suit.
- Déjà Vu (voiced by Betsy Foldes) is an unspecified humanoid of the Magic element.
- Echo (voiced by Kimberly Brooks) is a water dragon of the Water element with seahorse-like traits.
- Fist Bump (voiced by Travis Willingham) is a rock panda of the Earth element.
- Fling Kong (voiced by Nick Shakoour) is a monkey of the Air element.
- Flip Wreck (voiced by Jess Harnell) is a bottlenose dolphin of the Water element.
- Food Fight (voiced by Billy West) is an anthropomorphic artichoke of the Life element that wields a tomato launcher.
- Funny Bone (voiced by Scott Whyte) is a skeletal dog of the Undead element.
- High Five (voiced by Tom Kenny) is a dragon/dragonfly hybrid of the Life element.
- Rocky Roll (voiced by Billy West) is a rock digger and living boulder duo of the Earth element.
- Spotlight (voiced by Misty Lee) is a dragon of the Light element.
- Torch (voiced by Salli Saffioti) is an unspecified fire-haired humanoid of the Fire element.
- Trail Blazer (voiced by Yuri Lowenthal) is a fire unicorn of the Fire element.
- Tread Head (voiced by Sean Schemmel) is an unspecified short creature of the Tech element who rides a tread-covered motorcycle.

==== Giants ====
The Giants are Skylanders from 10,000 years in the past who are larger than the normal Skylanders and use their immense strength to their advantage.

- Tree Rex (voiced by Kevin Michael Richardson) is a giant ent of the Life element and leader of the Giant Skylanders.
- Bouncer (voiced by Bumper Robinson) is a giant robot of the Tech element.
- Crusher (voiced by Kevin Sorbo) is a giant rock golem of the Earth element who wields a stone hammer.
- Eye-Brawl (voiced by Travis Willingham) is a flying eyeball and headless giant duo of the Undead element who have a symbolic relationship.
- Hot Head (voiced by Patrick Seitz) is a giant fire golem of the Fire element.
- Ninjini (voiced by Laura Bailey) is a giant elf genie of the Magic element who is an expert at ninjitsu.
- Swarm (voiced by Danny Jacobs) is a giant insectoid hornet of the Air element.
- Thumpback (voiced by Dan Neil) is a giant baleen whale/toothed whale-like behemoth of the Water element.

==== SWAP Force ====
The SWAP Force are Skylanders who gained the ability to exchange halves of their bodies with each other after being caught in the eruption of a magical volcano.

- Blast Zone (voiced by Jess Harnell) is a furnace knight of the Fire element and one of the leaders of the SWAP Force.
- Wash Buckler (voiced by John DiMaggio) is a Mermasquid of the Water element and one of the leaders of the SWAP Force.
- Boom Jet (voiced by Roger Craig Smith) is an unspecified sky surfer of the Air element.
- Doom Stone (voiced by Travis Willingham) is a stone statue of the Earth element with a tornado-shaped spiral for legs.
- Fire Kraken (voiced by Billy West) is a Chinese dragon of the Fire element.
- Free Ranger (voiced by Joey Camen) is a storm chicken of the Air element.
- Freeze Blade (voiced by Billy West) is an ice feline of the Water element who specializes in ice skating.
- Grilla Drilla (voiced by Chris Fries) is a primate-like Drilla of the Life element that can form a drill using his legs.
- Hoot Loop (voiced by Robin Atkin Downes) is a magic owl of the Magic element.
- Magna Charge (voiced by Gregg Berger) is an Ultron robot of the Tech element.
- Night Shift (voiced by Maurice LaMarche) is a vampire boxer of the Undead element.
- Rattle Shake (voiced by Troy Baker) is a rattlesnake cowboy of the Undead element.
- Rubble Rouser (voiced by Jake Eberle) is an armored rock golem of the Earth element.
- Spy Rise (voiced by JB Blanc) is a robot of the Tech element with spider-like legs.
- Stink Bomb (voiced by Tom Kenny) is a mutant skunk of the Life element.
- Trap Shadow (voiced by Marc Worden) is a panther of the Magic element.

==== Trap Team ====
The Trap Team are Skylanders who catch and imprison villains in Cloudcracker Prison and wield crystal weapons made of a powerful substance known as Traptanium.

- Snap Shot (voiced by Fred Tatasciore) is a Crocagator of the Water element and leader of the Trap Team who wields a Traptanium bow and arrow.
- Blastermind (voiced by Wally Wingert) is an alien of the Magic element who wears a Traptanium helmet.
- Bushwhack (voiced by Roger Craig Smith) is a tree elf of the Life element who wields a Traptanium axe.
- Enigma (voiced by Steve Blum) is an unspecified creature of the Magic element whose face is concealed by his cloak and wields a Traptanium staff.
- Gearshift (voiced by Susan Eisenberg) is a robot of the Tech element who wields a Traptanium gear.
- Gusto (voiced by Jess Harnell) is an unspecified humanoid of the Air element who wields a Traptanium boomerang.
- Head Rush (voiced by Audrey Wasilewski) is an elf of the Earth element who wears a Viking helmet with Traptanium horns.
- Jawbreaker (voiced by Ike Amadi) is a robot of the Tech element equipped with Traptanium fists.
- Ka-Boom (voiced by Dave Burchell) is an unspecified red-skinned humanoid of the Fire element who wields a Traptanium cannon.
- Knight Light (voiced by Josh Keaton) is an unspecified winged humanoid of the Light element who wields a Traptanium scimitar.
- Knight Mare (voiced by Courtenay Taylor) is a dark centaur of the Dark element who wields a Traptanium lance.
- Krypt King (voiced by David Sobolov) is an Arkeyan armor of the Undead element that is possessed by the spirit of a knight and wields a Traptanium broadsword.
- Lob-Star (voiced by Kevin Schon) is a lobster of the Water element who wields Traptanium shurikens.
- Short Cut (voiced by John Kassir) is a short unspecified humanoid of the Undead element who wields a giant pair of Traptanium scissors.
- Thunderbolt (voiced by Jonathan Adams) is an unspecified cloud creature of the Air element who wields a Traptanium sword.
- Tuff Luck (voiced by Marcella Lentz-Pope) is a caracal of the Life element who wields Traptanium warblades.
- Wallop (voiced by John DiMaggio) is a bear-like creature of the Earth element and the best friend of Snap Shot who wields two Traptanium hammers.
- Wildfire (voiced by Keythe Farley) is a golden lion of the Fire element who wields a Traptanium shield.

==== SuperChargers ====
The SuperChargers are Skylanders who pilot their own land, sea, or sky vehicles powered by magical Rift Engines.

- Spitfire (voiced by Diedrich Bader) is a flame spirit of the Fire element, the leader of the SuperChargers, and driver of the Hot Streak.
- Astroblast (voiced by Neal McDonough) is an unspecified crystalline humanoid of the Light element who flies the Sun Runner.
- Dive-Clops (voiced by Maurice LaMarche) is a flying eyeball of the Water element in an atmospheric diving suit, the twin brother of Eye-Brawl's eye half, and pilot of the Dive Bomber.
- Fiesta (voiced by Carlos Alazraqui) is a calaca of the Undead element and driver of the Crypt Crusher.
- Hammer Slam Bowser (voiced by Kenneth W. James) is a Koopa of the Fire element, main antagonist of the Mario franchise, and pilot of the Clown Cruiser. He can be used as both a Skylander and an amiibo. Hammer Slam Bowser wields a hammer and is only playable on Nintendo consoles.
- High Volt (voiced by Josh Duhamel) is a robot of the Tech element and driver of the Shield Striker.
- Nightfall (voiced by Nika Futterman) is a dreadwalker of the Dark element and pilot of the Sea Shadow.
- Smash Hit (voiced by Rob Paulsen) is a warsupial of the Earth element and driver of the Thump Truck.
- Splat (voiced by Brittany Snow) is a faun of the Magic element and pilot of the Splatter Splasher.
- Stormblade (voiced by Stephanie Lemelin) is a lark of the Air element and pilot of the Sky Slicer.
- Thrillipede (voiced by Patrick Seitz) is a millipede of the Life element and pilot of the Buzz Wing.
- Turbo Charge Donkey Kong (voiced by Takashi Nagasako) is a Kong of the Life element, main protagonist of the Donkey Kong franchise, and driver of the Barrel Blaster. He can be used as both a Skylander and an amiibo. Turbo Charge Donkey Kong wields an indestructible barrel and is only playable on Nintendo consoles.

==== Senseis ====
The Senseis are Skylanders who mastered different fighting skills and helped to train the Imaginators.

- Air Strike (voiced by Charlie Schlatter) is an unspecified humanoid of the Air element who is accompanied by his blue zephyr falcon Birdie. He specializes in training the Brawler battle class.
- Ambush (voiced by JB Blanc) is a tree knight of the Life element. He specializes in training the Knight battle class.
- Aurora (voiced by Britt Baron) is an unspecified humanoid of the Light element and the niece of Master Eon. She specializes in training the Swashbuckler battle class.
- Barbella (voiced by Cynthia McWilliams) is an unspecified humanoid of the Earth element. She specializes in training the Sentinel battle class.
- Boom Bloom (voiced by Sara Cravens) is a mutant plant of the Life element. She specializes in training the Ninja battle class.
- Buckshot (voiced by Edward Bosco) is a sky-faun of the Magic element. He specializes in training the Bowslinger battle class.
- Chain Reaction (voiced by Charlie Adler) is a robot of the Tech element who wields chainsaw-like swords. He specializes in training the Swashbuckler battle class.
- Chopscotch (voiced by Hynden Walch) is a ghoul of the Undead element. She specializes in training the Smasher battle class.
- Crash Bandicoot (voiced by Jess Harnell) is a mutated bandicoot of the Life element and the main protagonist of the franchise of the same name. He specializes in training the Brawler battle class.
- Dr. Neo Cortex (voiced by Lex Lang) is a human mad scientist of the Tech element and the main antagonist of the Crash Bandicoot franchise. He specializes in training the Sorcerer battle class.
- Ember (voiced by Stephanie Sheh) is an unspecified humanoid samurai of the Fire element. She specializes in training the Sentinel battle class.
- Flare Wolf (voiced by Cameron Bowen) is a fire wolf of the Fire element. He specializes in training the Bazooker battle class.
- King Pen (voiced by Rino Romano) is a penguin of the Water element. He specializes in training the Brawler battle class.
- Mysticat (voiced by Jocelyn Blue) is a sphinx of the Magic element with a centaur-like build. He specializes in training the Sorcerer battle class.
- Pit Boss (voiced by John Kassir) is a pit viper of the Undead element. He specializes in training the Sorcerer battle class.
- Ro-Bow (voiced by Sean Schemmel) is a one-eyed robot archer of the Tech element. He specializes in training the Bowslinger battle class.
- Starcast (voiced by Fred Tatasciore) is a four-armed alien of the Dark element. He specializes in training the Ninja battle class.
- Tidepool (voiced by Moira Quirk) is an unspecified humanoid of the Water element. She specializes in training the Quickshot battle class.
- Tri-Tip (voiced by Brad Abrell) is a Triceratops of the Earth element. He specializes in training the Smasher battle class.
- Wildstorm (voiced by Keston John) is an unspecified humanoid of the Air element. He specializes in training the Knight battle class.

=== Recurring ===
In addition to over 144 playable Skylanders, there are a number of recurring characters throughout the series. The most important of these NPCs, on account of appearing in every game, are:

- Master Eon (voiced by Daniel Hagen) is the previous Portal Master who lost his corporeal form when the Core of Light was destroyed and serves as a guide to the player.
  - Hugo (voiced by Michael Yurchak) is a Mabu who served as Master Eon's assistant.
- Flynn (voiced by Patrick Warburton) is a self-absorbed Mabu pilot who is the captain of the Dread-Yacht.
- Cali (voiced by Sumalee Montano) is a Mabu adventurer.
- Tessa (voiced by Kari Wahlgren) is a fox from Woodburrow who first appears in Skylanders: Swap Force. She served as a guide to Flynn and the Skylanders when they were on the Cloudbreak Islands. By the end of the game, Tessa succeeds the unnamed chieftess. Tessa later appeared in other Skylanders games to help out the Skylanders.
  - Whiskers is a large kestrel who is Tessa's friend. He serves as her mode of transportation ever since she rescued his chick form from some Chompies.
- Buzz (voiced by Travis Willingham) is a Mabu trainer who operates Skylanders Academy as seen in Skylanders: Trap Team. In his podcast series, Skylanders voice actor Alex Ness stated that Buzz is Flynn's father.

=== Villains ===
- Kaos (voiced by Richard Steven Horvitz) is a dark Portal Master and the main villain of the franchise. He is served by an army of Cyclopes, Drow, Spell Punks, and Trolls.
  - Glumshanks (voiced by Chris Cox) is Kaos' troll servant who begrudgingly assists him.
- Arkeyan Conquertron (voiced by George Takei) is an evil giant robot working for the Arkeyans who was reactivated by Kaos in Skylanders: Giants.
- Kaossandra (voiced by Christine Baranski) is a dark Portal master. She is the mother of Kaos whose shadow was first seen in Skylanders: Giants and fully appeared in Skylanders: Swap Force.
- The Doom Raiders are a gang of evil villains who were imprisoned in Cloudcracker Prison until Kaos freed them in Skylanders: Trap Team. In Skylanders: Imaginators, four of its members were offered suspended sentences by Master Eon if they would help train the Imaginators.
  - Golden Queen (voiced by CCH Pounder) is a living gold statue of the Earth element and the leader of the Doom Raiders who can turn anything into gold. In Skylanders: Imaginators, she becomes a Sensei who specializes in training the Sorcerer battle class.
  - Gulper (voiced by Jamieson Price) is a gelatinous blob of the Water element and member of the Doom Raiders from the Gelatinous Caverns with an enormous appetite who can grow to large size upon drinking soda.
  - Chompy Mage (voiced by Alex Ness) is a wizard of the Life element and member of the Doom Raiders who was raised by Chompies. First appearing in Skylanders: Giants, he can summon Chompies and even turn into a giant Chompy. His Chompy hand puppet claims that Chompy Mage hatched from a Chompy pod. In Skylanders: Imaginators, he becomes a Sensei who specializes in training the Bazooker battle class.
  - Chef Pepper Jack (voiced by Darin De Paul) is an anthropomorphic chili pepper of the Fire element, renegade celebrity chef, and member of the Doom Raiders who became rogue when he came across evil recipes. He uses the kitchen-themed Chef Zeppelin as his lair mode of transportation.
  - Dreamcatcher (voiced by Tara Platt) is a floating head of the Air element from the Land of Dreams with dream-manipulation abilities and member of the Doom Raiders. She was previously imprisoned in the Land of Dreams' Lucid Lockdown before escaping both locations and joining the Dream World.
  - Dr. Krankcase (voiced by Quinton Flynn in Skylanders: Trap Team) is an unspecified creature of the Tech element with mechanical legs and member of the Doom Raiders. He is a mad scientist who used a glowing goo to make wood come to life. Dr. Krankcase was credited for creating the wooden Evilikins. In Skylanders: Imaginators, he becomes a Sensei who specializes in training the Quickshot battle class.
  - Luminous (voiced by Liam O'Brien) is an unspecified humanoid of the Light element and member of the Doom Raiders with light-based abilities.
  - Nightshade (voiced by Gavin Hammon) is an unspecified humanoid of the Dark element, a professional ninja/thief with shadow-based abilities, and member of the Doom Raiders.
  - Wolfgang (voiced by J.P. Karliak) is a werewolf guitarist of the Undead element and member of the Doom Raiders. He was originally a human musician before he played the musical note for pain that drove him to becoming a werewolf. In Skylanders: Imaginators, he becomes a Sensei who specializes in training the Bowslinger battle class.
- The Trappable Villains are lesser villains in Skylanders: Trap Team where a few of them work for the Doom Raiders while the others cause trouble on their own. They are mostly foot soldiers, but one can be trappable. Some of them return in Skylanders: Imaginators as Senseis where they were offered the same deal like four of the Doom Raiders.
  - Bad Juju (voiced by Kimberly Brooks) is a skeleton/ghost witch doctor of the Air element that served the Golden Queen. In Skylanders: Imaginators, Bad Juju becomes a Sensei who specializes in training the Swashbuckler battle class and fights alongside her son, Juju Junior.
  - Blaster-Tron (voiced by Alex Ness) is a robot of the Light element who is encountered in the Future of Skylands. In Skylanders: Imaginators, Blaster-Tron returns as a Sensei who specializes in training the Knight battle class.
  - Bomb Shell (voiced by Greg Ellis) is a bomb-wielding turtle of the Magic element who is encountered on the Chef Zeppelin.
  - Bone Chompy is a skeletal Chompy of the Undead element. While they are common enemies in the franchise, one Bone Chompy can be apprehended in the Golden Desert.
  - Brawl & Chain (voiced by Dave Boat) is a walrus pirate of the Water element with hook hands attached to chains that go into his arms. He is encountered at the Rainfish Riviera.
  - Brawlrus (voiced by Alex Ness) is a walrus pirate of the Tech element who is encountered at Rainfish Riviera.
  - Broccoli Guy (voiced by Alex Ness) is an anthropomorphic broccoli of the Life element that guarded the Chompy Hatchery on Chompy Mountain. In Skylanders: Imaginators, Broccoli Guy becomes Chill Bill's co-host on his radio show.
  - Bruiser Cruiser (voiced by Mitchell Whitfield) is a troll and former boxing champion who rides a large boxing mech suit. He is encountered on Chompy Mountain.
  - Buzzer Beak is a bird copter of the Air Element that is encountered on Know-It-All Island.
  - Chill Bill (voiced by Alex Ness) is a freeze ray-wielding ice troll who was encountered at Phoenix Psanctuary. He later became a radio personality for Troll Radio.
  - Chomp Chest (voiced by Patrick Seitz) is a living treasure chest of the Earth element that is encountered at the Monster Marsh.
  - Chompy is a mutant beast with eyestalks of the Life element. While they are common enemies in the franchise, one Chompy can be apprehended in the opposite dimension seen in the "Mirror of Mystery" expansion.
  - Cross Crow (voiced by Fred Tatasciore) is a crow of the Water element who is a known treasure hunter. He is encountered in Time Town.
  - Cuckoo Clocker is a cuckoo of the Life element that was summoned by Chef Pepper Jack at the Phoenix Sanctuary.
  - Eye Five (voiced by Kevin Michael Richardson) is a unique stitched mutant creature of the Life element with eyes on the palm of his hands that is encountered at the Monster Marsh.
  - Eye Scream (voiced by Salli Saffioti) is a unique stitched mutant creature of the Dark element that is encountered in Monster Marsh. She shoots eyeballs from its mouth.
  - Fisticuffs (voiced by Travis Willingham) is a large-handed Evilikin of the Dark element created by Dr. Krankcase who is encountered in the Secret Sewers of Extreme Stink.
  - Grave Clobber (voiced by Kevin Michael Richardson in Skylanders: Trap Team) is a stone mummy of the Earth element that served the Golden Queen in the Golden Desert. He is stated to have seven unnamed brothers. In Skylanders: Imaginators, he becomes a Sensei of the Water element who specializes in training the Brawler battle class.
  - Grinnade is a walking bomb of the Fire element that is encountered during "Operation: Troll Rocket Steal".
  - Hood Sickle (voiced by JB Blanc) is a Reaper of the Undead element who was summoned by Dreamcatcher at Telescope Towers. In Skylanders: Imaginators, Hood Sickle becomes a sensei of the Dark element who specializes in training the Sentinel battle class.
  - Lob Goblin (voiced by Rob Izenberg) is a troll of the Light element who is encountered on the Nightmare Express.
  - Krankenstein (voiced by Fred Tatasciore) is an Evilikin of the Air element that has large arms. He is named after his creator Dr. Krankcase and is encountered at the Mystic Mill.
  - Mad Lobs (voiced by Cam Clarke) is a Mabu of the Tech element who is encountered in the opposite dimension seen in the "Mirror of Mystery" expansion.
  - Masker Mind (voiced by Tom Kenny) is a ghost of the Undead element that is encountered at Rainfish Riviera.
  - Pain-Yatta (voiced by Kevin Schon) is a living piñata of the Magic element who wields a giant lollipop as a weapon. In Skylanders: Imaginators, he becomes a Sensei who specializes in training the Smasher battle class.
  - Rage Mage (voiced by Oliver Vaquer) is a trogmander of the Magic element who is encountered in the Secret Sewers of Extreme Stink.
  - Scrap Shooter (voiced by Dave Boat) is an Evilikin of the Fire element with three cannons hidden behind his face. He was created by Dr. Krankcase and is encountered at the Wilikin Workshop.
  - Shield Shredder (voiced by Tom Kenny) is a buzzsaw shield-wielding Evilikin of the Life Element. He was created by Dr. Krankcase and is encountered at the Mystic Mill.
  - Sheep Creep (voiced by Keythe Farley) is a sheep of the Life Element who is encountered at Soda Springs where he was the first of the villains to be apprehended. Buzz stated that Sheep Creep was sen to Cloudcracker Prison for leading an unsuccessful sheep rebellion.
  - Shrednaught is a troll duo of the Tech element that operate a chainsaw vehicle that are encountered at Phoenix Psanctuary. One troll (voiced by Alex Ness) serve as the brains while the second troll (voiced by Cam Clarke) operates the chainsaw vehicle.
  - Slobber Trap (voiced by Gregg Berger) is a rock dog of the Water element that is encountered on Know-It-All Island.
  - Smoke Scream (voiced by Cam Clarke) is a troll in a large two-legged fire-breathing mech of the Fire element who is encountered at The Ultimate Weapon.
  - Tae Kwon Crow (voiced by Alex Ness) is a ninja crow of the Dark element who led a gang of evil sky pirates as The Great Hawkmongus in the Skyhighlands. In Skylanders Imaginators, he becomes a Sensei of the Fire element who specializes in training the Ninja battle class.
  - Threatpack (voiced by Wally Wingert) is a jetpack-wearing troll of the Water element that is encountered during "Operation: Troll Rocket Steal".
  - Trolling Thunder is a troll of the Tech element that rides a troll-shaped tank. He is encountered on the Nightmare Express.
  - Tussle Sprout (voiced by Tom Kenny) is an anthropomorphic brussels sprout of the Earth element that is encountered on Know-It-All Island.
- The Darkness (voiced by Ike Amadi) is the overarching antagonist of the franchise who gains a physical body in Skylanders: SuperChargers.
- The Brain (voiced by Greg Proops) is a floating brain who appears in Skylanders: Imaginators.

== Development ==
After Activision merged with Vivendi Games, the Toys for Bob studio was tasked with creating a new Spyro title. Ideas included a dark, gritty reboot featuring bloody violence, which was almost immediately scrapped due to internal negative responses. They settled on creating an innovative, family-friendly game that relied on the communication between toys and the virtual world. Launching the first Skylanders game cost Activision around $100 million, roughly the same budget given to games like Call of Duty.

== Version differences ==
As the Skylanders franchise has been released on numerous platforms, with various versions developed by different developers, there are significant differences between them.

The most notable differences are found in the Nintendo 3DS versions, which have unique stories and gameplay more focused on platforming. Additionally, they use a separate, smaller portal that communicates via the console's infrared. In the first two games, players had to "load" two figures, and were able to swap between them at any time using the touch screen until a new Skylander is loaded to replace them. Beginning with Swap Force, every figure scanned is permanently saved into the game. In Trap Team, villains are captured using the touch screen instead of using real-life traps, which the 3DS portal does not support.

The first two games were developed with the Nintendo Wii in mind, with the HD versions being ports with slightly enhanced graphics. In contrast, starting with Swap Force, the games were developed for the HD consoles, with the Wii version having heavily downgraded graphics. In addition, Superchargers on Wii and 3DS was a distinct game titled Superchargers Racing, which only included the racing portions. Imaginators skipped these two consoles entirely.

While portals are typically interchangeable between platforms, the Xbox 360 and Xbox One versions of the game require their own portal respectively due to restrictions imposed by Microsoft.

The Nintendo Switch version of Imaginators does not use the Portal of Power; instead, the figures are scanned using the NFC on the game controller. Similar to the 3DS versions of the previous games, scanned figures are saved and can be switched through a menu. Traps are not supported, and Vehicles only unlock Imaginite Chests.

== Media ==
=== Novels ===
Cavan Scott wrote a series of books, beginning with Skylanders: The Machine of Doom, which takes place before the events of Spyro's Adventure. He would later write the Skylanders: The Mask of Power series, which also serves as a prequel to Spyro's Adventure. Another series, Skylanders: Book of Elements, focuses on two elements in each installment, with Shubrik Bros. Creative writing the first and Barry Hutchson writing the second.

=== Art Books ===
Two art books, Strata: The Art of Skylanders: Swap Force and Clutch: The Art of Skylanders: Superchargers, were produced by Vicarious Visions. As employee exclusives, the only way to obtain them is through online sellers or charity events.

=== IDW Publishing ===
IDW Publishing created a comic series associated with the Skylanders franchise which takes place in between games. The series was reportedly cancelled to avoid conflicting with Skylanders Academy, which used a different canon.

=== TV series ===
In 2016, it was announced that Activision Blizzard Studios would produce an animated television series based on Skylanders. The first season debuted on Netflix on October 28, 2016, the second season on October 6, 2017, and the third and final season premiered on September 28, 2018. On April 30, 2019, it was announced that Skylanders Academy was cancelled.

=== Possible film ===
Activision has commented on the possibility of a movie based on Skylanders. On May 6, 2014, Activision CEO Eric Hirshberg announced that the Activision team had an interest in "jumping on the film adaptation bandwagon" and adapting Skylanders into a film.

== Future ==
Following the release of Imaginators, the franchise went into hiatus, with speculations surrounding a seventh console installment. Nevertheless, future projects within the Skylanders universe were limited to the recent mobile game titled Ring of Heroes until its closure in 2022. The studios worked on other unrelated games until Activision Blizzard was acquired by Microsoft in January 2022. Activision CEO Bobby Kotick stated that Microsoft had interest in reviving some of the old studios' hit franchises, including Guitar Hero and Skylanders.

== Reception ==
Aggregate review scores
Game	Metacritic
Spyro's Adventure	3DS: 82/100; WII: 81/100; X360: 78/100; PS3: 77/100
Giants	X360: 80/100; WIIU: 80/100; WII: 78/100; PS3: 77/100; 3DS: 59/100
Swap Force	WIIU: 89/100; X360: 83/100; PS3: 83/100; PS4: 79/100; 3DS: 68/100
Trap Team	iOS: 90/100; WIIU: 86/100; XONE: 78/100; PS4: 78/100
SuperChargers	iOS: 88/100; WIIU: 87/100; PS4: 81/100; XONE: 76/100
Imaginators	PS4: 79/100; XONE: 78/100; WIIU: 77/100; NS: 72/100

Skylanders: Spyro's Adventure received "generally favorable" reviews according to review aggregator Metacritic. Skylanders: Spyro's Adventure was nominated for two Toy Industry Association awards: "Game of the Year" and "Innovative Toy of the Year".

Skylanders: Giants received "generally favorable" reviews on most platforms according to Metacritic; the Nintendo 3DS version received "mixed or average" reviews. However, the reviews in general were slightly lower than that of the previous game, especially for the Nintendo 3DS version, which received the lowest Metacritic score in the series.

Skylanders: Swap Force received "generally favorable" reviews for most platforms according to Metacritic; the Nintendo 3DS version received "mixed or average" reviews. The Metacritic scores for the game were the highest and most positive of the series on most platforms.

Skylanders: Trap Team received "generally favorable" reviews for most platforms according to Metacritic; the iOS version received "universal acclaim". Despite the scores from Metacritic being slightly lower than that of the previous game on most platforms, the iOS version received the highest Metacritic score in the series.

Skylanders: SuperChargers received "generally favorable" reviews according to Metacritic. The game was also nominated for two awards: Best Family Game at The Game Awards 2015 and Favorite Video Game at the 2016 Kids' Choice Awards. Despite its positive reception, Activision reported in February 2016 that the game did not meet sales expectations.

Skylanders: Imaginators received "generally favorable" reviews for most platforms according to Metacritic; the Nintendo Switch version received "mixed or average" reviews. Despite the generally positive reception, the game sold only 66,000 copies during its launch month.

As of February 2015, the Skylanders series has crossed the threshold of $3 billion in sales, with 175 million toys sold since 2011, making the series one of the top 20 highest-selling video game franchises of all time. As of June 2015, over 250 million toys were sold. As of 2016, over 300 million toys have been sold and the franchise has become the 11th biggest console franchise of all time.
