= Engine Software =

Dutch video game developer

Engine Software BV
- Formerly: MSX-Engine (1991–1995)
- Type: Video game developer
- Industry: Video games
- Founded: 1991
- Headquarters: Doetinchem, Netherlands
- Key people: Ivo Wubbels; Ruud van de Moosdijk
- Number of employees: 20-30
- Website: www.engine-software.com

Engine Software (formerly MSX-Engine) is a Dutch video game developer, located in Doetinchem, Netherlands, which specialized in handheld video games and digital platforms until 2011. In the period after (2011-present) they have become more active and known for high-end ports and adaptations of games to modern consoles, mobile, PC and streaming services like Stadia and Luna. Some of the best known games they have worked on include Puzzle Quest for the Nintendo DS, Terraria for PlayStation 3, PlayStation 4, PlayStation Vita, Xbox 360, Xbox One and Wii U, Killer7 Remastered for PC, Ni No Kuni: Wrath of the White Witch for Nintendo Switch and No More Heroes / No More Heroes 2 for Nintendo Switch.

In 2020 Engine Software announced they are working with Ubisoft to rerelease Scott Pilgrim vs The World: The Game, and also working with NIS America to release ports for Nintendo Switch and PC of Japanese developer Nihon Falcom's flagship titles Ys IX and Trails of Cold Steel IV.

== History ==
=== Early years (1995–2004) ===
Engine Software BV was founded in 1995 by several friends who met and worked together previously in the active Dutch demo scene for the MSX home computer. In this period (1989-1993) the group (named MSX-Engine) released three indie games, a disk magazine, a music tracker and an Assembler. In 1994 some of the people from MSX-Engine started working on a game for the Super NES, and the name was changed to Engine Software later the same year. In 1995 the group officially founded the company, making it the oldest (still active) game developer in The Netherlands. The game for SNES, Corn Buster, was unreleased after a publishing deal with Sunsoft fell through.

After this, Engine Software was asked by fellow game developer Vicarious Visions to support them in the development of several Game Boy Color games for clients like THQ and Vatical Entertainment. The relation between Vicarious Visions and Engine Software lasted another generation of handheld consoles, the Game Boy Advance, releasing games such as Powerrangers: Timeforce and SpyMuppets: License to Croak. Soon after the companies each went their own way.

=== Nintendo DS era (2005–2012) ===
In terms of sheer quantity this was Engine Software's most productive period, with 51 Nintendo DS titles released. Following their supporting developer role with Vicarious Visions earlier, Engine Software worked in the same role with 1st Playable Productions and Artificial Mind and Movement (rebranded back to Behaviour Interactive in 2010) on a wide range of Nintendo DS games based on licensed properties from Disney and Nickelodeon. At the same time the studio launched more games of its own design like Just Sing! and Lost Identities. With German publisher DTP Young Entertainment they developed a range of educational games for the German Market called "Think Kids" (licensed from Ravensburger), and they also signed a multi-game development deal with Belgian production house Studio 100 based on their TV properties (Mega Mindy, Maya the Bee, K3).

Dutch publisher Playlogic Entertainment NV, which purchased a minority share in Engine Software in 2003 invested in an original concept by the studio for PlayStation Portable called Stateshift. After a year in development Playlogic cancelled the development, and in early 2007 Engine Software bought back the shares from Playlogic Entertainment. The game Stateshift for PlayStation Portable was independently finished by Engine Software and published by Midas Interactive in Europe and Conspiracy Entertainment in the United States. Engine Software and Playlogic still collaborated on two Nintendo DS games after this: Dragonhunters in 2008 and Aliens in the Attic in 2009. During this time Engine Software also formed a relationship with Milan-based publisher 505 Games due to their penchant of creating games based on licensed materials. With 505 Games, Engine Software released movie-based games Cats & Dogs 2: The Revenge of Kitty Galore and HOP: THe Video Game.

=== Multi-platform era (2012–2020) ===
Around 2012 most work-for-hire licensed games work had dried up, and Engine Software rebranded itself as a multi-platform developer specializing in ports and adaptations of a wide area of games, from indie titles to triple-A titles. The first project was a multi-year multi-platform collaboration with 505 Games and Re-Logic to bring the smash-hit Terraria from PC to consoles, starting with PlayStation 3 and Xbox 360 in 2013 and later that year to PlayStation Vita. These releases were followed by versions of Terraria for PlayStation 4 and Xbox One in 2014, and finally a Wii U version 2016. During this time Engine Software and Re-Logic also collaborated on the concept and design for a Terraria spin-off title called Terraria: Otherworld which Re-Logic announced in 2015. Otherworld's development had some significant issues and delays causing Re-Logic to move development of the title to a different studio in 2017.

== Games developed ==
| Year | Title | Platform(s) | Note(s) |
|---|---|---|---|
| 1991 | Dizzy | MSX2 | Developer |
| 1992 | Dix | MSX2 | Developer |
| 1993 | D.A.S.S. | MSX2 | Developer |
| 2000 | Twisted Mind | Microsoft Windows | Developer |
| 2000 | Pro Darts | Game Boy Color | Supporting developer Vicarious Visions |
| 2000 | Rescue Heroes: Fire Frenzy | Game Boy Color | Supporting developer Vicarious Visions |
| 2001 | Sea-Doo Hydrocross | Game Boy Color | Supporting developer Vicarious Visions |
| 2001 | SpongeBob SquarePants: Legend of the Lost Spatula | Game Boy Color | Supporting developer Vicarious Visions |
| 2001 | Suske & Wiske: de Tijdtemmers | Game Boy Color | Developer |
| 2001 | Kelly Club: Clubhouse Fun | Game Boy Color | Developer |
| 2001 | €uro-Man | Microsoft Windows | Developer |
| 2001 | Leve de Koningin | Microsoft Windows | Developer |
| 2001 | Power Rangers: Time Force | Game Boy Advance | Supporting developer Vicarious Visions |
| 2002 | 5 Jumbo Puzzels: Kastelen | Microsoft Windows | Developer |
| 2002 | Artifact | Game Boy Advance | Developer |
| 2003 | X2: Wolverine's Revenge | Game Boy Advance | Supporting developer Vicarious Visions with GBA conversion |
| 2003 | Muppets: On with the Show | Game Boy Advance | Supporting developer Vicarious Visions |
| 2003 | Spy Muppets: License to Croak | Game Boy Advance | Supporting developer Vicarious Visions |
| 2003 | Coronel Indoor Kartracing | Microsoft Windows | Developer |
| 2004 | Mr. Donutman | Microsoft Windows | Developer |
| 2004 | Wade Hixton's Counter Punch | Game Boy Advance | Developer |
| 2006 | Wade Hixton's Counter Punch | DigiBlast | Developer |
| 2006 | Gormiti 1: The Masters of Gorm Island | DigiBlast | Developer |
| 2006 | Truckz | DigiBlast | Developer |
| 2007 | Cuccioli Cerca Amici | DigiBlast | Developer |
| 2007 | Gormiti 2: Lotta Oscura | DigiBlast | Developer |
| 2007 | Gormiti 3: Aggualo nella Valle | DigiBlast | Developer |
| 2007 | SparkBlast | DigiBlast | Developer |
| 2007 | High School Musical: Livin' the Dream | Game Boy Advance | Supporting developer A2M |
| 2007 | StateShift | PlayStation Portable | Developer |
| 2007 | Xyanide: Resurrection | PlayStation Portable | Supporting developer Playlogic Entertainment |
| 2007 | Marvel Trading Card Game | Nintendo DS | Supporting developer 1st Playable Productions |
| 2007 | Puzzle Quest | Nintendo DS | DS Conversion |
| 2007 | The Suite Life of Zack & Cody: Circle of Spies | Nintendo DS | Supporting developer A2M |
| 2008 | GoPets: Vacation Island | Nintendo DS | Supporting developer 1st Playable Productions |
| 2008 | Dragon Hunters | Nintendo DS | Developer |
| 2008 | Polar Bowler | Nintendo DS | DS conversion |
| 2008 | Think Kids | Nintendo DS | Developer |
| 2008 | Tropix | Nintendo DS | DS conversion |
| 2008 | Bang Attack | Wii | Developer |
| 2009 | Gripskids: Deutsch | Nintendo DS | Developer |
| 2009 | Gripskids: Mathematik | Nintendo DS | Developer |
| 2009 | Gripskids: Sachkunde | Nintendo DS | Developer |
| 2009 | Just Sing! | Nintendo DS | Developer |
| 2009 | My Virtual Tutor Reading: Pre-K to Kindergarten | Nintendo DS | Supporting developer 1st Playable Productions |
| 2009 | My Virtual Tutor Reading: Kindergarten to 1st Grade | Nintendo DS | Supporting developer 1st Playable Productions |
| 2009 | My Virtual Tutor Reading: 1st Grade to 2nd Grade | Nintendo DS | Supporting developer 1st Playable Productions |
| 2009 | Princess in Love | Nintendo DS | Developer |
| 2009 | Rummikub | Nintendo DS | Developer |
| 2009 | Think Kids 2 | Nintendo DS | Developer |
| 2010 | Aliens in the Attic | Nintendo DS | Developer |
| 2010 | Cats & Dogs: the Revenge of Kitty Galore | Nintendo DS | Developer |
| 2010 | Dance! It's Your Stage | Nintendo DS | Developer |
| 2010 | Music für Kids | Nintendo DS | Developer |
| 2010 | Bejeweled 2 | Wii | Developer |
| 2011 | Het Studio 100 Speel Eiland | Wii | Developer |
| 2011 | Hop | Nintendo DS | Developer |
| 2011 | Jewel Quest IV: Heritage | Nintendo DS | Developer |
| 2011 | Lost Treasures of Alexandria | Nintendo DS | Developer |
| 2011 | Real Crimes: The Unicorn Killer | Nintendo DS | Developer |
| 2011 | Mahjong 3D: Warriors of the Emperor | Nintendo 3DS | Developer |
| 2012 | Azada | Nintendo 3DS | Developer |
| 2012 | Secret Mysteries in London | Nintendo 3DS | Developer |
| 2012 | Mad Dog McCree | Nintendo 3DS | Developer |
| 2013 | SpongeBob SquarePants: Plankton's Robotic Revenge | Nintendo DS | Supporting developer Behaviour Interactive |
| 2013 | Maya | Nintendo DS | Supporting developer Studio 100 |
| 2013 | Terraria | PlayStation 3 | Handled port |
| 2013 | Terraria | PlayStation Vita | Handled port |
| 2013 | Terraria | Xbox 360 | Handled port |
| 2013 | 4 Elements | Nintendo 3DS | Developer |
| 2013 | Hidden Expedition Titanic | Nintendo 3DS | Developer |
| 2013 | Jewel Quest IV: Heritage | Nintendo 3DS | Developer |
| 2013 | Jewel Quest: The Sapphire Dragon | Nintendo 3DS | Developer |
| 2013 | Luxor HD | Nintendo 3DS | Developer |
| 2013 | Mystery Case Files: Dire Grove | Nintendo 3DS | Developer |
| 2013 | Mystery Case Files: Ravenhearst | Nintendo 3DS | Developer |
| 2013 | Mystery Case Files: Return to Ravenhearst | Nintendo 3DS | Developer |
| 2014 | Mindfeud | Nintendo 3DS | Developer |
| 2014 | Sumico | Nintendo 3DS | Developer |
| 2014 | Proun+ | iOS | Developer |
| 2014 | Terraria | PlayStation 4 | Handled port |
| 2015 | Dinox | Wii U | Developer |
| 2015 | Smart Adventures – Mission Math: Sabotage at the Space Station | Wii U | Developer |
| 2015 | Gunslugs 2 | Nintendo 3DS | Handled port |
| 2015 | Proun+ | Nintendo 3DS | Handled port |
| 2015 | Toki Tori 3D | Nintendo 3DS | Handled port |
| 2016 | Gunslugs | Nintendo 3DS | Handled port |
| 2016 | Terraria | Wii U | Handled port |
| 2017 | Earthlock | Wii U | Handled port |
| 2017 | Oceanhorn: Monster of Uncharted Seas | Android | Handled port |
| 2017 | Oceanhorn: Monster of Uncharted Seas | Nintendo Switch | Handled port |
| 2017 | Oceanhorn: Monster of Uncharted Seas | PlayStation 4 | Handled port |
| 2017 | Oceanhorn: Monster of Uncharted Seas | PlayStation Vita | Handled port |
| 2017 | Wuppo | PlayStation 4 | Handled port |
| 2017 | Blossom Tales | Nintendo Switch | Handled port |
| 2017 | Rive: Ultimate Edition | Nintendo Switch | Handled port |
| 2017 | Monopoly for Nintendo Switch | Nintendo Switch | Handled port |
| 2017 | Little Nightmares | Nintendo Switch | Handled port |
| 2018 | The Escapists 2 | Nintendo Switch | Handled port |
| 2018 | Into the Breach | Nintendo Switch | Handled port |
| 2018 | Risk | Nintendo Switch | Handled port |
| 2018 | 8-Bit Armies | PlayStation 4 | Handled port |
| 2018 | Underworld Ascendant | PlayStation 4 | Handled port |
| 2018 | Killer7 | Microsoft Windows | Handled port |
| 2019 | Ni no Kuni: Wrath of the White Witch | Nintendo Switch | Handled port |
| 2019 | Swords & Soldiers II: Shawarmageddon | Nintendo Switch | Handled port |
| 2019 | The Caligula Effect: Overdose | Nintendo Switch | Handled port |
| 2019 | The Caligula Effect: Overdose | Microsoft Windows | Handled port |
| 2020 | The Legend of Heroes: Trails of Cold Steel III | Microsoft Windows | Handled port |
| 2020 | The Legend of Heroes: Trails of Cold Steel III | Nintendo Switch | Handled port |
| 2020 | Adam's Venture: Origins | Nintendo Switch | Handled port |
| 2020 | No More Heroes | Nintendo Switch | Handled port |
| 2020 | No More Heroes 2: Desperate Struggle | Nintendo Switch | Handled port |
| 2020 | Oceanhorn 2: Knights of the Lost Realm | Nintendo Switch | Handled port |
| 2020 | Prinny: Can I Really Be the Hero? | Nintendo Switch | Handled port |
| 2020 | Prinny 2: Dawn of Operation Panties, Dood! | Nintendo Switch | Handled port |
| 2020 | Monstrum | Nintendo Switch | Handled port |
| 2020 | Monstrum | PlayStation 4 | Handled port |
| 2020 | Monstrum | Xbox One | Handled port |
| 2020 | Little Nightmares | Stadia | Handled port |
| 2020 | Monopoly | Stadia | Handled port |
| 2021 | Scott Pilgrim vs. the World: The Game | Microsoft Windows | Handled port |
| 2021 | Scott Pilgrim vs. the World: The Game | Nintendo Switch | Handled port |
| 2021 | Scott Pilgrim vs. the World: The Game | PlayStation 4 | Handled port |
| 2021 | Scott Pilgrim vs. the World: The Game | Stadia | Handled port |
| 2021 | Scott Pilgrim vs. the World: The Game | Xbox One | Handled port |
| 2021 | Little Nightmares II | Nintendo Switch | Handled port |
| 2021 | The Legend of Heroes: Trails of Cold Steel IV | Microsoft Windows | Handled port |
| 2021 | The Legend of Heroes: Trails of Cold Steel IV | Nintendo Switch | Handled port |
| 2021 | Ys IX: Monstrum Nox | Microsoft Windows | Handled port |
| 2021 | Ys IX: Monstrum Nox | Nintendo Switch | Handled port |
| 2021 | Monopoly Madness | | Handled port |
| 2021 | Monopoly Madness | Luna | Handled port |
| 2021 | Monopoly Madness | Nintendo Switch | Handled port |
| 2021 | Monopoly Madness | PlayStation 4 | Handled port |
| 2021 | Monopoly Madness | Stadia | Handled port |
| 2021 | Monopoly Madness | Xbox One | Handled port |
| 2024 | Shadows of the Damned Hella Remastered | | Handled port |
| 2024 | Shadows of the Damned Hella Remastered | PlayStation 5 | |
| 2024 | Shadows of the Damned Hella Remastered | PlayStation 4 | |
| 2024 | Shadows of the Damned Hella Remastered | Xbox Series X/S | |
| 2024 | Shadows of the Damned Hella Remastered | Xbox One | |
| 2024 | Shadows of the Damned Hella Remastered | Nintendo Switch | |
| 2024 | Shadows of the Damned Hella Remastered | Microsoft Windows | |

== Middleware ==
The Engine Software Music Replayer is a piece of music sequencer middleware, developed by Engine Software. It was developed for use on the Game Boy Advance, and later reproduced in a version for use on the Nintendo DS. It was licensed to many other developers for both platforms.

== Key staff ==
Engine Software is run by Ivo Wubbels (CEO) and Ruud van de Moosdijk (VP Development), both founders of the company in 1995. Other key figures within the company include Senior producer Jeroen Schmitz also one of the founders of the company, Lead Technology programmer Jan-Lieuwe Koopmans who created the Music Replayer, and composer Bart Roijmans who scored almost all of Engine Software's games.
