= Crash Nitro Kart (GBA video game) =

2003 video game

- North American Game Boy Advance box art
- Developer: Vicarious Visions
- Publisher: Universal Interactive (Note: N-Gage version published by Vivendi Universal Games)
- Director: Sam Calis
- Producer: David Robinson
- Designer: Sean Murphy
- Programmers: Matthew Conte; Jan-Erik Steel
- Artists: Steve Derrick; Eric DeSantis; Sean Murphy
- Composer: Shin'en Multimedia
- Series: Crash Bandicoot
- Platforms: Game Boy Advance, N-Gage
- Release: Game Boy Advance: NA: November 11, 2003; EU: December 5, 2003; N-Gage: NA: August 2004
- Genre: Kart racing
- Modes: Single-player, multiplayer

Crash Nitro Kart is a 2003 kart racing video game developed by Vicarious Visions and published by Universal Interactive for the Game Boy Advance. A version for the N-Gage was released in 2004. The plot involves Crash Bandicoot and his friends and enemies being abducted by a galactic dictator and forced to compete in an interplanetary circuit. The game is Vicarious Visions's first racing game for the GBA, as well as their first GBA game to utilize a Mode 7 engine. The N-Gage version features 3D tracks with contours added to the terrain.

The GBA version was positively received as a competent kart racer with strong mechanics, track design, and replayability, but it was held back by technical slowdowns and lack of originality. Reception to the N-Gage version was mixed, with its core gameplay and content praised but heavily undermined by the platform's limitations, particularly the narrow screen and control issues.

== Gameplay ==
An example of a race in Crash Nitro Kart. The player, in second place, is armed with a missile, a power-up that targets the racer directly ahead of the player.

Crash Nitro Kart is a kart racing game in which players control karts driven by Crash Bandicoot characters across a selection of 13 tracks, racing against AI or other players in lap-based contests. The characters' karts vary in speed, acceleration, and handling, offering distinct driving experiences (e.g., heavy and fast vs. light and spry), allowing players to choose based on racing style. The basic controls include accelerating, braking, hopping, and using power-ups. The power slide mechanic, triggered by holding the hop button while turning, allows players to drift through turns to build a boost gauge. Tapping the accelerator at the right moment (indicated by the gauge turning red) triggers a turbo boost, with skilled players able to chain up to three boosts for significant speed advantages. Collecting Wumpa fruit increases a kart's top speed slightly and enhances the power of weapons. Power-ups, collected from item boxes, include bombs, homing missiles, shields, tornadoes, and turbo boosts. Many have dual functions; for example, bombs can be launched forward or backward or detonated remotely, and shields can be fired as missiles.

The game has a single-player campaign along with time trial, arcade, and multiplayer modes. In the single-player mode, players progress through hub-based worlds, racing to earn trophies, collect relics, tokens, or crystals, and face boss races. The mode offers two story paths between Crash Bandicoot's team or Doctor Neo Cortex's team. The arcade mode includes single races and cup circuits. In the time trial mode, players can record race times, which could be uploaded to the Vicarious Visions website via passwords. The GBA and N-Gage versions support four-player racing via the Game Link Cable and Bluetooth respectively. The GBA version can connect with the GameCube version via the GameCube – Game Boy Advance link cable, which unlocks extra characters and a secret minigame.

== Plot ==
Crash Bandicoot and his friends, as well as Doctor Neo Cortex and his minions, are abducted by a mysterious light. They are transported to the coliseum of Emperor Velo XXVII, ruler of a distant galaxy, who forces them to compete in his Galactic Circuit, a series of high-stakes kart races. Velo declares that winning the circuit will earn their freedom, but refusing will result in Earth's destruction. The teams race across four worlds — Terra, Barin, Fenomena, and Teknee — collecting trophies and facing each world's champion. On Terra, they defeat Krunk, who relinquishes his Galactic Key and acknowledges their skill. In Barin, they beat Nash, a hyperactive cybernetic shark, earning another Key. On Fenomena, they overcome Norm, an odd racer who splits into two forms, gaining a third Key. Finally, on Teknee, they defeat Geary, a perfectionist robot, securing the fourth Key. With all four Galactic Keys, the teams face Emperor Velo in a final race. The outcome depends on the team chosen. If Team Bandicoot defeats Velo, they are celebrated as the first to win the Galactic Circuit. Velo offers them his empire, but they choose to return to Earth, relaxing on a beach. If Team Cortex defeats Velo, Cortex seizes Velo's scepter, believing he has won control. However, they are mistakenly sent to Terra instead of Earth, surrounded by Krunk's species, realizing they are far from home.

== Development and release ==
The console and GBA versions of Crash Nitro Kart were announced by Vivendi Universal prior to the E3 2003 trade show. The game was developed by Vicarious Visions under the direction of Universal Interactive's Sam Calis, with Universal's David Robinson serving as producer. The game was designed by Sean Murphy, who was also an artist for the game alongside Steve Derrick and Eric DeSantis. The game was programmed by Matthew Conte and Jan-Erik Steel. The music was composed by Shin'en Multimedia. Although Vicarious Visions had prior experience developing racing titles such as Polaris SnoCross and Sea-Doo Hydrocross, Crash Nitro Kart is the developer's first racing game for the GBA, as well as their first GBA game to utilize a Mode 7 engine. Crash Nitro Kart was released in North America on November 11, 2003, and in Europe on December 5 of the same year.

On February 16, 2004, Nokia and Vivendi Universal Games announced that an N-Gage version of Crash Nitro Kart was in development. This version was showcased at E3 2004, and was released in August 2004. Unlike the GBA version, the tracks in the N-Gage version are 3D constructions, with added contours to the tracks' terrain.

== Reception ==
Reception

Aggregate score
Aggregator	Score	
Aggregator	GBA	N-Gage
Metacritic	77/100	64/100

Review scores
Publication	Score	
Publication	GBA	N-Gage
GameSpot	7.8/10	6.9/10
GameSpy	N/A	1.5/5
GameZone	N/A	6.5/10
IGN	7.8/10	8.2/10
Jeuxvideo.com	11/20	9/20
Nintendo Power	16.5/25	N/A
X-Play	4/5	N/A

The original GBA release of Crash Nitro Kart received "generally favorable" reviews according to Metacritic, while the N-Gage version received "mixed or average" reviews. Frank Provo of GameSpot and Scott Steinberg of Xplay viewed it as a fun, polished title that improves on the kart racing formula in its deepened gameplay mechanics, while Craig Harris of IGN saw it as a near-contender for the best GBA kart racer if not for the slowdowns. Killy of Jeuxvideo.com was more critical, calling it an average title that fails to engage fully due to technical and design flaws. Regarding the N-Gage version, Levi Buchanan of IGN was the most positive, viewing it as a solid fit for the N-Gage's QD model and a strong launch title, while Ryan Davis of GameSpot and Louis Bedigian of GameZone acknowledged the potential for a good game but criticized the camera and visibility issues. Justin Leeper of GameSpy and Dinowan of Jeuxvideo.com were highly critical, with Leeper calling it the worst kart racer he had played, citing unplayable gameplay and technical flaws.

Reviewers generally praised the game's solid execution of the kart racing formula, with improvements over typical Mario Kart clones. Steinberg highlighted the inclusion of warm-up boosts, power slides, and performance-induced bonuses, which added depth to the racing mechanics. Harris emphasized the power slide system, particularly the boost mechanic, as a well-tuned standout feature. Provo noted the control over power slides for its precision and the strategic use of Wumpa fruit to enhance speed and weapon strength. Killy, however, criticized the drifting system as impractical and collision issues with scenery, which unnecessarily complicated gameplay. The controls in the N-Gage version were a significant issue, described as snappy and imprecise. Leeper and Dinowan criticized the difficulty in mastering controls due to the N-Gage's button layout and lack of shoulder buttons, making actions like power sliding and weapon use cumbersome. Buchanan was more positive, noting that the N-Gage's ability to press multiple buttons was an improvement over typical cellphone games, but still acknowledged control challenges.

The visuals of both versions were assessed positively, while reception to the music was mixed. Provo and Steinberg commended the Mode 7 visuals of the GBA version as sharp and colorful, though Killy highlighted a significant issue with the game's depth of field, caused by pixel interweaving along the horizon, which obscures track visibility and makes turns difficult to navigate. The visuals were also a highlight of the N-Gage version, with Davis and Buchanan noting the 3D tracks and aesthetics as clean, colorful, and bright. Buchanan compared the graphics favorably to Crash Team Racing and the GBA version, with minimal tearing and solid framerates in less crowded moments. Bedigian also praised the PlayStation-quality visuals and detailed tracks. Some reviewers complimented the soundtrack for fitting the series' whimsical tone, while others were less enthusiastic, with Killy and Bedigian criticizing repetitive music.

Reviewers consistently highlighted the tracks as diverse and well-designed, offering replay value and challenge. Steinberg described rewarding stage setups across the hubs. Provo and Harris echoed this, noting that the tracks' varied layouts require practice and enhance replay value, despite fewer tracks compared to Mario Kart: Super Circuit. Bedigian highlighted the variety and efficiency of the track designs, which mirror the console versions and add replay value. Provo and Harris appreciated the variety of modes for increasing replayability, noting the diverse challenges in the single-player campaign, which add depth beyond standard racing. Reviewing the N-Gage version, Davis and Buchanan noted the inclusion of Bluetooth multiplayer for up to four players, which adds value. Bedigian praised the immediate accessibility of tracks and modes, appealing to both casual and hardcore players. Both versions were criticized as Mario Kart clones, with little innovation beyond the Crash Bandicoot branding. Steinberg explicitly called it a clone, though one with solid execution, while Killy described it as an average title that does not surpass Mario Kart: Super Circuit. Leeper and Dinowan were particularly harsh, with Leeper calling it a failure to capture the fun of the genre and Dinowan noting it as an unconvincing representative of kart racers.

Technical issues were noted in both versions. The game engine's slowdown during intense moments was the most significant criticism of the GBA version, particularly when multiple characters and power-ups are on-screen. Harris described this as a "serious downer", noting it affects timing for boosts and overall gameplay. Killy also criticized frequent slowdowns, comparing them unfavorably to other GBA titles like Golden Sun or V-Rally 3. Provo acknowledged occasional slowdowns but noted they were less disruptive. The N-Gage's narrow screen was seen as a major detriment, severely limiting visibility and playability. Davis and Dinowan emphasized the tight camera perspective, which restricts peripheral vision and makes it hard to anticipate turns or see opponents, leading to frequent crashes and frustration. Bedigian noted the jerky camera, which caused nausea and exacerbated the small screen's limitations. Buchanan also mentioned the large character sprites crowding the screen, obstructing track visibility. Leeper was scathingly critical, calling the gameplay "unplayable" due to erratic movement, a chuggy framerate, and poorly implemented weapons that fail to enhance the experience.
