= Michael Stout =

American video game designer (born 1980)

Michael James Stout
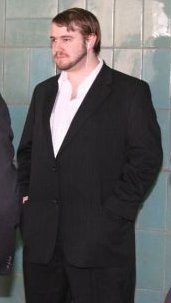
- Stout in 2011
- Born: 1980 (age 45–46)
- Education: Holy Names University
- Occupation: Video game designer
- Years active: 2002–present

Michael "Mike" Stout (born 1980) is an American video game designer best known for his work on Resistance: Fall of Man (2006), as the lead multiplayer designer. Resistance: Fall of Man received significant critical praise, much of which focused on its multiplayer content. From November 2007 to July 2009, he was the Creative Director at Bionic Games working on Spyborgs, an action game for the Nintendo Wii. According to a post on his blog on November 13, 2009, he was employed by Activision in their Central Design group to design several games in the Skylanders franchise.

== Education ==
Stout graduated from Loyola High School of Los Angeles in 1998. He went on to Holy Names University in Oakland, California, where he earned a BA in English, with a minor in Computer Science in 2001.

== Career ==
Stout got his start in the video game industry at Insomniac Games as a QA Tester on Ratchet & Clank. During that project he was promoted to Junior Designer. He continued to work on the Ratchet & Clank (series) for three years, rising to Designer and Senior Designer in the process. After his fourth Ratchet & Clank game, Stout was moved to the new Resistance project, as the Lead Multiplayer Designer. Two years later, Resistance: Fall of Man became his last title at Insomniac Games.

In March 2007 Stout accepted the Lead Level Design position at Obsidian Entertainment for Aliens RPG. There he worked with Chris Avellone and several other industry veterans. Before shipping a game, however, he left to become the Creative Director of Bionic Games. Creative Director is the highest position within the field of video game design, and thus presented an important opportunity.

Almost four months after Bionic Games imploded in 2009, Mike accepted a position at Activision as a Design Specialist in their Central Design group, where he helped design several very successful Skylanders games.

In 2013, Mike Stout left Activision to form his own company, Interactive Axis. According to the company website, he currently offers Design Consulting services to video game developers and publishers.

In December 2016, Mike Stout joined the Interactive Media department of Harrisburg University of Science and Technology, in Harrisburg PA, as the 'Game Designer in Residence'. During his time at HU, Mike will mentor students, collaborate with faculty members, work on client projects and co-teach game design courses.

In June 2020, Mike announced in Twitter that he had worked on Crash Bandicoot 4: It's About Time, as a Principal Designer.

In June 2021, Mike started to work as a Principal Game Designer for Blizzard Entertainment.

== Uselessopinions ==
The humor site "Uselessopinions.com" was co-created by Michael Stout and Anthony Garcia in 2002. The site focuses on joke articles and maintains a juvenile tone. The format mimics a piece of homework, with author, teacher's name, and date at the top. The teacher's name is always "Mr. Lew", a reference to Michael Lew, Stout and Garcia's high school Computer Science teacher. Later Uselessopinions grew to include a forum community and Stout's blog ("On Game Design"), but the humor articles became infrequent and as of August 14, 2007 the site is undergoing a redesign.

On Uselessopinions, Stout wrote under the pseudonym, "Dodger". He has continued to use "Dodger" as an alias in his career at Insomniac Games and on various websites. The nickname is a reference to Artful Dodger from the Charles Dickens novel Oliver Twist.

== Credits ==
- Ratchet & Clank series
  - Ratchet & Clank (2002) – QA Lead / Junior Designer
    - Ratchet & Clank (2016)
  - Going Commando (2003) – Junior Designer
  - Up Your Arsenal (2004) – Designer
  - Deadlocked (2005) – Senior Designer
  - Into the Nexus (2013)
- Resistance: Fall of Man (2006) – Lead Multiplayer Designer
- Resistance 2 (2008)
- Aliens: Crucible (Cancelled)
- Spyborgs (2009) – Creative Director
- Transformers: War for Cybertron (2010)
- Skylanders: Spyro's Adventure (2011)
- Skylanders: Giants (2012)
- Skylanders: Swap Force (2013)
- Crash Bandicoot 4: It's About Time (2020)
