= Dark Angael =

1997 video game

- Developer: Vicarious Visions
- Publisher: Vicarious Visions
- Platform: Microsoft Windows
- Release: NA: September 29, 1997
- Genres: Run-and-gun, action-adventure

Dark Angael is a PC video game by Vicarious Visions. It is a 2D run-and-gun shoot-'em-up action-adventure platform game released on September 29, 1997.

== Plot ==
The Dark Angael, Carina, must defend the world against Azrael and his army of demons. She has a number of superpowers to find and utilize including Mutator, Psychic Attack, Reflection, Teleport Coin and Energy Wave.

== Development ==
Dark Angael was the company's first original game, as Synnergist has been created on commission by British publisher 21st Century. The game has elaborate detail including lengthy scripts, a detailed storyline, original music, actor-spoken dialogue, video segments, and impressive graphics. Altogether, the game took up a space of as much as 100 million bytes of space, and cost $250,000 to produce in total. Guha Bala, President of Vicarious Visions, said "It's a thrill when you know you're working on something like that...[we] get a charge out of writing [gamed] that push the limits of technology".

The game went on sale at the company's website in October 1997, and was distributed electronically by gaming magazines. A French-language version of the game was created and published in various French-speaking nations such as France, French-speaking Africa, Belgium, Canada and Switzerland. A German version was also set to debut February 1998. At the time of the game's release, Vicarious Visions had "seven full-time employees and squadron of contractors".

== Critical reception ==
The game has received mixed reviews.

Power Unlimited gave the game a 7.8 out of 10, commenting "DA is a nice platform game. A dark storyline, lots of action and smooth gameplay. Good for a few days of excitement." 7Wolf Magazine gave Dark Angel 5.5 out of 10, saying "Graphics, quite nice for its time, of course, now looks old-fashioned, as well as sound. Flat painted backdrops, sprites and explosions are the same waddling moving monsters." Meristation gave it a 5 out of 10, writing "It is not the best approach to the very similar gameplay of Blizzard's Diablo idea or Duke Nukem. I thought I had found something different ... but it only brought back good memories of other old games." Joystick (French) rated the game 10 out of 100, writing "This is not a game, it's a hazing. The kind of thing that would have made me giggle on the Atari ST." Computer Gaming World gave the game a rating of 3 out of 5 stars, writing "This is a decent enough game with good potential for keeping players busy for hours".
