= Tony Hawk's Pro Skater 2 (GBA video game) =

2001 video game

- North American box art featuring Tony Hawk performing an aerial skateboarding trick
- Developer: Vicarious Visions
- Publisher: Activision
- Programmers: Matt Conte; Alex Rybakov
- Composer: Manfred Linzner
- Series: Tony Hawk's
- Platform: Game Boy Advance
- Release: NA: June 11, 2001; EU: June 22, 2001; JP: December 14, 2001
- Genre: Extreme sports
- Mode: Single-player

Tony Hawk's Pro Skater 2 is a 2001 skateboarding video game developed by Vicarious Visions and published by Activision for the Game Boy Advance (GBA) handheld game console. It is a portable version of the console game of the same name, starring the skateboarder Tony Hawk. While the console versions of the game have the camera positioned behind the player-character, this version uses an isometric perspective, featuring modified levels taken from the console version. The player is tasked with getting as high a score as they can in a limited time by performing skateboarding tricks.

Vicarious Visions proposed the creation of a GBA version, getting approval from Activision and Tony Hawk. To include the tricks from the PlayStation, they created a 3D engine for the game, featuring polygonal characters. The music was composed by Manfred Linzner as a pastiche of the music featured in the series, as well as songs from "skate punk-type artists". Tony Hawk's series quality assurance testers were initially critical of the game for lacking "purposeful level design" and were brought on to help address these issues. It was released as a launch title for the GBA in North America and Europe in June 2001 after being developed for one year.

Tony Hawk's Pro Skater 2 has been generally well received, and has been considered by multiple critics as one of the best GBA games. Vicarious Visions received particular praise for pushing the GBA beyond what people expected it to be capable of. While some critics had difficulty with the game's perspective and controls, it has been called an exemplar of how to port a console game to a handheld system. The 3D engine created for the game was used in future games by Vicarious Visions on the GBA, including its sequel, Tony Hawk's Pro Skater 3.

== Gameplay ==
The player makes the character (center) perform skateboarding tricks to score points—a signature element of the series—in isometric levels.

Tony Hawk's Pro Skater 2 is a single-player skateboarding video game. While controlling the character, the player can perform multiple skateboarding tricks, including ollies, grinds, aerials, and kickflips. Other actions include jumping, braking, crouching, and switching stances. The player scores more points through combining multiple tricks. Tony Hawk's Pro Skater 2 features seven levels, which comprises five from the console versions of the game, one from the first game, and a secret stage. The levels are viewed from an isometric perspective instead of behind the player-character's back like in the console versions. The levels are based on New York, Philadelphia, and Marseille. The game features 13 playable characters, including Tony Hawk, each of whom has their own special technique. It also allows players to input codes that unlock multiple features, including the ability to play as Spider-Man.

The game has three different modes of play: career mode, where the player completes tasks to unlock more levels and increase stats with a time limit; single session mode, where the player can skate in any level with the same time limit; and free skate mode, where the time limit is removed. Each level has certain tasks to complete in career mode, including finding money and breaking objects. There are also objects to collect in each stage, including the letters S-K-A-T-E and video tapes.

== Development and release ==
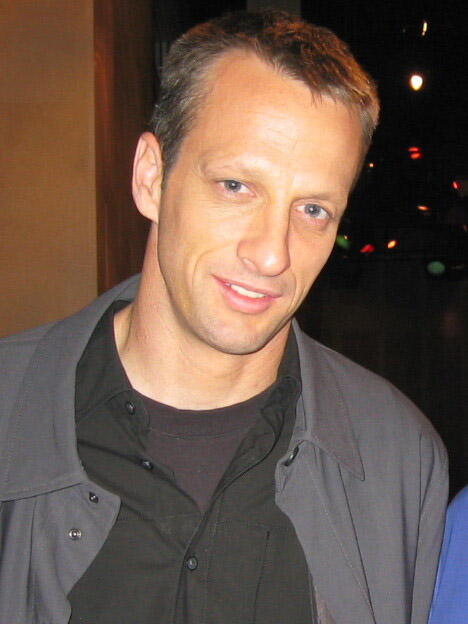
Mockups of the game were presented to Tony Hawk, who approved the project alongside Activision.

After completing development of the Game Boy Color version of the video game Spider-Man, developer Vicarious Visions wanted to move on to the Game Boy Advance (GBA), avoiding common projects for the platform like Super Nintendo ports and Mode 7 racing games. During brainstorming, someone suggested a Tony Hawk game. Vicarious Visions considered the idea fun but high risk, due in part to it being an important brand to publisher Activision. Development of this version of Tony Hawk's Pro Skater 2 began in August 2000, Vicarious Visions having received an early development kit for the platform. The staff received occasional input from Neversoft, which developed the game's console versions. The team experienced issues during early development, attributing their issues to a shortage of game development kits and hardware revisions. The team intended to use the source code Neversoft used, but the code was programmed in C++, and the development kit's documentation said they must use C. Lead programmer Matt Conte created a proof of concept to show that C++ could be done on the GBA, allowing them to use a large majority of the code from the PlayStation. Conte stated that this is what allowed them to create physics and tricks accurate to the original game. Mockups were created to demonstrate how it might look, which were presented to Tony Hawk, who gave his approval alongside Activision.

This version of Tony Hawk's Pro Skater 2 began as a sprite-based game but was changed after staff determined that this would require more than 100 megabytes of storage if they wanted to include every trick from the PlayStation version. Because the GBA was a 2D console, they had to create a 3D engine for the game, utilizing an isometric perspective and a real-time-rendered polygonal character rendered using more than 300 polygons. The isometric perspective was chosen due to the developers believing that the level geometry found in the console versions, if viewed from above, would largely be visible. Additionally, they felt the view would work well with the tile-based graphical system of the GBA. Vicarious Visions aimed to create a similar design to the PlayStation and Dreamcast versions, some maps modified to compensate for the isometric angle. Due to not having a level editor for the GBA, they programmed math functions to design the grid-based levels. The developers set point values for tiles in a heightmap to give the levels depth. Tiles for flat planes rely on the point values whereas the curved ramps are generated with parametric equations. A Gouraud shader was used for the game's real-time renderer, which Alex Rybakov programmed in a month and a half. After trying to use the console's graphical hardware to obscure the character behind objects, the developers switched to a software masking method, with the character becoming semi-transparent when behind objects. The team was unable to add a multiplayer mode, a feature of the console versions, due to time restrictions.

Unlike other versions of Tony Hawk's Pro Skater 2, this version features an original soundtrack due to the licensed music being too large for a GBA cartridge. The soundtrack was composed by Manfred Linzner, who was asked to create a pastiche of songs featured in the Tony Hawk games. Linzner was given a selection of songs from the games, as well as other songs selected from "skate punk-type artists" as reference. The final soundtrack consisted of 10 songs. Shin'en Multimedia implemented the music using its GAX sound engine. The cartridge uses a more advanced sound chip than the Game Boy Color's, as the team wanted to have audio more advanced than chiptune audio.

When the game was sent to Activision's quality assurance department, the team devoted exclusively to the Tony Hawk series provided harsh feedback. While the testers felt it looked appropriate and was "technically impressive", they were critical of it for lacking the "purposeful level design" of the console version. Conte stated that in retrospect, the levels failed to replicate the PlayStation version's attention to detail and rewarding skillful play. The quality assurance team was brought on as consultants, going through each level to add elements that encouraged chaining moves and high-level skills. Development was concluded in less than a year in April 2001. The approved release version took a large majority of the cartridge memory space.

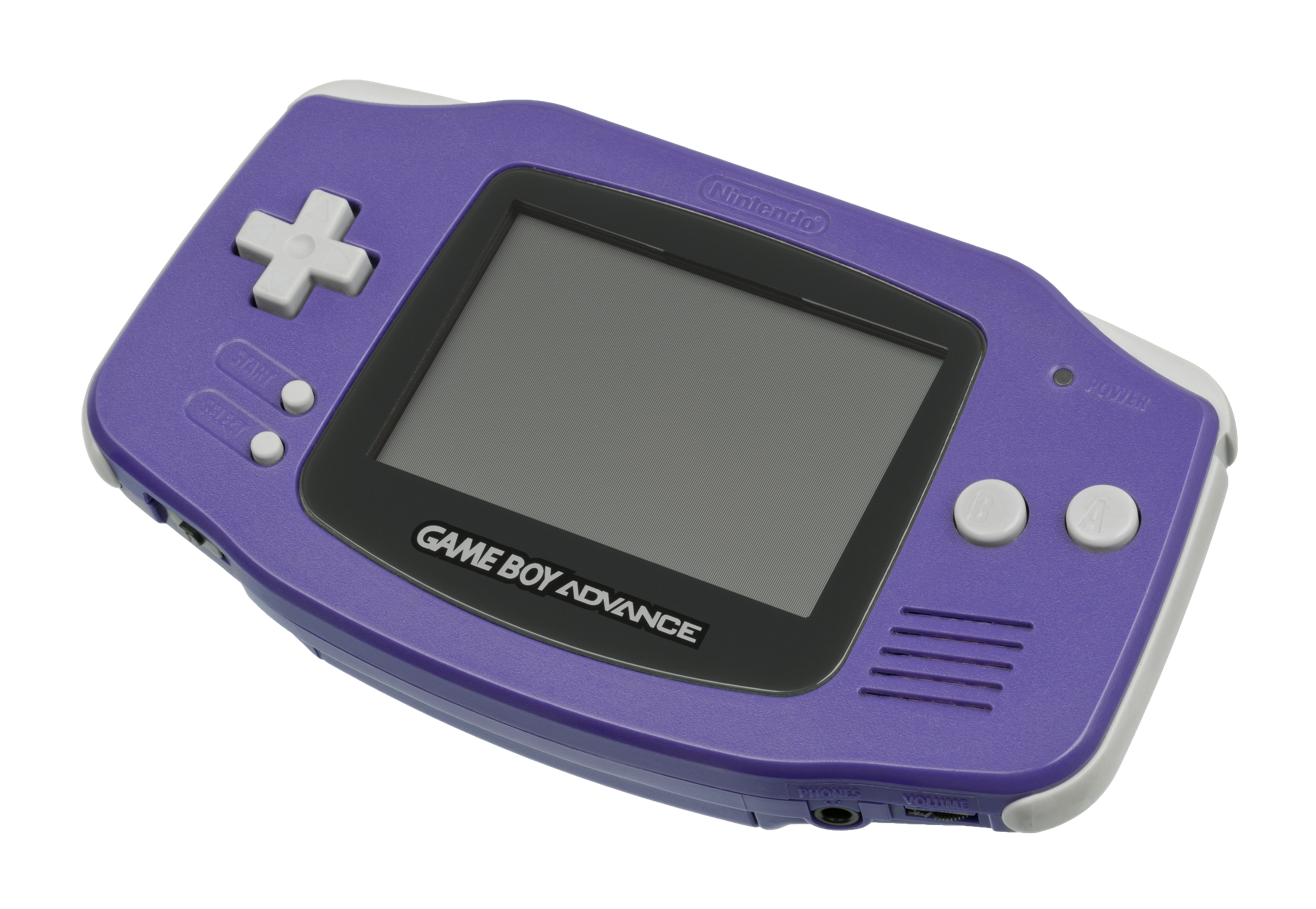
Tony Hawk's Pro Skater 2 was a Game Boy Advance launch title in North America and Europe.

Tony Hawk's Pro Skater 2 was demonstrated at multiple events, including E3 2001 and by the group Advance Team in Minnesota, alongside other GBA games. It was one of six games scheduled to be released for the GBA by Activision at the time. Tony Hawk's Pro Skater 2 was published as a launch title for the GBA on June 11, 2001, and in Europe on June 22. The game later released in Japan on December 14, 2001, as SK8: Tony Hawk's Pro Skater 2. (Note: Japanese: SK8 トニーホークのプロスケーター2, Hepburn: SK8: Tonī Hōku no Puro Sukētā 2) Tony Hawk's Pro Skater 2 was one of the top-selling GBA launch games in North America, placing second behind Super Mario Advance and third across all platforms for the month of June. It ranked seventh overall in the following month and fourteenth in August, losing its second place GBA ranking to Mario Kart: Super Circuit.

== Reception ==
Reception

Aggregate score
Aggregator	Score
Metacritic	95/100

Review scores
Publication	Score
Electronic Gaming Monthly	9/10, 9/10, 7.5/10
Eurogamer	8/10
Famitsu	8/10, 9/10, 7/10, 9/10
Game Informer	9.25/10
GamePro	5/5
GameSpot	9.3/10
GameSpy	95/100
IGN	9.5/10
Nintendo World Report	9/10

Award
Publication	Award
BAFTA Interactive Entertainment Awards	Best mobile game (2001)

Tony Hawk's Pro Skater 2 was positively received by critics and gamers, particularly for Vicarious Visions defying expectations of what the GBA could do. It received universal acclaim according to review aggregator website Metacritic, labeling it a "must-play". It was identified as a key launch title for the system by Eurogamer writer Oli Welsh, and was considered one of the best GBA games by Den of Geek, GameSpot, GamesRadar+, IGN, Pocket Tactics, and TechRadar. When selecting which GBA launch title to recommend, GameSpot writer Shane Satterfield stated that the game made him excited to see what the GBA could output down the line. He ultimately recommended Fire Pro Wrestling instead, viewing the console Tony Hawk games as superior. Craig Harris, writing for IGN, considered it among the best games at the handheld's launch, finding its gameplay loop entertaining and varied. It was awarded the best mobile game of 2001 at the BAFTA Interactive Entertainment Awards, and received a nomination for Hand-Held Game of the Year at the 5th Annual Interactive Achievement Awards.

The game's levels received praise as good adaptations of the console versions', with Electronic Gaming Monthly writer Crispin Boyer stating that they were "surprisingly good". He found the smaller stages to be more fun, while finding the more open levels' camera angle confusing. Boyer found the controls limiting, attributing it to the GBA's limited number of buttons. Fellow Electronic Gaming Monthly writer Greg Sewart also found the controls awkward, stating that the perspective made it more difficult to control. He believed that players could get past it with patience but expected that many may become frustrated. Martin Taylor of Eurogamer was more positive towards the camera perspective, feeling it forced players to explore the levels before they focused on the tasks in each, which he believed was a core aspect of the Tony Hawk series. GameSpy writer Andrew S. Bub considered the isometric perspective a good compromise, believing that it allowed players to play more confidently. He also found the controls accurate, appreciating the existence of a tutorial and button mapping to make the controls easier to get used to.

Reception for the lack of features compared to the console versions was mixed. Gamekult writer Usul was disappointed by the lack of a multiplayer mode, feeling that this—compounded with the lack of levels and limitations compared to the console versions—made it an inferior experience despite still enjoying it. Jonathan Metts, writing for Nintendo World Report, commented that players who could do without the multiplayer and level editor found in the console game may find this an adequate alternative to the console versions. He believed that someone already familiar with the console game will not find a new gameplay experience. It was described as an adequate alternative to the console version by Nintendojo writer Matt Thompson. He enjoyed that he could play it wherever he wants, which prevented it from getting old like the console versions did for him. In the Japanese video game magazine Weekly Famitsu, the reviewers found the overt amount of English-language menus made it difficult to understand the conditions in career mode, though one saying Japanese players should not pass on the game because of this.

The game's visuals and technical aspects were the subject of praise, with Jack Yarwood of Time Extension believing that it inspired the creation of future games with a similar approach and technology. It was also called "the most amazing piece of technology we've ever seen on a handheld" by Next Generation staff. Martin Taylor was initially skeptical of how good the game could perform when he heard about its reveal, being surprised by how similar it felt to its console counterparts. Crispin Boyer was similarly positive, calling it visually stunning and noting that it had smooth movement and a superior frame rate to the PlayStation version. GamePro writer Dan Elektro believed that a person would find it difficult to not be impressed by the level of technical quality in the game, particularly it running at 60 frames per second and its use of animations from the PlayStation version. He considered it a "major leap forward" in handheld gaming. Game Informer editor-in-chief Andrew Reiner praised the visuals for managing to feel three-dimensional, as well as for its use of transparency to see the character when they move behind objects, stating that the visuals left him in awe over how impressive they were. Two reviewers in Weekly Famitsu complimented the smooth movements of the polygonal skaters in the game as a showcase to the power of the GBA.

Tony Hawk's Pro Skater 2 was considered an exemplar of handheld conversions of console titles by multiple critics. Jonathan Metts felt that the issues of such conversions came from a combination of hardware limitations and developers not wanting to make console-type games on handhelds. He praised Vicarious Visions for both the execution of the game on a technical level, as well as its courage for having attempted to create something like it in the first place. GameSpot writer Jeff Gerstmann was similarly critical of trends regarding handheld ports, claiming that developers tended to "[duplicate] one or two key aspects of the original game and freestyle the rest" with mixed results. He considered it a benchmark for such games, as well as the best handheld skateboarding game ever made. In his retrospective, Luke Plunkett of Kotaku felt that the game had aged better visually than the console versions, remarking that games like this had to be more inventive in how it scaled down a console game compared to newer games.

== Legacy ==
Vicarious Visions' implementation of C++ for the GBA prompted Nintendo to disseminate the process on its internal website for other developers. Vicarious Visions went on to work on other Tony Hawk games for the GBA, excluding Tony Hawk's Downhill Jam, instead developing the Nintendo DS version. The 3D engine created for this game was used for future Vicarious Visions projects on the GBA, including Crash Bandicoot: The Huge Adventure, Jet Grind Radio, and Tony Hawk's Pro Skater 3, the latter which had an internal 3D level editor they used to make level design more intuitive.
