= Skylanders: Swap Force =

2013 video game

- Developers: Vicarious Visions; Beenox n-Space (3DS)
- Publisher: Activision
- Director: Jeremy Russo
- Producers: Eric Carter; Nick Ruepp; Chris Wilson; Dawn Pinkney
- Designer: Mike Stout
- Artists: Steven Olds; Dave E. Phillips; Lee Harker
- Composer: Lorne Balfe
- Series: Skylanders
- Engine: Vicarious Visions Alchemy
- Platforms: Nintendo 3DS; PlayStation 3; PlayStation 4; Wii; Wii U; Xbox 360; Xbox One
- Release: Nintendo 3DS, PlayStation 3, Wii, Wii U, Xbox 360: NA: October 13, 2013; AU: October 16, 2013; EU: October 18, 2013; PlayStation 4: NA: November 15, 2013; EU: November 29, 2013; AU: December 5, 2013; Xbox One: WW: November 22, 2013
- Genres: Role-playing, Platformer
- Modes: Single-player, multiplayer

Skylanders: Swap Force is a 2013 platform game developed by Vicarious Visions and Beenox and published by Activision. It is the third main game in the Skylanders video game and toy franchise, following 2012's Skylanders: Giants, which was a sequel to 2011's Skylanders: Spyro's Adventure.

== Gameplay ==
The gameplay of Swap Force is based on the two previous games, Skylanders: Spyro's Adventure and Skylanders: Giants, with the Skylanders gaining the new ability to jump without needing a bounce pad. Players use a portal to bring real-life figures into the game; Swap Force introduces a Portal of Power that can handle up to 16 figures on the portal at once, as opposed to the previous portals that can only handle 4 figures at once. This change to the Portal of Power comes as a result of the new characters: The Swap Force, who have unique top and bottom halves that can be separated from each other and recombined with halves from other characters. In total, there are 256 combinations between the top and bottom halves. The Swap Force characters also have eight distinct ways of moving tied to their bottom halves, which are necessary to enter side areas called "Swap Zone Challenges". These are Rocket, Spin, Dig, Stealth, Teleportation, Bounce, Speed and Climb.

== Plot ==
=== Premise ===
For years, the Swap Force protected the volcano that replenishes Skylands' magic every hundred years. However, following a battle, they were caught in the eruption, which blasted them apart, sent them to Earth, and gave them the ability to swap powers. The Skylanders must prevent the Elementals from being evilized, stop Kaos, and save the Skylands.

=== Characters ===
SWAP Force features sixteen new core characters and sixteen new swappable characters, in addition to sixteen reposed Skylanders from previous games. The sixteen new swappable characters are Wash Buckler, Blast Zone, Free Ranger, Freeze Blade, Night Shift, Magna Charge, Stink Bomb, Rattle Shake, Hoot Loop, Trap Shadow, Grilla Drilla, Spy Rise, Rubble Rouser, Doom Stone, Boom Jet and Fire Kraken. The sixteen new core characters are Bumble Blast, Countdown, Dune Bug, Fryno, Grim Creeper, Pop Thorn, Punk Shock, Rip Tide, Roller Brawl, Scorp, Scratch, Slobber Tooth, Smolderdash, Star Strike, Wind Up, and Zoo Lou.

=== Synopsis ===
Every 100 years, the Elementals, a group of four ancient creatures consisting of the Flashfin, the Terrasquid, the Frost Hound, and the Tree Spirit, unite to replenish the Skylands' magic through Mount Cloudbreak. During the last eruption ceremony, Kaos' mother Kaossandra tried to destroy the volcano, but a team of Skylanders defended it. Following the volcano's eruption, they were sent to Earth and gained the ability to swap their tops and bottoms, transforming them into the SWAP Force.

100 years later, Captain Flynn goes to see the eruption and finds a girl named Tessa, who is being pursued by a fleet of monsters called Greebles and explains her home is in danger. Although he succeeds in driving them off with help from the Skylanders, his ship is damaged in the crash. Afterwards, Flynn and Tessa arrive at her home village of Woodburrow and meet the village crier, Rufus. They learn that the chieftess has been captured and Kaos has created a device called the Evilizer, which uses Petrified Darkness to turn others into stronger and more aggressive crystal versions of themselves.

The Skylanders rescue the chieftess and bring her back to the village. However, Kaos has learned of the Elemental's whereabouts and plans to evilize one of them, which will cause Mount Cloudbreak to turn evil and spread Darkness across Skylands. Glumshanks begins to doubt Kaos's ability to take over the Skylands, so Kaos evilizes him and sends him to his dig site. Tessa leads the Skylanders to Mudwater Hollow, the location of the Flashfin, to stop Kaos from evilizing it. They make their way to Kaos' dig site and stop the operation; in the process, they defeat Glumshanks and turn him back to normal.

Glumshanks returns to Kaos, who is disappointed by his failure, and is greeted by Kaossandra, who mocks him for his incompetence. The Skylanders attempt to find the Terrasquid and make their way to the town of Motleyville hoping to get help from its baron, Sharpfin. When they arrive, Baron Von Shellshock, a servant of Kaos, evilizes Tessa's bird Whiskers and sends him to attack them. After dealing with Shellshock and turning Whiskers back to normal, Sharpfin promises to help the Skylanders find the Terrasquid and sends his crew to fix Flynn's ship. They arrive at the location of the Terrasquid, where they fight the Fire Viper; afterwards, Kaossandra shows up at Kaos' lair to help him.

Sharpfin takes Flynn and the Skylanders to a small elf village in the tundra, where they meet the frost elf Avril. After helping her deal with a cyclops invasion in her village, she tells them the Frost Hound is located in the Frostfest Mountains. The Skylanders make their way to the Frost Hound, where Kaossandra sends her servant Mesmerelda to attack them, but they defeat her and rescue the Frost Hound.

Kaos then attacks Fantasm Forest, the home of the Tree Spirit, using Petrified Darkness as a fuel source to evilize her and burn down her domain. The Skylanders make their way to the forest and defeat the trolls while capturing Kaos. The eruption ceremony begins as the chieftess names Tessa the new chieftess of Woodburrow and the Elementals go to begin the eruption. However, Kaossandra shows up and takes back Kaos while kidnapping Tessa. Using Flynn's newly repaired ship, the Skylanders, Flynn and Sharpfin make their way to Kaos' fortress and defeat Kaossandra, imprisoning her in a mirror prison and rescuing Tessa. Kaos reveals that he filled the volcano with Petrified Darkness to turn it into a massive Evilizer.

As Flynn, Sharpfin, and Tessa go with the Skylanders into the volcano, Kaos tells Glumshanks to finish the pile of Petrified Darkness. However, after the pile falls down on top of him, he is transformed into a giant Evilized version of himself known as "Super Evil Kaos". The Skylanders defeat him and destroy the crystals on his body, reverting him to normal. They escape the volcano and Kaos and Glumshanks discover they have been swapped. The volcano then erupts, replenishing the magic in Skylands as everyone celebrates.

=== 3DS plot ===
In another part of Skylands, Hugo, Flynn and Cali visit Flynn's hometown, Boomtown, where the people are celebrating in his honor. The celebration is interrupted when Count Moneybone, the lord of the Undead, attacks, stealing Flynn's statue and turning Cali into an undead. The Skylanders and the Swap Force must stop Moneybone before he turns all of Skylands undead.

== Starter Packs ==
As with the previous installments of the game, Skylanders: SWAP Force is available for purchase in starter kits that include a copy of the game itself, the Portal of Power, three characters to begin or supplement a player's collection, a poster of the entire SWAP Force collection, cards, stickers, and Web codes

== Development ==
Swap Force was the first game in the series for which Vicarious Visions led home console development, a role previously held by Toys for Bob. Visual development director Brent Gibson said work began while Skylanders: Spyro's Adventure was still being completed, and that the studio drew on its earlier version of Nintendo 3DS version of that game, the Wii U version of Skylanders: Giants and the mobile titles Cloud Patrol, Battlegrounds and Lost Islands.

The concept originated after the cancellation of the studio's Guitar Hero project in early 2011. The team was split in two, with engineers working out how interchangeable figure halves could function while designers explored what the mechanic would mean in play; an early prototype was a mound of clay joined by an audio jack. The idea was proven when Gibson assembled a magnet-jointed figure from the head of Spyro, the torso of Prism Break and the legs of Voodood. The team settled on two-part characters roughly a quarter of the way through development.

Game director Jermey Russo said that although most early attention went to the swapping mechanic, the addition of jumping - absent from the console versions of the previous two games - rose quickly to the top of the list of other improvements. Because the series was not aimed at experienced players of platformers, the team tested jump distance and height extensivley with children, moving the more demanding platforming into optional areas.

The Wii U version uses the Wii U GamePad to display Skylander stats, level objectives and a leaderboard of Nintendo Network friends, and supports off-television play. The Wii version was developed by Beenox.

=== Audio ===
The score for the game was composed by Lorne Balfe, with a theme written by Hans Zimmer. It also includes the song Muddywatta Holla performed by The Broombusters and Pull Your Strings performed by Nancy Anderson, with lyrics written by David A. Rodriguez and music by Matt Pirog.

== Reception ==
Reception

Aggregate scores
Aggregator	Score
Metacritic	X360: 83/100; WIIU: 89/100; PS3: 83/100; PS4: 79/100; 3DS: 68/100
OpenCritic	94% recommend

Review scores
Publication	Score
Destructoid	X360: 8.5/10
Eurogamer	8/10
Game Informer	8.5/10
GameRevolution	PS3: 8/10
GameSpot	PS3: 7/10
GamesRadar+	X360: 4/5
IGN	8.2/10; 3DS: 7.1/10
Joystiq	X360: 4.5/5
Nintendo Life	WIIU: 9/10; 3DS: 6/10
Nintendo World Report	WIIU: 8.5/10; 3DS: 6/10
PlayStation Official Magazine – UK	PS3: 7/10
Official Xbox Magazine (UK)	XONE: 7/10
Official Xbox Magazine (US)	X360: 7.5/10
Pocket Gamer	3DS: 3.5/5
Polygon	X360: 7.5/10
Push Square	PS4: 6/10
The Guardian	X360: 4/5
VentureBeat	PS3: 90/100
VideoGamer.com	X360: 9/10

Skylanders: Swap Force received "generally favorable" reviews for most platforms according to review aggregator website Metacritic; the Nintendo 3DS version received "mixed or average" reviews. The Metacritic scores for the game were the highest and most positive of the series on most platforms. Gaming website Quarter to Three gave both the Wii U and Xbox 360 a perfect score of 5/5. Video game website Gaming Age gave the PlayStation 3 version the highest grade of an "A" and further commented that "whether you're a Skylanders fan or a gamer who's looking for a charming and unique family-friendly game series to get into, Skylanders Swap Force comes highly recommended."

During the 17th Annual D.I.C.E. Awards, the Academy of Interactive Arts & Sciences nominated Skylanders: Swap Force for "Family Game of the Year".
