= Terminus (2000 video game) =

2000 video game

- North American box art
- Developer: Vicarious Visions
- Publisher: Vatical Entertainment
- Designer: Terminus Team
- Programmer: Dave Calvin
- Composer: Todd Masten
- Platforms: Microsoft Windows; Macintosh; Linux
- Release: WW: June 29, 2000
- Genres: Role-playing, space flight simulator
- Modes: Single-player, multiplayer

Terminus is a space-flight role-playing action video game by Vicarious Visions. It was released in 2000 for Microsoft Windows, Linux, and Apple Macintosh. Terminus won awards in the 1999 Independent Games Festival for "Technical Excellence" and "Innovation in Audio".

== Gameplay ==
In Story mode, the player chooses one of four careers (United Earth League military, Mars Consortium militia, Marauder Pirate Clan, mercenary) and follows Terminus's single-player storyline, set in the year 2197. In 2000, Terminus was unusual among RPGs in that the player's actions can affect the ending of the storyline. Failing a mission, for example, may lead to a different ending than would have occurred if the mission had succeeded. One unique feature of Terminus is the story would progress with or without the player. The player could begin the game in story mode, then go off and do something else and the story missions/battles would still take place, reaching an outcome depending on which side eventually wins.

In Free mode, the player chooses a career and does the same as in Story mode, except there will be no storyline missions. In Gauntlet mode, the player outfits a ship with near-infinite money at their disposal, and faces several waves of attackers, with the object of staying alive for as long as possible.

== Development ==
Terminus was our passion project. It was huge and complex. We really didn't know how to make a game of that size. It was incredibly innovative and took four years to make. In 1999, we entered the first Independent Games Festival at GDC. Terminus won two awards – Best Programming and Best Audio. It "put us on the map" and gave us visibility amongst the big game publishers. But getting anyone to publish such a risky & ambitious title proved to be very difficult. We had to get some other paying gigs to keep Terminus alive and get it published!

— Vicarious Visions, Our Culture: Indie Days 1999-2004.

Polygon explained that Vicarious Visions' first major game "following the publishing debacle during college", was the space combat role-playing video game Terminus. President Karthik Bala said "We ended up getting a personal bank loan for a million dollars. We knew if we didn't figure this out and make it work, we'd be screwed for the rest of our lives." The duo of developers had been left with a mountain of debt from development costs on Synnergist due to the publishers not giving them royalties for the game, and began work on this project on 1996.

Back in January 1998, the "Vicarious Visions' seven full-time employees and squadron of contractors" were laboring to complete the game, which at the time was to be the company's second release. At that point "The development budget for Terminus ha[d] already crossed the $250,000 mark with months' more work to be done before an expected September 1998 release." Bala said at the time "Terminus will include not only network and Internet play, which is becoming almost standard in games, but also the capability for players to communicate by voice." Bala retrospectively said "The Department of Defense had recently declassified an audio compression algorithm that we ended up using and writing Voice over IP within our game at the time. We did some really cool stuff primarily because it hadn't been done." As a contest finalist at the first annual Independent Games Festival (the game ended up taking home two awards), "Terminus was exhibited on the show floor at the Game Developers Conference, March 16–18 in San Jose, Calif." Polygon explained that despite winning some industry awards, "publishers were reluctant to take on the project [and] when Vatival Entertainment finally shipped the game in 2000, it hardly sold." By 1999, the company employed 15 people, "including four Rensselaer graduates and two undergrads".

Terminus is notable for its implementation of Newtonian laws of motion, which means that objects are subject to inertia. Once accelerated, they float indefinitely in one direction unless again accelerated into a different direction. This makes steering quite complicated, but mirrors actual behavior in free space. BarrysWorld explains "The game has a newtonian (i.e 'realistic') flight model, that is to say that the ships will not fly like jet planes but they will actually obey the laws of Newtonian physics. In order to go in another direction you'll need to slowdown to a stop and then go in the direction that you want to move in. All this will be accomplished by a kind of reaction control system autopilot that attempts to keep you moving in the direction you are pointing." The site added "Terminus should be the first of a series of sims that will encourage 'l33t' skillz to master."

Support for Terminus has long since ended. Although the game is still licensed by Vicarious Visions, the source code was licensed to the owner of the TerminusPoint website to allow continued development of the game and thus has been improved and enhanced. Although the client files are still available at the TerminusPoint website, the project has seemingly been abandoned.

== Reception ==
Reception

Aggregate score
| Aggregator | Score | |
| Aggregator | Macintosh | PC |
|---|---|---|
| GameRankings | 70% | 72% |

Review scores
| Publication | Score | |
| Publication | Macintosh | PC |
|---|---|---|
| CNET Gamecenter | N/A | 6/10 |
| Computer Games Strategy Plus | N/A | 3.5/5 |
| EP Daily | 7/10 | 7/10 |
| Game Informer | N/A | 8.75/10 |
| GameSpot | N/A | 6.5/10 |
| GameSpy | N/A | 75% |
| IGN | N/A | 8/10 |
| MacLife | "F.A." | N/A |
| PC Gamer (US) | N/A | 41% |
| PC Zone | N/A | 86% |

At the time of its release, the game received above-average reviews on both platforms according to the review aggregation website GameRankings.

PC Zone said, "Overall, while not as flashy as other recent space-sims, Terminus has lots of substance. It packs so much into the game." GameSpy said, "With Terminus, Vicarious Visions has raised the bar of excellence within three simultaneous genres, but couldn't quite glue all the pieces together into a cohesive whole." Gamer's Pulse said, "In the end, Terminus failed to truly excite me. That's not to say that the game isn't fun to play; it does offer a good time to the pilot within us all." Computer Games Strategy Plus said, "When everything is said and done, Terminus comes out looking-and feeling-good." GameSpot wrote, "Terminus offers flawed but nonetheless decent space combat action, along with an impressive online play feature. The game ought to be appealing on account of this and its cross-platform compatibility, but its glitches and general lack of polish considerably diminish its overall quality." MacADDICT called it "an intermittently fantastic game that should appeal to flight-sim jockeys, hardcore sci-fi fans, and anyone who's ever wanted to wield two joysticks."

=== Awards and nominations ===
| Year | Award | Category | Result | Ref |
|---|---|---|---|---|
| 1999 | Independent Games Festival Awards | Technical Excellence ($3,000) | Won | |
| 1999 | Independent Games Festival Awards | Excellence In Audio ($3,000) | Won | |
