= Guitar Hero: On Tour =

2008 video game series

- The cover of the first game, Guitar Hero: On Tour
- Genre: Music
- Developer: Vicarious Visions (Note: Development of Guitar Hero: On Tour was assisted by Nintendo and RedOctane.)
- Publisher: Activision
- Platform: Nintendo DS
- First release: Guitar Hero: On Tour; June 22, 2008
- Latest release: Guitar Hero On Tour: Modern Hits; June 9, 2009
- Parent series: Guitar Hero

Guitar Hero: On Tour is a series of music video games based on the Guitar Hero series for the Nintendo DS handheld game system. The series is developed by Vicarious Visions and published by Activision. Three games in the series have been released since June 2008: Guitar Hero: On Tour, Guitar Hero On Tour: Decades, and Guitar Hero On Tour: Modern Hits.

As with other games in the Guitar Hero series, the player is challenged to play through the lead or bass guitar portions of rock songs by matching colored notes that scroll on screen towards the player in time with physical actions to score points and keep the virtual crowd pleased. While the console versions of Guitar Hero use a separate guitar-shaped peripheral, Vicarious Visions developed a "Guitar Grip" unit that slips into the Game Boy Advance port on the DS or the DS Lite and is required to be used with the games; it is thus incompatible with the Nintendo DSi, Nintendo DSi XL, or any Nintendo 3DS. The Guitar Grip provides a strap to hold the game unit while providing the player with four fret buttons; the player uses the fret buttons in combination with using the stylus to simulate strumming on the touch-sensitive screen of the DS. Each game features more than 25 songs, with some variation in track lists depending on the region of release, and multiple single-player modes. The local wi-fi capabilities of the DS are used for multiplayer mode, and allow a player to use songs from one installment of the series in competitive modes with a player with a different installment.

== Gameplay ==
Screenshot of the two DS screens during gameplay of Guitar Hero: On Tour. The right screen is presented on the touchscreen side of the DS, containing the guitar neck to strum and a HUD.

The core gameplay remains unchanged from the other games in the series. The Guitar Grip is required to play the game and comes as part of a bundle that can be purchased for each installment. The Grip is designed for the DS Lite, but features a small adapter that can be removed for use in the first, original Nintendo DS model. Four fret buttons are located on the side of the unit near the cartridge slot. This is one less than the normal five frets, included an orange-colored one, managed by other Guitar Hero controllers. A wriststrap is attached to the underside to provide support while playing. The player holds the unit in a vertical book orientation (similar to Ninja Gaiden: Dragon Sword or Hotel Dusk: Room 215), and uses a special guitar pick-shaped stylus to strum on the touchscreen of the DS with their free hand. The "note highway" and the performance of the chosen character in the band are shown on the opposite screen. As notes scroll down on the note highway, the player must press the correct fret button and strum the touchscreen at the same time to successfully score points. While holding a long note, the player can also use the touch screen to apply a whammy effect by moving the stylus across the on-screen whammy bar or anywhere on the screen. After the player has successfully hit a selected series of notes, they will gain "Star Power" which doubles their score until the meter has run out. This is activated by yelling or blowing into the DS's microphone, by pressing any of the face buttons on the DS, or by tapping the Star Power meter on the touchscreen.

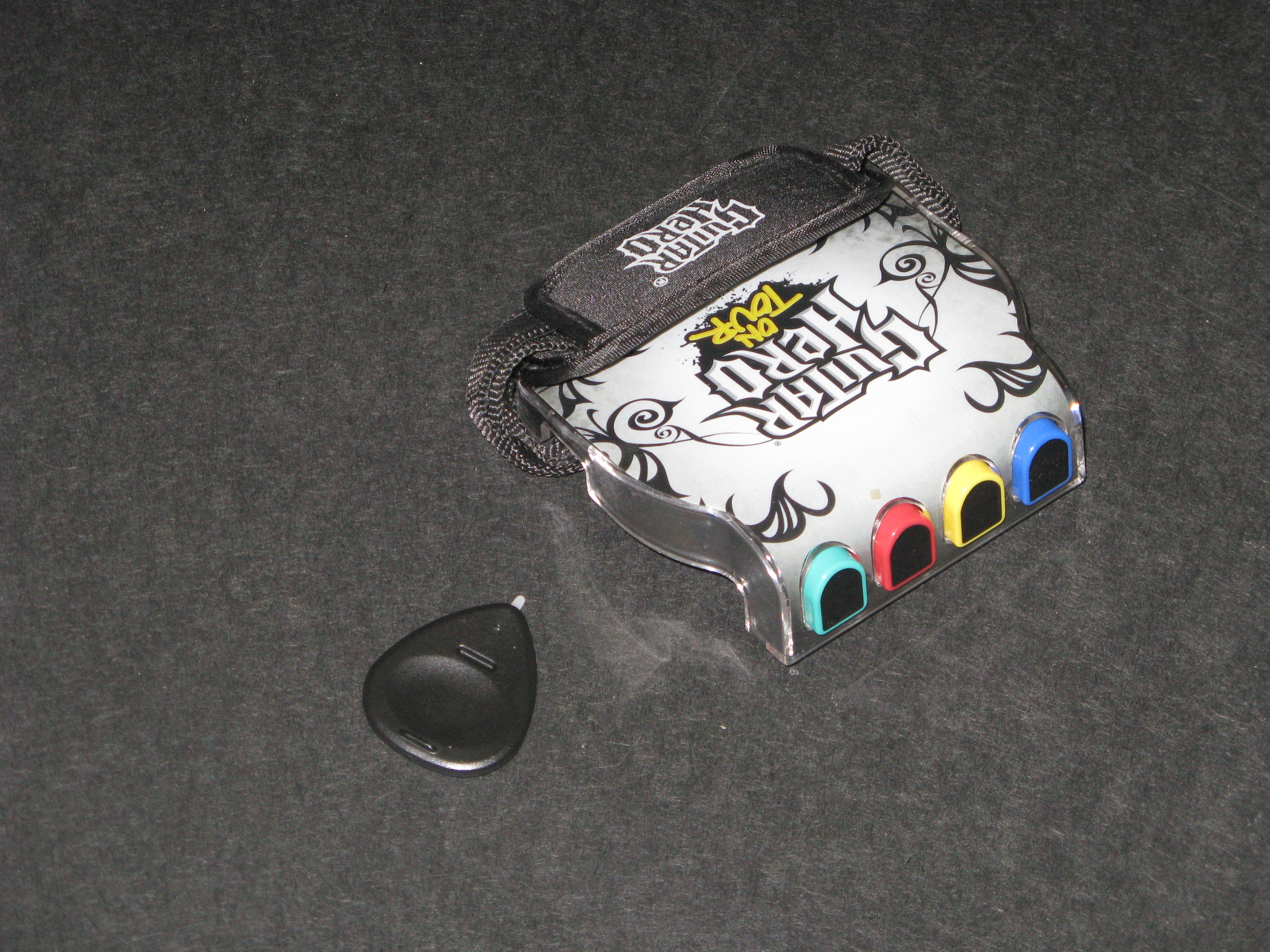
Unlike its predecessors on home consoles, On Tour has only four fret buttons.

There is a single player Career Mode, allowing the player to select from new characters introduced for On Tour or previous characters from the other games in the Guitar Hero series. Completing Career Mode will unlock more venues and options for the selected character's appearance. The game uses the local wireless abilities of the Nintendo DS to support both 2-player co-operative play and competitive play. The competitive play introduces concepts found in Guitar Hero III: Legends of Rock's "Battle Mode" which is called "Guitar Duel". In Guitar Duel, one player can acquire and use power-ups to create a temporary distraction for the other player by successfully completing certain sections of the song. In On Tour, these distractions require the affected player to use features of the DS to remove the distraction. Modern Hits introduces a new single player gameplay feature called "Fan Requests" that is used to progress in the single player career. These requests prompt the player to complete songs with certain requirements, such as hitting a minimum number of consecutive notes or hitting a minimum percentage of the notes in the song. Other requests are based on the effects players use in multiplayer mode, such as playing an entire song at "Hyperspeed" (notes moving on the screen faster than normal) or by using the whammy bar on every sustained note.

== Development ==
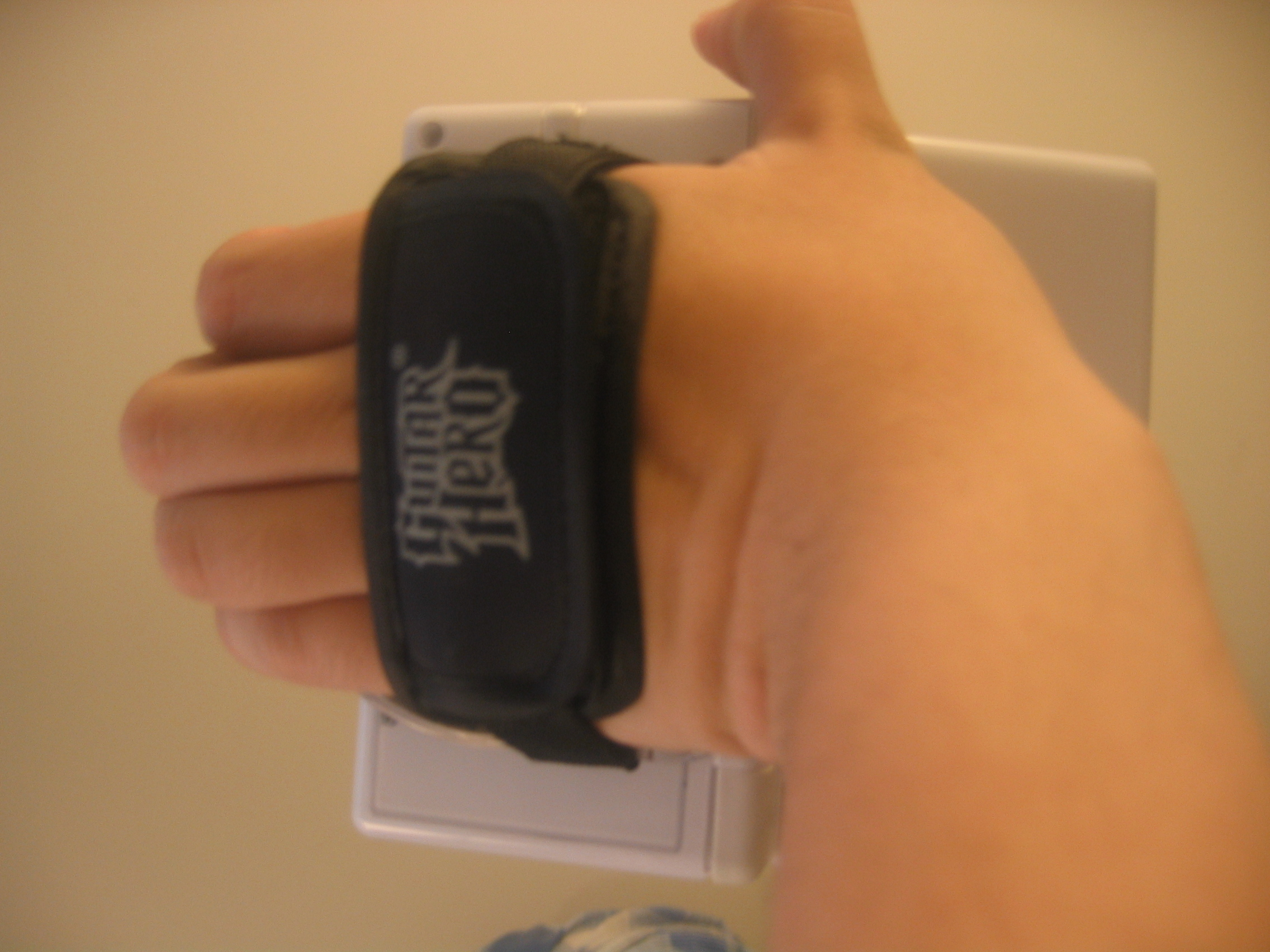
Holding DS, showing the Guitar Grip strap

Work on a Nintendo DS version of Guitar Hero started in early 2007 according to Vicarious Visions CEO, Karthik Bala. Bala stated that the inspiration for the game was to "see if it was even possible to do a really good music rhythm game on a handheld". The first six months of development were "touch and go", according to Bala, and it took nearly a year of testing and experimentation to determine the best strumming mechanism for the game. Bala claimed that Vicarious Visions had gone through more than 20 different combinations of software and hardware peripherals until they "hit upon the idea of creating a peripheral that would have the fret buttons plugging into the GBA slot of the DS". This also gave the advantage of making the peripheral compact, allowing it to be easily carried by the user. Other designs that were tested but dropped included a larger guitar-shaped unit that the DS was attached to (dubbed "Ukulele Hero" by the design team), different grips with three to six to twelve buttons, and gameplay that was built only around using the stylus. Vicarious Visions only approached Nintendo and RedOctane after the initial prototype was done; both companies were skeptical of the game but helped to support the team, Nintendo by assisting in the hardware interaction with the DS, and RedOctane by helping with the ergonomics of the Guitar Grip. This peripheral is not compatible with the Nintendo DSi because it lacks a GBA slot to insert the grip into, but Vicarious Visions has stated that it is eager to continue development of the series on the DSi.

The Guitar Grip provides four fret buttons for the player, allowing them to strum on the DS touchscreen.

Even with the hardware designed, Vicarious Visions spent additional time refining the game play. According to lead designer Jeremy Russo, the team had the largest number of playtesters brought in for any Vicarious Vision project in order to refine the touchscreen "strumming" action, using a range of testers, including those that had never played a Guitar Hero game, the "'DragonForce' Expert" players, and real guitar players. In addition, the team wanted to expand the "Guitar Duel" mode to include several DS-specific mini-games that could not be recreated on other consoles, but found themselves running out of time. RedOctane wanted to see On Tour as a "polished AAA title on a handheld" and insisted that the "Guitar Duel" be a key feature of the game, giving Vicarious Visions more time to complete the game. The additional time allowed the team to develop the software to recognize every type of strumming approach, including finding a solution to handle the expert players that strummed faster than could be previously recognized. This time also was used to strengthen the "Guitar Duel" gameplay, and as a result, this mode became the testers' favorite feature of the game. While some tracks were brought over from Guitar Hero III: Legends of Rock, Vicarious Visions recreated all the note tracks for the game, aiming to keep the same difference in difficulty from Easy to Expert as in the console versions. Each song has been divided into three separate compressed tracks that play back simultaneously during gameplay. Vicarious Visions developed a method to overcome the 2,000-polygon drawing limit imposed by the Nintendo DS hardware in order to allow the characters, each composed of about 2,000 polygons, to be recognizable.

Bala stated that Vicarious Visions envisioned the "On Tour" series as a trilogy, and despite the availability of the DSi before the release of "Modern Hits", it wanted to finish out the series on the DS system. While Bala has not revealed what plans the development team has for the DSi for Guitar Hero, they have used their experience in creating the DSiWare game Mixed Messages to prepare for further Guitar Hero games on the unit, including the possibility of downloadable content. Much of the core aspects of the On Tour series will be reused in the DS version of Band Hero, also being developed in part by Vicarious Visions; the game will reutilize the "Guitar Grip" while adding drumming support through a "drum skin" and vocals through the DS' microphone, and support for four player localized play has been included.

=== On Tour ===
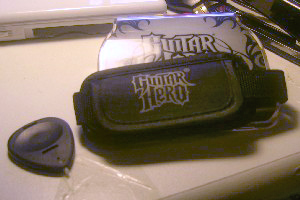
The Guitar Grip with pick stylus

Guitar Hero: On Tour was officially announced on September 7, 2007, at the Austin GDC '07, and released on June 22, 2008. During a conference call on May 8, 2008, Activision revealed that the game would be sold as an individual game (along with the "Guitar Grip") as well as bundled with the DS hardware itself. In North America, Nintendo released a bundle which included Guitar Hero: On Tour and a limited edition Silver/Black Nintendo DS Lite branded with the Guitar Hero logo. This bundle was available with the release of Guitar Hero: On Tour in the United Kingdom. This is the first third-party DS game to be included in such a bundle. When pre-ordered in certain stores, the consumer received either a special Guitar Hero: On Tour set of headphones, Nintendo DS Lite "wrap" pack (two stickers for use on the console) or an exclusive guitar pick stylus. The headphones and stylus feature the Guitar Hero: On Tour logo. On June 14, Toys "R" Us stores across the US hosted a "First to Play" event, where players tried out the game more than a week before its release. Also at the event, anyone who attended received a free Guitar Hero sticker, a temporary tattoo, and a special dog tag.

=== Decades ===
Guitar Hero On Tour: Decades was announced on July 15, 2008, at the 2008 E3 conference, and released on November 16, 2008. Executive Producer David Nathanielsz stated that the short time between releases was to help give DS players the same depth of content as available to the console players of Guitar Hero. Additionally, Vicarious Visions incorporated the ability to share songs between different versions of the game through the wi-fi capabilities of the DS in order to expand the number of potential songs to more than 50.

=== Modern Hits ===
Guitar Hero On Tour: Modern Hits was announced on March 5, 2009, and released on June 9, 2009. Reflecting its title, Modern Hits incorporates songs published within the last five years of its release, and the developers had to balance what songs were included in order to make a setlist with a wide appeal. The engine of the game has no major changes, but Vicarious Visions stated that it has continued to work on strum detection on the DS touchpad to meet a wide range of playstyles. The interface, however, has been revised over the previous two On Tour titles to feature a more modernized look (particularly in-game on the touch screen side). The game includes a new single player career progression using "Fan Requests" to create a new non-linear progression through the songs in the games. These were added to help move away from gameplay that was "just going, playing a venue, and then moving on to the next one" and instead to "open the world up". The developers also noted that the Fan Requests helped to tap into the way that players had previously played games in the series, setting their own personal goals for certain songs. Audio designer Jason Willey created the game's theme song (titled "S.U.P.R.A.H.U.M.A.N.") through his two-man band, Protoshredanoid, to capture the Modern Hits theme of the game, and after demonstrating a sampling of the song to the rest of the team, were asked to create the whole song. The theme song was released as a free download for Guitar Hero World Tour the week before the game's release.

=== Band Hero ===
In addition to the above games, a Nintendo DS version of Band Hero was also released. It is compatible with the On Tour Guitar Grip, as well as a unique "Drum Skin" and microphone support, but is not considered part of the On Tour series.

== Soundtracks ==
Each game in the series contains 25 or more songs, generally consisting of rock music over the past 50 years. The songlist varies; some songs replace others depending on the region of release. On Tour used a number of cover versions of the songs in addition to master recordings, while both Decades and Modern Hits feature complete soundtracks based on master recordings. The games support the local wi-fi connection of the Nintendo DS to allow players to play against each other even if using different versions of the game, with songs being share in an ad hoc manner during play.

== Reception ==
=== Reviews of On Tour ===
Reception

Aggregate scores
Aggregator	Score
GameRankings	73%
Metacritic	72/100

Review scores
Publication	Score
1Up.com	B−
GameSpot	6.0/10
GameSpy	7.0/10
GameTrailers	7.7/10
IGN	9.0/10

Guitar Hero: On Tour received somewhat positive reviews. In general, critics felt the game captured the majority of the elements of the Guitar Hero series, and IGN commented that the note tracks were well done as to provide "a great challenge with a solid difficulty curve". However, the primary concern of reviewers was the Guitar Grip, as it was both difficult to hold and caused hand cramps in some players. The Grip was also reported to seat poorly in the GBA slot and came out of the unit at times, which caused the game to stop unexpectedly, requiring a restart of the system due to its inability to support hot swapping. Reviews reported difficulty in keeping the DS unit steady while playing with the Grip, making it difficult to follow the note patterns on the screen. Reviewers found the set list to be both short and somewhat skewed towards recent music, and some commented that the sound quality of the tracks was poor. The multiplayer aspects of the game were well received. While some reviewers considered the game as an "absolute Guitar Hero experience", others noted that the social aspect of the series was not present, and that the game felt "more like an experiment than a full-fledged game, as if Activision just wanted to see if it could be pulled off."

Guitar Hero: On Tour has won several Nintendo awards from IGN for their 2008 Nintendo DS Best of 2008 feature, including Best Music/Rhythm Game, Most Innovative Design, and Best Local Multiplayer. It was also nominated for several other Nintendo DS awards, including Best Use of Sound, Best Graphics Technology, and Game of the Year.

The game was the top selling DS game in North America the week of its release, selling over 300,000 units, and setting the record for any Activision DS release and as one of the top five releases from Activision on any platform. The game continued to be the best selling DS title in North America in its second week of release. On Tour was the second best-selling game across all systems for the month of June 2008, according to the NPD Group selling more than 422,000 units. In July and August 2008, it sold an additional 309,700 and 110,000 units in North America, respectively, placing on NPD's top ten game sales for both months. The worldwide release of On Tour took in over $15 million in sales during the month of July 2008. The bundled version of Guitar Hero: On Tour is the 19th best-selling Nintendo DS game in the United States, selling 1.1 million copies as of November 2008.

=== Reviews of Decades ===
Reviews

Aggregate scores
Aggregator	Score
GameRankings	78%
Metacritic	76/100

Review scores
Publication	Score
1Up.com	B−
GameSpot	6.0/10
IGN	8.0/10

Decades received better reviews than On Tour, with reviewers noting that the game, released only a short time after the original On Tour, felt more like an expansion pack than a new title. Critics noted that there was no change in the hardware design and the gameplay mechanics, such that the same issues with hand-cramping and the inability to keep the DS steady while playing still persisted in Decades. Reviewers did praise the compatibility with the previous On Tour title, the improved touch screen interface, and the ability to play competitively with other users regardless of which version of the game they possessed.

The track list was considered to be well-rounded; IGN explained the game's track list "starts out bad but starts getting more enjoyable as you unlock the earlier decades" though attributed this partially to personal taste. However, reviewers also noted that with the songs presented in chronological order, the difficulty curve presented in other Guitar Hero games was not present. The poor audio quality of the songs, a problem that was also noted with On Tour, was found to persist in this sequel. Hyper's Tracey Lien commends the game for "staying as true to Guitar Hero as the DS can possibly allow" but criticises it for "major hand cramps, poor song selection, and too few tracks!"

=== Reviews of Modern Hits ===
Reception

Aggregate scores
Aggregator	Score
GameRankings	71.5%
Metacritic	70/100

Review scores
Publication	Score
Eurogamer	7/10
IGN	7.8/10
Nintendo Power	7/10

Modern Hits received moderate reviews from the gaming press. The game's change of form from having fixed set lists that must be completed to advance to the fan requests system was found to be tedious to work through the game in this fashion, according to IGN's Craig Harris. Albert García of Eurogamer considered that the series is still lacking features found in the console-based games, but remains a consistent "little brother" to the main series' titles. The soundtrack was considered to have stronger guitar portions than from previous games, but still felt like a "disco" collection. Modern Hits was criticized in part for being a "victim of Nintendo's timing", according to Harris, as the game was released shortly after the arrival of the Nintendo DSi unit, which lacks the necessary port to use the Guitar Grip, thus making Modern Hits unplayable on the system.
