= Spyborgs =

2009 video game

- Developer: Bionic Games
- Publisher: Capcom
- Directors: Lloyd Murphy; Michael Stout
- Designer: Mark C. Stuart
- Writer: Meghan Heritage
- Composer: Clark Crawford
- Platform: Wii
- Release: NA: September 22, 2009; AU: September 24, 2009; EU: September 25, 2009
- Genre: Beat 'em up
- Modes: Single-player, Multiplayer

Spyborgs is a beat 'em up video game for the Wii developed by American studio Bionic Games and published by Capcom. It was released in September 2009.

== Gameplay ==
Gameplay screenshot

Spyborgs sees players controlling a member of a team of cyborg secret agents, each with their own unique abilities, through several levels populated by enemies. The game is designed to be played cooperatively with two players, though the AI will take control of the other character in single player games. Players can also gain experience points to upgrade their character's abilities.

For each level, players can choose two out of the three Spyborgs, which include:

- Clandestine, a quick and nimble female ninja.
- Bouncer, a lumbering but powerful robot.
- Stinger, a soldier with a cybernetic gun arm.

Played using the Wii Remote, motion controls initiate special attacks while the two characters can team up their attacks for additional damage. Alternatively, players can also choose to play with the buttons on the Wii Remote instead.

== Development ==
Initially announced in June 2008 at Capcom's Captivate event, Spyborgs underwent a major redesign after a lukewarm reception from the gaming press. Changes include a shift from bright cartoony graphics reminiscent of Saturday morning cartoon shows, to a grittier and more realistic visual look, as well as the removal of minigames which served as parodies of children's toy commercials. The current game also shifted focus from an action-oriented game with superpower-based puzzle elements to a brawler.

The game was developed in an internal engine designed by Bionic Games, not MT Framework.

Bionic Games shut down after Spyborgs was released, making it their only title.

== Reception ==
Reception

Aggregate score
| Aggregator | Score |
|---|---|
| Metacritic | 66/100 |

Review scores
| Publication | Score |
|---|---|
| 1Up.com | B− |
| Eurogamer | 5/10 |
| GamePro | 3.5/5 |
| GameSpot | 6/10 |
| GameTrailers | 5.5/10 |
| GameZone | 6/10 |
| IGN | 7.5/10 |
| Nintendo Power | 7.5/10 |
| Official Nintendo Magazine | 80% |
| VideoGamer.com | 6/10 |
| 411Mania | 7.5/10 |
| Teletext GameCentral | 5/10 |

Spyborgs received "average" reviews according to the review aggregation website Metacritic. IGN praised the game for its high quality graphics and large amount of polish. Despite this, IGN criticised the title for its punishing difficulty and lack of innovation. Eurogamer criticised the game for being generic.
