= Zebco Fishing =

1999 video game

- Developer: Vicarious Visions
- Publisher: Vatical Entertainment
- Platform: Game Boy Color
- Release: 15 October 1999
- Genre: Sports
- Mode: Single-player

Zebco Fishing (stylised as Zebco Fishing!) is a 1999 video game developed by Vicarious Visions and published by Vatical Entertainment for the Game Boy Color. It is a ZEBCO licensed fishing video game. Upon release, the game received mixed reviews.

== Gameplay ==
Gameplay screenshot

Players take control of a fishing boat and can choose to fish from two lakes: Lake Chestnut and Lake Drake. Fishing involves two stages: positioning a boat into location on the lake, then casting the line to hook and lure in a fish. Players use the control pad to move the boat, and position the cast of the fishing rod, and the A button to cast the line and reel in a fish. Caught fish have several properties depending on the weather conditions, time of day and depth of water, with players able to select and use eleven different lures effective under certain conditions. Zebco Fishing featured several game modes, including a Practice mode, Tournament Fishing, facing against other competitors, and Blackjack, requiring the player to catch as close to 21 pounds of bass without going over the limit. The game cartridge supported a built-in rumble, causing it to vibrate when a fish bit the bait. The game also features digitised speech samples.

== Reception ==
Reception

Review scores
Publication	Score
AllGame	2.5/5
IGN	7/10
Nintendo Power	6.5/10
Pocket Magazine	1/5

Describing the game as fun and "easy to play", Adam Cleveland of IGN praised the game's "attractive" extras uncommon to the Game Boy, including its rumble as a "real rarity on the Game Boy Color [that] complements the feeling [of fishing] well", and the use of in-game speech. Similarly praising the rumble and "remarkable" spoken-word samples, Nintendo Power also praised the game's intuitive gameplay and colourful design, but felt the game had limited replay value and scope as a fishing game for general players. Pocket Magazine stated the game lacked game modes, environments and options, critiquing the "boring" gameplay and "static" scenery.
