= Proun+ =

2014 video game

- App icon
- Developer: Engine Software
- Publisher: Engine Software
- Series: Proun
- Platforms: iOS, Nintendo 3DS
- Release: iOS; November 27, 2014; 3DS eShop; March 5, 2015
- Genre: Racing
- Mode: Single-player

Proun+ is a racing game inspired by paintings by Piet Mondriaan and Wassily Kadinsky. It was developed and published by Engine Software for iOS and Nintendo 3DS in 2014-2015.

== Gameplay ==
In this game the player has to guide a ball racing along a pipe while dodging obstacles on the way.

== Reception ==
Reception

Aggregate score
Aggregator	Score
Metacritic	(iOS) 85/100 (3DS) 67/100

Review scores
Publication	Score
Famitsu	(3DS) 28/40
Gamezebo	(iOS) 90/100
Nintendo Life	(3DS)
Nintendo World Report	(3DS) 7.5/10
Pocket Gamer	(iOS)
TouchArcade	(iOS)

The iOS version received "favorable" reviews, while the 3DS version received "average" reviews, according to the review aggregation website Metacritic. In Japan, where the latter version was ported and published by Rainy Frog under the name Loop Line Racing (ループラインレーシング, Rūpu Rain Rēshingu) on June 10, 2015, Famitsu gave it a score of 28 out of 40.
