= The Wild Thornberrys: Rambler =

2000 video game

- Developers: Human Code (Windows); Vicarious Visions (GBC)
- Publisher: Mattel Interactive
- Director: Rodney White
- Producer: Ellen Hobbs
- Designers: Game Boy Color: Josh Mandel; PC: Scott Hazle; Troy Whitlock; Maria Vidal
- Programmers: Game Boy Color: Dominic Collins; Brian Beuken; Paul Windett; Wayne Mike; Danielle Beuken; PC: Jesse Spears; Jamie McBride Steans
- Artist: Gabriel Valles
- Writer: Rodney Gibbs
- Composer: Andrea Perry
- Platforms: Microsoft Windows; Game Boy Color
- Release: August 7, 2000 (PC); November 2000 (GBC)
- Genre: Action
- Mode: Single-player

The Wild Thornberrys: Rambler is an action adventure game based on Nickelodeon's The Wild Thornberrys animated television series, published by Mattel Interactive. It was released for Microsoft Windows in August 2000 and Game Boy Color in November 2000.

== Gameplay ==
The Microsoft Windows version contains five mouse and keyboard controlled mini-games themed to different countries and characters from the show, including: Eliza's Ice Hopper, Darwin's Another Vine Mess, Donnie's Bug Quest, Debbie's Monkey Chaser, and Nigel's Boomerang Tango.

The Game Boy Color version consists of six side-scrolling platformer and mini-game levels, also based on different locations and characters from the television series. This version offers three levels of difficulty with unique endings for each, password-based game saves, and a multiplayer board game mode via the Game Link Cable accessory.

== Development ==
The Wild Thornberrys: Rambler was developed for Microsoft Windows using Open Media Toolkit from Pacific Media Worx. Audio was created from samples from the Supreme Beats library by Spectrasonics. The television series cast reprise their roles for the game. Charlie Adler served as voiceover director for the game.

== Reception ==
The game received mixed to negative reviews. IGN gave the Game Boy Color version a 4.0 out of 10 rating, calling it "uninspired and simplistic" and criticizing its "wonky control, occasional bad collision detection, and aimless level structure." Nintendo Power gave this version a 2 out of 5, calling it "disappointingly tame and actionless."

The Microsoft Windows version received a 7.9 out of 10 from ReviewCorner.com, which wrote, "long-term replay value is a bit questionable," but that "this program is good, clean fun." PCMag called it "an uneven collection of games" and rated it 3 points out of 5.
