= Sea-Doo Hydrocross =

2001 video game

- Cover art
- Developers: Vicarious Visions; Engine Software
- Publisher: Vatical Entertainment
- Director: Bill Armintrout
- Designer: Mitch Booker
- Platform: PlayStation
- Release: NA: June 6, 2001
- Genre: Racing
- Modes: Single-player, multiplayer

Sea-Doo Hydrocross is a driving game developed by Vicarious Visions and published by Vatical Entertainment. It was released on June 6, 2001 on the PlayStation after many delays, though the planned Nintendo 64, Dreamcast and Game Boy Color releases never came to fruition. Project lead was Bill Armintrout and game designer was Mitch Booker.

== Development ==
At E3 2000, Vicarious Visions showed off two of their upcoming games: Polaris SnoCross and Sea-Doo Hydrocross. The former was said to be 80% complete at the time, with Sea-Doo HydroCross also nearing completion. Both were meant to be published by Vatical Entertainment later that year. The August 2000 issue of Nintendo Power (#135) said that both Cross games would see release in Fall 2000, which was later confirmed as that September. The September issue of Nintendo Power (#136) revealed that both games had been delayed, and said Sea-Doo Hydrocross would hit store shelves on November 21, a deadline that was missed as well. In February 2001 IGN had another interview with Vatical and confirmed that Sea-Doo Hydrocross was being tested by Nintendo, and had been delayed till Spring, a deadline that was also missed. This version was never released according to Micro64.

Micro64 explained:

Reasons as to why the game never got released are difficult to come up with. It definitely was not due to the game being unfinished. This game was complete enough to be reviewed by Nintendo Power, to be rated by the ESRB and have its own box art and UPC, and was in the process of being approved by Nintendo as of February 2001. The possibility of Nintendo not liking what they saw when approving it also seems incredibly unlikely. Although the Nintendo 64 version never saw the light of day, the PS1 version of Sea-Doo Hydrocross did get released in the Summer of 2001. This was at a time when the PS1 was old news and lots of Sony gamers had already moved onto the PS2. Strangely, this PS1 version was the last game published by Vatical as they seem to have disappeared shortly after ... To my knowledge, a Nintendo 64 prototype copy of Sea-Doo Hydrocross has not been found. That's a shame because if there's one out there, it's more than likely a 100% finished version.

== Gameplay ==
The game has five unique jet ski models, eight courses, a detailed Simulation mode, a fast-and-furious arcade mode, and is based on the engine used in the video game Polaris SnoCross. It can be played with 1–2 players.

Although the skis look different, the only playable Sea-Doo PWC was the XP.

== Critical reception ==
The PlayStation Museum gave the game a rating of 3.5 stars. A preview of the game by Nintendo Power in September 2000 noted that "the development team still has a lot of work to do if Sea-Doo is to compare favourably with Wave Race 64". Nintendo Power reviewed the game in its 139th issue, giving it an overall score of 5.6. It criticized the angular waves, lazily illustrated effects and glitchy backgrounds. It noted that "the handling is very tight", but that the game's "arcade aspirations are bogged down by tame courses and even tamer CPU rivals".
