= Mixed Messages (video game) =

2009 video game

- Developer: Vicarious Visions
- Publisher: Activision
- Platform: Nintendo DSi (DSiWare)
- Release: NA: April 13, 2009; PAL: April 17, 2009
- Genre: Party game
- Mode: Multiplayer only (2-21)

Mixed Messages is a hotseat turn-based multiplayer-only party game developed by Vicarious Visions and published by Activision. It was released via the DSiWare digital distribution service for the Nintendo DSi console.

== Gameplay ==
Gameplay screenshot

The first player writes down a funny sentence or phrase. Or alternatively, the game can generate a random sentence. The DSi then saves this entry (the game saves between each turn), and the DSi is handed over to someone else. Players can also enter their name into the system to make tracking of the process easier.

The second player then attempts to draw a scene describing the phrase or sentence. Again, this is saved and the DSi passed onto another player, who must write down what they think the original phrase was. The DSi is then passed on again for someone else to draw a picture, and this alternating words and pictures method continues until there are no more players.

Mixed Messages can be played by 2 to 21 players.

== Development ==
Mixed Messages was in development at Vicarious Visions for a number of years before the design coalesced.

"What started out as a little tinkering and game design idea quickly turned into a huge time sink, as people started playing it all the time," said CEO Karthik Bala in an interview with IGN.
