= Jet Grind Radio (2003 video game) =

2003 video game

- Developers: Vicarious Visions; Smilebit
- Publishers: NA: THQ; EU: Sega
- Director: Craig Derrick
- Designer: Robert Gallerani
- Programmers: Eric Caraszi; Jan-Erik Steel
- Artists: Robert Gallerani; Brent Gibson
- Composers: Hideki Naganuma; Richard Jacques
- Platform: Game Boy Advance
- Release: NA: June 26, 2003; EU: February 20, 2004
- Genres: Action, platform
- Modes: Single-player, multiplayer

Jet Grind Radio (released as Jet Set Radio in Europe) is a 2003 video game developed by Vicarious Visions and published by THQ for the Game Boy Advance. It is a handheld adaptation of the 2000 Dreamcast title Jet Set Radio. The game was released in North America on June 26, 2003, and in Europe on February 20, 2004.

== Gameplay ==
Jet Grind Radio is an action platform game based on the Dreamcast game, with gameplay that differs in several key areas from its home console counterpart. Instead of being a 3D game using polygons, it is a 2D game that utilizes an isometric viewpoint. The goal of the game is to traverse through neighborhoods and find key locations to tag them with graffiti under a specific time frame. Players can grind on rails and perform tricks. When a key location is reached, players must tag it with graffiti that may require a single press of a button, or a sequence of buttons that need to be pressed at the correct time. The game offers a graffiti editor to customize and create unique graffiti tags. Players can collect hidden icons scattered throughout in order to expand the number of graffiti tags. After completing the story mode of a specific neighborhood, three new time attack modes are unlocked for that neighborhood. The three modes involve tagging an entire city, racing, and performing tricks. Jet Grind Radio also offers 4-player multiplayer that allows players to compete within the unlocked time attack modes.

== Plot ==
The player assumes the role of one of the GG's, a graffiti gang, led by Beat. The business conglomerate, the Rokkaku Group, and the Tokyo-to government have teamed up to clamp down on the "Rudies", the game's term for the graffiti spraying youths. The object of the game is to "tag" certain surroundings with graffiti before the time limit runs out or "before the indomitable array of cops arrive".

== Development ==
Jet Grind Radio was developed by Vicarious Visions, who previously developed GBA ports of games in the Tony Hawk's series, and was published by THQ. The game utilizes the same engine and isometric perspective as the Tony Hawk's GBA titles. Due to hardware limitations, cartoony graphics were designed to emulate the look of the Dreamcast's cel-shaded graphics. The soundtrack, produced by Shin'en, was reduced from more than 21 music tracks on the Dreamcast to around 8 on the GBA, and the songs that remained were reduced to 30 to 45-second samples which looped repeatedly. The levels ranged from exact duplicates to reminiscent counterparts of the original Jet Set Radio.

== Reception ==
Jet Grind Radio

Aggregate score
Aggregator	Score
Metacritic	74/100

Review scores
Publication	Score
AllGame	3/5
Edge	4/10
Game Informer	7/10
GamePro	4/5
GameSpot	7.6/10
GameSpy	71/100
GameZone	8.5/10
IGN	8.5/10
X-Play	3/5

Jet Grind Radio received positive reviews, earning an aggregated score of 74 out of 100 on the review aggregator Metacritic. The game was featured by IGN as a runner up for their "Game of the Month" of June 2003, and was also the runner up for "Best Extreme Sports" category in IGN's 2003 Awards.

The game was praised for its presentation and accuracy to the original Dreamcast version. GameSpot praised the game for matching the quality of the console version, stating that "Jet Grind Radio is just as enjoyable on the GBA as it was on meatier consoles". GamePro complimented the visual style, stating the environments were beautifully detailed and ripped straight from the original. IGN gave a more lukewarm response, but still praised the game and developers for attempting to stay as faithful to the original. GameZone gave a similar response, stating that the game doesn't deserve as much praise as the original game, but still thought it was unique enough to stand out against other Game Boy Advance titles. Edge magazine, in contrast, was more critical and opined that the game should have sacrificed more authenticity in favor of playability. Game Informer praised it for staying true to the game design and retaining the gameplay and levels of its predecessors. Game Informer also had criticisms regarding the control-scheme of maneuvering the character in the isometric perspective, concluding: "All told, this GBA edition is done well enough that fans of the series will be satisfied with the on-the-go experience, but don't expect to be blown away".
