= Spy Muppets: License to Croak =

2003 The Muppets action video game

- North American cover art for Game Boy Advance, showing Kermit the Frog in a James Bond-themed suit
- Developer: Vicarious Visions
- Publisher: TDK Mediactive
- Series: The Muppets
- Platforms: Microsoft Windows, Game Boy Advance
- Release: November 18, 2003
- Genre: Action
- Mode: Single-player video game

Spy Muppets: License to Croak is a 2003 action game, based on The Muppets franchise, developed by Vicarious Visions and published by TDK Mediactive for Microsoft Windows and Game Boy Advance. It is a spoof of the James Bond films, the title being a reference to Licence to Kill. The player controls Kermit the Frog through several stages in order to stop the bad guys.

The game was released to mostly mixed reviews, with criticism generally aimed at the game's short length.

== Plot ==
Kermit the Frog works as Agent Frog (who is based on James Bond) for Agent Patriot (who is based on M and played by Sam Eagle) of the spy organization M.U.P.P.E.T. At the start of the game, Agent Patriot debriefs Agent Frog on the suspicious activities undertaken by three villains who must be stopped in their plans.

Agent Frog is then given the opportunity to pursue each of the three villains in succession in whatever order he wishes - King Prawn (played by Pepe the King Prawn), leader of S.H.E.L.L. (Secret Hidden Evil League of Lobsters); Piggy Galore (a parody of Pussy Galore played by Miss Piggy), a former top agent with M.U.P.P.E.T. whose warehouse hideout as a rogue has been uncovered; and Dr. Nose (a parody of Dr. Julius No played by Gonzo), who plans to turn the planet Earth into a giant egg from his frozen wasteland lair.

Each mission consists of four levels - a mechanical tool-selecting construction level in which Agent Frog puts together his mode of transportation (respectively a boat, convertible car and snowmobile), followed by two levels traveling to - and avoiding/defeating - the villain's henchmen (ex. mechanical lobster claws, pigs, chickens). The final mission is a boss fight against one of King Prawn, Piggy Galore or Dr. Nose head-to-head. If at any point Agent Frog runs out of health, he must be saved by Agent Rat, Agent Argh or Agent FFF (respectively played by Rizzo the Rat, Animal and Fozzie Bear) depending on the mission (ex. Agent Argh must break down a steel door to free Agent Frog; Agent FFF must knock out the Swedish Chef in order to save him from being cooked).

After defeating a villain, Agent Frog brings one of the villain's gadgets to agents B and B (played by Bunsen Honeydew and Beaker respectively) upon completion. Once all three villains have been defeated, B and B reveal themselves to be Statler and Waldorf, who wreak havoc using a machine made from the three gadget after kidnapping Piggy Galore; Agent Frog defeats Statler and Waldorf and hands them over to Agent Patriot.

Piggy Galore is revealed to have not only survived the kidnapping but has lost all memory of having gone bad; she and Agent Frog take a cruise on the spy boat toward the sunset as the credits roll.

== Reception ==
The game received mixed to positive reviews upon release, with critics generally praising the game's variety of levels although significant criticism was lobbed at the game's short length.
