= Oceanhorn 2: Knights of the Lost Realm =

2019 video game

- Developers: Cornfox & Bros.
- Publishers: Cornfox & Bros. (iOS, MacOS, Switch); FDG Entertainment (PS5, Xbox, PC)
- Engine: Unreal Engine 4
- Platforms: iOS; MacOS; Nintendo Switch; PlayStation 5 Xbox Series X/S; Microsoft Windows
- Release: iOS, MacOS (Apple Arcade); September 19, 2019; Nintendo Switch; October 28, 2020; PS5, Xbox Series X/S, Windows; August 2, 2023
- Genres: Action-adventure, action role-playing
- Mode: Single-player

Oceanhorn 2: Knights of the Lost Realm is an open-world action-adventure video game developed by Finnish studio Cornfox & Bros. It was released on iOS and MacOS as an Apple Arcade exclusive on September 19, 2019. It is the prequel of the 2013 game Oceanhorn: Monster of Uncharted Seas and takes place a millennium before the events of the game. A port for Nintendo Switch of Oceanhorn 2 was released on October 28, 2020. A version for next-gen consoles and PC was announced, to be published in partnership with FDG Entertainment.

The gameplay and graphic design of Oceanhorn 2 closely follows that of The Legend of Zelda video games, with the gameplay taking after the long line of linear games from the history of the saga and the art style bearing a close resemblance to Breath of the Wild. A follow-up, titled Oceanhorn: Chronos Dungeon, was released in January 2021.A sequel, Oceanhorn 3: Legend of the Shadow Sea, released on 5 March 2026.

== Story ==
Mesmeroth gives Master Mayfair a child in request of good care. Years later in his adulthood, Hero successfully passes his mission to be a knight. Returning home, he meets Trin and protects her from the Dark Troopers during an invasion; the pair, alongside Gen, escapes to White City, learning that Mesmeroth is planning to invade Arcadia. To prevent this, the Arcadians knights begin their journey to collect the three Sacred Emblems of Sun, Earth, and Ocean to the beacons, including the homes of Owrus and Gillfolks. Their mission is successful, but Mesmeroth and the Dark Troopers attack Submeria. To defend herself, Trin summons the Oceanhorn, one of the three powerful living fortresses, which Archimedes invented.

Upon being revealed his origin as Mesmeroth's creation to contain Sir Corbin's soul, Gen joins Mesmeroth after Sir Corbin departed, and before leaving, Mesmeroth informs the knights to find the crypt in Faroah. At the White City, Archimedes instructs them to return the Emblem of Sun to the Source to complete his plan to save Arcadia. Unfortunately the knights were all captured when they got ambushed by Mesmeroth and his Dark Troopers. during the imprisonment and escape in the Riskbourne Citadel, Hero retrieves the emblem after confronting Mesmeroth, who escapes once more, where he discovers a great power named Triloth from The Shadow. The party headed off to the White City to defeat Triloth, but when they are here, they are overwhelmed and sent into Tranquility, where The Great Chronicler offers them a second chance and send them back to Gaia. Meanwhile, Mesmeroth confronts Archimedes in the Grand Core and informs him that knights had failed to return the Emblem of Sun and told him step down. But Archimedes refuses and activates the main control while Mesmeroth's soul morphs into an Anima Orb by using his magic. As the Knights return to back to Gaia, they witness Triloth causing The Catastrophe while Oceanhorn becomes corrupted and uncontrollable. Forcing knights to defeats it at the White City Ruins, allowing them to escape.

Hero and Trin reunite with Mayfair. The world becomes protected by the Emblems of the Earth and Ocean, with the Emblem of Sun nowhere to be found. Years later, Mayfair witnesses Oceanhorn wandering into the deep waters while holding a child, which possibly is Hero's and Trin's.

== Reception ==
Reception

Aggregate score
Aggregator	Score
Metacritic	iOS: 69/100; NS: 71/100

Oceanhorn 2 received mixed or average reviews. It has been described shortly after launch as one of Apple Arcade's "killer exclusives".
