= Blizzard Albany =

American video game developer

- Formerly: Vicarious Visions, Inc. (1991–2022)
- Type: Subsidiary
- Industry: Video games
- Founded: 1991; 35 years ago
- Founders: Karthik Bala; Guha Bala
- Headquarters: Albany, New York, U.S.
- Key people: Simon Ebejer (studio head); Aaron Ondek (CTO)
- Number of employees: 200+ (2021)
- Parent: Activision (2005–2021); Blizzard Entertainment (2021–present)
- Website: vvisions.com at the Wayback Machine (archived March 20, 2022) (now redirects to blizzard.com)

Blizzard Albany (formerly Vicarious Visions, Inc.) is an American video game development division of Blizzard Entertainment based in Albany, New York. Founded in 1991, the company was acquired by Activision in January 2005. In January 2021, Vicarious Visions became part of Activision's sister company Blizzard Entertainment and was merged into it in April 2022.

== History ==
Final Vicarious Visions logo used from 2017 until its rebrand in 2022

The studio was founded by brothers Karthik and Guha Bala in 1991 while they were in high school. In the late 1990s, Vicarious Visions appointed Michael Marvin, an Albany-based investor and entrepreneur, and founder and former CEO of MapInfo Corporation; and Charles S. Jones, investor, who sat on the boards of various software and industrial companies including Geac and PSDI, to its board of directors. Under their leadership, a sale of the company was negotiated to Activision, earning the original investors over 20x their initial investment. In 1999, Vicarious Visions partnered with Vatical Entertainment for a three-year strategic alliance, where Vatical published titles Vicarious Visions is developing, including Game Boy Color. In January 2005, Vicarious Visions was acquired by publisher Activision. In June 2007, Activision closed the Vicarious Visions' office in Mountain View, California. On April 5, 2016, the Bala brothers announced that they had left the company. The brothers then founded Velan Studios in November 2016.

On January 22, 2021, Vicarious Visions was moved by Activision Blizzard from a subsidiary of Activision to a subsidiary of Blizzard Entertainment. Going forward, more than 200 employees of Vicarious Visions will be employees of Blizzard. Vicarious had been working with Blizzard for about two years prior to this announcement, and specifically on the planned remaster of Diablo II, Diablo II: Resurrected, and Blizzard felt the move would be best as to have Vicarious' group provide continued support not only on the remaster but also on other Diablo properties including Diablo IV. Vicarious Visions studio head Jen Oneal moved to Blizzard's management and was succeeded by Simon Ebejer, previously the studio's chief operating officer. On October 27, 2021, Blizzard informed Vicarious Visions employees that the studio would change its name. The studio was fully merged into Blizzard on April 12, 2022, and was renamed Blizzard Albany, otherwise retaining its offices.

Blizzard Albany's quality assurance team, about 20 members in size, announced a unionization drive in July 2022 as Game Workers Alliance Albany. It follows Raven Software, another Activision Blizzard subsidiary, whose QA team voted to unionize earlier in the year.

== Game history ==
Terminus, an online multiplayer space trading and combat simulation game, won two Independent Games Festival Awards in 1999. They became known as a leading developer of handheld games breaking ground by the Tony Hawk's Pro Skater series, developing Game Boy Advance and Nintendo DS titles in the franchise's main series as well as one spin off. They developed the first three Crash Bandicoot GBA games. Vicarious Visions developed Spider-Man, Spider-Man 2: Enter Electro, Ultimate Spider-Man, Crash Nitro Kart, Star Wars Jedi Knight II: Jedi Outcast, Star Wars Jedi Knight: Jedi Academy, and Doom 3 for the Xbox. Vicarious Visions developed for the Guitar Hero series on the Nintendo DS and Wii platforms. For Guitar Hero: On Tour, Vicarious Visions created the "Guitar Grip" peripheral for the Nintendo DS, which emulates the guitar controller for the portable system.

It was revealed on June 10, 2011, that Vicarious Visions was working on the 3DS version of Skylanders: Spyro's Adventure, and would go on to have an important role in developing the Skylanders game series, creating the games Skylanders: Swap Force and Skylanders: SuperChargers. On December 8, 2016, Vicarious Visions announced that they were partnering with Bungie to work on the Destiny franchise.

== Game engine ==
Vicarious Visions Alchemy is the company's game engine. It was released in 2002. It was originally called Intrinsic Alchemy and developed by Intrinsic Graphics before being renamed after Vicarious Visions acquired Intrinsic Graphics in 2003.

== Games developed ==
Year	Game	Platform(s)	Notes
1996	Synnergist	MS-DOS	
1997	Dark Angael	Windows	
1999	Zebco Fishing	Game Boy Color	
1999	Vigilante 8	Game Boy Color	
2000	Polaris SnoCross	Game Boy Color, Nintendo 64, PlayStation, Windows	
2000	Terminus	Windows, MacOS, Linux	
2000	Spider-Man	Game Boy Color	
2000	The Wild Thornberrys: Rambler	Game Boy Color	
2000	Pro Darts	Game Boy Color	
2000	Barbie: Magic Genie Adventure	Game Boy Color	
2000	Jimmy White's Cue Ball	Game Boy Color	
2001	Wanadoo SnowCross	Game Boy Color, Windows	
2001	Rescue Heroes: Fire Frenzy	Game Boy Color	
2001	Blue's Clues: Blue's Alphabet Book	Game Boy Color	
2001	SpongeBob SquarePants: Legend of the Lost Spatula	Game Boy Color	
2001	Zoboomafoo: Playtime in Zobooland	Game Boy Color	
2001	Monsters, Inc.	Game Boy Color	
2001	Kelly Club: Clubhouse Fun	Game Boy Color	
2001	Sea-Doo Hydrocross	PlayStation	
2001	Spider-Man 2: Enter Electro	PlayStation	
2001	Tony Hawk's Pro Skater 2	Game Boy Advance	
2001	Power Rangers: Time Force	Game Boy Advance	
2001	Spider-Man: Mysterio's Menace	Game Boy Advance	
2002	Crash Bandicoot: The Huge Adventure	Game Boy Advance	
2002	Tony Hawk's Pro Skater 3	Game Boy Advance	
2002	Frogger Advance: The Great Quest	Game Boy Advance	
2002	SpongeBob SquarePants: Revenge of the Flying Dutchman	Game Boy Advance	
2002	The Powerpuff Girls: Him and Seek	Game Boy Advance	
2002	Tony Hawk's Pro Skater 4	Game Boy Advance, PlayStation	
2002	Star Wars Jedi Knight II: Jedi Outcast	GameCube, Xbox	
2002	Whiteout	Windows, PlayStation 2, Xbox	
2003	The Muppets: On With the Show!	Game Boy Advance, Windows	
2003	Crash Bandicoot 2: N-Tranced	Game Boy Advance	
2003	Bruce Lee: Return of the Legend	Game Boy Advance	
2003	X2: Wolverine's Revenge	Game Boy Advance	
2003	Finding Nemo	Game Boy Advance	
2003	Jet Grind Radio	Game Boy Advance	
2003	Disney's Extreme Skate Adventure	Game Boy Advance	
2003	Disney's The Lion King 1½	Game Boy Advance	
2003	Tony Hawk's Underground	Game Boy Advance	
2003	SpongeBob SquarePants: Battle for Bikini Bottom	Game Boy Advance	
2003	Disney's Brother Bear	Game Boy Advance	
2003	Crash Nitro Kart	PlayStation 2, Xbox, GameCube	
2003	Crash Nitro Kart	Game Boy Advance	
2003	Spy Muppets: License to Croak	Game Boy Advance, Windows	
2003	Star Wars Jedi Knight: Jedi Academy	Xbox	
2004	Rivet	Mobile phone	
2004	Spider-Man vs. Doc Ock	Mobile phone	
2004	Shrek 2	Game Boy Advance	
2004	Crash Bandicoot Purple and Spyro Orange	Game Boy Advance	
2004	Shark Tale	Game Boy Advance	
2004	Tony Hawk's Underground 2	Game Boy Advance	
2004	That's So Raven	Game Boy Advance	
2004	Shrek 2: Beg For Mercy!	Game Boy Advance	
2004	Codename: Kids Next Door – Operation: S.O.D.A.	Game Boy Advance	
2004	Spider-Man 2	Nintendo DS, PlayStation Portable	
2004	Crash Nitro Kart	N-Gage	
2005	Doom 3	Xbox	
2005	Madagascar: Operation Penguin	Game Boy Advance	
2005	Batman Begins	Game Boy Advance	
2005	X-Men Legends II: Rise of Apocalypse	PlayStation Portable	
2005	Madagascar	Game Boy Advance, Nintendo DS	
2005	Ultimate Spider-Man	Game Boy Advance, Nintendo DS	
2005	Tony Hawk's American Sk8land	Game Boy Advance, Nintendo DS	
2006	Over the Hedge	Game Boy Advance, Nintendo DS	
2006	Over the Hedge: Hammy Goes Nuts	Game Boy Advance	
2006	Tony Hawk's Downhill Jam	Nintendo DS	
2006	Marvel: Ultimate Alliance	PlayStation Portable, Wii	
2007	Spider-Man 3	Game Boy Advance, Nintendo DS, PlayStation 2, PlayStation Portable, Wii	
2007	Shrek the Third	Game Boy Advance, Nintendo DS	
2007	Guitar Hero III: Legends of Rock	Wii	
2007	Transformers: Decepticons	Nintendo DS	
2007	Transformers: Autobots	Nintendo DS	
2007	Tony Hawk's Proving Ground	Nintendo DS	
2007	Bee Movie Game	Nintendo DS	
2008	Kung Fu Panda	Nintendo DS	
2008	Guitar Hero: On Tour	Nintendo DS	
2008	007: Quantum of Solace	Nintendo DS	
2008	Guitar Hero On Tour: Decades	Nintendo DS	
2008	Guitar Hero: Aerosmith	Wii	
2008	Guitar Hero World Tour	Wii	
2009	Guitar Hero 5	Wii	
2009	Marvel: Ultimate Alliance 2	PlayStation 3, Xbox 360	
2009	Band Hero	Nintendo DS, Wii	
2009	Mixed Messages	DSiWare	
2009	Transformers: Revenge of the Fallen - Decepticons	Nintendo DS	
2009	Transformers: Revenge of the Fallen - Autobots	Nintendo DS	
2009	Guitar Hero On Tour: Modern Hits	Nintendo DS	
2010	Transformers War for Cybertron: Decepticons	Nintendo DS	
2010	Transformers War for Cybertron: Autobots	Nintendo DS	
2010	Guitar Hero	iOS	
2010	Guitar Hero: Warriors of Rock	Wii	
2011	Skylanders: Spyro's Adventure	Nintendo 3DS	
2012	Skylanders: Cloud Patrol	iOS, Android, Kindle Fire	
2012	Skylanders: Lost Islands	iOS, Android	
2012	Skylanders: Battlegrounds	iOS, Android	
2012	Skylanders: Giants	Wii U	
2013	Skylanders: Swap Force	PlayStation 3, PlayStation 4, Wii U, Xbox 360, Xbox One	
2014	Skylanders: Trap Team	iOS, Android, Kindle Fire	
2015	Skylanders: SuperChargers	PlayStation 3, PlayStation 4, Wii U, Xbox 360, Xbox One, iOS	
2016	Skylanders: Imaginators (Crash Edition)	PlayStation 3, PlayStation 4, Nintendo Switch	
2016	Call of Duty: Infinite Warfare	PlayStation 4, Xbox One, Windows	
2017	Destiny 2	Windows	As a support team for Bungie
2017	Crash Bandicoot N. Sane Trilogy	PlayStation 4, Xbox One, Nintendo Switch, Windows	
2020	Tony Hawk's Pro Skater 1 + 2	PlayStation 4, Xbox One, Windows, PlayStation 5, Xbox Series X/S, Nintendo Switch	
2020	Call of Duty: Black Ops Cold War	PlayStation 4, Xbox One, Windows, PlayStation 5, Xbox Series X/S	Assisted Raven Software
2021	Call of Duty: Warzone	PlayStation 4, Xbox One, Windows, PlayStation 5, Xbox Series X/S	Assisted Raven Software
2021	Diablo II: Resurrected	PlayStation 5, PlayStation 4, Xbox Series X/S, Xbox One, Nintendo Switch, Windows	Co-developed with Blizzard Team 3
2023	Diablo IV	PlayStation 5, PlayStation 4, Xbox Series X/S, Xbox One, Nintendo Switch, Windows	Co-developed with Blizzard Team 3
2024	Diablo IV: Vessel of Hatred	PlayStation 5, PlayStation 4, Xbox Series X/S, Xbox One, Nintendo Switch, Windows	Co-developed with Blizzard Team 3
2026	Diablo IV: Lord of Hatred	PlayStation 5, PlayStation 4, Xbox Series X/S, Xbox One, Nintendo Switch, Windows	Co-developed with Blizzard Team 3

== Cancelled games ==
Year	Game	Platform(s)
2000	AMF Xtreme Bowling	Game Boy Color
2000	VR Sports Powerboat Racing	Game Boy Color
2000	Carnivale	Game Boy Color
2001	Sea-Doo Hydrocross	Game Boy Color, Dreamcast, Nintendo 64
2003	Shaun Palmer's Pro Snowboarder 2	Game Boy Advance
2003	Static Shock	Game Boy Advance
2008	Call of Duty: Roman Wars	Microsoft Windows, PlayStation 3, Xbox 360
