= Oceanhorn: Monster of Uncharted Seas =

2013 video game

- Developers: Cornfox & Bros.
- Publisher: FDG Entertainment
- Designer: Heikki Repo
- Programmers: Jukka Viljamaa; Antti Viljamaa; Kalle Hämäläinen; Erik Hakala; Tim Wiren
- Artist: Heikki Repo
- Writer: Heikki Repo
- Composers: Kalle Ylitalo; Kenji Ito; Nobuo Uematsu
- Platforms: iOS, Microsoft Windows, tvOS, macOS, PlayStation 4, Xbox One, PlayStation Vita, Android, Nintendo Switch
- Release: November 14, 2013: iOS; WW: November 14, 2013 Microsoft Windows; WW: March 17, 2015 macOS; WW: May 19, 2016 PlayStation 4, Xbox One; WW: September 7, 2016 Android; WW: December 15, 2016 PlayStation Vita; WW: May 17, 2017 Nintendo Switch; WW: June 22, 2017
- Genre: Action-adventure
- Mode: Single-player

Oceanhorn: Monster of Uncharted Seas is an action-adventure video game developed by Finnish studio Cornfox & Bros. It focuses on an unnamed boy protagonist's quest to find his lost father and defeat the living fortress, Oceanhorn. It was first released for iOS in November 2013, and later had ports for Android, Microsoft Windows, macOS, PlayStation 4, Xbox One, Nintendo Switch and PlayStation Vita.

The gameplay and graphic design of Oceanhorn closely follows that of The Legend of Zelda video games, notably The Wind Waker and A Link to the Past. Players explore dungeons, fight monsters with various weapons, and throw pots and cut bushes to find hidden coins or hearts. The music of Oceanhorn was composed by Kalle Ylitalo, with a few additional compositions by Kenji Ito and Nobuo Uematsu. A prequel, titled Oceanhorn 2: Knights of the Lost Realm, was released in September 2019.

== Reception ==
Reception

Aggregate score
| Aggregator | Score |
|---|---|
| Metacritic | iOS: 85/100; PC: 74/100; PS4: 66/100; XONE: 71/100; NS: 66/100 |

Review score
| Publication | Score |
|---|---|
| TouchArcade | 5/5 |

The game has a rating of 85 out of 100 on Metacritic for the iOS version of the game, based on 19 critic reviews; however, the console versions scored substantially lower, with the PS4 and Xbox One versions scoring 66 and 71 on the site, respectively, based on 22 aggregated reviews.

That said, critical reactions to the game appear to be positive, with most of the praise going to visuals and music but criticism aimed towards the puzzles and the storylines. CNET commented on the iOS version of the game, saying that "if The Legend of Zelda were to come to mobile ... we don't think it could do a better job [than Oceanhorn]", and TouchArcade, also speaking on the iOS version of the game, praised the "excellent music, occasional voice-acting, and vibrant, lush 3D graphics," while concluding that the game was "a near-perfect, rendition of Zelda" for mobiles.

=== Sales ===
By October 2016, the game had sold over one million copies across all platforms.
