= Skylanders: Giants =

2012 video game

- Developers: Toys for Bob; Vicarious Visions (Wii U) n-Space (3DS)
- Publisher: Activision
- Designer: Vince Castillo
- Artist: Terry Falls
- Writer: Alex Ness
- Composers: Hans Zimmer (main theme); Lorne Balfe
- Series: Skylanders
- Engine: Vicarious Visions Alchemy
- Platforms: Nintendo 3DS; PlayStation 3 Wii; Wii U Xbox 360
- Release: Nintendo 3DS, PlayStation 3, Wii, Xbox 360: AU: October 17, 2012; EU: October 19, 2012; NA: October 21, 2012; BR: November 22, 2012; Wii U: NA: November 18, 2012; EU/AU: November 30, 2012
- Genres: Toys-to-life, action role-playing
- Modes: Single-player, multiplayer

Skylanders: Giants is a 2012 toys-to-life action role-playing game in the Skylanders series and a direct sequel to the 2011 game Skylanders: Spyro's Adventure. As the title suggests, it features larger Skylanders known as "Giants", along with other new gameplay mechanics. 16 new Skylanders were introduced, including 8 "Giants": Bouncer, Crusher, Eye-Brawl, Hot Head, Ninjini, Swarm, Thumpback, and Tree Rex.

It was released in October 2012 for Nintendo 3DS, PlayStation 3, Wii, and Xbox 360, and was also released on the Wii U as a launch title in North America, Europe and Australia.

== Gameplay ==
Skylanders: Giants builds upon the fundamentals of the first game, which merges a line of physical toy figures with a video game world. The game introduced over 40 new toy figures, some of which are more than twice the size of the original Skylanders cast in both physical and virtual form. The game involves connecting a physical toy to the video game console through a "Portal of Power"; whichever toy is used creates a respective character in the game. Toy figures from the first game are also forward compatible with Giants, although there are also new versions, called "Series 2", which have more powerful attributes than the originals. If the Series 2 Skylanders are used in the first game, they act as their own Series 1 counterparts. A new series of figurines called "LightCore" was also introduced, which glow when put on the Portal of Power and have a flash bomb attack in-game. The game has a new and improved "Battle Mode" for head-to-head play, featuring more areas and gameplay options as well as offering a new variety of alter ego Skylanders.

== Plot ==
10,000 years ago, the Arkeyan Empire, which consisted of robots, enslaved Skylands. The Giants, the first Skylanders who are larger than the normal Skylanders, rebelled and defeated the robot king who held the source of Arkeyan power, the Iron Fist of Arkus. The victory powered down every robot, but the Giants were suddenly transported to Earth by the Fist, where they froze into toys due to lack of magic. Over time, they came to be regarded as myths because of their unexplained disappearance.

In the present day, following the events of the first Skylanders game, Kaos, who was shrunk and put on display in a toy store on Earth, returns to the Skylands after finding a Portal of Power.

The Skylanders embark on Captain Flynn's ship, the Dread-Yacht, after learning something big is happening in Skylands. They meet Ermit the hermit, who reveals that Kaos has returned and accidentally awakened an ancient Arkeyan Conquertron, a giant robot, which has recruited him as its new leader. They are searching for the Lost City of Arkus where the Iron Fist is. The Skylanders race Kaos to the Lost City, also Ermit tells the crew he has a giant robot of his own. The Skylanders encounter a "machine ghost" which turns out to be the soul of Ermit's robot, before reactivating it.

Despite the Skylanders' efforts, Kaos manages to reach the Iron Fist of Arkus first and transforms into a large Arkeyan robot, preparing for his conquest over the Skylands with alongside the reactivated Arkeyans. The Skylanders discover that he cannot be stopped unless the Iron Fist is removed from him. With help from Ermit and the Machine Ghost, the Skylanders remove the Fist of Arkus, defeating Kaos and returning him to normal. The Arkeyan Conquertron carries Glumshanks and Kaos out of the collapsing city before shutting down completely.

Post-credits, Kaos and Glumshanks are shown entering Kaos' Kastle, where they encounter Kaos's mother, who is only shown in shadow. If players complete Nightmare Mode, they are given a scene where Chompies dance and party around the deactivated Iron Fist of Arkus.

== 3DS Plot ==
10,000 years ago, the dreaded pirate Captain Freightbeard terrorized the Skylands before he was imprisoned in the Chest of Exile, with his sword used as a lock. Eventually, he returns to find the chest and wreak havoc once more. The Skylanders and the Giants, along with Hugo, Flynn and Cali, must find the Chest by following the clues before Freightbeard does.

== Starter Packs ==
=== Console Starter Pack ===
These Starter Pack accessories are:

- Skylanders Giants disc
- Poster of all the Skylanders from Skylanders Giants
- Portal of Power
- Trading cards (3)
- Stickers and codes (3)
- 3 Skylanders figures: Tree Rex (Giant - Life), Cynder (Series 2 - Undead), and Jet-Vac (Air)

=== 3DS Starter Pack ===
The 3DS Starter Pack contains the portal, 3DS game card, and a Punch Pop Fizz figure instead of Jet-Vac.

== Development ==
It was shown at E3 2012.

== Reception ==
Reception

Aggregate score
Aggregator	Score
Metacritic	X360: 80/100; PS3: 77/100; WII: 78/100; WIIU: 80/100; 3DS: 59/100

Review scores
Publication	Score
Destructoid	X360: 8/10
Eurogamer	8/10
Game Informer	X360: 8/10
GameRevolution	X360: 8/10; 3DS: 5/10
GamesRadar+	WII: 3.5/5; WIIU: 3.5/5
IGN	8/10
Joystiq	PS3: 3.5/5
Nintendo Life	WII: 8/10; WIIU: 8/10
Nintendo Power	WII: 8/10; 3DS: 7/10
Nintendo World Report	WII: 9.5/10; WIIU: 9/10
Official Nintendo Magazine	WII: 63/100
Pocket Gamer	3DS: 2.5/5
Polygon	X360: 8/10
Push Square	PS3: 6/10
VentureBeat	X360: 85/100
VideoGamer.com	X360: 8/10

Skylanders: Giants received "generally favorable" reviews for most platforms according to review aggregator website Metacritic; the Nintendo 3DS version received "mixed or average" reviews. However, the reviews in general were slightly lower than that of the previous game, especially for the Nintendo 3DS version, which received the lowest Metacritic score in the series.

IGN gave the game an 8 out of 10 score, calling it a "...a more polished but by-the-numbers sequel that's really fun to play". PlayStation Lifestyle, however, gave the game a lower score with a 70/100, saying, "The reality is that Skylanders: Giants is age-appropriate fun that harkens back to the delight you had collecting Pokémon cards or mashing your way through a dungeon crawler. If you've got little ones, then you already know the verdict here."

During the 16th Annual D.I.C.E. Awards, the Academy of Interactive Arts & Sciences awarded Skylanders: Giants with "Family Game of the Year".

=== Sales ===
Skylanders: Giants generated over $195 million in U.S. sales in 2012. In the first two weeks of sales, 500,000 Starter Packs and Portal Owner Packs were sold in the U.S. and Europe. A few months after its release, Activision reported that they had generated a billion dollars in sales for the franchise overall, just 15 months after the first game.
