= Polaris SnoCross =

2000 video game

- North American Nintendo 64 cover art
- Developer: Vicarious Visions
- Publisher: Vatical Entertainment
- Designer: Bryan Shutt
- Programmers: David Brickhill; Quentin; Froemke
- Artists: Brian Keffer; Carl Scheel; Steve Derrick
- Platforms: Game Boy Color, PlayStation, Nintendo 64, Microsoft Windows
- Release: Game Boy Color: NA: February 2000; EU: November 16, 2001; PlayStation: NA: August 29, 2000; Nintendo 64: NA: December 27, 2000; Windows: EU: November 15, 2001; NA: December 19, 2001
- Genre: Racing
- Modes: Single-player, multiplayer

Polaris SnoCross is a snocross snowmobile racing game for Game Boy Color, PlayStation, Nintendo 64, and later Microsoft Windows. It was released in 2000. French publisher Wanadoo Edition released a budget version of the game for the PC in 2001, called SnowCross.

== Reception ==
Reception

Aggregate scores
Aggregator	Score		
Aggregator	GBC	N64	PS
GameRankings	66%	50%	58%
Metacritic	N/A	N/A	57/100

Review scores
Publication	Score		
Publication	GBC	N64	PS
AllGame	3.5/5	N/A	2.5/5
Electronic Gaming Monthly	N/A	4/10	2.5/10
Game Informer	N/A	N/A	5.5/10
GameSpot	7.8/10	3.8/10	5/10
IGN	7/10	4.3/10	4.8/10
N64 Magazine	N/A	57%	N/A
Nintendo Power	6.7/10	6.1/10	N/A
Official U.S. PlayStation Magazine	N/A	N/A	2.5/5
PlayStation: The Official Magazine	N/A	N/A	6/10

The PlayStation version received "mixed" reviews according to the review aggregation website Metacritic.
