= Synnergist =

1996 point-and-click adventure video game

- Developer: Vicarious Visions
- Publisher: 21st Century Entertainment
- Platform: MS-DOS
- Release: 1996
- Genre: Adventure
- Mode: Single-player

Synnergist is a point-and-click adventure video game developed by Vicarious Visions and published by 21st Century Entertainment for MS-DOS in 1996. It was Vicarious Visions' debut video game. The game includes "digitized actors (almost 70) and full motion video." It was only released in Europe.

== Plot ==
The game's plot centers around the player taking on the role of Tim Machin, a journalist in the fictional city of New Arhus in the year 2010. The city, once prosperous, has now fallen into widespread chaos and decay. As Tim investigates, he encounters twists, turns, and a mysterious humanitarian figure named Victor Ambrose.

== Development and release ==
The graphic backgrounds for Synnergist were produced by Pomono Productions. Music and sound were created by Daevid Vincent and Thomas O. Plinzke. The gamebox cover art was created by Dave McKean.

When the game was released, Vicarious Visions offered a prize to the first five people to discover hidden Easter eggs.

== Reception ==
Coming Soon magazine gave the game 81 out of 100, Tap-Repeatedly/Four Fat Chicks gave 4 Stars, PC Player (Denmark) gave 73 out of 100, PC Games (Germany) gave 68 out of 100, High Score gave 2 out of 5, Power Play gave 40 out of 100, and PC Player (Germany) gave 2 Stars. Csoon wrote "Synnergist maintains a good story line throughout the game, keeping the player's interest high in wanting to solve the mystery... Some of the puzzles can be a little difficult to figure out, and once you are stuck, the game can be slow." The site gave the game a rating of 81%. In another positive review, Four Fat Chicks wrote "Here is a game that has an interesting plot with many twists and turns, nice graphics, unobtrusive sound and music, easy interface, and a good number of varied locations to explore. Synnergist has a similar mood and style to Noctropolis, with a little Gabriel Knight–type understated tension thrown in... It's a shame that Vicarious Visions didn't follow up Synnergist with any other adventure games."

In a contemporary Hardcore Gaming 101 review, contributor Petra Tsimberov finds the game interesting for being a notable example of outsider art, drawing attention to how much of its development cycle was spent while Vicarious Visions founders Karthik and Guha Bala were still in high school. She noted "Wherever it fails, it's a shame, but almost to-be expected. But where it gets things right, it's all the more enthralling." The review went on to criticize the game's technical shortcomings but praised the game's ability to immerse and captivate the player through its painted backgrounds and atmosphere - "Objectively the whole game is really rather forgettable, but if you approach it with the same dream-oriented excitement the Bala brothers had back in 1991, it may just stick around for longer."
