= Ras (surname) =

Ras is a surname with a variety of origins. In Dutch ras means "nimble, swift", but it is a patronymic surname: the archaic given name Ras, Raas, or Raes was short for Erasmus or was a derivative the Middle Dutch male name Razo. In Polish or Serbian the name is likely also patronymic, while in French the meaning "bare" or "shorn" may indicate a topographic name for someone who lived on bare or razed land. People with this surname include:

- Barbara Ras (born 1949), American poet, translator and publisher
- Eva Ras (born 1941), Serbian actress, writer, and painter
- Hans Ras (1926–2003), Dutch professor of Javanese language and literature
- Koos Ras (1928–2001), South African singer and comedian
- Leopold Willem Ras (1760s–1823), Dutch merchant-trader and diplomat, opperhoofd in Dejima
- Marthinus Nikolaas Ras (1853–1900), South African farmer, soldier, and gun-maker
- Maxime Ras (born 1988), French football striker
- Radomir Stević Ras (1931–1982), Serbian painter, illustrator and designer
- Tony Ras (born 1994), Dutch ice hockey player

== See also ==
- Ireneusz Raś (born 1972), Polish politician
- Jan Raas (born 1952), Dutch cyclist
- Raes, Belgian surname of the same origin
