= Raes =

Raes is a Dutch patronymic surname most common in East Flanders. The archaic given name Raes or Raas was short for Erasmus or was a derivative the Middle Dutch male name Razo. People with this surname include:

- Albert Raes (born 1932), Belgian magistrate and head of the Belgian Security Services
- Anouk Raes (born 1988), Belgian field hockey player
- Godfried-Willem Raes (born 1952), Belgian composer, performer and instrument maker
- Hugo Raes (1929–2013), Belgian novelist
- Maurice Raes (1907–1992), Belgian racing cyclist
- Roeland Raes (1934–2024), Belgian jurist and politician
- Tom Raes (born 1988), Belgian footballer

== See also ==
- Jan Raas (born 1952), Dutch cyclist
- Ras (surname), surname of the same origin
- Rae (disambiguation)
- RAeS, the British Royal Aeronautical Society
- 9797 Raes, asteroid named after Hugo Raes
- The Raes, Welsh-Canadian singing duo who had a television show of the same name
- Raes Junction, small settlement in New Zealand
