= Koos =

Koos may refer to:

- Koos (name), a masculine given name and a surname
- Koos (fashion label), a former haute couture fashion label
- Koos (island), in the Bay of Greifswald, Mecklenburg-Vorpommern, Germany
- Koos Group, a Taiwan-based pan-Asian business group
- KOOS, a radio station in North Bend, Oregon, United States
- KTEE, originally KOOS, a radio station in North Bend, Oregon
- Koos/Together, an Estonian political party
