= California Department of Fair Employment and Housing v. Activision Blizzard =

Settled anti-discrimination lawsuit

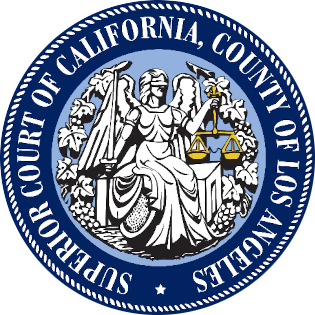
- Court: Los Angeles County Superior Court
- Full case name: California Department of Fair Employment and Housing v. Activision Blizzard

Outcome
- Settled for $54 million without any admission of wrongdoing

California Department of Fair Employment and Housing v. Activision Blizzard was a lawsuit filed by the California Civil Rights Department against video game developer Activision Blizzard in July 2021. The lawsuit asserted that management of Activision Blizzard allowed and at times encouraged sexual misconduct towards female employees, that the company maintained a "frat boy" culture, and that the company's hiring and employment practices were discriminatory against women.

After Activision Blizzard dismissed the claims in the lawsuit as false, more than 2,600 of the company's 9,500 staff signed an open letter demanding the company take the allegations seriously and make changes. While Activision CEO Bobby Kotick later promised the company would internally review the allegations, employees were not satisfied by the response. Employees staged a walkout on July 28, 2021, virtually joined by other developers and players across the industry. DFEH's lawsuit triggered a separate class action lawsuit by Activision Blizzard's shareholders at the federal level, asserting that the company failed to meet its fiduciary duties under the Securities Exchange Act of 1934. A later investigative report by The Wall Street Journal published in November 2021 claimed that Kotick had known about the allegations of misconduct for years but failed to take action, leading employees to stage a second walkout, and the broader gaming industry called for Kotick to step down.

Activision Blizzard and the CRD settled the lawsuit in December 2023 for $54 million, mostly associated with pay inequalities, with no admission of widespread harassment within Activision Blizzard. Coupled with allegations of misconduct and discrimination at game developers Riot Games and Ubisoft, the DFEH lawsuit was seen by analysts, academics, and media outlets as bringing the #MeToo movement to the video game industry and raising the likelihood of widespread unionization.

== Background ==
=== Activision Blizzard ===
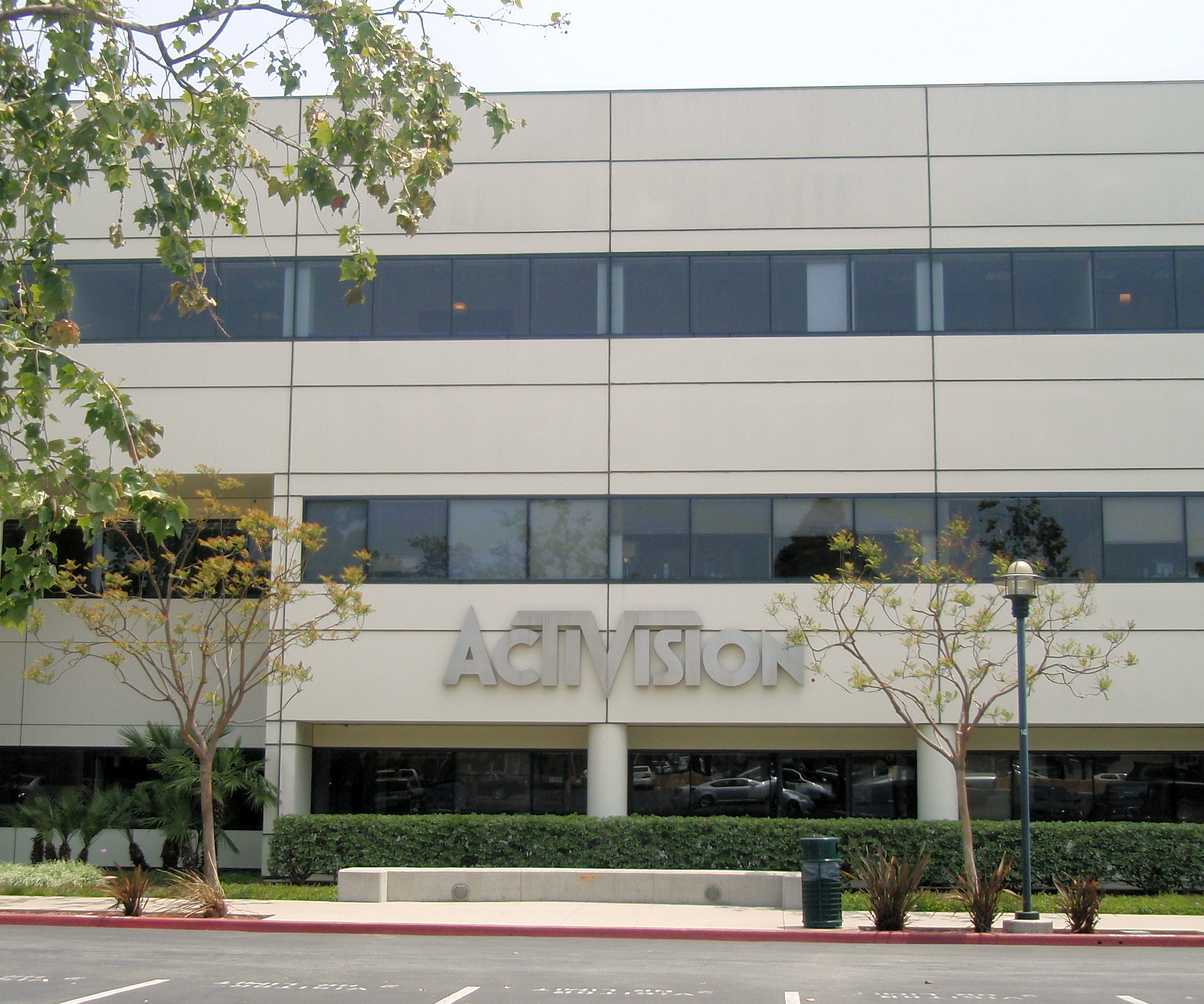
Activision's headquarters in Santa Monica, California

Activision Blizzard was formed in July 2008 as a merger of Activision Inc. and Vivendi Games, a subdivision of the French media conglomerate Vivendi, which owned Blizzard Entertainment. The merger was influenced by the rapid growth of Blizzard's flagship product, the subscription-based massively multiplayer online game (MMO) World of Warcraft. At the time, Activision had yet to create any MMO games. Once the merger was approved, Activision Inc. rebranded as Activision Blizzard. Activision Publishing was established to house Activision's existing studios, and Blizzard Entertainment remained a division within the larger company. Vivendi's share in Activision Blizzard was eventually fully acquired by Activision shareholders in 2014. In February 2016, the company substantially expanded with the acquisition of King, the mobile game developer and publisher behind Candy Crush Saga. King became Activision Blizzard's third major division. From 1991 until his departure in December 2023, Bobby Kotick served as CEO for Activision and Activision Blizzard. Activision Blizzard is the largest North American publisher of video games based on revenue, surpassing Electronic Arts and Take-Two Interactive, and reported over $8 billion in revenues for their 2020 fiscal year.

The Activision Blizzard logo

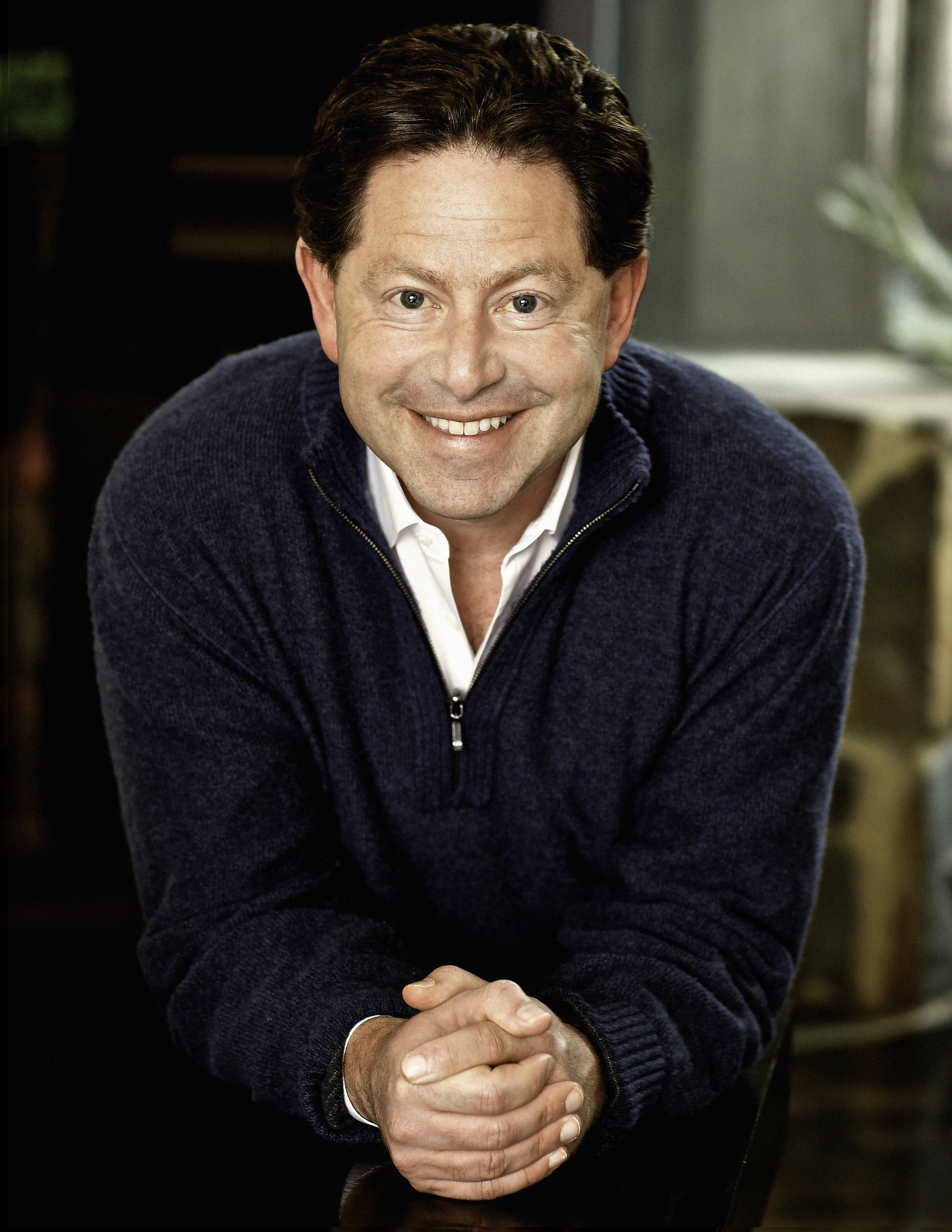
Former CEO, Bobby Kotick

Since around 2018, Blizzard Entertainment underwent corporate changes, such as the departure of Blizzard's co-founder Mike Morhaime, and a heavier focus on mobile gaming at the cost of Blizzard's more traditional PC gaming background. PC Gamer considered that some of these changes may be a result of the parent Activision's influence on managing Blizzard towards a more profitable business. Jason Schreier of Bloomberg News reported on Activision's influence on the poor quality of Warcraft 3: Reforged, a remake of Warcraft III, in 2020. Activision did not see much value in remasters at the time of its development in 2017, and instead pressured Blizzard to focus on newer games, according to Schreier. This led to the development budget for Warcraft 3: Reforged to be cut significantly, impacting the game's quality, and the Classic Games team within Blizzard to be disbanded after the game was released.

=== Discrimination and sexual misconduct in the video game industry ===
Gender demographics in the video game industry have skewed towards men, particularly in contrast with the demographics of video game players. While companies have worked to improve diversity in hiring, the International Game Developers Association estimated in 2017 that only about 20% of the video game development workforce are women, while the Entertainment Software Association estimated that same year that 41% of gamers were women. As of 2021, Activision Blizzard's workforce is 80% male and following the departure of Jen Oneal the company's top level leadership is exclusively male. The gender gap arises from a feedback loop, in which women are less inclined to join the industry due to lack of apparent representation both within the industry and within video games, as well as typically accepted practices within the industry such as the use of "crunch time" and long working hours that typically disfavor female employees. This situation has led to ongoing concerns about the discrimination and treatment of women within the video game industry. The Gamergate controversy in 2014 raised awareness of mistreatment of women within the industry, alongside the larger #MeToo movement in other sectors.

While the video games industry had experienced other isolated cases of sexual misconduct by one individual towards others, reporters for The Guardian, Time, and The New York Times have observed that the industry had not yet felt the weight of the #MeToo movement that other industries had in 2021. Brianna Wu, one of several women in gaming who faced significant harassment as a result of the Gamergate harassment campaign, said that the video game industry has had visible incidents of sexual misconduct and misogyny towards female developers in which the persons at fault were fired. However, she argued that the impacts of these events had yet to reach the same level of change as the MeToo movement had brought to other media industries, stating that "our industry has done nothing but window-dressing in getting rid of the harassers".

== Lawsuit ==
As a result of a two-year investigation, on July 20, 2021, DFEH filed a lawsuit in Los Angeles Superior Court. The lawsuit alleges that Activision Blizzard has fostered a "frat boy" culture in which female employees endure regular sexual harassment and experience discrimination and retaliation. DFEH sought an injunction to require Activision Blizzard to comply with state workforce protections, and to recover damages for female employees that would include unpaid wages, pay adjustments, back pay, and lost wages and benefits.

The lawsuit contends that Activision Blizzard and its workforce, which is 80% male, contribute to a hostile atmosphere towards female employees. The allegations mainly focus on reports of workplace misconduct at Blizzard Entertainment, though also asserts similar problems occurred within Activision and its studios. The complaint describes male employees playing video games during work hours while delegating their job to women employees, engaging in sexual banter and making advances towards female colleagues, and joking about rape. Prominent executives and creators at the company allegedly "engaged in blatant sexual harassment without repercussions". Within both Activision's and Blizzard's studios, management allegedly both allowed and encouraged "cube crawls", where male employees went from cubicle to cubicle, drinking heavily and making inappropriate advances towards and physically touching female employees. An employee's hotel room, rented during the company's annual BlizzCon event in 2013, was reportedly nicknamed the "Cosby suite" by other employees due to the man's reputation for harassing women. This was said to be in reference to the Bill Cosby sexual assault cases, though others claimed the name was chosen based on the room's rug pattern which resembled Cosby's sweaters.

A woman employee reportedly committed suicide during a business trip after suffering "intense sexual harassment" in the preceding days, which included employees sharing nude photos of her at a company holiday party. The human resources departments allegedly did not keep reports of sexual harassment confidential, which as a result allowed managers and others to retaliate against employees who reported misconduct, such as by denying them promotions, transferring them to other departments, prioritizing them during company-wide layoffs, or preventing them from working on desirable projects.

The lawsuit specifically named Alex Afrasiabi, the former creative director on World of Warcraft, as an individual at the center of several of these allegations, including an allegation in the amended lawsuit by former software engineer Cher Scarlett that she had been harassed by Afrasiabi at a work event, and that a friend told her she experienced something similar a year prior at BlizzCon. Activision Blizzard later reported that Afrasiabi had been fired for misconduct in mid-2020 after their own internal investigation found him and two others at fault for similar misconduct between 2018 and 2020. The lawsuit listed an unnamed Chief technology officer, whom Scarlett alleged in a series of tweets to be Ben Kilgore. The allegations were later corroborated by Bloomberg News and The Wall Street Journal. Kilgore, who had previously worked as a VP at Microsoft, was terminated in 2018 for misconduct. Three other employees, including one known to be involved in incidents related to the 2013 "Cosby suite", were no longer working for the company by August 11, 2021. One of these employees included Jesse McCree, who was the namesake of the Overwatch character McCree.

Other parts of the complaint were focused on the discriminatory treatment of female employees, particularly women of color, in hiring, pay, assignment, promotion, and firing and constructive dismissal. Women were reportedly universally paid less and offered less stock and incentive pay than their male colleagues, beginning when they were hired and continuing throughout their employment. The lawsuit also alleges they had to work much harder to be promoted, or were passed over entirely. Some women employees reported being denied promotions due to fears they might become pregnant, being reprimanded for needing to go pick up their children, and being kicked out of lactation rooms by male colleagues who wanted to meet in the room. Some factors alleged by the DFEH were in connection with poor reporting of workplace harassment, but the suit also contends that Activision Blizzard overall failed to properly consider diversity in hiring and promotion practices.

The suit was filed under California's Senate Bill 973, which authorizes DFEH to file lawsuits relating to violations of the state's Equal Pay Act, and which passed in October 2020 and went into effect on January 1, 2021. The bill, authored by California senator Hannah-Beth Jackson, was intended to bypass complexities that had arisen during the Trump administration over the reporting of wage information to the Equal Employment Opportunity Commission. Under the Equal Pay Act, companies of 100 employees or more are required to report pay data for specific job areas, segmented by gender, race, and ethnicity; this data is kept confidential to the state, but may be used to determine if there are pay discrepancies due to gender or race. DFEH asserted "Blizzard's double-digit percentage growth, ten-figure annual revenues, and recent diversity marketing campaigns have unfortunately changed little. Defendants' compliance with California's broad workplace protections is long overdue". According to Noah Smith of The Washington Post, DFEH normally does not pursue such cases, typically seeking to find settlements when it finds actionable issues. In the prior two years, DFEH only proceeded to take companies to court a few dozen times out of over tens of thousands of submitted complaints. The director of DFEH, Kevin Kish, stated that "Our investigations and litigation have to be strategically targeted at remedying violations that affect as many people as we can reach. Our priority has to be on systemic violation of civil rights law, given the scope of what we have to do. We were given tools by the state legislature and we should be using them." Dawn Knepper, an employment attorney, told The Washington Post that because the Equal Pay Act is relatively recent legislation, the DFEH's case against Activision Blizzard could set a major precedent for California's employment laws.

The DFEH's complaint was expanded on August 24, 2021, to include temporary and contract workers in addition to permanent employees, as California law also was intended to protect temporary work rights as well. The amended complaint also accused Activision Blizzard of interfering in DFEH's discovery for the case, claiming that their HR department had shredded key documents they had requested. Activision Blizzard stated in response that "we have complied with every proper request in support of its review even as we had been implementing reforms to ensure our workplaces are welcoming and safe for every employee." Los Angeles County Superior Court judge Timothy P. Dillon agreed to the amended complaint in February 2022, and set an expected trial start date in February 2023.

The CDFE, now the California Civil Rights Department (CRD), and Activision Blizzard announced they had settled the lawsuit on December 15, 2023, pending court approval. As part of the settlement, Activision Blizzard will set aside $54 million, with $47 million to deal with pay and promotion inequalities against female employees, and will bring in outside consultants to further review their pay and promotion processes. However, the settled stated that as part of the terms of the settlements, "no court or any independent investigation has substantiated any allegations" about "systemic or widespread sexual harassment at Activision Blizzard."

=== Collaborating investigations ===
According to Jason Schreier for Bloomberg News, the complaint's primary focus on misconduct in Blizzard Entertainment was due to the division treating its top developers and management as "rock stars", making them nearly untouchable by any complaint filed against them. Blizzard had gained a reputation as both a highly creative studio and a desirable place to work, according to Schreier. Some employees who spoke to Schreier stated that attitudes shifted in the company when World of Warcraft rapidly grew in popularity between 2003 and 2005, and this shift marked the onset of the problems named in the lawsuit. Top developers attending BlizzCon, the annual convention held by Blizzard with players, reportedly viewed women attendees not as players but as groupies, and came to expect sexual favors from them. Schreier stated that this attitude continued to persist within Activision Blizzard through the 2010s in part due to the approximately 20% female demographic and the studio's pressure on employees to make personal sacrifices of time and salary for working at the prestigious studio. As described by Vox's Aja Romano, this type of "rock star" attitude persists across major studios like Activision Blizzard and Ubisoft, and coerces newer hires to commit to long hours to show their dedication to the craft and the company or otherwise potentially be fired. The male-dominated culture, particularly from those who grew up playing video games, can potentially bring a culture of "casual misogyny" with them which could then easily translate into a hostile workplace for women, according to Romano.

The Washington Post's Shannon Liao also spoke to former employees, many of whom stated that Blizzard had a "drinking culture". The offices were well-stocked with alcohol, which led to the "cube crawls", and employees regularly became inebriated at company events like BlizzCon. This type of activity had been reined in by 2019, with alcohol in the offices severely reduced and employees limited to two drinks at public events.

Activision Blizzard employees speaking to Schreier said some complaints about the company's hostile environment went unreported because some senior management was known to disregard such incidents. Blizzard was also averse to reporting these problems to its parent Activision, which internally had been called the "Eye of Sauron", fearing retribution if the problems became known.

An investigative report by The Wall Street Journal published on November 16, 2021, stated that Kotick had been well aware of the misconduct at the company but had done little to stem it. The report describes one example of a former female employee of Activision's subsidiary Sledgehammer Games who said she had been raped by her male supervisor in 2016 and 2017 after she had been coerced to get drunk at work events. She had reported the incidents to management but nothing had been done, and instead the company reached a settlement with her after she had filed a lawsuit against them. Kotick had been aware of this and similar events, according to internal documents reviewed by The Wall Street Journal, but had failed to inform shareholders, which belied his more recent statements he had made at the onset of the DFEH's lawsuit. In another case given in the report, Dan Bunting, the co-founder of Treyarch Studios, had been accused of misconduct in 2017. An internal investigation had led to the suggestion of firing Bunting, but Kotick had reportedly vetoed this move due to his studio's success with the Call of Duty series, and instead he was ordered to see counseling. A second, external review in 2020 of Bunting's behavior found the same conclusion to firing Bunting, but not until the Wall Street Journal began their investigation was Bunting actually removed from the company. The report also describes specific cases of Kotick involved in misconduct, including a case where he threatened to kill an assistant in 2006 which he settled out of court.

=== Concurrent EEOC lawsuit ===
A separate investigation by the Equal Employment Opportunity Commission (EEOC) had been revealed at the same time as the DFEH's and SEC's, having been ongoing since around May 2020. Activision Blizzard and the EEOC were in settlement talks around September 2021 when this investigation was publicly made known. The EEOC filed a formal suit against Activision Blizzard on September 27, 2021, in the Federal District Court for Central California, as it "was unable to secure through informal methods an acceptable conciliation agreement". The lawsuit sought a jury trial to review the EEOC's charges of pervasive sexual harassment and discrimination, as well as an injunction for the company to cease unlawful behavior and pay restitution to affected employees. That day, Activision Blizzard announced it had reached a settlement with the EEOC, pending judicial approval. Among terms of the settlement, the company stated they will create an $18 million compensation fund for employees seeking relief from the prescribed workplace harassment. In a statement, Kotick stated "There is no place anywhere at our company for discrimination, harassment, or unequal treatment of any kind, and I am grateful to the employees who bravely shared their experiences. I am sorry that anyone had to experience inappropriate conduct, and I remain unwavering in my commitment to make Activision Blizzard one of the world's most inclusive, respected, and respectful workplaces."

The settlement offer was criticized by the Campaign to Organize Digital Employees, a project of the Communications Workers of America (CWA), calling the $18 million "mere pennies" compared to the estimated $72 billion net worth of Activision-Blizzard, and "a slap in the face to workers [who have] dealt with toxic working conditions for [years]." The CWA itself also formally objected to the settlement, seeking to involve itself in the legal resolution.

DFEH also stated that the settlement would impact its case and filed their own formal complaint to challenge the settlement. DFEH said that the settlement would remove the employees from protection of California's law which is outside of the jurisdiction of the EEOC, and that provisions of the settlement would allow destruction of evidence needed for its case. EEOC asserted that due to a portion of DFEH's legal team having previously worked on EEOC's own case against Activision Blizzard, that the complaint was an ethics violation and conflict of interest under California law. EEOC requested the complaint to be removed and should DFEH seek to file a new complaint, they would need to do so with new legal counsel and without the information used by the prior one. Activision Blizzard petitioned the court to pause the proceedings of the DFEH case in light of these ethics issues raised by the EEOC as to allow time for limited discovery by their own counsel, as well as to request a change of venue due to the new complexity of the case. The court denied Activision-Blizzard's request to halt the suit in October 2021, but did grant them the ability to evaluate the ethics issue at the basis of the dispute. The court also denied California's request to intervene in the EEOC suit by December 2021, allowing the settlement terms to stand.

Attorney Lisa Bloom, representing a female Activision Blizzard employee who claimed she was fired for whistleblowing in regards to the workplace misconduct, claimed that the $18 million fund the company had set up was too low, and demanded the company increase that to $100 million with victims of the workplace harassment having stronger influence on the fund's use.

Jessica Gonzalez, a former QA tester and founder of A Better ABK appealed the settlement, but it was struck down by the courts on March 22, 2022. The court subsequently accepted the terms of the $18 million settlement between EEOC and Activision Blizzard on March 29, 2022, with terms that prevented those employees that took the settlement offer from being part of the ongoing DFEH action.

=== Wrongful death lawsuit ===
The parents of Kerri Moynihan, who had been a finance manager at Activision Blizzard before committing suicide at age 32 during a corporate retreat in 2017, filed a wrongful death lawsuit against the company in March 2022. The family claimed that their daughter's former boss Greg Restituito "initially lied to investigators in the Anaheim Police Department who were looking into her death in a hotel room at Disney's Grand Californian Hotel & Spa", highlighting that he had concealed his quid pro quo sexual relationship with her in police interviews, as well as the company's attempts to cover up evidence of the situation by e.g. concealing certain communications between Moynihan and Restituito. A March 2022 Washington Post article stated:

According to the lawsuit, Activision Blizzard then refused to turn over to police Moynihan's company-issued laptop, said that her cellphone had been "wiped," and also refused to give them access to Restituito's laptop or cellphone.

The lawsuit also alleged that the "hostile, intimidating, offensive, and abusive" workplace fostered at Activision Blizzard was, in itself, a significant factor contributing to Moynihan's death.

However, by June 2022, the family filed a request for dismissal of the suit with prejudice.

=== Harassment and discrimination lawsuit ===
A separate lawsuit using information discovered by DFEH was filed by attorney Lisa Bloom on behalf of a current employee going as "Jane Doe" asserting that she faced discrimination and harassment at Activision Blizzard, was discouraged from reporting incidents to management, and faced repercussions in her employment status when she did report these matters.

=== Allegations of interference by governor's office ===
DFEH chief counsel Janette Wipper and her deputy Melanie Proctor both stood down from the case early in April 2022 for undisclosed reasons; Wipper was later fired as chief counsel by California Governor Gavin Newsom. Proctor resigned on April 12, 2022, in protest to Wipper's firing. She accused Newsom and his office of interfering with the lawsuit, particularly that the governor's office "repeatedly demanded advance notice of litigation strategy and of next steps in the litigation" and was "mimicking the interests of Activision's counsel", and wrote that Wipper had attempted to protect the agency's independence, which resulted in her termination. Newsom's office has denied the allegations.

=== Countersuit by Activision Blizzard ===
Activision Blizzard filed its own lawsuit against the CRD in December 2022, claiming the agency was working with news agencies as to create a "media war" against the company, nor revealed its ties with the media or the CWA in necessary court documents. Activision Blizzard also asserted that the CRD did not attempt to mediate with the company prior to filing the lawsuit in 2021.

== Response ==
=== Activision Blizzard management ===
On July 21, 2021, the day the lawsuit became public, Activision Blizzard responded with a public statement that the allegations did not accurately portray the company's current culture. In the statement, they described the suit as irresponsible, the allegations as distorted and false, and the DFEH as "unaccountable state bureaucrats". The company alleged that DFEH did not engage in "good faith discussions" before opting to start legal proceedings, though DFEH wrote in their filing that they had not been able to resolve issues with Activision Blizzard in mandatory dispute resolution.

Blizzard president J. Allen Brack, who was one of several executives named directly in the complaint, sent an internal email to all employees on July 21, stating that any of the behavior described in the lawsuit was "completely unacceptable", and encouraging employees to speak out to executive management or external support about any concerns they had with sexual harassment and discrimination within the company.

Separately, Activision executive Fran Townsend sent an internal letter to employees on July 23 that reiterated the company's public statement, saying "a recently filed lawsuit presented a distorted and untrue picture of our company, including factually incorrect, old, and out of context stories – some from more than a decade ago" and that the lawsuit was "truly meritless and irresponsible". Townsend's letter raised concerns among employees, and Townsend held an internal teleconference that day with members of the Activision-Blizzard-King Women's Network, which she had been sponsoring. She explained her email in the teleconference by stating that she had been following advice given to her by the legal department, which she said had made the letter sound unlike her. Employees were not fully satisfied with her explanation, and later that day, Townsend stepped down from sponsoring the Women's Network. The letter reportedly upset some employees with its dismissive nature of problems within the company, and several sought Townsend's resignation. The November 2021 Wall Street Journal report on Kotick's involvement with workplace allegations revealed that Kotick had written this email and instructed Townsend to send it. Kotick's representative stated that "Ms. Townsend should not be blamed for this mistake."

On August 3, 2021, Brack announced he was leaving Activision Blizzard, and that Jen Oneal and Mike Ybarra would take over leadership of the company. Oneal had been a lead of Vicarious Visions, one of Activision's studios that had been recently merged into Blizzard; Ybarra was a Blizzard executive vice president. Later that day, Activision Blizzard's global head of human relations, Jesse Meschuk, was also confirmed to have been fired. During the company's quarterly investor call on August 3, CEO Bobby Kotick said that the company would take "swift action to ensure a safe and welcoming work environment for all employees", and that "people will be held accountable for their actions. That commitment means that we will not just terminate employees where appropriate, but will also terminate any manager or leader found to have impeded the integrity of our processes for evaluating claims and imposing appropriate consequences". Kotick further stated to the shareholders, "our work environment everywhere we operate will not permit discrimination, harassment or unequal treatment. We will be the company that sets the example for this in our industry. While we've taken many steps towards this objective already, today, we are taking even more". In a statement in October 2021, the company stated that more than 20 employees, including developers and managers, had "exited" the company as a part of their internal evaluation, and more than another 20 employees were reprimanded for their actions. In addition, the company was planning to expand its ethics and compliance team to continue to oversee issues in these areas in the future.

In late October 2021, Kotick announced the company was taking several measures related to issues from the lawsuit, acknowledging that "The guardrails weren't in place everywhere to ensure that our values were being upheld." In addition to increased investment in anti-harassment training and resources to handle reporting of such incidents, the company was dropping the use of mandatory arbitration when dealing with workers' complaints, which had been sought by employee groups, and a zero-tolerance harassment policy within the company. He stated the company's plan to increase women and non-binary hires by 50% over the next ten years, and will annually report on pay comparisons between staff demographics. Further, Kotick stated he was seeking approve from the board to have his salary cut to the minimum state level and removing all current bonuses until the company has resolved the matters around the lawsuits.

In early November 2021, Oneal announced her departure from the company; in the later Wall Street Journal report related to accusations involving Kotick, Oneal stated that she had been "tokenized, marginalized, and discriminated against" from earlier in her career at Activision Blizzard, and had left the company as a decision that was best for her family. Oneal also stated that she had been promoted to co-lead Blizzard with Ybarra but had been initially paid based on her prior role which was less than Ybarra's. Both Oneal and Ybarra had made multiple requests to give Oneal equivalent pay which went unanswered until Oneal announced her resignation from the company.

Following the same Wall Street Journal report, Activision-Blizzard issued a statement denying the report's account. The company claimed the report was "a misleading view of Activision Blizzard and our CEO. . . The WSJ ignores important changes underway to make this the industry's most welcoming and inclusive workplace and it fails to account for the efforts of thousands of employees who work hard every day to live up to their – and our — values." Kotick also said in a statement sent to employees that the report "paints an inaccurate and misleading view of our company, of me personally, and my leadership". The Activision-Blizzard board of directors issued a statement that they remained in support of Kotick towards the goals of addressing the misconduct concerns, stating "The goals we have set for ourselves are both critical and ambitious. The board remains confident in Bobby Kotick's leadership, commitment and ability to achieve these goals." The Board shortly thereafter announced the formation of a "Workplace Responsibility Committee" to oversee the company's progress towards improving workplace conditions.

According to a Wall Street Journal report in January 2022, Activision Blizzard had either pushed out or let go of 37 employees, and disciplined about 44 others as part of their internal investigation of workplace misconduct within the company since the start of DFEH's litigation.

The company brought in Gilbert Casellas, former chair of the EEOC, to led an internal investigation of harassment in the company. Casellas reported in June 2022 that "there was no widespread harassment, pattern or practice of harassment, or systemic harassment at Activision Blizzard or at any of its business units [between 1st September 2016 and 31st December 2021]", and that in reports of harassment at the company, "the amount of misconduct reflected is comparatively low for a company the size of Activision Blizzard".

=== Employees ===
According to Bloomberg News's Jason Schreier, several employees sought Townsend's resignation after she sent the internal letter, which the employees felt was dismissive. Several employees stated publicly on Twitter that they held a work stoppage on July 23, 2021, in response to the letters from Brack and Townsend. Over 2,600 employees of Activision Blizzard signed an open letter demanding the company "recognize the seriousness of these allegations and demonstrate compassion for victims of harassment and assault", and concluding that "we will not be silenced, we will not stand aside, and we will not give up until the company we love is a workplace we can all feel proud to be a part of again". A large walkout was planned by the employees on July 28, 2021, with the organizers stating that "we believe that our values as employees are not being accurately reflected in the words and actions of our leadership." The organizers also demanded that Activision Blizzard end forced arbitration, implement new hiring and promotion guidelines across the company to address discrimination against women, publish all salary and promotion data across all demographic classes, and have the current diversity, equity, and inclusion task force hire a third-party organization to evaluate the company and determine causes and means to prevent future harassment and discrimination.

CEO Bobby Kotick, in a letter sent to all employees on the eve of the walkout, called the company's initial response "quite frankly tone deaf". He said that the company's leadership would be "immediately evaluating managers and leaders across the company" and bringing the law firm WilmerHale to "conduct a review of our policies and procedures to ensure that we have and maintain best practices to promote a respectful and inclusive workplace". Kotick also said that the company would assure hiring managers were complying with diversity directives within the company, removing in-game content deemed to be inappropriate, and creating listening sessions as safe spaces for employees to raise suggestions. Employees responded to Kotick's letter that, while they appreciated that he acknowledged the poor initial response to the lawsuit, there had been no action mentioned towards the demands they had requested on their walkout announcement, and continued with the walkout on July 28, 2021.

In addition to the matters brought up by the DFEH lawsuits, employees speaking to Axios identified that Activision Blizzard's HR departments had a significant hand in preventing any action to address sexual misconduct concerns. Employees told Axios that HR knew of the sexual misconduct reports for a long time but either failed to take action, protected those that were accused of sexual misconduct, or strongly discouraged employees that raised concerns by saying things like "this isn't a fight you want to fight".

Among employee concerns was the engagement of WilmerHale by Activision Blizzard, as the firm is considered to specialize in anti-union messaging and union busting, including participating in preventing Amazon workers from unionizing. Employees across the Activision Blizzard studios, including Activision, Beenox, Blizzard Entertainment, High Moon Studios, Infinity Ward, King, Sledgehammer Games, Raven Software, and Vicarious Visions, announced the formation of the ABK (Activision/Blizzard/King) Workers Alliance on August 3, 2021. The ABK Workers Alliance stated that Kotick's response was not sufficient to address the earlier demands made by employees in regards to resolving the workplace conduct and discrimination issues raised by the DFEH lawsuit. The Alliance rejected the use of WilmerHale as the auditing firm, due to their "pre-existing relationships with Activision Blizzard and its executives" and their past case work "discouraging workers' rights and collective action". Internally, the Alliance outlined steps they could take as employees to help mitigate issues, improve communications between employees, and mentor new employees. The ABK Alliance outlined the harsh conditions that many at Activision Blizzard employees working for quality assurance had, including 50 to 60 hour workweeks on average, being hired on contract and thus lacking benefits and employment security, and hostility towards transgender and other LGBT individuals.

Another employee group, A Better ABK, filed a complaint in conjunction with Communication Workers of America to the National Labor Relations Board in September 2021, asserting that Activision Blizzard had engaged in "coercive behavior" related to their activities in unionization and "discussing forced arbitration".

By November 2021, over 500 employee complaints related to workplace conduct and harassment had been filed with Activision, according to The Wall Street Journal report. Following the Wall Street Journal's report related to Kotick's awareness of past misconduct issues, members of A Better ABK and other employees issued demands for Kotick to be removed from the company. In a statement from A Better ABK, the group said "We have instituted our own Zero Tolerance Policy...We will not be silenced until Bobby Kotick has been replaced as CEO, and continue to hold our original demand for third-party review by an employee-chosen source. We are staging a walkout today. We welcome you to join us." About 150 employees participated in the walk-off the day the Wall Street Journal 's report was published. A petition for Kotick's resignation drew more than 1000 employee signatures, with the employees stating "We, the undersigned, no longer have confidence in the leadership of Bobby Kotick as the CEO of Activision Blizzard. The information that has come to light about his behaviors and practices in the running of our companies runs counter to the culture and integrity we require of our leadership — and directly conflicts with the initiatives started by our peers."

In December 2021, Activision let go of about a dozen contracted quality assurance (QA) staff, or game testers, for Raven Software, despite having made promises of improved wages and other benefits in the months prior. Activision stated that they were in the process of converting about 500 contracted positions across the entire company into full-time staff, but this required them to let go of some contractors. While the action was not directly associated with the lawsuit, the tensions within the company led staff at Raven and later across other divisions of Activison Blizzard to stage another walk-off in protest of Activision's decision. While also trying to "...block the union, reasoning that the union only comprises the 28-employee QA department, while as a whole, Raven Software has around 230 employees". The ABK Workers Alliance announced after the layoffs that alongside ongoing strike action, they were collecting crowdfunding to support a $1 million fund for employees as they began taking steps to organize their own union within the company under the Communications Workers of America. While there had been discussions among employees for unionization in the months prior, the layoffs at Raven Software was considered the tipping point to start the union-forming process. Following this announcement, Brian Bulatao, the company's chief administration officer, sent an email to employees that tried to discourage employees from unionizing. By January 21, 2022, the QA testers remaining at Raven had formed the Game Workers Alliance began seeking Activision Blizzard to recognize it as a union; If recognized, the Game Workers Alliance would be the first union at an AAA video game company. With the union formation, the other workers concluded their strike action. Even talks about a potential "...good faith talks to reach a collective-bargaining agreement for the Raven testers" as olive branch to the unionizing staff.

In January 2022 Blizzard employees sent a letter to Microsoft discussing the buyout of Blizzard and the concerns that came with it. Discussing how they still plan to unionize against Activison Blizzard for better working conditions. Microsoft responded with, "Microsoft respects Activision Blizzard employees' right to choose whether to be represented by a labor organization and we will honor those decisions,". However the response from Activision didn't "failed to respond by the deadline set by the organizing workers, writing that "unfortunately, the parties could not reach an agreement" . This creating a chain effect towards the employees to file for union election that same month to stop the "frat boy" culture they were accustom to. However, there are talks of Blizzard "is back to trying to union-bust". In the midst of this another Blizzard studio started to unionize for better conditions. This was quickly noticed by Blizzard and "An appeal made by Activision Blizzard that blocked Blizzard Albany's QA staff from unionizing has been rejected by the US National Labor Relations Board (NLRB)". However was quickly countered by the NLRB. Company shareholders started a separate investigation to determine if company executives were following proper fiduciary duties under the Securities Exchange Act of 1934 in the wake of DFEH's lawsuit and its impact on Activision Blizzard's stock price. A formal class action lawsuit was filed on behalf of the shareholders on August 3, 2021, in the United States District Court for the Central District of California, asserting that in light of the claims brought by DFEH's suit, Bobby Kotick and other senior management had failed to provide proper oversight to prevent the situations outlined in DFEH's suit, and that several of the past filings that Activision Blizzard made with the U.S. Securities and Exchange Commission (SEC) contained claims that were "materially false". Among specific claims, the suit said that the company failed to inform shareholders that it was under investigation by DFEH, and that the company had knowingly took minimal actual against the sexual misconduct complaints while stating in their SEC filings that "such routine claims and lawsuits are not significant and we do not expect them to have a material adverse effect on our business, financial condition, results of operations, or liquidity". The suit continues that by withholding this information, the company's stock price was "artificially inflated", which negatively affected shareholders. This suit was dismissed by motion in April 2022, the judge stating that the shareholders had failed to meet the threshold to pursue their claims.

A letter from shareholder SOC Investment Group to the management of Activision Blizzard criticized its response and ongoing attempts to mitigate the situation, as it does not go "nearly far enough to address the deep and widespread issues with equity, inclusion, and human capital management". Among concerns SOC raised were lack of means of addressing the replacement of management found to be complicit with the sexual misconduct accusations, including how this would affect bonuses or other benefits, and the use of WilmerHale to perform the internal review partially due to the firm having "a sterling reputation as a defender of the wealthy and connected, but it has no track record of uncovering wrongdoing". SOC implored Activision Blizzard to improve diversity at the management level, tie future bonuses to manage to achieving goals related to diversity and improved workplace conduct, and to have a more thorough Equity Review that evaluates the entire company on concerns raised by all stakeholders including Kotick and the company's employees and customers.

In the wake of The Wall Street Journal's November 2021 report, shareholders led by the SOC Investment Group demanded that Kotick resign as well as the two most-senior board members, threatening that they would not vote them on the board at the next shareholders' vote in June 2022. In their letter to the company's management, they stated "In contrast to past company statements, CEO Bobby Kotick was aware of many incidents of sexual harassment, sexual assault and gender discrimination at Activision Blizzard, but failed either to ensure that the executives and managers responsible were terminated or to recognize and address the systematic nature of the company's hostile workplace culture." They further stated that "Activision Blizzard needs a new CEO, board chair, and lead independent director with the expertise, skill set and conviction to truly change the company's culture. We need to really have a reset button on the board."

The shareholders voted in June 2022 to propose that Activision Blizzard should publish an annual report on abuse, harassment, and discrimination within the company as well as their efforts to combat it. Activision's management responded that they considered the proposal non-binding, but that they will "carefully consider the proposal to enhance our future disclosures".

=== Players and streamers ===
Some players have canceled their subscriptions to games made by Activision Blizzard, though as discussed by Kotaku and Axios, this raised concerns among current employees and some players that doing so might lead to layoffs that would negatively affect the employees they're trying to support. Some World of Warcraft players have staged in-game protests and organized mass log-outs, or organized fundraisers for charities that support women and people of color in gaming and the technology industry.

Several video game streamers on Twitch and other outlets, who had previously focused on Blizzard games, refused to stream these games after the lawsuit came to light, issued statements against the company, and joined in other boycotts and protests. Popular World of Warcraft streamer Asmongold began incorporating updates on the lawsuit and criticism of Activision Blizzard into his WoW streams. Hearthstone streamer Allie "Alliestrasza" Macpherson chose not to publish exclusive details about a new card when the allegations became public, instead creating a video in which she expressed solidarity with employees of the company. Streamers and other prominent members of the video game community urged players not to play any games made by Activision Blizzard on July 28, the day of the employee walkout, comparing playing such games that day to crossing a picket line. Prominent streamers including Brian Kibler and Sean "Day[9]" Plott supported the walkout by not streaming that day, or streaming games made by other companies. Many members of the gaming community showed their support for the walkout with the #ActiBlizzWalkout or #ActBlizzWalkout hashtags on Twitter.

At least three video game news websites, The Gamer, GameXplain, and Prima Games, stated they would not cover any Activision Blizzard gaming news until the situation was resolved.

=== Government ===
In September 2021, the U.S. Securities and Exchange Commission issued subpoenas for several Activision-Blizzard executives, including Kotick, related to the communications made by the company ahead of the DFEH's lawsuit and knowledge of the problems that the lawsuit had identified. The SEC had also requested records from as far back as 2019 related to what management knew of the internal issues related to sexual misconduct and workplace environment issues. Activision Blizzard stated they remained confident of their position and would comply with all requests from these agencies. By February 2022, the SEC had widened their investigation to include former executives and management since 2016. Activision Blizzard settled with the SEC in February 2023, agreeing to pay US$35 million on charges that they "lacked controls and procedures among its separate business units to collect and analyze employee complaints of workplace misconduct."

The treasurers from six states, California, Massachusetts, Illinois, Oregon, Delaware and Nevada, called on Activision Blizzard's board in November 2021 to address the allegations made against the company and their planned response. The states have involved themselves due to the impact of the lawsuit on investments made by the states and their residents. Illinois' treasurer Michael Frerichs said in a separate statement, "We think there needs to be sweeping changes made in the company...We're concerned that the current CEO and board directors don't have the skillset, nor the conviction to institute these sweeping changes needed to transform their culture, to restore trust with employees and shareholders and their partners".

On April 26, 2022, the New York City Employees' Retirement System, a shareholder of Activision Blizzard, sued Activision Blizzard, asserting that they had taken the Microsoft acquisition deal too quickly as to cover up the misconduct of Kotick which had affected the sale price of the company.

=== Others in the game industry ===
Several former Blizzard executives issued public apologies on Twitter. Co-founder and former president and CEO Michael Morhaime stated, "to the Blizzard women who experienced any of these things, I am extremely sorry that I failed you. I hear you, I believe you, and I am so sorry to have let you down". Chris Metzen, former senior vice president in Blizzard, issued a similar apology on Twitter: "We failed, and I'm sorry", adding that "this is later than it should have been". Other former Activision Blizzard employees, including Morhaime and members of Bungie and other Activision studios not at the center of the lawsuit, expressed support of the walkout. Take-Two's CEO Strauss Zelnick stated that "we will not tolerate harassment or discrimination or bad behavior of any kind. We never have" and that their company strives to make options to deal with such harassment or discrimination available open to all employees.

The lawsuit began to draw others outside of Activision Blizzard into the debate on workplace issues in the gaming industry. Nearly 500 employees of Ubisoft, which had similarly been subject to accusations of creating a hostile workplace for women in 2020, wrote an open letter in solidarity with the Activision Blizzard employees, stating that "it should no longer be a surprise to anyone: employees, executives, journalists, or fans that these heinous acts are going on. It is time to stop being shocked. We must demand real steps be taken to prevent them. Those responsible must be held accountable for their actions".

In light of the lawsuit, new calls to push for unionization of video game developers arose. Jeff Strain, a former Blizzard employee, wrote an open letter calling for the video game industry to consider the need to unionize to protect workers from these types of management problems. Carly Kocurek, an associate professor at the Illinois Institute of Technology, said that the response around the Activision Blizzard lawsuit was a "big deal" and could be turning point within the industry for unions to help protect workers right and assure fair treatment. CNN reporter Rishi Iyengar said the case had the potential to be a "watershed moment" for the industry, as it puts not only the male-dominated field in the spotlight but also the practice of drawing on employees' love of gaming rather than paid compensation to coerce extra work out of them (such as during crunch time), a practice that Iyengar wrote was driven by the male-dominated workforce. The Guardian's Kari Paul also reported on other industry analysts and academics who viewed the suit as a possible watershed moment for the industry.

Following the November Wall Street Journal report, video game publications such as Polygon and Windows Central called for Kotick to resign. Jim Ryan, the head of PlayStation at Sony, said that they had reached out to Activision Blizzard after the report was released to see how the company would rectify the situation, but "We do not believe their statements of response properly address the situation." Head of Microsoft's Xbox division, Phil Spencer, said in an email to his employees that he was "disturbed and deeply troubled by the horrific events and actions" reported by the Wall Street Journal, and that they are "evaluating all aspects of our relationship with Activision Blizzard and making ongoing proactive adjustments". Nintendo of America's CEO Doug Bowser stated they have also been in contact with Activision Blizzard, and that "I find these accounts distressing and disturbing. They run counter to my values as well as Nintendo's beliefs, values and policies." The Entertainment Software Association, the American trade association for video games, stated that "harassment, abuse, or mistreatment in the workplace is unacceptable and must never be tolerated". The non-profit group Girls Who Code severed ties with Activision Blizzard, stating that they "cannot in good conscience" continue to work with the company.

Microsoft announced its intent to acquire Activision Blizzard in January 2022 for $68.7 billion, with the deal finalized in October 2023. Kotick stated that the company accepted the deal due to its weakening stock position that made it hard to compete with other companies in the video game market; while he said that factors such as delays to Overwatch 2 and Diablo 4, along with the poor reception to Call of Duty: Vanguard, were among reasons for their weak position, he also attributed the DFEH lawsuit as a factor. This statement of Kotick was criticized by employees, with one engineer saying the statement is "Throwing game devs under the bus rather than taking responsibility for the culture he helped to foster."

In Activision Blizzard's SEC filings related to Microsoft's acquisition, Microsoft had approached the company in the days following the November 2021 Wall Street Journal report to reopen talks about acquisition. Both The Wall Street Journal and Bloomberg News reported that while Activision Blizzard's board had been considering buyout options, the board had become anxious of Kotick's leadership following the November 2021 Wall Street Journal report and quickly agreed to Microsoft's buyout as to give a graceful exit for Kotick. While the deal is reviewed by regulatory agencies, Kotick remained as CEO of Activision Blizzard. While another report from The Wall Street Journal suggested that Kotick "will depart once the deal closes" under Microsoft's management, in an interview Kotick has shown interest in remaining in the company.

== Impact ==
The lawsuit forced Blizzard to cancel its planned livestream reveal of an upcoming Hearthstone expansion in early August, as the company frequently seeds information through streamers before their own official broadcast, and these streamers had boycotted Blizzard. Instead, the company posted an announcement related to the new expansion with minimal fanfare. Lead designer for Hearthstone, Dean Ayala, stated that "Having any celebration is a hard sell right now. I can assure you the only hesitation we have with moving forward with things like streams or card reveals is out of the respect for our co-workers". The development team for World of Warcraft stated they would be removing content from both the main game and World of Warcraft Classic that is "not appropriate for our world" in light of the lawsuit, including in-game characters made in reference to Afrasiabi, and that their team is "committed to taking the actions necessary to ensure we are providing an inclusive, welcoming, and safe environment both for our team and for our players in Azeroth". Casters for the Overwatch League opted to avoid saying the name of McCree, one of the game's playable characters, and instead used "the cowboy", following reports that the character's namesake, Jesse McCree, was no longer with the company in August 2021. Subsequently, late that August, Blizzard confirmed it will change McCree's name to "something that better represents what Overwatch stands for", though will need to review their narrative state of the game to determine what the new name will be. McCree's new name, Cole Cassidy, was introduced and replaced the McCree name in an October 2021 patch to Overwatch, and a special in-game event planned for McCree was pushed out until November 2021, now named for Cassidy and featuring a digital comic that spoke to Cassidy finding a new identity. Blizzard stated that they will cease naming any characters in any of their games after employees in the future and will be "more thoughtful and discerning about adding real world references". The Warcraft team within Blizzard also announced similar plans to rename characters that had been based on employee names following the Overwatch announcement, as well as renaming quests and other items with offensive titles.

Blizzard opted not to hold their annual BlizzCon event for 2022, stating that they would instead spend the time "supporting our teams and progressing development of our games and experiences", and that for future events "we also need to ensure that it feels as safe, welcoming, and inclusive as possible".

T-Mobile had sponsored both the Overwatch League and Call of Duty League, but about two weeks after the DFEH lawsuit was announced, reporters for Polygon and Dexerto observed that both Leagues had removed all T-Mobile branding from the website and online broadcasts, and had covered up T-Mobile's logo on player uniforms. These sites believe that T-Mobile pulled its support of the Leagues due to the lawsuit, though they were unable to confirm with T-Mobile. Both Coca-Cola and State Farm issued statements that they would step back from Overwatch League sponsorship and reconsider their position in light of the lawsuit. Kellogg's stated they would not continue their sponsorship of the Overwatch League. Sports Business Journal observed that IBM's branding was removed from all Overwatch League media, including the league's official partners' page and power rankings. Furthermore, the U.S. Army has pulled its sponsorship from the Call of Duty Esports League.

Geoff Keighley, the creator and host of The Game Awards, said that he was reevaluating the show's relationship with Blizzard, adding that he wanted the show to support employees and developers without diminishing individual achievements. After Kotaku's Ethan Gach criticized Keighley for refusing to "take sides" and noted that the show's advisory board included Activision president Rob Kostich, Keighley stated that Blizzard would not be part of the 2021 ceremony outside of its nominated games.
