= Jessica González =

Jessica González may refer to:

- Jessica González (politician), member of the Texas House of Representatives
- Jessica Gonzalez (labor organizer), American labor organizer

== See also ==
- Jessica González-Rojas, member of the New York State Assembly
