= Kooy =

Kooy is a surname. Notable people with the surname include:

- Chris Kooy (1982–2020), Canadian soccer player
- Dick Kooy (born 1987), Dutch-born Italian volleyball player
- Manfred Kooy (born 1970), Dutch Paralympian athlete
- Peter Kooy (born 1954), Dutch bass singer

== See also ==
- Koos (name)
