= Ras cannons =

Martienie Cannon at Denel in Erasmuskloof, Pretoria.

The Ras Cannons were the first cannons built in South Africa. The two cannons were constructed during the First Boer War on a farm Bokfontein in Brits district.

They were built during a two-week period by Marthinus Nikolaas Ras, who is considered the father of South African Artillery, and his cousin, Eduard Dawid Ras who was a talented blacksmith.

In December 1880, Ras requested and obtained permission from General Piet Cronjé to return home to his farm Bokfontein, near Brits, to build a cannon for the Boer forces.

== "Martienie" Cannon ==
Marthinus Ras next to the Martienie Cannon.

Marthinus Nikolaas Ras bought a number of iron shod wagon wheels from a dealer in Rustenburg, which were melted down and from which the cannons were cast.

The first cannon, a 3-inch caliber named "Martienie" after Marthinus Ras, fired a 7-pound lead ball from a 4½ feet barrel. The breech plug of the cannon was damaged during the first test firing of the cannon, which necessitated some adjustments from the manufacturer. The damaged cannon breech was replaced by a reinforced breech (see picture) and the cannon was then mounted on a small wagon axle and wheels.

The "Martienie" cannon was moved to the front and deployed by Commandant Eloff against the British garrison at Rustenburg. It was first fired from 2000 feet, then later from 800 and 600 feet. Between the 8 and 9 January 1881 it was used to fire 93 shots on the British fort, which led to the subsequent surrender of the fort.

== "Ras" Cannon ==
The second cannon, built at a later stage, was dubbed "Ras". It was smaller than "Martienie," being a 2-inch caliber, but it had a longer barrel measuring 5½ feet in length. "Ras" was designed to fire an elongated bullet-shaped projectile, which was (2 inches wide and 4½ inches long). However, despite its design, the cannon was never deployed operationally during the war.

Following the war, "Ras" was sent as an exhibit to Europe and was displayed at the 1900 World Fair in Paris. It remained in Europe until after the conclusion of the Second Boer War when it was finally returned to South Africa.

== After the war ==
The “Martienie” cannon was used after the war to fire the noon signal in Pretoria.

In 1885 a mad Austrian named Compolier loaded the cannon with rocks, aimed and fired it at the State Presidential residence in Pretoria. The shot severely damaged the cannon, and it was subsequently moved to a museum. When the British marched into Pretoria in 1900, it was already a museum piece, otherwise it would probably have met the same fate as the other Boer war cannons, which were sent to England to be melted down.

The two Ras cannons survive today. "Ras" is displayed at Fort Schanskop in Pretoria, and "Martienie" at Denel in Erasmuskloof, Pretoria.

== Honours ==
After the Second World War, the 26 Field Artillery Regiment of the South African Transvaal Artillery gunner regiments, named their two senior batteries "MARTIENIE" and "RAS" after the two homemade cannons built by Martinus Ras. He was further honoured in 1981 by the regiment, by the firing of a Salute at a memorial service to celebrate the achievements of the gunmaker, 100 years after the manufacture of the first gun.

== Sources ==
- L.S. Bothma; C.M. Woest; L. Groesbeek (2005). Ras-Geslagsregister. L.S. Botma & C.M. Woest. ISBN 0-620-32329-9.
