= 26 Field Artillery =

26 Field Artillery Regiment
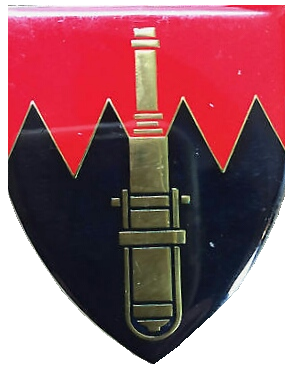
- 26 Field Artillery Regiment emblem
- Active: 1976
- Country: South Africa
- Allegiance: Republic of South Africa
- Branch: South African Army
- Type: Artillery
- Size: Regiment
- Part of: South African Army Artillery Corps; Army Conventional Reserve
- Garrison/HQ: Voortrekkerhoogte

Insignia
- Collar Badge: Bursting grenade with seven flames
- Beret Colour: Oxford Blue
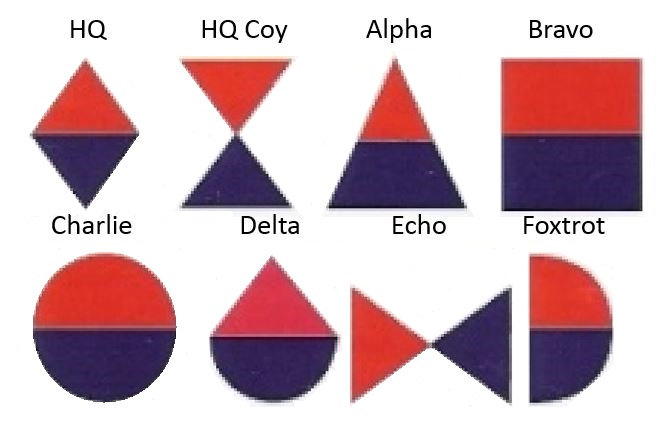
- Artillery Battery Emblems

- Artillery Beret Bar circa 1992

26 Field Artillery Regiment was an artillery regiment of the South African Artillery.

== History ==
=== Origins ===
This unit was originally formed as the first Field Artillery Regiment for the Northern Transvaal Command on 1 July 1976 and was based in Voortrekkerhoogte, south of Pretoria.

=== First Personnel ===
Its first intake of personnel came from roughly 100 members of 14 Field Artillery Regiment who had served in Operation Savanah as part of Combat Groups Oranje and Zulu that were involved most notably in the battle for Bridge 14.

=== Headquarters ===
By 1981 the regiment's headquarters was transferred to Group 15 in Hendrik Potgieter Street in the CBD, but later returned to Voortrekkerhoogte.

=== Command ===
The regiment was transferred to the command of Eastern Transvaal Command in 1984 as a conventional field regiment.

The regiment was also affiliated with 8th Armoured Division in the conventional context.

=== Traditions from the Anglo Boer War ===
The regiments two senior batteries were named after two guns used in the Anglo Boer War, namely the Martieni and Ras.

=== Operations ===
Members of the regiment were utilised in the Soutpansberg Military Area on the border area with Zimbabwe.

=== Traditions ===
On the 100th year celebration of the Ras gun, the regiment celebrated with a salute in Bokfontein near Brits in 1981, the hometown of the guns developer.

=== Insignia ===
The regiment's insignia is based on the Ras gun of the Anglo Boer War with the typical artillery colours as background.

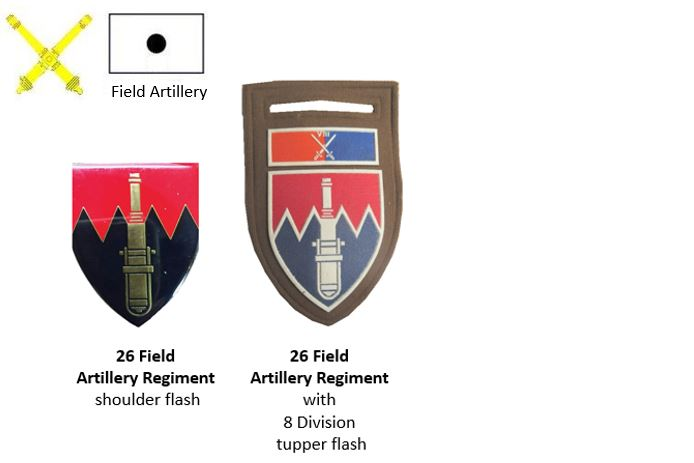
SADF era 26 Field Artillery Regiment insignia
