= Jessica Gonzalez (labor organizer) =

American labor organizer

- Born: 1992 or 1993 (age 33–34)
- Occupation: Labor organizer
- Employer: CODE-CWA
- Known for: Labor organizing
- Notable work: A Better ABK; ABK Workers Alliance; Game Workers Alliance

Jessica Gonzalez (born 1992 or 1993) is an American labor organizer working with CODE-CWA, the Communication Workers of America's Campaign to Organize Digital Employees. She is known for her work organizing in the video game industry and founding A Better ABK, the worker advocacy group at Activision Blizzard, and co-founding ABK Workers Alliance, a solidarity union, and Game Workers Alliance, the Raven Software union.

== Career and activism ==
Gonzalez joined Activision Blizzard (ABK) in 2015 as a quality assurance (QA) tester. She left the company for a few years to work for Boundless Entertainment, but returned to ABK in 2019 until leaving the company in 2021 due to what she alleged to be a hostile working environment. She worked briefly for a financial tech company following her departure, while working part-time as an organizer with CODE-CWA. She later joined CODE-CWA full-time.

Gonzalez also alleged that in QA at ABK, testers were treated as "second-class citizens", which ABK denies. A former colleague told Axios that Gonzalez "was the spark that started the explosion", referring to the founding of A Better ABK, which was founded in 2021 following a walkout in protest of the company's response to accusations of sexual harassment and discrimination. Gonzalez and the worker organizers staged further walkouts during 2021 and 2022.

Shortly after leaving ABK, Gonzalez, along with other A Better ABK organizers, started a strike fund on GoFundMe to help organizers take unpaid time off to participate in the group's walk-outs.

In 2021, Gonzalez helped form ABK Workers' Alliance.

In 2022, she and former colleague Josh Miller began a podcast on the streaming platform Twitch called Weekly Standup discussing worker's rights and unionization in tech. Also in 2022, Gonzalez appealed the $18 million settlement Equal Employment Opportunity Commission's concurrent California Department of Fair Employment and Housing v. Activision Blizzard lawsuit, which was struck down by the courts on March 22, 2022.

In 2022, Gonzalez co-founded Game Workers Alliance (GWA), a union made up of QA testers at Raven Software, a Subsidiary of ABK. GWA is the first labor union at a AAA games developer. Also in 2022, she, along with 11 other current and former ABK employees, formed an anti-discrimination committee.

== Personal life ==
Gonzalez lives in San Pedro, Los Angeles.

== See also ==
- Emma Kinema
- Jaz Brisack
- Sara Nelson
- Cher Scarlett
