= Activision Blizzard =

American video game holding company

Activision Blizzard, Inc.
- Logo used since 2008

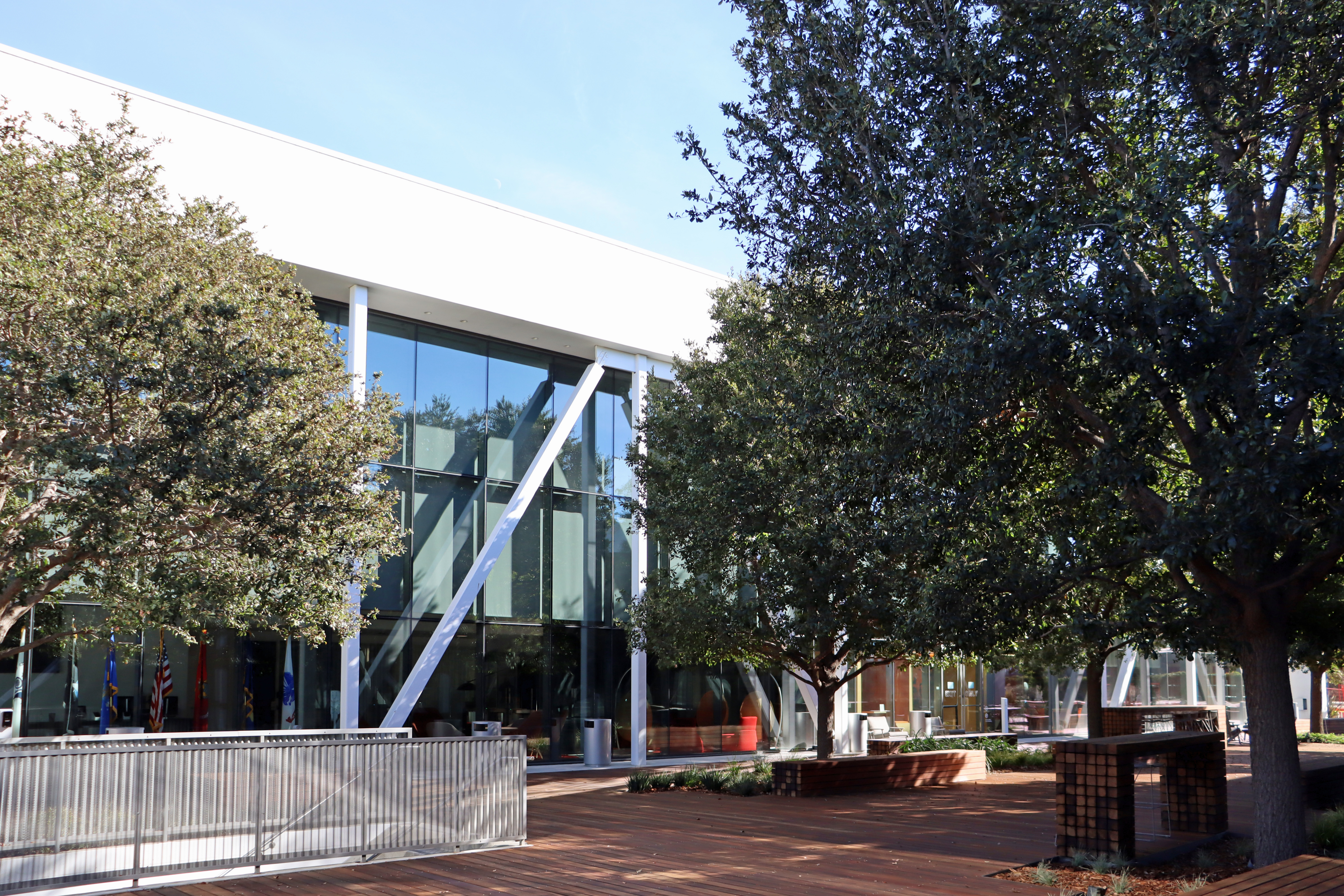
- Headquarters in Santa Monica
- Type: Subsidiary
- Traded as: Nasdaq: ATVI (2008–2023)
- Industry: Video games
- Predecessors: Activision, Inc.; Vivendi Games
- Founded: July 9, 2008; 18 years ago
- Headquarters: Santa Monica, California, US
- Products: Call of Duty series; Crash Bandicoot series; Guitar Hero series; Skylanders series; Spyro series; Tony Hawk's series; Diablo series; Hearthstone; Heroes of the Storm; Overwatch series; StarCraft series; Warcraft series
- Revenue: US$7.53 billion (2022)
- Operating income: US$1.67 billion (2022)
- Net income: US$1.51 billion (2022)
- Total assets: US$27.4 billion (2022)
- Total equity: US$19.2 billion (2022)
- Number of employees: 17,000 (2023)
- Parent: Vivendi (2008–2013); Xbox (2023–present)
- Divisions: Activision Blizzard Consumer Products Group; Activision Blizzard Esports; Activision Blizzard Media
- Subsidiaries: Activision; Blizzard Entertainment
- Website: activisionblizzard.com

Activision Blizzard, Inc. (Note: Following the acquisition of King, Activision Blizzard is sometimes referred to as ABK (Activision-Blizzard-King).) is an American video game holding company based in Santa Monica, California. Activision Blizzard currently includes two operating units: Activision and Blizzard Entertainment.

Founded in July 2008 through the merger of Activision, Inc. and Vivendi Games, the company owns and operates additional subsidiary studios, as part of Activision, including Infinity Ward, Treyarch, and Sledgehammer Games. Among major intellectual properties produced by Activision Blizzard are Call of Duty, Crash Bandicoot, Guitar Hero, Skylanders, Spyro, Tony Hawk's, Diablo, Hearthstone, Heroes of the Storm, Overwatch, StarCraft, and World of Warcraft. Under Blizzard Entertainment, it invested in esports initiatives around several of its games, most notably Overwatch and Call of Duty. Activision Blizzard's titles have broken a number of release records. As of March 2018, it was the largest game company in the Americas and Europe in terms of revenue and market capitalization.

The company has also been involved in multiple notable controversies, including allegations of infringed patents and unpaid royalties. In late July 2021, it was sued by the California Department of Fair Employment and Housing on allegations of sexual harassment and employee discrimination. The suit triggered an investigation by the U.S. Securities and Exchange Commission, multiple workplace walkouts, the resignation or dismissal of several employees, the loss of multiple company event sponsors, and hundreds of workplace harassment allegations.

Microsoft announced its intent to acquire Activision Blizzard for $68.7 billion on January 18, 2022. The acquisition was completed on October 13, 2023. Activision Blizzard is a subsidiary of Xbox along with Xbox Game Studios and ZeniMax Media.

== History ==
=== Background and formation (2007–2008) ===
The original Activision company was founded in 1979, as a third-party developer for games on the Atari Video Computer System. In 1988 the company expanded into non-gaming software and renamed itself Mediagenic. This venture was not successful, incurring heavy losses. In 1991 a group of investors led by Bobby Kotick bought the company. Kotick instituted a large restructuring to reduce debt, including renaming the company back to Activision and moving it to Santa Monica, California. By 1997 the company was profitable again. Kotick spent the next decade expanding Activision's products through acquisitions of around 25 studios. This resulted in Activision publishing several successful series of games, including Tony Hawk's, Call of Duty, and Guitar Hero. However, by around 2006, the popularity of massively multiplayer online (MMO) games started to grow. Such games provide a constant revenue stream to their publishers, rather than only a single purchase, making them a more valuable proposition. None of Activision's subsidiaries had an MMO or the capability to make one quickly. Activision was also facing tougher competition from companies like Electronic Arts, as well as slowdowns in sales of its key game series.

Around 2006, Kotick reached out to Jean-Bernard Lévy, the CEO of the French media conglomerate Vivendi. Vivendi at that time had the games division Vivendi Games, a holding company principally for Sierra Entertainment and Blizzard Entertainment. Kotick wanted to get access to Blizzard's World of Warcraft, a successful MMO, and suggested a means to acquire this to Lévy. Lévy instead offered that he would be willing to merge Vivendi Games with Activision, but only if Vivendi kept majority control of the merged company. According to those close to Kotick, Kotick was concerned about this offer as it would force him to cede control of Activision. However, after talking to Blizzard's CEO Mike Morhaime, Kotick recognized that Vivendi would be able to give it inroads into the growing video game market in China.

Kotick proposed the merger to Activision's board, which agreed to it in December 2007. The new company was to be named Activision Blizzard and would retain its central headquarters in California. Bobby Kotick of Activision was announced as the new president and CEO, while René Penisson of Vivendi was appointed chairman. The European Commission permitted the merger to take place in April 2008, approving that there weren't any EU antitrust issues in the merger deal. On July 8, 2008, Activision announced that stockholders had agreed to merge, and the deal closed the next day for an estimated transaction amount of US$18.9 billion.

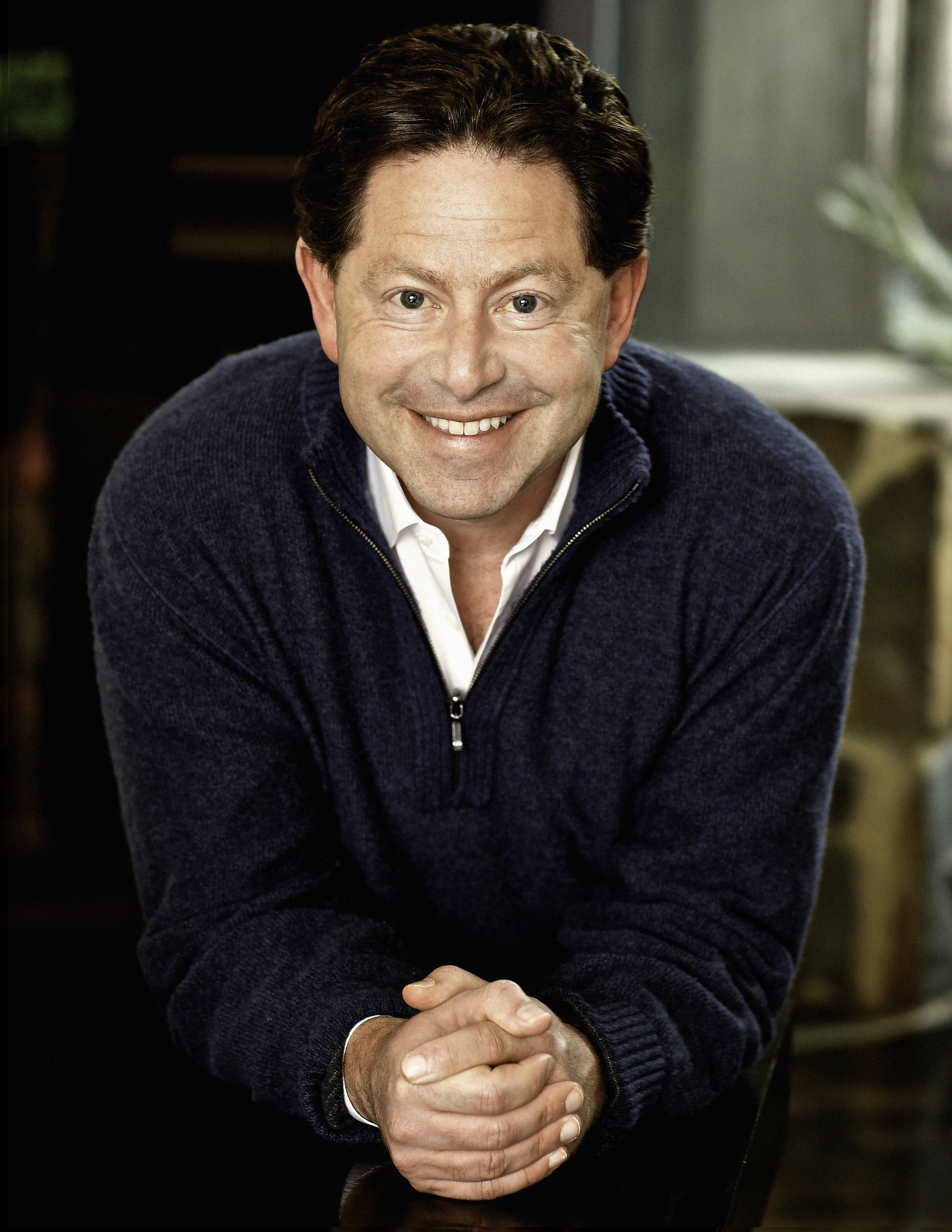
Bobby Kotick (pictured in 2012) was the CEO of Activision Blizzard from 2008 to 2023.

Vivendi became the combined company's majority shareholder at 54% of outstanding shares, equating to 52% if shares were to be fully diluted. The rest of the shares were held by institutional and private investors, and were to be left open for trading on the NASDAQ stock market for a time under the ticker symbol ATVID, and subsequently as ATVI (Activision's stock ticker). At this point, Lévy replaced René Penisson as chairman of Activision Blizzard. The merger was completed on July 9. While Blizzard retained its autonomy and corporate leadership in the merger, other Vivendi Games divisions such as Sierra ceased operation. With the merger, Kotick was quoted stating if a Sierra product did not meet Activision's requirements, they "won't likely be retained." Some of these games ultimately were published by other studios, including Ghostbusters: The Video Game, Brütal Legend, The Chronicles of Riddick: Assault on Dark Athena, and 50 Cent: Blood on the Sand. However, a number of Sierra's games such as Crash Bandicoot, Spyro, and Prototype were retained and are now published by Activision.

=== New titles and sales records (2009–2012) ===
In early 2010, the independent studio Bungie entered into a 10-year publishing agreement with Activision Blizzard. By the end of 2010, Activision Blizzard was the largest video games publisher in the world. The 2011 release of Activision Blizzard's Call of Duty: Modern Warfare 3 grossed $400 million in the US and UK alone in its first 24 hours, making it the biggest entertainment launch of all time. It was also the third consecutive year the Call of Duty series broke the biggest launch record; 2010's Call of Duty: Black Ops grossed $360 million on day one; and 2009's Call of Duty: Modern Warfare 2 brought in $310 million. Call of Duty: Black Ops III grossed $550 million in worldwide sales during its opening weekend in 2015, making it the biggest entertainment launch of the year.

In 2011, Activision Blizzard debuted its Skylanders franchise, which led to the press crediting the company with inventing and popularizing a new toys-to-life category. The first release Skylanders: Spyro's Adventure was nominated for two Toy Industry Association awards in 2011: "Game of the Year" and "Innovative Toy of the Year". Skylanders: Spyro's Adventure and its sequels were released for major consoles and PC, and many were released on mobile devices as well.

=== Split from Vivendi and growth (2013–2014) ===
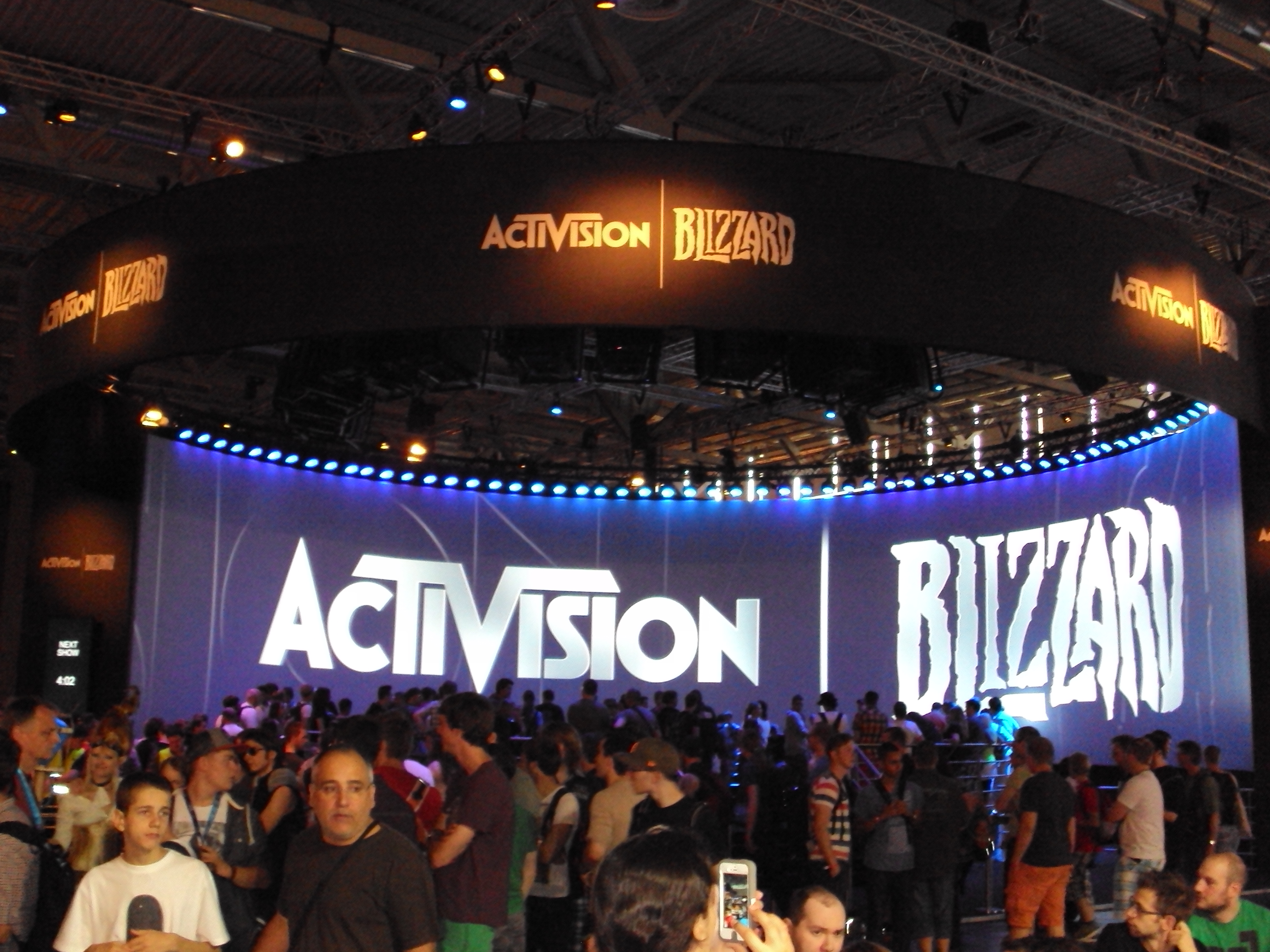
Activision Blizzard at Gamescom 2013, where the company exhibited 2013 titles such as Call of Duty: Ghosts and Skylanders: Swap Force

On July 25, 2013, Activision Blizzard announced the purchase of 429 million shares from owner Vivendi for $5.83 billion, dropping the shareholder from a 63% stake to 11.8% by the end of the deal in September. At the conclusion of the deal, Vivendi was no longer Activision Blizzard's parent company, and Activision Blizzard became an independent company as a majority of the shares became owned by the public. Bobby Kotick and Brian Kelly retained a 24.4% stake in the company overall. In addition, Kotick remained the president and CEO, with Brian Kelly taking over as chairman. On October 12, 2013, shortly after approval from the Delaware Supreme Court, the company completed the buyback, along the lines of the original plan. Vivendi sold half its remaining stake on May 22, 2014, reducing its ownership to 5.8%. and completely exited two years later.

Activision Blizzard released a new title, Destiny, on September 9, 2014. The game made over $500 million in retail sales on the first day of release, setting a record for the biggest first day launch of a new gaming franchise. On November 5, 2013, the company released Call of Duty: Ghosts, which was written by screenwriter Stephen Gaghan. On its first release day the game sold $1 billion into retail. In 2014, Activision Blizzard was the fifth largest gaming company by revenue worldwide, with total assets of US$14.746 billion and total equity estimated at US$7.513 billion.

=== S&P 500 and new divisions (2015–2021) ===
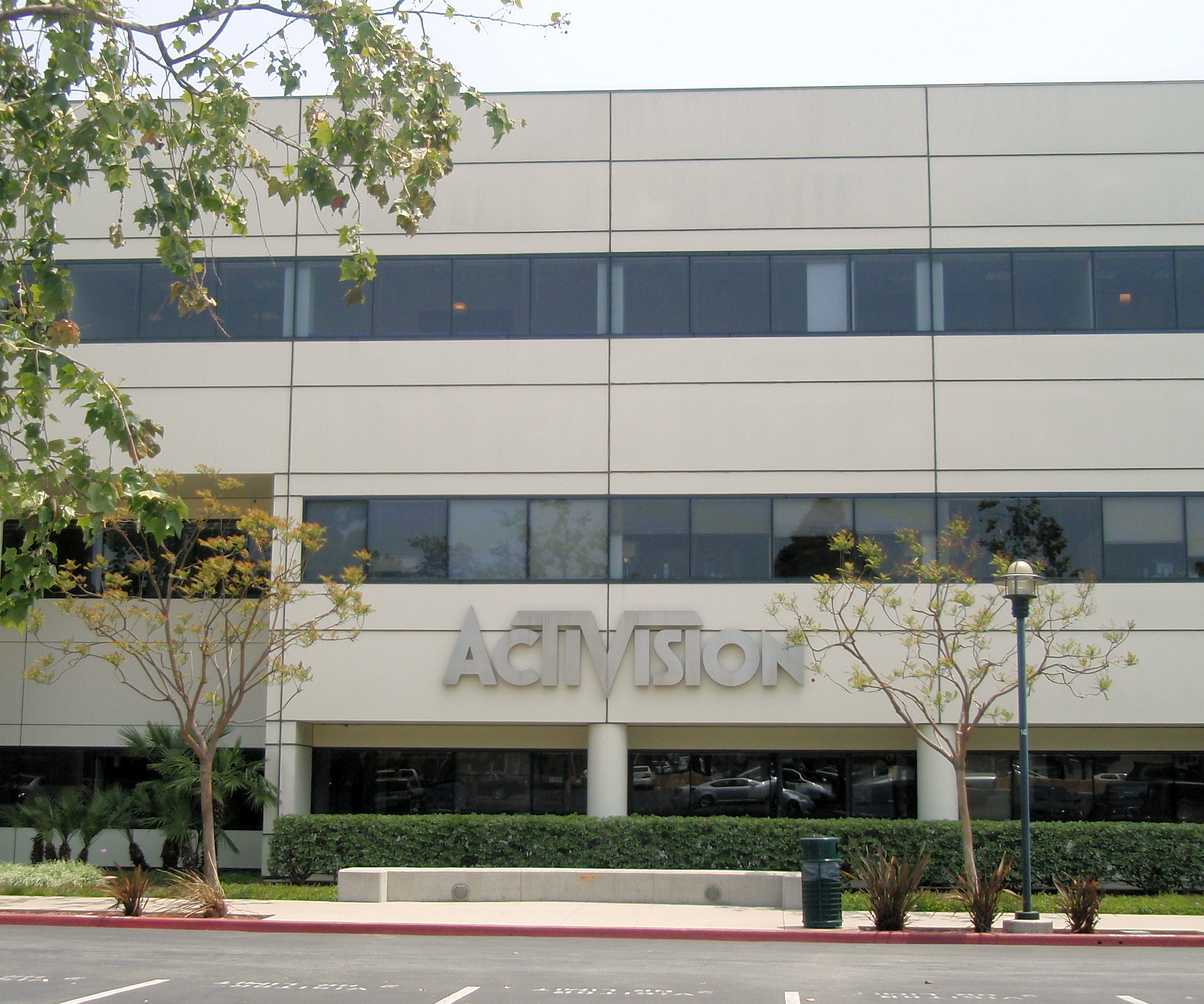
Activision's former headquarters in Santa Monica, which also served as Activision Blizzard's headquarters

Activision Blizzard joined the S&P 500 stock index on August 28, 2015, becoming one of only two companies on the list related to gaming, alongside Electronic Arts. The company released the next iteration of the Skylanders franchise in September 2015, which added vehicles to the "toys to life" category. On September 15, 2015, Activision and Bungie released Destiny: The Taken King, the follow-up to the Destiny saga. Two days later, Sony announced that the game broke the record for the most downloaded day-one game in PlayStation history, in terms of both total players and peak online concurrency.

Activision Blizzard acquired social gaming company King, creator of casual game Candy Crush Saga, for $5.9 billion in November 2015.

In November 2015, Activision Blizzard announced the formation of Activision Blizzard Studios, a film production arm that would produce films and television series based on Activision Blizzard's franchises. The outfit is co-headed by producer Stacey Sher and former The Walt Disney Company executive Nick van Dyk.

In June 2017, Activision Blizzard joined the Fortune 500 becoming the third gaming company in history to make the list after Atari and Electronic Arts.

In its 2018 fiscal year earnings call to shareholders in February 2019, Kotick stated that while the company had seen a record year in revenue, it would be laying off around 775 people or around 8% of its workforce in non-management divisions, "de-prioritizing initiatives that are not meeting expectations and reducing certain non-development and administrative-related costs across the business", according to Kotick. Kotick stated that they plan to put more resources towards their development teams and focus on esports, Battle.net services, and the publisher's core games which include Candy Crush, Call of Duty, Overwatch, Warcraft, Diablo, and Hearthstone. Prior to this, Activision Blizzard and Bungie agreed to terminate their distribution deal with Destiny 2 as it was not bringing in expected revenue for Activision, with Bungie otherwise retaining all rights to Destiny. This transaction allowed Activision Blizzard to report US$164 million as part of its 2018 fiscal year filings. During 2018, Activision was one of 90 Fortune 500 companies to have "paid an effective federal tax rate of 0% or less" as a result of Donald Trump's Tax Cuts and Jobs Act of 2017.

The company announced that Daniel Alegre would replace Coddy Johnson as president of Activision Blizzard effective April 7, 2020, with Johnson transitioning to special advisory role.

During the second quarter of 2020, the company's net revenues from digital channels reached $1.44bn due to the growing demand for online games driven by COVID-19 lockdowns. By January 2021, the company's net value was estimated to be $72 billion based on its stock trading price due to the ongoing demand for video games from the COVID-19 pandemic.

The Public Investment Fund of Saudi Arabia acquired 14.9 million shares of Activision Blizzard, valued at $1.4 billion, in February 2021.

In April 2021, Fernando Machado, former Brazilian executive at Burger King, joined the company as chief marketing officer (CMO). The company also announced in April 2021 that Kotick will remain CEO through April 2023, through Kotick agreed to take a 50% cut of his pay, equal to $875,000. Kotick will remain eligible to receive annual bonuses, and while he agreed to reduce his target bonus by 50% as well, he potentially can earn up to 200% of his base pay based on the company's performance.

=== Workplace misconduct lawsuit and acquisition by Microsoft (2021–present) ===
On July 20, 2021, the California Department of Fair Employment and Housing (DFEH) filed a suit alleging sexual harassment, employment discrimination and retaliation on the part of Activision Blizzard. A second lawsuit was filed against the company by its shareholders asserting it falsified knowledge of these problems in its financial statements, though this suit was dismissed due to failure to meet thresholds for claims, The Equal Employment Opportunity Commission had also filed suit against Activision-Blizzard from its own investigation of the workplace conditions but the company had settled the same day it was filed, which included setting aside an $18 million relief fund for affected employees. Ultimately, the DFEH and Activision Blizzard agreed to a $54 million settlement in December 2023 to cover pay and promotion inequities at the company, both agreeing there was no substantial evidence of widespread harassment.

On January 18, 2022, Microsoft announced that it would be acquiring Activision Blizzard for $68.7 billion in an all-cash deal, or approximately $95 per share. Activision Blizzard's stock price jumped nearly 40% that day in pre-market trading. The deal would make Microsoft the third-largest gaming company in the world and the largest headquartered in the Americas, behind Chinese company Tencent and the Japanese conglomerate Sony. Activision Blizzard's shareholders approved of the acquisition near-unanimously in April 2022. While the deal has been approved by several countries ahead of the planned October 18, 2023, deal closure, including the European Union and China, both the United States' Federal Trade Commission and the United Kingdom's Competition and Markets Authority have challenged the merger as anticompetitive and have initiated legal procedures in their respective countries.

To resolve these issues, Microsoft agreed to outsource the cloud gaming rights of Activision Blizzard's games to Ubisoft, which was cleared by regulators. The acquisition was completed on October 13, 2023. The last time Activision Blizzard reported its annual financial results for its shareholders before Microsoft acquired it was on February 6, 2023. Activision Blizzard reported $7.54 billion in revenue and $1.52 billion in net income. As part of the acquisition deal, Kotick announced his resignation as CEO the same day, along with other high level executives, though Kotick will remain onboard through the end of 2023 to help with the transition. Bobby Kotick departed Activision Blizzard on December 29, 2023.

In May 2022, QA testers of Activision Blizzard subsidiary Raven Software went public as the Game Workers Alliance (GWA) with the support of Campaign to Organize Digital Employees-CWA and voted to unionize with a count of 19 – 2 in favor. The National Labor Relations Board recognized GWA as a union.

Following the Raven Software's successful unionization, the 20-member QA team of Blizzard Albany announced a unionization drive in July 2022 as GWA Albany. The vote passed (14–0), forming the second union at an Activision Blizzard subsidiary.

In February 2023, Activision Blizzard announced to employees that it would end its full-time remote policy starting between April and June that year. On November 30, quality assurance staffers were told that the company would end its hybrid work model and bring employees in Austin, Texas, Eden Prairie, Minnesota and El Segundo, California back to the office full time in 2024. ABK Workers Alliance accused the company of forcing out employees with this decision.

On March 8, 2024, 600 QA testers at 3 Activision studios in Austin, Eden Prairie, and El Segundo formed the union "Activision Quality Assurance United-CWA" and voted to unionize (390–8) in favor, making it the largest video game union in the United States. Microsoft voluntarily recognized the union. On July 24, 2024, 500 artists, designers, engineers, producers, and quality assurance testers who work on World of Warcraft also voted to unionize.

In July 2026, as part of a major restructuring within Microsoft's gaming business, King was made to report directly to Asha Sharma of the Xbox division. In September 2026, Microsoft transferred World’s Edge, Rare, and the Halo franchise from Xbox Game Studios to Activision.

== Games ==
- List of Activision video games
- List of Blizzard Entertainment games

== Corporate structure ==
Activision Blizzard

Activision

- Activision Shanghai Studio – Call of Duty series support studio
- Beenox – Spider-Man: Shattered Dimensions, Crash Team Racing Nitro-Fueled, Call of Duty series support studio
- Demonware – Call of Duty series support studio
- Digital Legends Entertainment – Call of Duty series support studio
- Elsewhere Entertainment – New AAA IP
- High Moon Studios – Darkwatch, Transformers: War for Cybertron, Transformers: Fall of Cybertron, Deadpool, Call of Duty series support studio
- Infinity Ward – Call of Duty series main developer, Modern Warfare sub-series
- Rare – Battletoads series, Killer Instinct series, Banjo-Kazooie series, Conker series, Perfect Dark series, Viva Piñata series, Sea of Thieves
- Raven Software – Heretic/Hexen series, Soldier of Fortune series, Singularity, Call of Duty: Warzone, Call of Duty series support studio
- Sledgehammer Games – Call of Duty series main developer
- Solid State Studios – Call of Duty series mobile studio
- Treyarch – Call of Duty series main developer, Black Ops sub-series
- World's Edge – Age of Empires series

Blizzard Entertainment

- Blizzard Albany – Several games in the Crash Bandicoot series, several games in the Tony Hawk's series, several games in the Skylanders series, Blizzard Entertainment support studio
- Blizzard Boston – Spellbreak, Blizzard Entertainment support studio
- Blizzard Entertainment – Publishing label and main development team of the Warcraft series, StarCraft series, Diablo series, and Overwatch series. Developed and maintains Battle.net

Activision Blizzard is divided into two key business segments:

- Activision, which handles the development, production, and distribution of video games from its subsidiary studios. It also houses the Call of Duty League.
- Blizzard Entertainment, which handles the development, production, and distribution of Blizzard's games. It also maintains Battle.net, organizes BlizzCon, and houses the Overwatch League.

Former properties:

- King, which handles the development and distribution of its mobile games.

== Esports initiatives ==
Activision Blizzard owns the Call of Duty and StarCraft franchises, both of which have been popular as esports. On October 21, 2015, Activision Blizzard announced the upcoming establishment of a new esports division. Named Activision Blizzard Media Networks, the division is led by sports executive Steve Bornstein and Major League Gaming (MLG) co-founder Mike Sepso, with assets from the acquisition of the now defunct IGN Pro League. Bornstein was appointed the new division's chairman. On December 31, 2015, it was reported that "substantially all" of Major League Gaming's assets would be acquired by Activision Blizzard. The New York Times reported that the acquisition was intended to bolster Activision Blizzard's push into esports, as well as its plan to develop an esports cable channel. Reports indicated that MLG would be shuttered and that the majority of the purchase price would go towards paying off the company's debt. Activision Blizzard acquired MLG on January 4, 2016 for $46 million.

In November 2016, Blizzard Entertainment, a subsidiary of Activision Blizzard, announced the launch of Overwatch League, a professional video gaming league. The league's first season began during the second half of 2017 with 12 teams. The league's structure is based on traditional sports structures, including recruiting traditional sports executives as team owners, such as Robert Kraft, owner of the New England Patriots, and Jeff Wilpon, COO of the New York Mets.

The inaugural Overwatch Grand Finals was played at the Barclays Center in Brooklyn in July 2018 and attracted 10.8 million viewers worldwide. The league hopes to have 18 teams competing during the second season in 2019, with the ultimate goal of 28 teams across the world.

In 2018, Activision Blizzard signed a multi-year deal with The Walt Disney Company to stream Overwatch League games on both ESPN and Disney XD cable channels. The company also secured an exclusive multi-year deal with Google to stream all subsequent Activision Blizzard esports events, including Call of Duty and Overwatch events, through YouTube, and to use Google's cloud services for its game hosting infrastructure; this came after a prior two-year deal with Twitch for the Overwatch League had concluded. The deal with YouTube was estimated to be valued at US$160 million, double what it had with Twitch.

Due to declining viewerships and profits during the COVID-19 pandemic, Activision eventually shuttered Major League Gaming by January 15, 2024.

== Call of Duty Endowment ==
Since 2009, when Kotick launched Call of Duty Endowment (CODE), over 50,000 veterans have been placed in high-quality jobs. In 2013 CODE started the "Seal of Distinction" program, which recognizes non-profit organizations that are successful in placing veterans in good jobs. Winners receive a $30,000 grant to use in their veteran job placement activities. The goal of CODE is to help 100,000 US and UK veterans find high-quality jobs by 2024. The endowment helps soldiers transition to civilian careers after their military service by funding nonprofit organizations and raising awareness of the value veterans bring to the workplace.

== Other legal disputes ==
=== Worlds, Inc. ===
Worlds, Inc. was issued several United States patents around 2009 related to "System and method for enabling users to interact in a virtual space", which generally described a method of server/client communications for multiplayer video games, where players would communicate through avatars. In early 2009, Worlds, Inc. stated its intent to challenge publishers and developers of MMOs, naming Activision as one of its intended targets. Worlds, Inc. had already challenged NCSoft for its MMOs in 2008. The companies ultimately settled out of court by 2010.

Worlds, Inc. launched its formal lawsuit against Activision Blizzard, including both Blizzard Entertainment and Activision Publishing, in March 2012, stating that Call of Duty and World of Warcraft infringed on its patents. Activision Publishing filed a separate patent infringement lawsuit in October 2013, asserting that Worlds, Inc. was using two Activision-owned patents in its Worlds Player software, but this suit was dismissed with prejudice by June 2014.

In Worlds, Inc. case against Activision, the judge issued a summary judgement in Activision's favor, as it had demonstrated that Worlds, Inc. had demonstrated the technologies of its patents in its client programs AlphaWorld and World Chat, released before the 1995 priority date, though this was related to filing irregularities that were subsequently corrected by the Patent Office. Activision did not challenge the updated patents through an inter partes review (IPR), and subsequently after a statutory one-year waiting period, Worlds, Inc. filed a subsequently lawsuit against Activision, asserting Call of Duty: Ghosts violated its resolved patents. Later, Worlds, Inc. stated the intent to add Bungie to the lawsuit contending that Destiny also fell afoul of its patents. Bungie subsequently filed three IPRs with the Patent Office for each of the three Worlds, Inc. patents at the core of the lawsuit. While Bungie initially won its IPR ruling at the USPTO, on appeal in September 2018, Worlds, Inc. won a ruling questioning whether Bungie had legal standing to file its IPRs.

The new Worlds, Inc. case against Activision Blizzard was heard on October 3, 2014. With Bungie's IPRs pending at the Patent Office, the judge put the trial on hold pending the outcome of the IPRs. Worlds, Inc. challenged the IPRs at the Patent Office, as they did not include Activision as an interested party, a requirement that would have been necessary given the publisher/developer relationship between Activision and Bungie. The Patent Office did not accept this argument, and subsequently agreed with the Bungie IPRs that portions of Worlds, Inc. patents were invalid. Worlds, Inc. appealed to the Federal Circuit Appeals Court, challenging the validity of the IPRs due to the lack of Activision's involvement. The Federal Circuit court ruled in favor of Worlds, Inc. in September 2018, invalidating the Patent Office's decision. Worlds, Inc.'s case presently remains at the Patent Office stage, which is re-reviewing the IPRs in consideration of the Federal Circuit's ruling. The lawsuit was dismissed in 2021, when a US district court ruled that "Worlds' patents were abstract ideas that were not sufficiently transformative to be legally patentable."

=== Infinity Ward ===
In early 2010, Activision fired Vince Zampella and Jason West, two of the founders of its studio Infinity Ward, on the basis of "breaches of contract and insubordination"; the move caused several other Infinity Ward staff to resign. Zampella and West created a new studio, Respawn Entertainment, with help from Electronic Arts' partner program, hiring the majority of those that departed Infinity Ward in their wake.

Zampella and West filed a lawsuit in April 2010 against Activision, claiming unpaid royalties on the studio's Call of Duty: Modern Warfare 2. Activision filed a countersuit against the two, accusing the pair of being "self-serving schemers". Activision later sought to add Electronic Arts to its suit, discovering that Zampella and West had been in discussions with them while still working for Activision, and further added claims against Zampella and West that the two had not returned all material related to Call of Duty while they were working at Respawn. A separate lawsuit was filed against Activision in April 2010 by several current and former members of Infinity Ward on the same basis of lack of unpaid royalties.

All parties came to an undisclosed settlement to end all suits by May 2012. Electronic Arts and Activision had settled separately on Activision's charges of poaching employees, while the suits between Activision, Zampella, West, and the Infinity Ward employee group were settled by the end of May 2012. All settlements were made for undisclosed amounts.

=== Uvalde school shooting lawsuit ===
In May 2024, families affected by the 2022 Uvalde school shooting filed a lawsuit against Activision Blizzard, alongside Meta and the gun manufacturer Daniel Defense. The suit against Activision Blizzard alleged that it promoted specific brands of guns to teens through Call of Duty. Activision Blizzard defended its position that the Call of Duty games are protected by the First Amendment and sought to have the compliant dismissed under anti-SLAPP (Strategic lawsuit against public participation) protections from such lawsuits. The lawsuit was dismissed in Feb 2026. The families submitted an appeal to the ruling.

== See also ==
- Lists of video game companies
- List of video game publishers
