= Dancing Up a Storm =

Studio album by The Raes
- Released: March 1979
- Recorded: 1978–1979
- Genres: Disco, Pop
- Length: 38:30
- Label: A&M Records
- Producer: Harry Hinde

The Raes chronology
The Raes (1978)	Dancing Up a Storm (1979)	Two Hearts (1980)

Professional ratings
Review scores
Source	Rating
Christgau's Record Guide	C+

Dancing Up a Storm is the second studio album by Welsh-Canadian husband-and-wife duo, The Raes. It was released on A&M Records in March 1979 and featured the hit singles, "A Little Lovin' (Keeps the Doctor Away)" and "I Only Wanna Get Up and Dance". The album peaked at number 161 on Billboard magazine's Top 200 chart.

== Track listing ==
No.	Title	Length
1.	"A Little Lovin' (Keeps the Doctor Away)" (Dino Fekaris, Freddie Perren)	7:09
2.	"I Only Wanna Get Up and Dance" (Pete Bellotte, Sylvester Levay)	7:25
3.	"Gonna Burn My Boogie Shoes" (Charlie Black, Jerry Gillespie, Rory Bourke)	2:51
4.	"Honest I Do" (B.J. Verdi, Christine Perren, Freddie Perren)	3:25
5.	"Don't Turn Around" (Bruce Woolley, Rodney Thompson)	5:26
6.	"Don't Make Waves" (Eric Matthew, Sally Jean)	5:15
7.	"School" (Roger Hodgson, Richard Davies)	6:59

== Studio ==
- Mixed At – Mom & Pop's Company Store, Studio City, California
- Mixed At – Sigma Sound Studios, New York City
- Recorded At – Manta Sound, Toronto, Canada

== Personnel ==
- Arranger – David Van De Pitte
- Backing Vocals – Cindy & Roy, Clay Hunt, David Lasley, Donna McElroy, Helen Curry, Hilda Harris, Karen Dempsey, Lani Groves, Patricia Henderson, Suzi Lane, Vicki Hampton
- Producer – Harry Hinde
- Master – José Rodriguez
- Mixers – Michael Hutchinson, John Luongo
- Bass – Bob Babbitt
- Drums – Charles Collins
- Guitar – Bruce Nazarian, Paul Sabu
- Keyboards – Carlton Kent
- Percussion – Jim Maelen, Paulinho da Costa
- Saxophone – George E. Palisky, Jr.
- Synthesizer – George Small
