= Activision Blizzard worker organization =

Organized workers of Activision Blizzard

ABK Workers Alliance (ABK standing for "Activision-Blizzard-King") is a group of organized workers from video game company Activision Blizzard. Formed in response to a July 2021 state lawsuit against the company for harassment and discriminatory work practices, the worker advocacy group A Better ABK organized walkouts and demonstrations against the company's policy and practices. The quality assurance workers of subsidiary Raven Software went on strike in December after part of the team was fired. The striking workers announced their union as the Game Workers Alliance in late January 2022 and offered to end the strike pending their union's recognition.

== Background ==
California's Department of Fair Employment and Housing sued Activision Blizzard in July 2021 with claims of having fostered a toxic "frat boy" work culture in which women were routinely subject to harassment and discrimination. The company's dismissive response upset employees, who sought to see the company's workplace issues addressed. Activision Blizzard, worth $65 billion, employs about 10,000 people. A Better ABK, a worker advocacy group, formed in response to the allegations to push for company change.

== History ==
A Better ABK organized two walkouts at Activision Blizzard in 2021 in response to the sexual harassment case against the company. In July, the group organized a "Walkout for Equality" for specific internal policy changes on topics including arbitration, diversity, and recruitment. Another walkout in November followed a report in The Wall Street Journal that CEO Bobby Kotick had known and not acted on harassment and abuse claims. Over 100 employees demonstrated outside Blizzard's headquarters and 1,700 workers signed a petition for Kotick's resignation.

During the same period, the ABK Workers Alliance took several public actions. The group listed four demands: ending forced arbitration, more inclusive hiring protocol, increased compensation policy transparency, and an audit of the company's internal policies by a neutral third party. The Alliance objected to Kotick's choice of legal counsel to audit the company's workplace and in September, filed an unfair labor practice suit with the National Labor Relations Board for what the group described as intimidation and coersion to prevent their discussion of wage disparity and forced arbitration policy. As part of a series of changes announced in response to the sexual harassment lawsuit, the company agreed to waive forced arbitration in cases about sexual harassment and discrimination. Their demand met, the alliance celebrated. In the time after The Wall Street Journal report on the CEO, one of the Alliance's main organizers, senior test analyst Jessica Gonzalez, left the company for personal reasons.

In early December 2021, a subsidiary of Activision Blizzard based in Wisconsin that supports the Call of Duty series, Raven Software, fired 12 quality assurance workers—about a third of the team. The employees had just completed a five-week, end-of-year "crunch" overtime period and the team had been promised pay restructuring for higher salaries. The team and other workers walked out in response. Later in the week, a group, as the ABK Workers Alliance, formally announced that the multi-day walkout had become an open-ended strike action, and they were both raising funds for a strike fund and beginning a union drive. Ultimately, 20 quality assurance workers and 60 other staff participated in the strike, from Raven's 300 total. Since the group was not unionized, the strike did not have union protections. Forgoing salaries during the work stoppage, the group's strike fund sought to offset the workers' lost wages. The fund surpassed $350,000 by early January 2022. The Communication Workers of America aided the organizing workers, who began signing union cards.

The quality assurance workers announced their intent to unionize with the Communication Workers of America's Campaign to Organize Digital Employees as the Game Workers Alliance in late January 2022. They offered to end the strike, contingent upon the company recognizing the union. The Alliance wants more realistic development timelines, less crunch time, more transparency from management, more career development opportunities, and more empowerment of underrepresented voices. Activision Blizzard denied their request to voluntarily recognize the union.

During the ABK Workers Alliance's organizing efforts, Microsoft announced that it would be acquiring the company for US$70 billion. The organized workers said that their goals of workplace improvements and securing employee rights remained unchanged.

As Activision Blizzard sought to settle its sexual harassment lawsuit with the Equal Employment Opportunity Commission, the CWA objected on behalf of an employee affected by harassment and retaliation, seeking a fairness hearing.

== Unionization ==
In May 2022, Quality Assurance (QA) testers of Activision Blizzard subsidiary Raven Software went public as "Game Workers Alliance" (GWA) with the support of Campaign to Organize Digital Employees-CWA. GWA voted to unionize (19–2), which the National Labor Relations Board certified afterwards.

Following the Raven QA team's successful unionization, the 20-member QA team of Blizzard Albany announced a unionization drive in July 2022 as GWA Albany. The vote passed (14–0), forming the second union at an Activision Blizzard subsidiary.

On March 8, 2024, 600 QA testers at 3 Activision studios in Austin, Texas, Eden Prairie, Minnesota and El Segundo, California formed the union "Activision Quality Assurance United-CWA" and voted to unionize (390–8) in favor, making it the largest video game union in the United States.

In June 2024, an unfair labor practice was filed against Lionbridge by CWA alleging that the company illegally terminated the employment of 160 Activision software testers in Boise, Idaho, in retaliation for exercising their right to participate in concerted union activities. As part of the layoff, CWA also alleges that workers were required to sign an overly broad confidentiality agreement and an illegal waiver of certain rights protected by the National Labor Relations Act.

A month later, 500 artists, designers, engineers, producers, and quality assurance testers who work on World of Warcraft voted to unionize. This is the second "wall to wall" union (following Bethesda Game Studios) to represents all employees in a Microsoft bargaining unit, regardless of their job title. The same day, 60 QA testers at Blizzard's Austin office, who work on various games including Diablo 4 and Hearthstone, also voted to unionize and formed the union "Texas Blizzard QA United-CWA".

On March 27, 2025, user-researchers launched "Activision User Research Union-CWA" the first union for UX workers. In May 2025, developers who work on the Overwatch franchise launched "Overwatch Gamemakers Guild-CWA" after a super-majority of developers signed union authorization cards. In August 2025, the team of developers working on the Diablo franchise also unionized with CWA. In October 2025, more than 100 developers who work on the games Hearthstone and Warcraft Rumble unionized with CWA, approximately a week after 400 workers across Blizzard's platform and technology department also voted to unionize with CWA.

== See also ==
- Unionization in the tech sector
- Game Workers Unite
