= Koos (name) =

Koos is a Dutch and Afrikaans short form (hypocorism) of the given name Jacobus and a surname. People with this name include:

== Given name ==
- Koos Andriessen (1928–2019), Dutch government minister
- Koos Bekker (born 1952), South African chief executive and billionaire
- Koos Bisschoff (born 1938), South African military officer
- Jacobus Boomsma (born 1951), Dutch evolutionary biologist
- Koos de la Rey (1847–1914), South African general during the Second Boer War
- Koos du Plessis (1945–1984), South African singer-songwriter and poet
- Koos van Ellinckhuijzen (1942–2016), Namibian visual artist
- Koos Formsma (born 1957), Dutch businessman and football chairman
- Koos Hertogs (1949–2015), Dutch serial killer
- Koos Issard (born 1971), Dutch water polo player
- Koos de Jong (1912–1993), Dutch sports sailor
- Koos Kombuis (born 1954), South African musician, singer, songwriter and writer
- Koos Köhler (1905–1965), Dutch water polo player
- J. J. van der Leeuw (1893–1934), Dutch theosophist and author
- Koos Louw (born 1952), South African Navy officer
- Koos Maasdijk (born 1968), Dutch rower
- Koos Moerenhout (born 1973), Dutch road bicycle racer
- Koos Postema (born 1932), Dutch journalist and television presenter
- Koos Ras (1928–1997), South African singer and comedian
- Koos Rietkerk (1927–1986), Dutch politician
- Koos Strauss (1900–1990), South African Unity Party politician
- Koos Van Den Akker (1939–2015), Dutch-born American fashion designer
- Koos van der Merwe (born 1937), South African politician
- Koos Verdam (1915–1998), Dutch government minister and Queen's Commissioner
- Jacobus "Koos" Verhoeff (1927–2018), Dutch mathematician, computer scientist, and artist
- Koos Vorrink (1891–1955), Dutch socialist leader
- Koos Waslander (born 1957), Dutch footballer
- Koos van Zomeren (born 1946), Dutch author

== Surname ==
- Gábor Koós (born 1986), Hungarian footballer
- János Koós (1937–2019), Hungarian pop singer born János Kupsa
- Torin Koos (born 1980), American cross country skier
