= The Raes (TV program) =

Canadian variety television program

- Also known as: The Raes Variety Hour
- Genre: Variety show
- Directed by: Michael Watt
- Starring: Robbie Rae; Cherrill Rae
- Theme music composer: Tommy Banks
- Country of origin: Canada
- Original language: English
- No. of seasons: 2
- No. of episodes: 26

Production
- Producer: Ken Gibson
- Production locations: CBC-TV Studios; Vancouver
- Running time: 30–60 minutes

Original release
- Network: CBC Television
- Release: 30 June 1978 – 1 April 1980

The Raes is a Canadian variety show that aired on CBC Television from 30 June 1978 to 1 April 1980.

== Premise ==
Robbie and Cherrill Rae, a husband-and-wife singing duo, hosted this entertainment program featuring the Tommy Banks orchestra, Jeff Hyslop's choreography and the James Hibbard Dancers. The program featured international musical guests combined with Canadian musicians and also included comedy segments starring Lally Cadeau as a wardrobe director and Jackson Davies portraying a television director. It was recorded with a studio audience at CBC-TV Studios in Vancouver, British Columbia.

== Scheduling ==
The show's initial run was an hour-long mid-season program titled The Raes Variety Hour on Fridays at 9:00 p.m. from 30 June to 25 August 1978. The following year, it ran for a regular season as half-hour episodes under the shortened title The Raes on Tuesdays at 8:30 p.m. from 11 September 1979 to 1 April 1980.

== Episode list ==
=== Season 1 – The Raes Variety Hour (1978) ===
Ep #	Airdate	Director	Guest Stars(s)
1	30 June 1978	Michael Watt	Patsy Gallant, The Keane Brothers, Morey Amsterdam, Shari Lewis
2	7 July 1978	Michael Watt	Tommy Common, Peter Pringle, Morey Amsterdam
3	14 July 1978	Michael Watt	Donna & LeRoy Anderson, Shari Lewis, Morey Amsterdam
4	21 July 1978	Michael Watt	Morey Amsterdam, Ray Griff, Myrna Lorrie, Susan Jacks, Larry Evoy
5	28 July 1978	Michael Watt	Patti Page, Ian Tyson, Shari Lewis
6	18 August 1978	Michael Watt	Morris Albert, Denise McCann, Carroll Baker
7	25 August 1978	Michael Watt	Peter Chipman, Ray Price, Morey Amsterdam, Shari Lewis

=== Season 2 – The Raes (1979–1980) ===
Ep #	Airdate	Director	Guest Stars(s)
1	11 September 1979	Michael Watt	ABBA
2	18 September 1979	Michael Watt	Max Webster, Shari Lewis
3	25 September 1979	Michael Watt	The Babys, Arlene Duncan
4	2 October 1979	Michael Watt	Nick Gilder, Alma Faye
5	23 October 1979	Michael Watt	Prism, Frank Mills
6	30 October 1979	Michael Watt	Stonebolt, Grace Jones
7	6 November 1979	Michael Watt	Trooper, Christopher Ward
8	13 November 1979	Michael Watt	Shari Lewis, Martin Stevens
9	20 November 1979	Michael Watt	Maxine Nightingale
10	27 November 1979	Michael Watt	Robert John, Touche
11	4 December 1979	Michael Watt	France Joli, Bram Tchaikovsky
12	18 December 1979	Michael Watt	Sylvester, Max Webster
13	25 December 1979	Michael Watt	Shari Lewis & Lamb Chop
14	1 January 1980	Michael Watt	Rex Smith, Peter Allen
15	15 January 1980	Michael Watt	Shari Lewis & Lamb Chop, Doucette
16	22 January 1980	Michael Watt	Chubby Checker, Stonebolt
17	29 January 1980	Michael Watt	Pat Benatar, Howie Mandel
18	12 February 1980	Michael Watt	Shari Lewis, Prism
19	26 February 1980	Michael Watt	Patsy Gallant, Nick Gilder
