= Marthinus Nikolaas Ras =

South African military personnel

Marthinus Ras next to the Martienie Cannon.

Marthinus Nikolaas Ras (18 January 1843 – 21 February 1900) was a South African farmer, soldier, and gun-maker who is considered the father of South African Artillery.

== Military service ==
He served in the First Boer War in the Potchefstroom commando under General Piet Cronjé. After witnessing the siege on the British fort at Potchefstroom by the Boers, he realized the need for artillery by the Boer forces to be able to successfully mount an assault the British blockhouses and forts. In the early stages of the conflict, the Boers seriously lacked cannons to enable them to assault the six British army forts in the Transvaal. In December 1880, he requested and obtained permission to return home to his farm Bokfontein, near Brits, to build a cannon for the Boer forces.

== Cannon building ==
Ras built two cannons (named the Ras cannons), the first being a 3 inch caliber, 4½ feet barrel cannon, named "Martienie" and the second a 2 inch caliber, 5½ barrel cannon, named "Ras". The "Martienie" cannon was used to great effect on a British fort near Rustenburg, firing 93 shots and resulting in the subsequent surrender of the fort.

== Death ==
On 21 February 1900, during the Second Boer War, whilst on the way back to his farm at Bokfontein (south of Brits), Ras was ambushed and killed at Kayaseput by an impi (African war party) of the Kgatla tribal chief Linchwe, an African tribe fighting on the side of the British.

== Sources ==
- L.S. Bothma; C.M. Woest; L. Groesbeek (2005). Ras-Geslagsregister. L.S. Botma & C.M. Woest. ISBN 0-620-32329-9.
