= Lists of video game companies =

The following lists of video game companies are available:

- List of video game developers
- List of video game publishers
- List of indie game developers
- List of largest video game companies by revenue
