= The Raes =

British-Canadian husband-and-wife singing duo

The Raes were the British-Canadian husband-and-wife singing duo of Robbie Rae (born Robert Henry Bevan, May 17, 1954 – February 9, 2006) and Cherrill Rae (born Yates), who had a handful of disco-inflected pop hits in the late 1970s.

== Robbie Rae ==
Robbie Rae grew up in Wales and began his recording career as a pre-teen, though his version of "The Lord's Prayer", sung in Welsh, was banned by the BBC, who considered it blasphemous. Before long, he was touring Europe and had his own television variety show in Wales.

== Cherrill Rae ==
Cherrill Rae was born in England but lived in the Canadian province of Ontario as a child and developed an appreciation for R&B, especially the Motown sound, while living there; following this experience, she moved back to the United Kingdom to continue her musical studies and pursue a singing career.

== The Raes ==
Robbie and Cherrill met in England when Cherrill was performing on Robbie's television show, and were engaged soon afterward. Since their solo careers in the UK kept them apart for too long, Robbie and Cherrill moved to Canada, where they began to perform and record, first as Cherrill and Robbie Rae and then as a duo called the Raes. They scored their first hit in Canada in July 1977 with a disco-styled remake of Doris Day's "Que Sera Sera" and followed it up with their self-titled debut album, The Raes, the following year. The duo were nominated for two Juno Awards and hosted their own network variety show called The Raes on CBC for two seasons (1978–80).

In a 1979 interview, the Raes maintained that they did not think of themselves as a disco group necessarily, but a group that recorded pop songs with a disco feel. They also maintained that they had no interest in the synthesizer-based "Euro-disco" sound (a la Donna Summer's "I Feel Love"): "We want to sound man-made," Cherrill said. "The disco sound should keep coming from people, not machines."

Their second album, Dancing Up a Storm, was released in 1979. Picked up for U.S. release by A&M Records, it included their best-known song, "A Little Lovin' (Keeps the Doctor Away)", which became a top-five hit on the Billboard Dance Club chart. After the record was added by influential radio stations on the East Coast such as WKTU in New York and WRKO in Boston, it entered the Billboard Hot 100 chart and went on to peak at No. 61.

Robbie and Cherrill toured the U.S. to promote their album and made appearances on American television shows such as Soul Train and American Bandstand but were unable to find lasting success in the American market. The follow-up single to "A Little Lovin' (Keeps the Doctor Away)" called "I Only Wanna Get Up and Dance" was another Canadian hit but petered out at No. 47 on the Dance chart in the US. Robbie and Cherrill released one more album in Canada, Two Hearts (not released in the US), in 1980 before the marriage and the act split up.

== Post-divorce ==
Robbie and Cherrill pursued separate careers after their divorce in 1982. Robbie recorded for Quality Records for a time and was a member of GNP (Gilmour-Negus Project), along with Jim Gilmour (guitar) and Steve Negus (drums), who had both left Saga at the time, though they would later rejoin that group. GNP recorded one album for Virgin Records, Safety Zone, released in 1989, along with the single "How Many Times". In the 1990s, he went on to perform the club circuit in Toronto. In 1996, Robbie and his wife Martine Bergeron moved to Dubai, United Arab Emirates, where Robbie performed for American troops as well as in a nightclub called The Cyclone. In 1999, they moved to Thailand (Kamala Beach, Phuket) where they ran a tourist pub. In 2001, after being married 12 years, he and Martine divorced. On December 26, 2004, Robbie went missing as one of many victims of the Indian Ocean tsunami disaster when Phuket was devastated by flooding; he was found safe a short time later. Robbie died on February 9, 2006, in Phuket, Thailand, following a short illness. Robbie left behind a son, Christopher Robert Bevan from his second marriage with Pamela Simmons. Christopher currently resides in Brantford, Ontario.

Cherrill remarried another musician, Nick Cucunato, and has revitalized her career by performing in several acts, including Backstreet, Rae and Rockit, the Cherrill Rae Trio lounge act, as well as a fly-on act with Carnival Cruise Lines. Today, she continues to perform her nightclub act on occasion and resides in Florida.

== Discography ==
=== Albums ===
Year	Title	Label
1978	The Raes	A&M Records
1979	Dancing Up a Storm	A&M Records
1980	Two Hearts	A&M Records

=== Singles ===
Year	Title	Notes
1976	"Don't Shut Me Out"	
1976	"Oh Me, Oh My"	
1977	"Que Sera Sera"	Canada (CHUM) #15, (RPM) Top Singles #9
1977	"All Kinds of People"	
1977	"Cara Mia"	Canada (RPM) Top Singles #87
1978	"A Little Lovin' (Keeps the Doctor Away)"	Canada (CHUM) #11, (RPM) Top Singles #13, US (Hot 100) #61; US (Disco) #5
1979	"I Only Wanna Get Up and Dance"	Canada (RPM) Top Singles #12, Adult Contemporary #19, (CHUM) #13, US (Disco) #47
1979	"Don't Turn Around"	Canada (RPM) Top Singles #55
1980	"Two Hearts"	

== Filmography ==
Year	Title	Notes
1978–80	The Raes	CBC Television series
