= Koos Ras =

- Born: August 4, 1928
- Died: January 1, 1997 (aged 69)
- Citizenship: South Africa
- Occupation: Singer

Koos Ras (Jacobus Adriaan Gerhardus) was born on 4 August 1928, on a farm named Paardekop in Northern Natal Province in South Africa. As a young boy he often visited his father's neighbour (name unknown), who taught him how to play a "Konsertina".

Ras was famously known as a comedian, singer, composer, writer and businessman. He recorded 14 LP records including Spoke ("Ghosts"), Lekker ou braaivleis aand ("Pleasant barbecue evening"). Although most of his music was in Afrikaans, he also recorded a few songs in English. During the 1960s he recorded a classic waltz, "Tiny Bubbles," as a duet with (name unknown), which hit #1 on the Springbok Hit Parade.

In 1971, he opened his business "Kempton Orrel en Klavier Sentrum" (Kempton Organ and Piano Centre). Ras and his wife Bea supplied music instruments and music tuition books to schools, churches and private individuals.

Koos died on 17 April 1997. The music centre closed in 2001.
