= Koos Van Den Akker =

Dutch-American fashion designer

Koos
- Born: Koos van den Akker; 3 March 1939
- Died: 3 February 2015 (aged 75)
- Occupation: Fashion designer
- Label: KOOS

Koos van den Akker (March 16, 1939 – February 3, 2015) was a Dutch-born fashion designer who lived and worked in New York City. During his 50+ year long career, Van den Akker was recognized for his Koos fashion label (1969–2015) which featured garments adorned with Koos' collage work and cuts.

== Early life and education ==
Born Koos van den Akker in The Hague, the Netherlands, Koos taught himself to sew using a sewing machine and his first creation was a dress made from a white bedsheet for his sister. Van den Akker attended the Royal Academy of Art where he studied fashion and made window displays for a department store until he was 18. Koos then spent two years in the Dutch army making clothes for the officers' wives and daughters.

== Fashion career ==
Koos moved to Paris and studied at ESMOD (Ecole Supérieure des Arts et techniques de la Mode) which was located in the same building as the Christian Dior workrooms. In 1963, Christian Dior selected Koos for an apprenticeship. After three years at Dior, Koos moved back to the Netherlands and started his own business, opening up his first store in The Hague where he slept in a small room in the back. The window displays were influenced by American movies such as Carousel and movie stars such as Audrey Hepburn dressed by Hubert de Givenchy. After his father's death in 1968, Koos closed his stores and moved to New York City.

=== KOOS label ===
In 1971, Koos opened his first boutique in Manhattan. In the mid seventies, Van den Akker had a wholesale line with a showroom where major upscale stores, such as Bonwit Teller, Saks Fifth Avenue, Marshall Field's, Bloomingdale's and Frost Bros., bought their supplies of Koos'.

Until his death, Koos had a store at 1263 Madison Avenue, New York and a studio in the Garment District. Koos maintained a high profile in New York and LA where entertainers such as Julie & Harry Belafonte, Cher, Elizabeth Taylor, Diahann Carroll and Barbara Walters were clients. After the success of the Bill Cosby Sweaters, more celebrities donned Koos garments, such as Stevie Wonder, Chita Rivera, Brooke Shields, Isabella Rossellini, Glenn Close, Lauren Hutton and NBA stars Isaiah Thomas and Magic Johnson.

Koos was a member of the Council of Fashion Designers of America (CFDA).

=== Awards ===
In 2002, Van den Akker was awarded an honorary doctorate from the San Francisco Academy of Art College as a Doctor of Humane Letters. In the summer of 2008, he became an artist in residence and gave a masterclass for the Academy of Art University in San Francisco. In April 2009, he gave a masterclass for Vogue Patterns in Canada.

=== Exhibition history ===
In 2014, he was one of fourteen designers chosen to be in the exhibition "Folk Couture: Fashion and Folk Art" at the American Folk Art Museum.

=== QVC ===
In 1998, Koos started a label for television retailer QVC called 'Koos of Course!' and presented his own show with the collection selling out in 30 minutes. The line continued on QVC until his final show in February 2006.

=== The Bill Cosby Sweaters ===
Josephine Premice, a singer in the 1980s and a good friend of Koos's, asked him to make a sweater as present for Bill Cosby. She took it to the set of The Cosby Show where Bill immediately put it on and wore it for the taping. Cosby then began giving his friends presents made by Koos; when he invited friends to New York for a weekend celebrating his wife Camille's birthday, Cosby asked Koos to open the store on a Sunday exclusively for his guests, and told them to choose something they liked.

Bill Cosby would regularly wear Van den Akker's collaged sweaters on television, further promoting the designer's reputation. After Cosby was seen sporting Koos' vibrant sweaters, celebrities such as Erik Estrada, Chuck Norris and Richard Simmons donned them.

== Inspired designers ==
Koos' innovations in fashion have inspired a spectrum of designers from Geoffrey Beene to the Balenciaga by Nicolas Ghesquière Spring '02 Line, to the Marc Jacobs Fall '06 Line. Koos has inspired and worked with illustrator/designer Christopher Holloran.

=== Koos on Koos ===
In his own words Koos said: "I think of myself as very basic. I am a craftsperson and I sew like that. I sew beautiful clothes. I am nothing more than a worker sitting behind a sewing machine. That's where I feel most comfortable, that's where I am the best. That's what I do best and it's very basic."

== Death ==
In 1991, Koos' life-partner John Bell died.

Van den Akker died on February 3, 2015, at the age of 75.
