= Tiny =

Tiny may refer to:

== Automobiles ==
- Tara Tiny, an Indian electric car
- Tiny (car), a British cyclecar manufactured between 1912 and 1915

== Computing ==
- Tiny BASIC, a dialect of the computer programming language BASIC
- Tiny Encryption Algorithm, in cryptography, a block cipher notable for its simplicity of description and implementation
- Tiny Computers, a defunct UK computer manufacturer
- TinyMCE, a web-based editor
- TinyMUD, a MUD server
  - MU*, a family of MUD servers often called the Tiny family

== People ==
=== Given name ===
- Tiny Bounmalay (born 1993), Laotian footballer
- Tiny Hoekstra (born 1996), Dutch footballer
- Tiny Janssen, Dutch retired sidecarcross rider and 1990 world champion
- Tiny Ruys (born 1957), Dutch football coach
- Tieng Tiny (born 1986), Cambodian footballer

=== Nickname ===
- Nate Archibald (born 1948), American National Basketball Association player
- Tiny Bonham (1913–1949), American Major League Baseball pitcher
- Tiny Bradshaw (1905–1958), American jazz and rhythm and blues bandleader, singer, composer, and musician
- Tiny Broadwick (1893–1978), American pioneering parachutist
- Tiny Cahoon (1900–1973), American National Football League player
- Tameka Cottle, (born 1975), American singer-songwriter and former member of Xscape
- Tiny Croft (1920–1977), American National Football League player
- Paul Engebretsen (1910–1979), American National Football League player
- Tiny Gooch (1903-1986), American all-around college athlete, attorney and politician
- Norman B. Gray (1902–1976), American Wyoming Supreme Court justice
- Tiny Grimes (1916–1989), American jazz and R&B guitarist
- Tiny Kahn (1923–1953), American jazz drummer, arranger and composer
- Tiny Kox (born 1953), Dutch politician
- Tiny Leys (1907–1989), New Zealand rugby union player
- Tom Lister Jr. (1958–2020), American actor and wrestler
- Big Tiny Little (1930–2010), American pianist
- Tiny Lund (1929–1975), American race car driver
- Tiny Osborne (1893–1969), American Major League Baseball pitcher
- Tiny Parham (1900–1943), Canadian-born American jazz bandleader and pianist
- Kendal Pinder (born 1956), American basketball player
- Tiny Rowland (1917–1998), British businessman and chief executive of the Lonrho conglomerate from 1962 to 1994
- Tiny Ron Taylor (1947–2019), American film actor and former basketball player
- Tiny Sandford (1894–1961), American film actor
- Tiny Thompson (1903–1981), Canadian National Hockey League goaltender
- Tiny Timbrell (1917–1992), Canadian guitarist
- Tiny Wharton (1927–2005), Scottish football referee
- Carl Whiting (born 1981), New Zealand sailor
- Xu Linyin (born 1986), Chinese beach volleyball player

== Fictional characters ==
- Tiny, in the 1987 American comedy movie Revenge of the Nerds II: Nerds in Paradise
- Tiny, a comic strip character from The Topper
- Tiny Tiger, from the Crash Bandicoot video game series
- Tiny Kong, from the Donkey Kong video game series
- Tiny, from the video game Commandos 2: Men of Courage
- Tiny - Stone Giant, from the video game Warcraft III: Reign of Chaos and derivative games, more prominent, and referential from Dota 2
- Desmond Tiny or Des Tiny, in the novel series The Saga of Darren Shan
- Tiny, a main character in the British children's television series Tots TV

== Places ==
- Tiny, Ontario, a township in Canada
- Tiny, Virginia, an unincorporated community in the US
- Tiny Glacier, Wyoming, US

== Other uses ==
- "Tiny" (Once Upon a Time), an episode of the television series Once Upon a Time
- Tiny Toon Adventures, an American animated series
- Tiny Toons Looniversity, An American animated series
- Tiny and miny, mathematical operators in combinatorial game theory

== See also ==
- Tiny Tim (disambiguation)
- Small (disambiguation)
- Little (disambiguation)
