= Crash Twinsanity =

2004 platform game

- North American PlayStation 2 cover art
- Developer: Traveller's Tales Oxford Studio
- Publisher: Vivendi Universal Games (Note: Released in PAL regions under the Sierra Entertainment brand name.)
- Directors: Paul Gardner; David Robinson
- Producers: David Robinson; Kirk Scott
- Designers: Paul Gardner; David Robinson; John McCann
- Programmers: Steve Oldacre; Andy Tate
- Artist: Dan Tonkin
- Writer: Paul Gardner
- Composer: Spiralmouth
- Series: Crash Bandicoot
- Platforms: PlayStation 2; Xbox
- Release: NA: September 28, 2004; EU: October 8, 2004; AU: October 28, 2004
- Genres: Platform, action-adventure
- Mode: Single-player

Crash Twinsanity is a 2004 platform game developed by Traveller's Tales Oxford Studio and published by Vivendi Universal Games for the PlayStation 2 and Xbox. It is the eleventh installment in the Crash Bandicoot series and the fifth game in the main series. The game's story takes place three years after the events of Crash Bandicoot: The Wrath of Cortex and follows the main protagonist and antagonist of the series, Crash Bandicoot and Doctor Neo Cortex, who must work together to stop the Evil Twins — a pair of interdimensional parrots — from destroying N. Sanity Island.

Crash Twinsanity began development as Crash Bandicoot Evolution, and was intended to have a more serious tone than previous games. The similarity of the game's premise to Ratchet & Clank convinced Traveller's Tales to restart production and create Crash Twinsanity as a comedic title in which Cortex would be teamed up with Crash as a means of exploring his character. The game marks the debut of Lex Lang as the voice of Cortex, replacing previous actor Clancy Brown. Various concepts were removed from the game during production due to time constraints, but were incorporated into the final game as unlockable extras.

Crash Twinsanity received mixed reviews upon release; while it was mostly praised for the gameplay variety, presentation, narrative, humour and Lang's voice performance, there were mixed reactions towards the music and criticism for the controls, platforming sections, and camera. Two mobile versions of the game were subsequently released and were also met with mixed reception.

== Gameplay ==
Crash Twinsanity features several styles of gameplay, one of which is named "HumiliSkate", in which Crash rides Cortex as a snowboard.

Crash Twinsanity differs from previous entries in the series through its free-roaming gameplay style; the player can explore the game's environments in all directions and travel seamlessly between levels. As opposed to the "hub room" format utilized by previous games, the player's progression through Twinsanity is influenced by the plot. Over the course of the game, the player controls three different characters: Crash Bandicoot, Doctor Neo Cortex (or both at the same time) and new character Nina Cortex; the controlled character alternates between particular levels. Crash is the primary player character and has the ability to jump into the air and land on enemy characters, spin in a tornado-like fashion to knock enemies off-screen, slide across the ground and perform a body slam to break certain objects. Cortex is armed with a raygun and a limited amount of ammo, and Nina uses her mechanical arms to punch enemies and latch onto distant ledges. When Crash and Cortex are together, Crash can use Cortex to increase the range of his spin attack, use Cortex's head as a hammer to break certain objects, and hurl Cortex across gaps to activate switches. Two levels in the game incorporate a gameplay style named "HumiliSkate", which involves Crash riding Cortex as a makeshift snowboard, while two others are played in a style named "Doc Amok", which involves Crash clearing a path for a fleeing Cortex. Another gameplay style, named "RollerBrawl", involves the player steering Crash and Cortex through the level as they engage in a brawl.

Wumpa Fruit is scattered throughout the game, and grant an extra life if 100 Fruits are collected. Crates also carry Wumpa Fruit, which can be obtained if the crates are broken. TNT crates explode after a three-second fuse when jumped on, while Nitro crates explode upon any physical contact. Crates with plungers will detonate any Nitro crates in the immediate vicinity. Checkpoint crates allow the player to return to a specific point in the stage upon losing a life, while World crates save the player's progress. Gems littered throughout the levels can be collected to unlock extra content such as concept art and storyboards.

== Plot ==
Three years after his previous defeat by Crash, (Note: As depicted in Crash Bandicoot: The Wrath of Cortex) Doctor Neo Cortex returns to the Wumpa Islands to exact revenge on Crash. Cortex incapacitates Crash's sister, Coco, and impersonates her to lure Crash into a trap. After Crash's victory against Cortex and his Mecha-Bandicoot, Cortex and Crash are both sent plummeting down a hole and land in a cave. Enraged by his defeat, Cortex attacks Crash, and the pair engage in a prolonged fight across the cave. Upon returning to the surface, Crash and Cortex encounter a pair of interdimensional parrots named the Evil Twins, who plan to destroy the Wumpa Islands and steal Cortex's brain. After Cortex pleads for Crash's help, he is spontaneously attacked by bees and finds himself captured by Papu Papu and his subordinate tribesmen after stumbling into their territory. Crash rescues Cortex from captivity and escapes a pursuing mob of tribesmen. Crash and Cortex have another encounter with the Evil Twins, who bring a deity statue to life to attack the pair. Cortex, having learned that the Evil Twins come from the Tenth Dimension, concocts a plan and summons Crash to his antarctic lair.

Crash and Cortex attempt to enter the Iceberg Lair through the front entrance, but the door is frozen shut, forcing the pair to take an alternate path inside. They inadvertently free Uka Uka in the process, who attacks them with a giant body formed from ice. Uka Uka is convinced by his twin brother Aku Aku to join forces and attack the Evil Twins themselves, but both are easily defeated. Cortex introduces the Psychetron, a device that will allow travel to the Tenth Dimension, but requires Power Crystals to function. Crash uses Cortex as an impromptu snowboard in an attempt to reach Doctor N. Gin's battleship and gather the Power Crystals, and destroys Dingodile's shack in the process. Crash's venture through the battleship eventually results in an explosion of a cache of TNT crates, which sinks the ship and propels Crash into a confrontation with Doctors Nefarious Tropy and Nitrus Brio on a distant ice floe. Crash returns to the Iceberg Lair with Cortex, where the latter is attacked by a recovered Coco, who believes that Cortex kidnapped Crash. Coco's assault sends two of the Power Crystals flying into the Psychetron, which damages the machine and paralyzes Coco in a chain reaction. Crash and Cortex set a course for Madame Amberly's Academy of Evil in the hopes of recruiting Cortex's niece Nina to assist in repairing the Psychetron.

Crash and Cortex sneak into the Academy through the sewer system, where they fend off an attack from Dingodile. After Cortex finds Nina and has an encounter with Madame Amberly, he recalls the origin of the Evil Twins; when Cortex was an 8-year-old student in the Academy, he used his two pet parrots Victor and Moritz as test subjects for a prototype of his Evolvo-Ray, but the experiment resulted in the parrots being transported to the Tenth Dimension, where they would be mutated by the environment's severe "reverso-radioactivity". The trio return to the Iceberg Lair, repair the Psychetron and travel to the Tenth Dimension to face the Evil Twins. Upon their arrival, Nina is kidnapped by an evil doppelganger of Crash and taken to his desolate home on Twinsanity Island. After cornering Evil Crash, Cortex valiantly offers himself in Nina's stead, which leads to a chase. Crash, Cortex and Nina escape Evil Crash and make their way to the Evil Twins' compound, where Cortex confronts the Evil Twins and commands them back into their cage. The Evil Twins transform their cage into a giant robot and engage in a final battle with the trio. The Evil Twins are defeated and flee the compound, only to be devoured by Evil Crash when they take refuge in his home. After the trio return to their own dimension, Cortex attempts to eliminate Crash, but the malfunctioning Psychetron teleports Cortex into Crash's mind, where he is trapped with a crowd of dancing Crash duplicates.

== Development ==
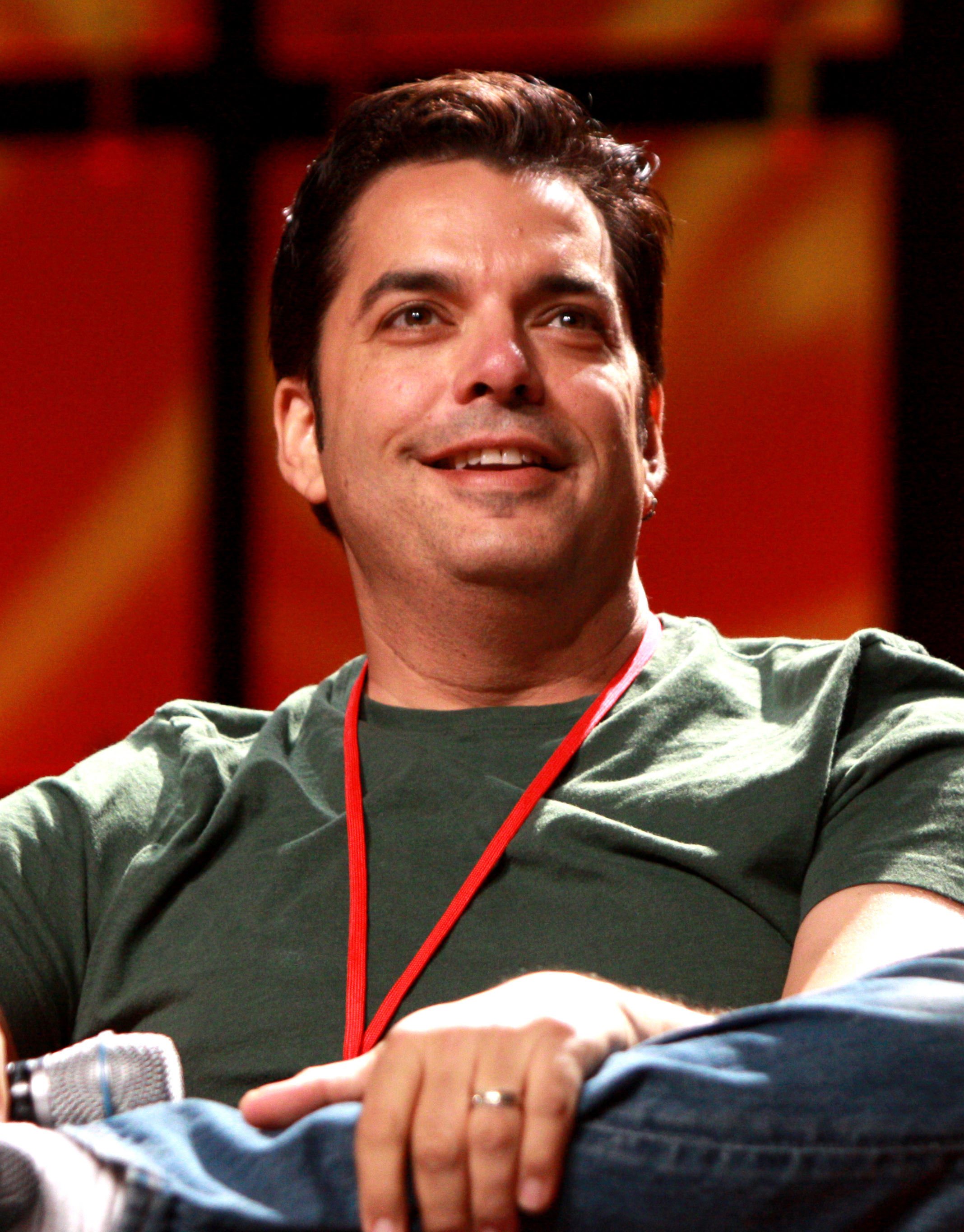
Crash Twinsanity marks the debut of Lex Lang (pictured in 2013) as the voice of series' antagonist Doctor Neo Cortex; his performance was widely acclaimed by critics.

Crash Twinsanity was developed by Traveller's Tales' Oxford division and published by Vivendi Universal Games. The game was originally titled Crash Bandicoot Evolution and featured a premise involving the Evil Twins stealing Crash's island from Earth and grafting it onto a giant planet made from pieces of others. The tone of the game was intended to be more serious than preceding entries in the series, with the term "edgy" being widely used among the development team. In response to the release of Insomniac Games' Ratchet & Clank, which featured an identical premise, Traveller's Tales abandoned Crash Bandicoot Evolution and restarted production with a focus on making the next Crash title as comedic as possible. The new game went through several working subtitles, including Unlimited, Fully Fluxed and Twinsane. Eventually, VU Games gave Traveller's Tales one hour to choose the final title before the default selection of Unlimited. Concept artist Keith Webb came up with the title Crash Twinsanity with only five minutes to spare. The game was announced as Crash Bandicoot: Unlimited on March 26, 2004, with Crash Twinsanity originally intended as the game's American title.

Lead designer Paul Gardner and artist Daniel Tonkin explained that Cortex was made playable as an opportunity to explore his character, and was teamed up with Crash because "it didn't make sense to make them two opposing characters who were playable because the player would be kind of playing against himself". Producer and creative director David Robinson cited Jay and Silent Bob and The Ren & Stimpy Show as the central influences on the game's character dynamic, as both properties provide a variation of two opposing personalities spending a large amount of time together; Ren & Stimpy crew member Jordan Reichek wrote the game's script, provided creative input on the characters and game mechanics, and illustrated the game's cover art. The character Nina Cortex was created and designed by Duke Mighten for an early version of Crash Nitro Kart, and was re-appropriated for Crash Twinsanity due to her popularity among the development team. Gardner created a rough model of Nina modified from that of Neo Cortex, and her final model was created by Chris Abedelmassieh. Nina's model was created over the course of a single weekend. Although Crash Twinsanity was intended to be Nina's debut appearance, Gardner was alerted to her early appearance in Crash Bandicoot Purple by Webb, who came across Nina's image in newly released screenshots of the game. Crunch Bandicoot was included in a cameo appearance due to his fan-favourite status. A stage taking place in Coco's mind, "Gone a Bit Coco", was removed because production was too far along to guarantee that the stage could be finished and played without crashing. Other content, such as a cameo by Fake Crash and the appearance of a good version of Cortex, was also removed, but appears in unlockable concept images in the final game. A punching maneuver by Crash that appeared in the Crash Bandicoot Unlimited demo was removed due to its inadvertent capability of destroying scenery. Rusty Walrus, a blue walrus character who pursues Crash in one level, was inspired by the final boss in The NewZealand Story.

Crash Twinsanity's voice actors were cast and directed by Chris Borders. Clancy Brown, the previous voice actor for Cortex, had left the series due to his dissatisfaction with the video game industry's financial compensation for voice actors. Lex Lang was called in for an audition to replace Brown, and was given an explanation that VU Games considered Brown's performance to be "too mean". After Borders described Cortex to Lang and had him listen to signature samples of Brown's performance, he encouraged Lang to play Cortex as more flamboyant and self-absorbed. Lang eventually created a depiction of Cortex that was "master evil with a bit of a childish feminine side that leaks out in his tirades" that had everyone laughing at the lines and the character. Monty Python's Flying Circus was an additional influence on Lang's delivery as Cortex. Other cast members include Mel Winkler, Michael Ensign, Susan Silo, Debi Derryberry, Alex Fernandez, Dwight Schultz and Quinton Flynn. The full-motion videos of Crash Twinsanity were created by Red Eye Studios, who previously created the full-motion videos for Crash Nitro Kart. The soundtrack of Crash Twinsanity was composed, performed, arranged and produced by a cappella band Spiralmouth, while Gabriel Mann recorded and mixed the soundtrack at Asylum Recording Studios in Los Angeles.

== Release ==
Crash Twinsanity was showcased alongside other VU Games titles at the Game Stars Live consumer games show held at ExCeL London from September 1–5, 2004. VU Games' booth featured a "Challenge Corner" where attendees competed for Crash and Spyro-based prizes. The game went gold on September 7, 2004, and was released in North America on September 28, 2004, in Europe on October 8, 2004, and in Australia on October 28, 2004. A version for the GameCube was announced, but it was cancelled for undisclosed reasons; IGN speculated that the port's cancellation was due to the disappointing financial performance of other VU Games titles on the system. In the United Kingdom, Crash Twinsanity debuted at #25 in the sales charts, and remained within the top 40 best-sellers by the 2004 Christmas season.

A mobile game based on Crash Twinsanity was developed by VU Games, published by I-play and released on November 6, 2004. The mobile version consists of six levels based on the "Doc Amok" stages of the console version. Another mobile game, titled Crash Twinsanity 3D, was published by Vivendi Games Mobile and Wonderphone and developed by Kuju Entertainment for an exclusive selection of 3G java-enabled handsets that accompanied the commercial launch of Vodafone live! in December 2004, including the Motorola E1000, V980 and C980, the Nokia 6630, the Sony Ericsson V800, the Sharp 802 SH and 902 SH, and the Toshiba V902T. In this version, the player controls Crash Bandicoot, who must sprint along a three-dimensional road and dodge obstacles, defeat enemies and collect items en route. In 2007, the PlayStation 2 version of Crash Twinsanity was re-released in the three-disc Crash Bandicoot Action Pack compilation alongside Crash Nitro Kart and Crash Tag Team Racing.

== Reception ==
Reception

Aggregate score
Aggregator	Score
Metacritic	Xbox: 66/100; PS2: 64/100

Review scores
Publication	Score
1Up.com	B
Eurogamer	7/10
Game Informer	6/10
GamePro	7.5/10
GameRevolution	C+
GameSpot	Xbox: 7.4/10; PS2: 7.3/10; Mobile: 7.1/10
GameZone	Xbox: 7.5/10; PS2: 6.9/10
IGN	Console: 7.7/10; Mobile: 7.3/10
Jeuxvideo.com	Xbox: 17/20; PS2: 15.9/10
Official Xbox Magazine (US)	Xbox: 7.3/10
TeamXbox	Xbox: 7.5/10

Crash Twinsanity received mixed reviews from critics upon release. The open-world setting was welcomed as an improvement over the "claustrophobic" level design of previous games, and the various gameplay styles were commended as clever and well-implemented; James B. Pringle of IGN compared the 'ingenious' Doc Amok levels to Lemmings, and Louis Bedigian of GameZone considered the RollerBrawl sequence to be the game's best. However, the platforming sections were considered formulaic and tired. The gameplay aspect of controlling Crash and Cortex in tandem drew comparisons to Jak and Daxter and Whiplash, while the RollerBrawl segment was widely compared to Super Monkey Ball. The character Nina Cortex was positively received by critics, some of whom compared her extending robotic arms to Bionic Commando. The game's camera was widely criticised as dodgy and uncooperative, and the controls were deemed sluggish. Kristan Reed of Eurogamer and GR Chimp of GameRevolution respectively derided the checkpoint/autosave system as faulty and spaced too far apart.

Most assessments of the visuals were positive. Pringle noted the "cartoon-like" feel given to the game by its crisp and vibrant colours. Chris Stead of Australian GamePro acknowledged the graphics as "quite pretty", but stated that the collision detection and frequent invisible barriers "leave a lot to be desired". Brent Soboleski of TeamXbox, Ryan Davis of GameSpot and Nick Valentino of GameZone proclaimed Twinsanity to be the best-looking Crash Bandicoot game to date; they pointed out the increased detail in Crash and Cortex's designs and their smoother and more expressive animations that telegraph their personalities, although Soboleski, Davis and GR Chimp felt the particle and lighting effects and frame rate in the PlayStation 2 version were inferior to those in the Xbox version. Soboleski and Reed observed a lack of texture and detail in the environments, and Reed and Wooldridge pointed out the short draw distance. Bedigian and a blurb in Electronic Gaming Monthly both dismissed the visuals as lacklustre. Pringle and Reed commended the full-motion videos for their polished quality, though the inability to skip them was seen as a nuisance.

The audio, particularly the music, was met with a mixed response. Pringle stated that the music was fitting, but admitted that he "wasn't a fan" of the "pop-jazz" music in the snow/ice level, which "ended up wearing on my nerves after a while". Soboleski praised the voice-acting as "well done, with the right amount of sarcasm, humour and attitude to keep players laughing", but criticised the music as "quite repetitive and pretty cliché based on what we have been hearing year after year from the series." Andrew Wooldridge of 1Up.com was amused by the game's music and said that "Sounding something like a team of Bobby McFerrin wannabes (you know, 'Don't Worry, Be Happy') the vocalists really go all out to give the game a slapstick feel". Davis commended the music as catchy and admired the unique a cappella aspect of the soundtrack, but added that while the game's stock Crash Bandicoot sound effects "fit snugly" into the sound design, "some of them are used too often and some of them just sound a little tired." While Valentino enjoyed the game's soundtrack, Bedigian lambasted it as "insanely annoying music that doesn't fit with the wacky and crazy world of Crash Bandicoot". Vincent Lopez of Official Xbox Magazine remarked that the "mixed-up" score "would find a welcome home in Pee Wee's Playhouse". Reed found the music to be "occasionally inspired" and was surprised by the quality of some of the game's tracks (citing the Uka Uka boss fight as an example), but warned that "others, however, numb the brain into mulch so don't expect undiluted quality". Andrew Reiner of Game Informer acknowledged the game's "doo-wop and choral music-influenced" score and vocal arrangements as "wildly inventive". GR Chimp described the soundtrack as a "thoroughly weird and catchy" "combination of jungle, pop and a barbershop quartet", and opined that "the quirky approach to the composition helps give the game its attitude".

The humorous dialogue and slapstick comedy were considered a highlight, and the characterization of Cortex and Lex Lang's vocal performance were singled out for praise. Reviewers appreciated the added dimension to Cortex's personality and considered the character and his dialogue to be the most entertaining and accomplished in the game. Valentino described Cortex as "nutty in the best possible way", while Reiner admitted that "turning Cortex into a cross-dressing lunatic brought about a few chuckles".

Reception to the mobile versions was also mixed. Levi Buchanan of IGN considered the I-play version to be "infinitely more enjoyable" than its console counterpart, pointing out the colourful graphics and "well-done" character art, but noting the insensitive controls and lack of audio as negative points. Avery Score of GameSpot commented positively on the "tried-and-true" gameplay, "great" graphics, "decent" value and "good" character likenesses, but criticised the lack of in-game audio, "finicky" control, lack of innovation in terms of gameplay, lack of enemy characters and the fact that Cortex seemed "mindless". Chris James of Pocket Gamer gave Crash Twinsanity 3D a score of 5 out of 10, noting the game's simple and relatively responsive controls and polished presentation, but criticising the awkward perspective, "very finicky" collision detection, lengthy character animation and long loading screens.

== Future ==
Preceding the European release of Crash Twinsanity, Daniel Tonkin stated that Traveller's Tales was "still very interested in the franchise and I think if the opportunity came up we'd be more than happy to do another game". A pitch for a new Crash Bandicoot game, tentatively titled Cortex Chaos, was developed by Traveller's Tales after Twinsanity's completion. The game's premise centered around Crash being sucked into several television programmes by an invention created by Cortex. Twinsanity was ultimately followed by the Radical Entertainment-developed titles Crash of the Titans and Crash: Mind over Mutant.

In a 2012 interview, Keith Webb noted that if his video game Go! Go! Kokopolo was successful enough for him to expand his studio, he would try to approach Activision with a bid to create Cortex Chaos with as many members of the Twinsanity development team as possible. On August 3, 2017, following the release of the Crash Bandicoot N. Sane Trilogy, Webb sent an open letter to Vicarious Visions congratulating them on the game's success. In the letter, Webb stated that if Activision ever expressed interest in developing a Twinsanity remake, he and a handful of previous developers would gladly return to work on it.
