= Crash Bandicoot: On the Run! =

2021 video game

- Developer: King
- Publisher: King
- Director: Stephen Jarrett
- Designer: Gigi Chui
- Artist: Nana Li
- Composer: Sebastian Aav
- Series: Crash Bandicoot
- Engine: Unity
- Platforms: Android, iOS
- Release: Android: MYS: April 22, 2020; WW: March 25, 2021; iOS: WW: March 23, 2021
- Genre: Endless runner
- Modes: Single-player, multiplayer

Crash Bandicoot: On the Run! was a mobile endless runner game developed and published by King. The game was soft launched in Malaysia in 2020 and released worldwide in 2021. The game showcased the Crash Bandicoot series' characters and fictional universe in the context of a runner game. Players controlled Crash or his sister Coco, running through levels and defeating enemies using weaponry crafted from collectible ingredients. Players could use cosmetic skins to gather resources and could engage in asynchronous multiplayer gameplay by competing for survival in procedurally generated levels. Several updates were installed throughout 2021, often in the form of new levels, bosses, and cosmetic skins.

King acquired a license to create a Crash Bandicoot mobile game from Activision in 2020. The game's director sought to place an increased emphasis on exploration compared to other runner titles, and the development team set out to incorporate as much of the franchise's history as possible by implementing several obscure and older characters. It received mixed reviews from critics, who described it as a visually impressive and nostalgic endless runner that excelled in presentation and accessibility but was undermined by repetitive gameplay, a lack of challenge, and pervasive microtransactions. The game was a commercial success, topping download charts in several countries and becoming the fastest downloaded mobile game on the App and Google Play stores within four days. It was discontinued in 2023.

== Gameplay ==
Crash Bandicoot running through a level in Crash Bandicoot: On the Run!

Crash Bandicoot: On the Run! was an endless runner game in which players controlled either the titular character Crash or his sister Coco, who were tasked with saving the multiverse from domination by Doctor Neo Cortex and his minions. Crash and Coco ran automatically through three-lane levels, with players swiping left or right to switch lanes, up to jump, down to slide, or tapping to perform a spin attack to destroy crates and enemies. Unlike traditional endless runners, levels had a defined start and end, featuring linear "corridor" designs with occasional alternative paths for bonuses, as well as checkpoint to retain progress after death.

Players could collect Wumpa Fruit and materials during runs to craft weapons (such as vials and bombs) in a hub world, required to access boss fights and progress. Collection runs were separate, finite daily modes for gathering resources. Bosses were encounters where players dodged attacks, collected items, and tapped to throw weapons at bosses, with timing affecting bonuses. Progression required crafted items, with long wait times or microtransactions (via purple crystals) to bypass delays, revive after deaths, or unlock resources, slowing gameplay for non-paying players.

The game featured asynchronous multiplayer that allowed players to compete with each other in "survival runs", in which three players ran through a procedurally generated level and attempted to survive the longest. Like the main platformer series, the game included "Time Trials" in which the player attempted to finish a level in the fastest time possible and break special crates that freeze the timer for a set number of seconds. The player was then rewarded with a sapphire, gold, or platinum relic depending on how quickly the level was completed, and the player's best time could be shared with other players.

== Development ==
In February 2020, King was reported to have acquired a license from Activision to develop a mobile game based on Crash Bandicoot; the title's existence was previously leaked through Brazilian Facebook advertisements and highlighted by a Twitter user. The game's engine was developed using Unity under the creative direction of Stephen Jarrett, with Nana Li as the lead conceptual artist and Gigi Chui as the principal designer. Jarrett sought to elevate the runner genre by placing an increased emphasis on exploration, which influenced the variety and detail of the levels. The development team adopted a goal to make "the Crashiest Crash game ever", and set about achieving this by extensively studying and drawing upon the franchise's 25-year history and incorporating characters within the series considered "classic" and "obscure". King stated the game would feature over a hundred cosmetic skins and no loot boxes. Instead, the game would feature battle pass, and seasonal content consisting of special challenges, storylines, and unique bosses. The soundtrack was composed by a team led by Sebastian Aav, and consists of over 50 tracks with an eclectic range of genres including disco, metal, and funk. Both real and virtual instruments were used in the creation of the game's score.

== Release and updates ==
Crash Bandicoot: On the Run! was soft launched on Android in Malaysia on April 22, 2020, under the tentative title Crash Bandicoot Mobile. Three months later, King officially announced a future wide release for iOS and Android under its current title with pre-registration on the Google Play and App stores. It was initially scheduled to be released worldwide on March 25, 2021, for both iOS and Android; however, the iOS version was released two days earlier.

Starting in May 2021, the game received monthly updates featuring new levels, survival runs, skins, and bosses. Beginning on May 7, The Noid — a mascot character for Domino's Pizza during the 1980s — was featured as a miniboss for a limited time, and pizza-themed skins were rewarded to players who defeated the Noid. The game's latest update was released on September 23, 2021 and featured Halloween-themed skins and battle runs. On October 27, 2021, the development team announced a temporary hiatus from major updates in favor of building improvements and new features to the game.

On December 19, 2022, King announced that the game's servers would be deactivated on February 16, 2023, rendering the game unplayable. On the day of the announcement, all in-app purchases were disabled, with King giving players until the game's deactivation to make use of in-game currency. Earlier that month, the game had been silently delisted from app stores, which the game's customer support team claimed was a temporary issue.

== Reception ==
Reception

Aggregate score
| Aggregator | Score |
|---|---|
| Metacritic | 59/100 |

Review scores
| Publication | Score |
|---|---|
| Eurogamer | 8/10 |
| Gamezebo | 3.5/5 |
| Gamereactor | 5/10 |
| Pocket Tactics | 6/10 |
| Multiplayer.it | 7.8/10 |

=== Critical analysis ===
Crash Bandicoot: On the Run! received "mixed or average" reviews according to Metacritic. Daniele Cucchiarelli of Eurogamer saw it as above-average for mobile games but held back by its cost structure. Tommaso Pugliese of Multiplayer.it found it enjoyable but simplistic, while Harry Slater of Gamezebo called it a "perfectly pleasant" diversion. Glen Fox of Pocket Tactics, reviewing the game upon its initial release, was cautiously optimistic, hoping for future updates to add variety, and Kieran Harris of Gamereactor was the most critical, disappointed by the grind and lack of depth compared to the series' home console entries.

Critics described the game as a polished endless runner with intuitive touch controls, tailored to mobile devices and drawing comparisons to Subway Surfers and Temple Run. Cucchiarelli praised the immediate playability, noting its suitability for Crash's "corridor" style from the original series. Pugliese highlighted the consistent flow and simplified boss fights, though Fox criticized the lack of challenge, describing it as "too easy" and missing the series' signature intensity. Harris found the gameplay addictive initially but repetitive due to recycled boss encounters and limited variety, such as the absence of side-scrolling sections or other classic Crash modes (such as boulder chases and jet ski levels).

The amount of content was commended, but long-term engagement was said to be limited by repetitive tasks and lack of diverse gameplay. Cucchiarelli appreciated the nostalgic settings and extra modes like weekly challenges and team rankings, which added some depth. Pugliese emphasized the structured levels and varied situations (such as switches and platforms), but noted repetitive collection runs. Slater found the level design standard but engaging, with boss fights adding a slight twist by requiring players to dodge attacks and throw items. However, Harris and Fox criticized the lack of variety in gameplay modes and the repetitive nature of tasks, with Harris noting that progression felt stagnant without microtransactions. The freemium model was a significant point of criticism. Cucchiarelli described the monetization as "perverse" but noted it was possible to progress without paying, albeit with significant time investment. Pugliese called the system "honest" in its transparency but acknowledged the grind for resources and long wait times. Harris was harsher, stating that microtransactions felt intrusive and put non-paying players at a severe disadvantage, with crafting times slowing progress to a crawl. Fox also highlighted the finite daily resource limits, which forced players to wait or pay to continue.

Critics praised the game's vibrant, colorful visuals, which faithfully recreated the Crash Bandicoot aesthetic. Pugliese noted the high-quality graphics and sound, with catchy music and thematic effects that appeal to fans. Harris called it one of the best-looking mobile games, with impressive lighting and shadows, though not on par with the series' recent titles. Cucchiarelli reported smooth performance on mid-range devices, with minor frame rate issues in multiplayer modes. Slater emphasized the "primary colored jungle silliness" that captured the series' charm, evoking nostalgia. The nostalgic ties to the Crash Bandicoot series was a strength. Harris and Cucchiarelli highlighted the nostalgic appeal, with the former appreciating callbacks to obscure series elements like the Elementals from Crash Bandicoot: The Wrath of Cortex. Slater noted that the nostalgic trappings were effective but served as a front for a standard runner. Fox felt the game captured the look and feel of Crash but lacked the series' challenging essence.

=== Commercial performance ===
On the day of its iOS release, Crash Bandicoot: On the Run! became the most downloaded iOS game in 91 countries as well as the most downloaded iOS app in 76 countries according to Sensor Tower. Following its full launch on March 25, the game was downloaded more than 8.1 million times in one day. It topped the Google Play game chart in 31 countries, as well as the chart for overall downloaded apps in six countries. The game had also previously been downloaded millions of times from being launched in limited regions for pre-release testing several weeks prior to the game's official release. The majority of its downloads occurred in the United States, with the other top four spots occupied by Mexico, Brazil, and the United Kingdom. App analytics platform App Annie registered a slightly higher figure of 9.1 million downloads across the top eight markets, which included Brazil, Mexico, Italy, Russia, France, Germany, and Spain; according to App Annie, the United States contributed 2.6 million downloads, which made up 28.5% of its total figure. NPD Group analyst Mat Piscatella cited the game's success as a factor in sustained console sales for Crash Bandicoot 4: It's About Time.

Within four days of its full release, Crash Bandicoot: On the Run! became the fastest game to reach 20 million downloads between the App and Google Play stores, surpassing the previous record holder Temple Run 2 by a factor of five. App Annie senior market insights manager Donny Kristianto attributed the game's success to its familiarity and freshness, elaborating that "It features the same characters and gameplay mechanic familiar to console fans, yet the game also takes cues from other popular runner games like Subway Surfers and Temple Run — with simple gesture controls making it accessible for both fans of the console titles and new mobile gamers". According to Sensor Tower's Q1 Data Digest report, the game generated $700,000 in revenue within its first week, the second best first week for a King title behind Candy Crush Jelly Saga in 2016.

By the end of March, the game had accumulated 27 million downloads and was the month's second most downloaded mobile game worldwide, behind Supersonic Studios' Join Clash 3D. It topped the month's App Store chart and placed third in the month's Google Play chart behind Join Clash 3D and Garena Free Fire. According to App Annie, it was the second most downloaded new mobile game in the United States in Q1 2021 behind Zynga's High Heels!. It was also the quarter's third most downloaded new game in the United Kingdom, and the quarter's most downloaded new game in Germany.
