= Doctor Neo Cortex =

Character from the Crash Bandicoot series

- Crash Bandicoot character
- Cortex from Crash Bandicoot 4: It's About Time (2020)
- First game: Crash Bandicoot (1996)
- Created by: Andy Gavin; Jason Rubin
- Designed by: Charles Zembillas
- Voiced by: English: Brendan O'Brien (1996); Clancy Brown (1997–2003); Lex Lang (2004–present); Debi Derryberry (child; 2004); Corey Burton (baby; 2017); Japanese: Shōzō Iizuka (1996–2017); Yōsuke Akimoto (2006); Masaaki Itatori (2020); Noriko Suzuki (child; 2004)

In-universe information
- Weapon: Raygun
- Nationality: American

Doctor Neo Periwinkle Cortex is a character and the main antagonist of the Crash Bandicoot video game series. He has appeared in every mainline game in the series as Crash Bandicoot's archenemy, as well as a playable character in several spin-off titles. Cortex is an egomaniacal mad scientist who seeks to achieve world domination with the use of the Evolvo-Ray, a machine capable of creating genetically enhanced soldiers from ordinary animals. Crash was one such subject but thwarted the scientist's plot; Cortex is subsequently determined to eliminate Crash as an obstacle to world domination.

Cortex was created by Naughty Dog founders Andy Gavin and Jason Rubin, and was originally designed by Joe Pearson and Charles Zembillas. Voice actors who have portrayed Cortex include Brendan O'Brien, Clancy Brown and Lex Lang. Cortex has been positively received by reviewers, with much of the praise going to Brown's and Lang's vocal performances as well as the character's portrayal in Crash Twinsanity.

== Concept and creation ==
During the development of Crash Bandicoot, Naughty Dog founders Andy Gavin and Jason Rubin conceived the idea of Cortex while eating near Universal Interactive Studios. Gavin came up with the idea of an "evil genius villain with a big head" who was "all about his attitude and his minions". Rubin, having become fond of the animated television series Pinky and the Brain, imagined a more malevolent version of the Brain with minions resembling the weasel characters in Who Framed Roger Rabbit. After Gavin put on a voice depicting the attitude in mind for the character, he and Rubin instantly came up with the name "Doctor Neo Cortex". Gavin and Rubin described Cortex to character designer Charles Zembillas as "[having] a huge head but a tiny body, he's a mad scientist, and he dresses a bit like a Nazi from The Jetsons". Rubin owns the original sketches of Cortex by Zembillas.

Crash Bandicoot co-artist Joe Pearson wrote a full backstory for Cortex as part of the game's production bible. The backstory details Cortex's birth to a large family of circus performers (his birth is said to have occurred within a gypsy wagon fleeing Peoria, Illinois), the abuse he suffered from being made part of the family act (which culminated in a large "N", standing for "nerd", being tattooed onto his forehead), the murder of his family in a fireworks explosion, and a period of vagrancy and fugitivity with his henchman and high school classmate Nitrus Brio. Cortex was originally envisioned as a self-aware video game character who was bothered by the clichés he embodied and addressed the audience throughout the game. This aspect was removed after Naughty Dog decided that cutscenes would disrupt the game's pacing.

Cortex was kept stationary in many of his early appearances because his game model was unable to walk properly due to the short length of his legs. Artist Nicholas Kole adjusted Cortex's proportions for his appearance in Crash Bandicoot 4: It's About Time, though according to Kole, Cortex's more "debonair" build resulted in his animations turning out "too handsome". In response, the game's artists created an expression sheet to preserve Cortex's comedic characterization.

=== Voice portrayal ===
Cortex is voiced by Brendan O'Brien in the first Crash Bandicoot game, and by Clancy Brown from Crash Bandicoot 2: Cortex Strikes Back up to Crash Nitro Kart. Describing his performance as Cortex, Brown said that the character "comes from all of the bad guys I've ever seen on TV, all of the bad guys I've ever seen in movies... all the mad scientists, like Dr. Smith from Lost in Space—all those ‘evil geniuses.'” Brown eventually left the series due to his dissatisfaction with the video game industry's financial compensation for voice actors. For Crash Twinsanity, Lex Lang was called in for an audition to replace Brown, and was given an explanation that Vivendi Universal Games considered Brown's performance to be "too mean". After voice director Chris Borders described Cortex to Lang and had him listen to signature samples of Brown's performance, he encouraged Lang to play Cortex as more flamboyant and self-absorbed. Lang eventually created a depiction of Cortex that was "master evil with a bit of a childish feminine side that leaks out in his tirades" that had everyone laughing at the lines and the character. Monty Python's Flying Circus was an additional influence on Lang's delivery as Cortex. Lang voiced Cortex from Twinsanity onward. In a flashback to Cortex's childhood in Crash Twinsanity, he is voiced by Debi Derryberry, while Corey Burton voiced Cortex when he is momentarily turned into an infant in the Crash Bandicoot N. Sane Trilogy.

== Characteristics ==
Cortex's most distinguishing physical traits are his large head, yellow skin, pointed goatee and the N tattooed onto his forehead. Cortex is near-bald with the exception of a few areas on his head; Andy Gavin and Jason Rubin jokingly explained that Cortex only uses Rogaine on those select areas, while Joe Pearson's production bible suggests that Cortex had been prematurely balding since his infancy. Cortex stands 1.6 m (5 ft 3 in) and weighs 59 kilograms (130 lb).

Cortex's basic characterization was conceived by Gavin and Rubin as "A villain, all full of himself, unable to conceive of ever doing anything the simple way, but constantly (in his eyes) betrayed by the incompetence of his henchmen". Cortex is depicted as a mad scientist who is ruthlessly and obsessively motivated to dominate the world by the desire to exact vengeance upon a humanity that spurned and humiliated him. He possesses an outrageously high intelligence quotient, which he believes makes him the logical choice to control the world, and he is frequently frustrated by the inferior mentality and failures of his underlings. In awareness of his diminutive build, Cortex avoids physical combat and rationalizes his cowardice by claiming that such engagement is beneath him. Cortex is exceptionally skilled in the fields of engineering and mechanics, which allows him to create a wide variety of devices and machines. Although he is prone to wild mood swings, his single-minded determination keeps him functional. He is highly self-confident and views himself as perfect, which convinces him not to subject himself to the Evolvo-Ray. Cortex is a lifelong loner whose sole friend has been his assistant and childhood associate Doctor Nitrus Brio, whom he treats with contemptuous affection. As a result of his traumatic childhood experiences, Cortex flies into an hysterical rage at imagery of clowns, laugh tracks, seltzer bottles and bananas. Crash Twinsanity artist Daniel Tonkin observed that Cortex is "massively egotistical" and has "a real insecurity complex", while voice actor Lex Lang summarized Cortex's character as a "maniacal narcissist".

== Appearances ==
=== Main series ===
In Crash Bandicoot, Cortex and Brio prepare an evolved bandicoot, Crash, for the Cortex Vortex, a machine that will supposedly brainwash Crash into becoming the general of Cortex's army of "Cortex Commandos" and leading a campaign for world domination. After the Vortex rejects Crash, Cortex chases Crash out of his castle and prepares a female bandicoot named Tawna for experimentation. Cortex is eventually confronted and defeated by Crash, who escapes with Tawna on Cortex's airship. In Crash Bandicoot 2: Cortex Strikes Back, Cortex lands in a cavern where he discovers a large Crystal that he believes will aid him in controlling the world. To this end, he creates a space station armed with a larger version of the Cortex Vortex that is capable of brainwashing the entirety of Earth's populace. However, he is informed by his new henchman Doctor N. Gin that 25 smaller Crystals are needed alongside this "Master Crystal" for the new Cortex Vortex to be functional. To remedy this situation, Cortex abducts Crash and fools him into believing that he is working to save the world from an upcoming solar flux by gathering the Crystals. Cortex is later forced to flee when Crash's sister Coco discovers Cortex's real plan and reveals it to Crash, and Cortex's space station is destroyed by Brio, who has turned against Cortex. In Crash Bandicoot: Warped, the ruins of Cortex's space station crash into Earth and release his master Uka Uka. Cortex takes part in Uka Uka's plan to gather the Crystals in their original places in time by using Doctor Nefarious Tropy's Time-Twisting Machine. Upon Cortex's defeat, the Time-Twisting Machine implodes on itself, trapping Cortex, Tropy and Uka Uka in a prison outside of time and space.

In Crash Bandicoot: The Wrath of Cortex, Cortex creates Crunch Bandicoot in another plot to destroy Crash, and unveils him at a meeting inside Cortex's new space station. After Crunch fails to defeat Crash, Cortex and Uka Uka flee into an escape pod after Uka Uka accidentally causes the space station's catastrophic failure. Their pod lands in a frozen Antarctic wasteland, stranding them both on a large sheet of ice for three years. In Crash Twinsanity, Cortex returns and attempts to eliminate Crash. After another failure, Cortex and Crash encounter a pair of interdimensional parrots named the Evil Twins, who announce their plans to destroy Crash's island and devastate Earth. Cortex temporarily teams up with Crash to defeat the Evil Twins with the aid of the Psychetron, a machine that will allow them to travel between the infinite dimensions. Cortex eventually realizes that the Evil Twins are his childhood pets Victor and Moritz, who were sent to the Tenth Dimension following Cortex's first experiment with the Evolvo-Ray. Cortex sets out with Crash and his niece Nina Cortex to the Tenth Dimension, where they confront and defeat the Evil Twins. After the trio return to their own dimension, Cortex attempts to banish Crash, but the malfunctioning Psychetron teleports Cortex into Crash's brain, where he is trapped with a crowd of dancing Crash duplicates.

In Crash of the Titans, Cortex kidnaps Coco and steals a large quantity of Mojo from an ancient temple, planning to use it to create an army of "Titans", which will aid him in the construction of the Doominator, a giant robot capable of destroying the Wumpa Islands. After failing once more to destroy Crash, Cortex is lambasted by Uka Uka, who replaces him with Nina. Incapacitated for much of the game, Cortex is denied the opportunity to watch his Doominator in action. At the end of the game, Cortex rescues Nina from the collapsing Doominator and praises her for her treachery, but nevertheless promises retribution. In Crash: Mind over Mutant, Cortex deposits Nina at his Evil Public School, then reconciles with Brio to invent the NV, a personal digital assistant that controls whoever uses it by transmitting negative Mojo; the Mojo is forcibly extracted from Uka Uka after Cortex takes him captive. Cortex later engages in a fight with Crash inside his new Space Head space station, empowering himself with the use of Brio's mutation formula. Upon losing the fight, Cortex throws a tantrum, causing the Space Head to plummet towards Earth. Cortex returns to normal and escapes the Space Head in a smaller shuttle.

In Crash Bandicoot 4: It's About Time, which retcons the games following Warped from continuity, Cortex and Tropy escape from their temporal prison, which creates rifts leading to different dimensions, and they begin a plot to conquer the multiverse. After another defeat to Crash, Cortex prepares to retire until Tropy announces his own plot to reshape the multiverse, which would erase both Crash and Cortex from existence. Cortex, incensed by Tropy's betrayal, teams up with Crash and his group to stop Tropy and seal the dimensional rifts. Following a celebratory trip to a futuristic metropolis, Cortex kidnaps Kupuna-Wa − a magical "Quantum Mask" with time-altering powers − and uses her to travel back in time to his original bid for world domination and avert Crash's creation. However, he is unable to convince his past self to abandon the experiment, and is again defeated by the present Crash. The present Cortex is banished by the Quantum Masks to the end of the universe, where Cortex relaxes on a beach and enjoys the peace and quiet until Uka Uka suddenly appears before him.

A series of collectible "Flashback Tapes" in the game detail Cortex's training of the then-unnamed Crash prior to his initiation into Cortex's army, and the final tape featuring Crash includes Cortex christening him with the name "Crashworth Cortex the First", or "Crash" for short. In the subsequent tapes, which take place following Crash's escape from Cortex's castle, Cortex trains Crash's sister, whom he codenames "Coco", hires N. Gin, and creates Dingodile as a potential substitute for Coco, who ultimately escapes Cortex's castle under the guise of undertaking another trial.

=== Other games ===
Cortex appears as a playable character in the racing titles Crash Team Racing, Crash Nitro Kart and Crash Tag Team Racing, as well as the party titles Crash Bash and Crash Boom Bang!. Cortex is the main antagonist in the handheld titles Crash Bandicoot: The Huge Adventure, Crash Bandicoot Purple: Ripto's Rampage and Spyro Orange: The Cortex Conspiracy. Although Cortex is absent from the narrative of Crash Bandicoot 2: N-Tranced, he is a playable character in the game's multiplayer mode. On mobile platforms, Cortex appears as an antagonist in the racing title Crash Bandicoot Nitro Kart 3D and the runner game Crash Bandicoot: On the Run!. Cortex is a playable character in the multiplayer game, Crash Team Rumble. Outside of the Crash Bandicoot series, Cortex appeared alongside Crash as a playable character in the PlayStation 3 and PlayStation 4 versions of Skylanders: Imaginators.

== Promotion and reception ==
Cortex has been featured in a series of Crash Bandicoot action figures produced by Resaurus. For Crash Bandicoot 2: Cortex Strikes Back, Resaurus produced a "Dr. Neo Cortex" figure bundled with a laser gun, a Wumpa Fruit and a Crystal as seen in the game. A vinyl figure by Funko and a rubber duck by Numskull Designs have also been made in Cortex's image. On July 28, 2020, First 4 Figures unveiled a 21-inch resin collectible figure of Cortex, with an estimated Q3 2021 release date. The figure depicts a scene from the boss fight against him in Crash Bandicoot: Warped, in which Cortex wields a ray gun and a timed mine. The figure will be released in both a standard and exclusive edition; the exclusive version features a light-up hoverboard, mine and smoke trail.

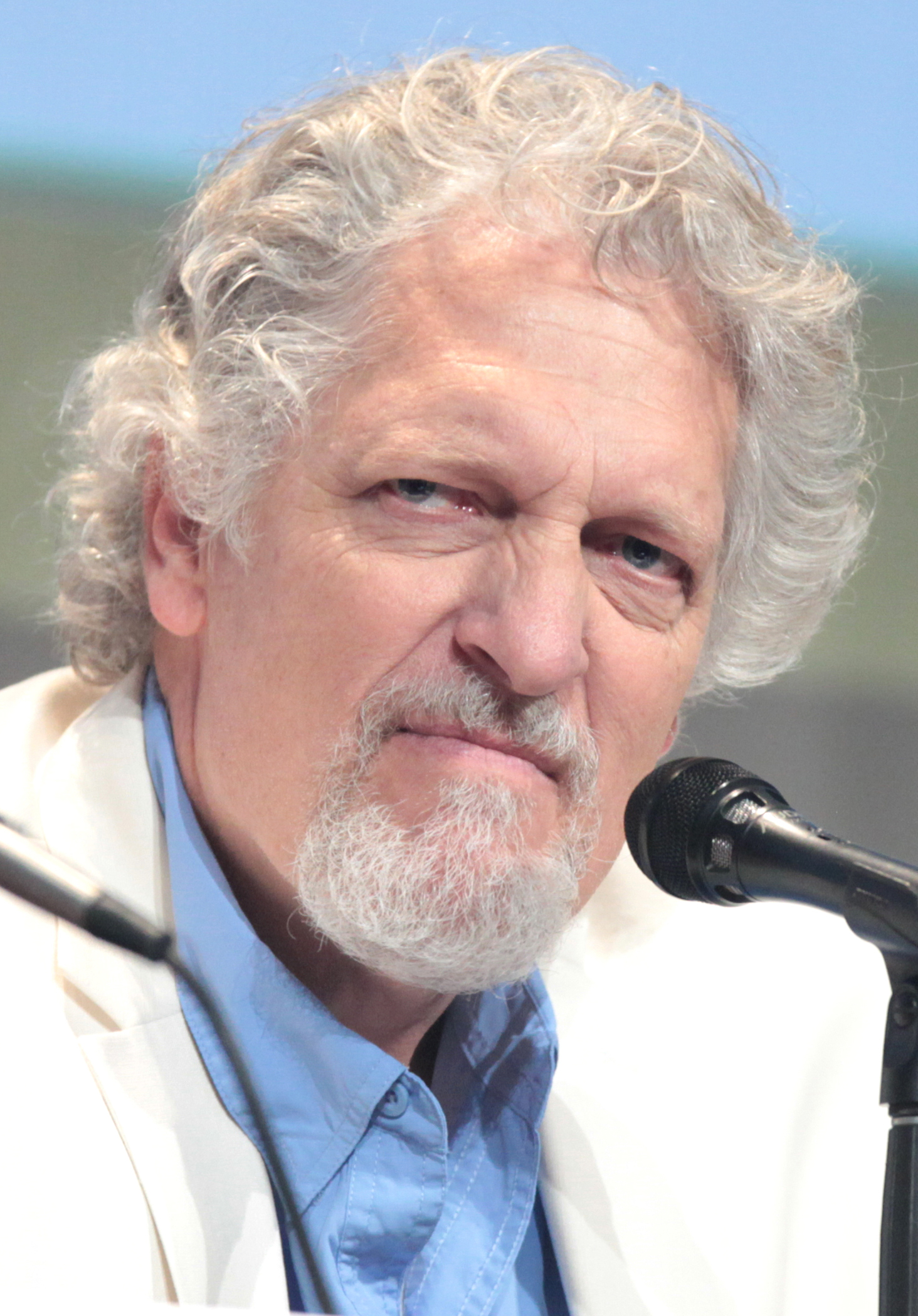
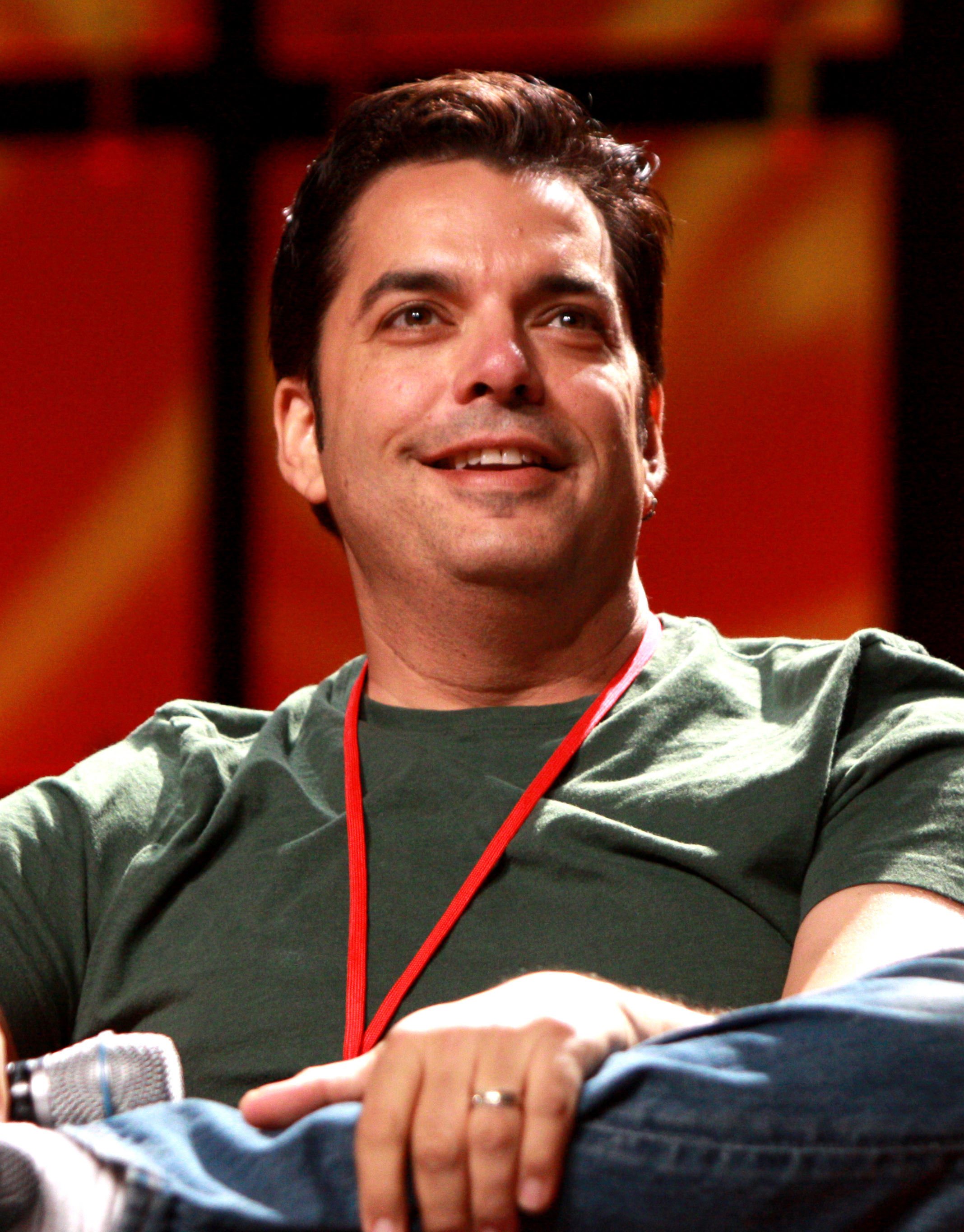
Voice actors Clancy Brown and Lex Lang have both received positive critical attention for their performances as Cortex.

Cortex has ranked within a number of lists of best video game villains. Robert Workman of GameDaily ranked Cortex number twenty-three on his list of the "Top 25 Evil Masterminds of All Time", stating "His twisted Wario-like hair, his pointy goatee and that big N stamped in the middle of his forehead makes him look like pure evil." Chris Buffa, also of GameDaily, ranked Cortex at number twenty-one in his "Top 25 Craziest Villains" list. In the Guinness World Records' 2013 Gamer's Edition, Cortex was ranked 42nd on its list of 50 greatest video game villains. GamesRadar+ ranked Cortex 98th in their 2013 list of the best villains in video game history.

Clancy Brown's vocal performances as Cortex have received positive notice from reviewers. Major Mike of GamePro and Mark Cooke of Game Revolution both praised Brown's performance in Crash Bandicoot 2: Cortex Strikes Back, with Cooke describing Brown as "hilarious" and "satirical". In his review of Crash Bandicoot: The Wrath of Cortex, Ben Kosmina of Nintendo World Report singled out Brown's voice-acting as "great", and recalled Cortex's line "...and a woman with nice, big... bags of ice for my head" being a highlight in Crash Bandicoot: Warped. Chris Carter of Destructoid, in his review of the Crash Bandicoot N. Sane Trilogy, stated his preference of Brown's performance in the original trilogy over Lex Lang's performance in the remastered version.

Cortex's portrayal and Lang's vocal performance in Crash Twinsanity were also praised. Reviewers appreciated the added dimension to Cortex's personality and considered the character and his dialogue to be the most entertaining and accomplished in the game. Nick Valentino of GameZone described Cortex as "nutty in the best possible way", while Andrew Reiner of Game Informer admitted that "turning Cortex into a cross-dressing lunatic brought about a few chuckles".

Eddie Makuch of GameSpot, discussing the demo for Crash Bandicoot 4: It's About Time, was delighted by Cortex's "cartoonishly evil" personality, and Alessandro Fillari of the same publication appreciated his humanization after observing him from a distance in the original games, describing him as "sort of like the Wile E. Coyote, but with more advanced technology and a bigger ego. He's somehow always two steps behind Crash, which is hilarious". Alicia Haddick of GamesRadar+ characterized Cortex as a tragic villain who lacks an intimidation factor or much control over his subordinates, is frequently betrayed by his allies, and is never thanked on the rare occasions that he saves the world from a greater threat.
