= Tinytim =

Tinytim or TinyTIM may refer to:

- Tinytim, the flowering plant Geocarpon minimum
- TinyTIM, an online social medium

== See also ==
- Tiny Tim (disambiguation)
