= Tiny Tim =

Tiny Tim may refer to:

== People ==
- Tiny Tim (musician) (1932–1996), American musician
- Tiny Tim, nickname for Australian football player Tim Cahill (born 1979)

== Arts, entertainment, and media ==
- Tiny Tim (A Christmas Carol), a fictional character from the 1843 Charles Dickens novella A Christmas Carol
- Tiny Tim (comic strip), an American comic strip that ran from 1933 to 1958
- Tiny Tim, from The Topper comic strip
- Tiny Tim, the eponymous baby from the American schoolyard rhyme "Miss Lucy had a baby"

== Other uses ==
- Tiny Tim (rocket), an anti-ship rocket deployed by the United States Navy at the end of World War II
- Tiny Tim (tomato), a dwarf tomato cultivar

== See also ==
- Tinytim (disambiguation)
- Tiny (disambiguation)
- Tinny Tim
