= Crash Team Rumble =

2023 video game

- Cover art featuring the playable characters (clockwise from bottom left). Crash, N. Brio, Tawna, N. Tropy, Catbat, Dingodile, Coco, and Cortex.
- Developer: Toys for Bob
- Publisher: Activision
- Directors: Dan Neil; Lou Studdert
- Producers: Matt Copeland; Maria Rosseau; Scot Tumlin; Elena Morillo-Peterson; Peter Kavic
- Designer: Toby Schadt
- Programmer: Brent Gumns Hostrawser
- Artists: Amber Long; Dev Madan; Josh Nadelberg
- Writer: Mandy Benanav
- Composer: Stephan Vankov
- Series: Crash Bandicoot
- Engine: Unreal Engine 4
- Platforms: PlayStation 4; PlayStation 5; Xbox One; Xbox Series X/S
- Release: June 20, 2023
- Genres: Real-time strategy, platform
- Mode: Multiplayer

Crash Team Rumble is a 2023 online multiplayer video game developed by Toys for Bob and published by Activision for the PlayStation 4, PlayStation 5, Xbox One, and Xbox Series X/S. The game features several members of the Crash Bandicoot series as playable characters. The gameplay pits two teams of players against each other as they stockpile Wumpa Fruit while impeding the opposing team's efforts.

In 2022, Activision teased the announcement of a new Crash Bandicoot title by sending influencers a pizza box with a receipt; the game was later announced at the Game Awards 2022. It features the playable characters from Crash Bandicoot 4: It's About Time, whose movesets were adjusted for a multiplayer format. Development was influenced by Toys for Bob's experience on Call of Duty, shaping a content roadmap beyond the first season.

Crash Team Rumble received mixed reviews from critics, who praised its gameplay, map design, and presentation but criticized its content variety, live-service elements, and pricing. Reviewers doubted the title's longevity and ability to sustain a community. The game's three seasons introduced new gameplay modes as well as new characters and maps, including some from the Spyro series. It was Toys for Bob's final game produced as an Activision studio before becoming independent in February 2024, and the game received a final content update the following month.

== Gameplay ==
In Crash Team Rumble, players are tasked with collecting and stockpiling Wumpa Fruit for their team, a row of which is visible in front of the pictured player character Crash (center). The character to the left of Crash is using a "Junker Ball", a power-up specific to the stage Calamity Canyon.

Crash Team Rumble is a four-versus-four online multiplayer game in which two teams compete to collect and deposit 2,000 Wumpa Fruit first. Players collect Wumpa Fruit either directly off the ground or by breaking crates scattered across the arena, then deposit them at their team's bank to score points. Crates can be broken by spinning, slamming, or sliding into them. Depositing requires a brief moment at the bank, creating opportunities for enemy interference.

The character roster is divided into three roles: scorers, blockers, and boosters. Scorers (such as Crash, Tawna and Catbat) are specialized for collecting and depositing Wumpa Fruit, with abilities like Tawna's grappling hook granting high mobility. Scorers can carry more Wumpa Fruit at a time and are generally more agile. Blockers (such as Dingodile, N. Tropy's female counterpart and N. Brio) disrupt enemy scorers with area-denial abilities, exemplified by Dingodile's vacuum and N. Tropy's energy balls. Boosters (such as Coco and Cortex) support the team by capturing Gems for score multipliers or collecting Relics to activate map perks, with abilities like Coco's Quantum Walls being used to deter pursuers. The roles are flexible and allow players to adapt, though fulfilling role-specific duties shortens ability cooldowns.

Gems are platforms that, when captured, boost Wumpa Fruit deposits. Relics are scattered items that can be used at Relic Stations to unlock power-ups. Items provided by common Relic Stations grant minor perks such as jump pads. Each map contains one Epic Relic Station that requires more relics than standard stations and provides map-specific power-ups such as Uka Uka's asteroids or TNT drones. The game's maps feature unique hazards and layouts that encourage platforming skills and strategic routes.

Each of the characters has a unique moveset tied to their appearances in the Crash Bandicoot series, such as Crash's spin and Cortex's ray gun. Players pre-select a Power per match, which charges during play. Examples of Powers include a Wumpa Stash that grants bonus Wumpa Fruit or a Gasmoxian Guard that acts as area denial. Players can attack enemies to disrupt scoring, using character-specific moves or environmental hazards. Blocking involves guarding banks or knocking Wumpa Fruit from opponents, who drop Wumpa Fruit when hit or knocked into pits. Characters cannot be swapped mid-match. The game includes a tutorial and detailed move menu, and features cross-platform play.

== Development and release ==
On October 7, 2022, Activision delivered a package to influencers consisting of a pizza box with an attached receipt announcing the release of Crash Bandicoot 4: It's About Time via Steam on October 18. A message at the bottom of the receipt teased the announcement of a new Crash Bandicoot title on December 8, the date of the Game Awards 2022. At the awards ceremony, Crash Team Rumble was announced via a debut trailer, with a projected 2023 release for the PlayStation 4, PlayStation 5, Xbox One and Xbox Series X/S. It is the latest Crash Bandicoot title to be developed by Toys for Bob after Crash Bandicoot 4: It's About Time.

Dan Neil was the game's creative director. Amber Long, Dev Madan and Josh Nadelberg served as the game's art directors. Toby Schadt and Brent Gumns Hostrawser were the respective design and engineering directors. The game was produced by Matt Copeland, Maria Rosseau, Scot Tumlin, Elena Morillo-Peterson, and Peter Kavic. The sound was designed by Jason Bowers and Joshua Jones, and the music was designed by Stephan Vankov. Mandy Benanav served as the writer.

The game includes the five playable characters from Crash Bandicoot 4: It's About Time and retained their movesets but had "softened metrics" such as easier jumps to accommodate multiplayer dynamics. The environmental dangers were also reduced compared to the precise, challenging platforming of Crash 4. Toys for Bob ensured movement matched the fluidity of a AAA platformer, despite the shift to multiplayer. Balancing the heroes' movesets for competitive play was complex and was informed by data from an open beta. Player feedback was largely positive and aligned with expectations, though the game's unique competitive platforming style surprised some fans. Neil contrasted Crash Team Rumble from the series' previous multiplayer spin-offs in its emphasis on the platforming that defines the main series, which was blended with competitive play. Activision Blizzard provided guidance but allowed Toys For Bob creative freedom, respecting their reputation for quality and fun. The studio's experience with Call of Duty informed Crash Team Rumble's development, inspiring the team's content roadmap approach to development beyond the game's first season.

On March 21, 2023, Activision announced a closed beta release from April 20 to 24 for those who pre-ordered the game, with a full release following on June 20. The game was released in standard and deluxe editions; the standard edition includes a battle pass for the first season, while the deluxe edition includes an additional battle pass for the second season, a 25-tier instant unlock for the first season, and a pack of cosmetic skins and equipment. The first season, which ran from June 20 to September 11, introduced Doctor N. Gin and Ripper Roo as playable characters. The second season introduced Party Mode, a co-operative mode consisting of five selectable challenges, as well as two new maps, a new power-up, and the playable character Ripto from Spyro 2: Ripto's Rage!. The third and final season, which launched December 7, introduced Spyro and Elora from the Spyro series as playable characters as well as maps based on the Artisans' Home and Summer Forest from the same series.

Toys for Bob announced its impending spin-off from Activision on February 29, 2024. The same day, an in-game message announced the game's final update would release on March 4 and include the content from all previous seasons. Crash Team Rumble was Toys for Bob's last game under Activision before its independence.

== Reception ==
Reception

Aggregate score
| Aggregator | Score |
|---|---|
| Metacritic | (PS5) 67/100 (XSXS) 71/100 |

Review scores
| Publication | Score |
|---|---|
| Destructoid | 7.5/10 |
| Game Informer | 8/10 |
| GameSpot | 7/10 |
| Hardcore Gamer | 3/5 |
| IGN | 7/10 |
| Jeuxvideo.com | 14/20 |
| MeriStation | 5/10 |
| Push Square | 7/10 |
| Shacknews | 8/10 |
| TechRadar | 3/5 |

Crash Team Rumble received "mixed or average" reviews from critics, according to review aggregator website Metacritic. The core gameplay was praised for its sense of fun, accessibility, and faithfulness to the Crash Bandicoot series. Chris Carter of Destructoid and Rhys Wood of TechRadar highlighted the satisfying platforming controls, with characters such as Crash and Coco feeling authentic. Aron Garst of Game Informer and Mark Delaney of GameSpot noted the chaotic and engaging matches that allowed for heroics and comebacks, with Delaney likening the game to Rocket League and Fall Guys. Max Cagnard of Jeuxvideo.com and Liam Croft of Push Square emphasized the short learning curve, while Shacknews's Ozzie Mejia credited the map design and role flexibility for keeping sessions varied and enjoyable. Will Borger of IGN and David Arroyo of MeriStation noted that the fun diminished after a few hours due to repetitive gameplay loops, especially with only one mode.

The nine launch maps were praised for their creative, colorful designs and unique gimmicks. Borger compared the maps to those of arena shooters Quake and Halo, noting their distinct layouts and strategic demands. Mejia and Hardcore Gamer's Kevin Dunsmore highlighted the maps' incorporation of series locales and mechanics such as Relic Stations, which added game-changing perks. Wood appreciated how each map's "flavor" complemented the quickfire matches, and Carter noted their balance of size for exploration and conflict.

The character roster was appreciated for its variety and distinct playstyles, though some balance issues and unlock requirements were criticized. Carter and Garst praised the role flexibility, which allowed players to adapt organically. Cagnard and Croft highlighted the unique abilities, which added depth. However, Borger and Arroyo pointed out imbalances, with characters like N. Tropy, Tawna and Coco being overpowered due to superior mobility or abilities. Arroyo ranked N. Tropy, Crash, and N. Brio as top-tier. Borger noted that the grind to unlock N. Tropy felt unfair as it granted access to who he considered the most powerful character to only a few hardcore gamers.

The single competitive mode and limited content were widely considered a drawback, as they led to repetitive gameplay and raised concerns over long-term engagement. Dunsmore noted that the quick match length and single mode made variety "die out fast". Arroyo called the game's offering flat, with rare comebacks and repetitive matches. Croft and Wood suggested that the game would be suitable for short bursts but faced a struggle to retain players beyond a week or two due to competition from larger multiplayer titles.

The live-service model, including a slow-progressing battle pass and premium price, was heavily criticized as misaligned with the game's scope and player expectations. Carter and Delaney found the battle pass progression slow and the cosmetic rewards lackluster, clashing with the game's casual vibe. Arroyo and Wood called the progression system "grindy" and uninspiring, with Arroyo likening it to mobile game mechanics. Some argued that the game's price was a barrier for a multiplayer-only title, suggesting that a free-to-play model would have been more suitable. Croft noted that although the launch battle pass was included and microtransactions were absent, future monetization remained a concern.

Feedback on visuals and audio focused on technical issues. Dunsmore and Cagnard praised the colorful, cartoonish art style and faithful sound design, though Cagnard noted minor aliasing and lengthy load times. Delaney mentioned cosmetic clipping issues and odd error messages, while Croft and Wood highlighted inconsistent load times. Arroyo criticized the lack of accessibility options such as colorblind modes.

Critics expressed concern for the game's ability to sustain a community due to its pricing, limited content, and live-service model, with some fearing an early shutdown. Carter worried about its preservation as a live-service game, despite cross-play support. Arroyo cited a low Twitch viewership and a small player base, predicting struggles without a free-to-play shift or major updates. Delaney reported small player pools, with repeated opponents indicating a struggling community, and Wood questioned its shelf life, referencing the failed live-service titles Anthem and Marvel's Avengers. Croft, while doubting its ability to compete with larger multiplayer games, hoped for post-launch support to bolster its niche.
