= Tiny, Virginia =

Unincorporated community in Virginia, United States

- Unincorporated community
- Location within Virginia Location within the United States
- Coordinates: 37°06′20″N 82°14′23″W
- Country: United States
- State: Virginia
- County: Dickenson
- Elevation: 1,411 ft (430 m)
- Time zone: UTC−5 (Eastern (EST))
  - Summer (DST): UTC−4 (EDT)
- Area code: 276
- GNIS feature ID: 1494283

Tiny is an unincorporated community in Dickenson County, Virginia, United States.

== History ==
A post office was established at Tiny in 1907, and remained in operation until it was discontinued in 1963. Tiny was likely a descriptive name for its diminutive size.
