= Crash Bandicoot N. Sane Trilogy =

2017 video game compilation

- Developer: Vicarious Visions (Note: Original games developed by Naughty Dog. Ported to Nintendo Switch by Toys for Bob and Windows by Iron Galaxy.)
- Publisher: Activision
- Director: Dan Tanguay
- Producer: Kara Massie
- Designer: Dan Tanguay
- Programmer: Dave Calvin
- Artist: Dustin King
- Composer: Josh Mancell (Note: Mancell was the composer of the original games; the music was arranged by uncredited members of Vicarious Visions' audio team. Mark Mothersbaugh is also listed as a composer but was only a music producer for the original games.)
- Series: Crash Bandicoot
- Engine: Vicarious Visions Alchemy
- Platforms: PlayStation 4; Nintendo Switch; Windows; Xbox One
- Release: PlayStation 4; June 30, 2017; NS, Windows, Xbox One; June 29, 2018
- Genre: Platform
- Mode: Single-player

Crash Bandicoot N. Sane Trilogy is a 2017 platform game compilation developed by Vicarious Visions and published by Activision for the PlayStation 4. It includes remasters of the first three video games in the Crash Bandicoot series: Crash Bandicoot (1996), Cortex Strikes Back (1997), and Warped (1998); which were originally developed by Naughty Dog and published by Sony Computer Entertainment for the PlayStation. It was later ported to Nintendo Switch, Windows, and Xbox One in 2018.

Prior to the compilation's announcement, the Crash Bandicoot series had been dormant since 2010. Vicarious Visions, lacking the original source code, rebuilt the games using polygon meshes provided by Sony and Naughty Dog, decoding outdated formats. Missing animations, textures, and music were recreated by cross-referencing video footage, concept art, and fan feedback from online communities. Modern enhancements included high-resolution textures, dynamic lighting, an updated soundtrack with live instruments, and the addition of Crash's sister Coco as a playable character across all games, while preserving core gameplay and speedrunning exploits.

The N. Sane Trilogy received generally positive reviews from critics, with praise for its faithful yet visually improved recreation of the original games, cohesive presentation, and nostalgic appeal, though the dated controls, inconsistent difficulty, some unpolished vehicle sections and altered jumping physics received criticism. The game was a commercial success, selling 20 million units worldwide by June 2024.

== Gameplay ==
The Crash Bandicoot N. Sane Trilogy is a compilation of the first three Crash Bandicoot games – Crash Bandicoot (1996), Crash Bandicoot 2: Cortex Strikes Back (1997), and Crash Bandicoot: Warped (1998) – originally developed for the PlayStation and remastered for modern platforms. The trilogy follows Crash Bandicoot, an anthropomorphic marsupial, as he navigates linear 3D platforming levels to thwart Doctor Neo Cortex and his henchmen. In each game, the player controls Crash or his sister Coco through linear levels, spinning to defeat enemies, jumping across platforms, and breaking crates for Wumpa Fruit (100 for an extra life). Aku Aku masks provide protection, with up to three granting temporary invincibility. Level themes include jungles, ruins, snowy areas, sewers, and past time periods, with some levels including vehicles and chase sequences. Clear gems are rewarded for breaking every crate in a level, while colored gems are earned via specific tasks.

The compilation, described as a "remaster plus", is a reconstruction of the original games, retaining the level geometry but enhancing the visuals and audio and adding quality-of-life features. The visuals were completely rebuilt with enhanced lighting, detailed textures, and remade cutscenes, creating a cohesive aesthetic across all three games. The audio includes a re-orchestrated soundtrack, updated sound effects, and re-recorded voice acting. Crash's sister Coco, who was originally playable in select levels of Warped, is playable in most levels across all games, with unique animations but identical mechanics. Time trials, a feature introduced in Warped, have been added to the previous two games along with online leaderboards. The compilation includes a unified save system across all three games, including auto-saves after the completion of each level. The loading screens include hints that guide players toward collectibles and alternate paths.

== Development ==
A comparison between the first level of the original game (top) and the N. Sane Trilogy version (bottom)

Prior to the announcement of the N. Sane Trilogy, the Crash Bandicoot franchise had been dormant, the last entry being the 2010 title Crash Bandicoot Nitro Kart 2. Regarding the series' future, Activision CEO Eric Hirshberg said, "I don't have anything official to announce, but I can speak as an individual, I love Crash Bandicoot. Those were some of my favorite video games growing up. And I would love to find a way to bring him back, if we could." Andy Gavin, co-founder of Naughty Dog and co-creator of Crash Bandicoot, expressed desire for an HD version of the first four games or a reboot of the series. Fellow co-creator Jason Rubin said he was hopeful that Activision would "bring Crash back to their glory days and that the character is still very dear to fans between 18–49 years".

In June 2013, Gavin suggested a reboot for the franchise to regain its appeal, proposing a revisit of Crash's origin and original conflict with Cortex. He recommended adopting a modern, free-roaming gameplay style while maintaining the Looney Tunes-inspired animation and addictive action that made the original Crash games stand out. He emphasized that Crash was once "cool", with a whimsical yet smart tone, which he felt had been lost in later games. In November 2013, an Activision representative confirmed the publisher's continued ownership of the Crash Bandicoot property, as well as their ongoing exploration of avenues to resurrect the series. In July 2014, Sony Interactive Entertainment CEO Andrew House revealed that the publisher had considered reviving the Crash Bandicoot series, saying "It's never off the table."

The compilation was developed by Vicarious Visions. The games were reconstructed nearly from scratch due to the absence of the original source code and limited access to reference materials. Because the original game engine was tailored specifically for the original PlayStation, it was unusable for modern platforms. The team relied on polygon meshes provided by Sony and Naughty Dog, which were stored on hard drives in an outdated, compressed format that needed to be decoded. These meshes provided the foundational geometry for level architecture and scale, but the animations, character designs, artificial intelligence, control timing, textures, and much of the music were missing.

To ensure fidelity to the originals, Vicarious Visions meticulously cross-referenced video footage of the original games with their prototypes to match the timings and gameplay mechanics. The development team, guided by producer Kara Massie and creative director Dan Tanguay, consulted concept art, studied visual influences like Looney Tunes and Who Framed Roger Rabbit, and gathered insights from online fan communities and guides to verify gameplay details. Hardcore fans within the quality assurance and design teams provided feedback to maintain authenticity, while speedrunning exploits were deliberately preserved or expanded to appeal to dedicated players. Because of this approach, Vicarious Visions coined the term "Remaster Plus" to describe the compilation rather than referring to the games as remakes.

Recreating Crash's core mechanics, particularly his jump, required extensive iteration to match the original feel while satisfying both nostalgic players and hardcore fans. The team prioritized maintaining the series' challenging platforming while improving accessibility for new players. For instance, telegraphed hazards, such as visual cues for threats like the electrified lab assistants in Cortex Strikes Back, were added to enhance clarity without altering the core puzzles. The reconstruction of the "N. Sanity Beach" level was regarded as a benchmark for the compilation's audio, animation, lighting, and level design.

Vicarious Visions used their proprietary Alchemy engine to implement modern graphical techniques and enhance the presentation while preserving the essence of the original games. The textures were upgraded from low-resolution 16x16 or 32x32 pixels to 1,024x1,024 or 2,048x2,048 pixels, and dynamic lighting was introduced to create immersive environments, such as realistic rainfall and extended draw distances. New workflows were developed to accommodate five levels for which the original data was missing entirely. The audio team was led by Justin Joyner, who updated the soundtrack with higher-fidelity instruments and live recordings while retaining the original MIDI files and select sound effects. The decision to add Coco Bandicoot as a playable character across all three games was made early in production, with Massie invoking Warped's time travel element as a narrative justification for her inclusion in the previous two games.

== Release ==
The N. Sane Trilogy was announced at E3 2016 on June 13, 2016. In April 2017, a contest was held for fans to submit ideas for idle animations for the character, with the winners announced the following month. The compilation was released for the PlayStation 4 on June 30, 2017. Two additional levels were added as post-launch downloadable content: "Stormy Ascent", a level originally designed for the first game but cut due to its difficulty, and "Future Tense", a brand new level created by Vicarious Visions for the third game.

The N. Sane Trilogy was ported to Nintendo Switch, Windows, and Xbox One, and was initially set for a release date of July 10, 2018; the date was later moved up to June 29. The Nintendo Switch, Windows and Xbox One ports were developed by Toys for Bob, Iron Galaxy and Vicarious Visions, respectively. The Switch port in particular was not originally intended until a lone engineer at Vicarious Visions successfully ported the game's first level to the platform, proving it was feasible to port the entire trilogy. Sega published the Japanese Switch version on October 18, 2018, while Sony Interactive Entertainment published the Japanese PlayStation 4 version.

In the United States, the N. Sane Trilogy was the second best-selling game in its first month. In the United Kingdom, the N. Sane Trilogy was the best-selling game for eight consecutive weeks since its initial release. Its release also saw the biggest launch of a game in the first half of 2017, behind Tom Clancy's Ghost Recon Wildlands. The Crash Bandicoot N. Sane Trilogy sold over 2.5 million units in the first three months of its release, increasing to 10 million by February 2019. By June 2024, it had sold 20 million units worldwide.

== Reception ==
Reception

Aggregate scores
Aggregator	Score
Metacritic	(PS4) 80/100 (NS) 78/100 (XONE) 79/100 (PC) 76/100
OpenCritic	80% recommend

Review scores
Publication	Score
Destructoid	8.5/10
Electronic Gaming Monthly	4/5
Game Informer	8/10
GameRevolution	PS4: 4.5/5; NS: 4/5
GameSpot	6/10
GamesRadar+	3.5/5
Hardcore Gamer	4/5
HobbyConsolas	83%
IGN	8.5/10
Jeuxvideo.com	PS4: 17/20; NS: 15/20
MeriStation	PS4: 8.8/10; NS: 8/10
Nintendo Life	7/10
Nintendo World Report	7.5/10
PC Gamer (US)	6/10
Pocket Gamer	7/10
Polygon	6/10
Push Square	8/10
The Games Machine (Italy)	8/10

Crash Bandicoot N. Sane Trilogy received "generally favorable" reviews across all platforms, according to review aggregator website Metacritic. The trilogy was lauded for its exceptional graphical update, with Alvaro Alonso of HobbyConsolas and Peter Brown of GameSpot comparing the vibrant, cartoon-like visuals to modern animated films. Paula Croft of MeriStation, Jonathon Dornbush of IGN, and James Kozanitis of GameRevolution highlighted the lush environments, enhanced lighting, detailed textures, and expressive animations, which were said to breathe new life into the series while maintaining its nostalgic charm. The sound design, including re-orchestrated music and updated sound effects, was generally praised for enhancing immersion, though Evan Slead of Electronic Gaming Monthly noted that the new soundtrack arrangements can feel less intense than the originals. Jordan Helm of Hardcore Gamer felt that the sound effects and voice acting lacked some of the originals' personality and occasionally faltered due to insufficient mixing. Reviewers highlighted the Switch version's portability and solid performance despite its lower resolution, reduced lighting contrast and occasional frame rate stutters. Danielle Partis of Pocket Gamer lamented the omission of Crash's iconic victory dance, while Louise Blain of GamesRadar+ was comforted by the politically correct adjustments made to the character Tawna.

Reviewers appreciated the faithful recreation of the original games' level layouts and gameplay, with Cortex Strikes Back and Warped considered superior due to their improved level design, variety, and mechanics like sliding and double jumps. The first game was often described as the most difficult and least polished, with frustrating jumps due to imprecise hitboxes or camera angles. Vicarious Visions' additions, such as extra checkpoints, auto-saving, and time trials across all games, were welcomed as quality-of-life improvements. The controls and fixed camera angles were said to feel clunky by contemporary standards, particularly in the first game, leading to frustration for new players. The vehicle levels, particularly in Warped, were criticized for their loose controls.

The ability to play as Coco Bandicoot across all three games was a popular addition, though reviewers noted it as largely cosmetic, as her moveset mirrors Crash's; Slead suggested Coco could have had unique mechanics to differentiate her. The time trials with online leaderboards and level hints on loading screens were appreciated for adding replayability and accessibility, particularly for newcomers. The unified save system and seamless switching between games were praised for enhancing the package's cohesiveness, though Epyon of Jeuxvideo.com and Sammy Barker of Push Square criticized the lack of smoother transitions between games due to loading times.

The trilogy was regarded as an excellent nostalgic experience for fans that captures the charm of the original PlayStation era. However, its appeal to new players was debated, with Partis, PC Gamer's Andy Kelly, and Polygon's Ashley Oh arguing that the mechanics and high difficulty may alienate those without nostalgic attachment. The trilogy's linear, restrictive design contrasted with modern platformers, making it feel like a relic to some, though Epyon and The Games Machine's Davide Mancini found its challenge timeless. Kozanitis and Nintendo Life's Alex Olney suggested playing the games in reverse order to ease into the trilogy's difficulty before tackling the first game.

Following the compilation's release, fans and players observed that the jumping mechanics felt less precise, with a tendency to slip off platform edges, making certain levels more challenging. A fan theory, supported by Reddit user Tasty Carcass, suggested that the remaster employs "pill-shaped" collision boxes for the characters' feet, as opposed to the flat collision boxes used in the original games. This rounded collision shape, common in the Unity engine, causes characters to slide off edges rather than land securely, affecting jump precision and increasing the likelihood of falling. A visual demonstration by Twitch streamer DingDongVG further highlighted that Crash's jumping arc is faster, resulting in quicker landings compared to the original games. Vicarious Visions, via Activision's editorial manager Kevin Kelly, later confirmed these observations. The developer acknowledged that the remaster, particularly the first game, requires greater precision in jumping due to differences in the jumping mechanics and character collision system. The development team used Crash Bandicoot: Warped as a reference point while individually tuning each game's mechanics, with the altered collision system and faster jump arc contributing to the increased difficulty, especially in the first game. Kelly recommended that new players begin with the second or third games, which are less demanding, before tackling the first. He warned that adapting to the new mechanics may pose an additional challenge for players familiar with the originals. No patch to align the remaster's handling with the originals was ever announced or released. In 2025, Andy Gavin criticized the compilation for "botch[ing]" the jump mechanics by making all jumps maximum height, resulting in floaty gameplay.

=== Awards ===
The Crash Bandicoot N. Sane Trilogy won the award for "Best Remake/Remaster" at IGN's 2017 awards, while the readers and staff of Game Informer voted it as the "Best Remastered Action" and "Best Remastered/Remade" game in theirs. It was also nominated for the Tappan Zee Bridge Award for "Best Remake" at the New York Game Awards 2018, and won the award for "Game, Classic Revival" at the National Academy of Video Game Trade Reviewers Awards, whereas its other nomination was for the "Original Light Mix Score, Franchise" category. It was also nominated for "People's Choice" at the Italian Video Game Awards.
