= Tara Tiny =

Overview
- Manufacturer: Tara International
- Also called: The cheapest Car
- Production: 2008–present
- Assembly: Kolkata, West Bengal

Body and chassis
- Class: City car

Chronology
- Predecessor: none

Tara Tiny is an electric car manufactured by India's Tara International, an arm of Bengal Enamel, in association with China's Aucma.

Its assembly line is located in Kolkata, West Bengal. Production started in 2008, and is still operating.

The Tiny is rumoured to be the world's least expensive car, priced at ₹ 99,999 (approx US$2,450), which is less than that of Tata Nano. However, due to new models in the market it is possible that this information may be incorrect.

The Tiny is battery operated, providing 1 km (0.62 mi) at 50-70 paise (₹ .50-.70).

Tara International projects the launch of three other versions of the car: Tara Titu, Tara Micro and Tara Mini., proposes to import 60-70% components from China and manufacture the remainder in India.

Specifications of Tara Tiny are as follows:

No of seats: 4
Net weight: 850 kg (1,874 lb)
Wheelbase: 2,150 mm (84.6 in)
Maximum speed: 50 km/h (31 mph)
Maximum grade ability: 15%
Motor power: 3 kW (4 hp)
Battery voltage: 6V*10
Recharge duration: 8 hours
Driving charge: 120 km
Ground clearance: 150 mm
Running cost: 40 paise/km
Battery capacity: 200 Ah

== See also ==
- Tata Nano
- REVAi
