= Crash Bandicoot =

Video game franchise

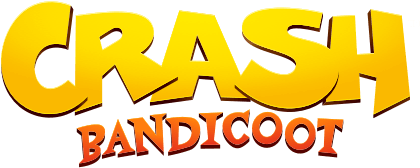
- Logo used since 2020
- Genre: Platform Racing Party Endless runner
- Developer: Naughty Dog (1996–1999); Traveller's Tales (2001–2004); Vicarious Visions (2002–2004, 2017); Radical Entertainment (2005–2008); Toys for Bob (2020–2024); Others: Eurocom (2000–2001); Cerny Games (2000); Dimps (2006); SuperVillain Studios (2007); Amaze Entertainment (2007); Tose (2008); Virtuos (2008); Polarbit (2008–2010); Beenox (2019); King (2021)
- Publisher: Sony Computer Entertainment (1996–2000); Universal Interactive (2001–2003); Vivendi Games (2004–2008); Activision (2008–present); Others: Konami (2001–2003); Vivendi Games Mobile (2006–2009); Glu Mobile (2009); King (2021)
- Creators: Andy Gavin; Jason Rubin; Charles Zembillas; Joe Pearson
- Platforms: PlayStation; PlayStation 2; Game Boy Advance; Xbox; GameCube; N-Gage; PlayStation Portable; Nintendo DS; Xbox 360; Wii; Symbian; iOS; PlayStation 4; Windows; Nintendo Switch; Xbox One; Android; PlayStation 5; Xbox Series X/S
- First release: Crash Bandicoot; September 9, 1996
- Latest release: Crash Team Rumble; June 20, 2023

Crash Bandicoot is a video game franchise created by Naughty Dog as a flagship title for Sony's PlayStation console. The series began with the development of the first game in 1994, inspired by the emerging capabilities of 3D consoles and games like Donkey Kong Country (1994). The protagonist, initially conceived as "Willy the Wombat", evolved into Crash Bandicoot, a goofy, genetically mutated eastern barred bandicoot who escapes the clutches of the mad scientist Doctor Neo Cortex. The original trilogy—completed by Cortex Strikes Back (1997) and Warped (1998)—along with the kart racing game Crash Team Racing (1999), received critical praise for their vibrant visuals and polished gameplay. After Naughty Dog's departure following Crash Team Racing due to creative exhaustion and ownership issues, the franchise transitioned from Sony exclusivity to multiplatform releases under multiple developers and publishers, including Universal Interactive, Vivendi Games, and Activision.

Gameplay centers on 3D platforming with a linear or hub-based level progression. Players control Crash through linear, obstacle-filled levels viewed primarily from a third-person perspective, with occasional shifts to a side-scrolling perspective and levels in which Crash flees a pursuing hazard by running toward the screen. Core mechanics include jumping, spinning to defeat enemies, and collecting Wumpa fruit for extra lives, alongside breaking crates for bonuses and gathering crystals, gems, and relics to unlock content. Later entries introduce abilities granted by defeating bosses. Set in a fictional archipelago with diverse biomes, and including time-traveling and multiversal elements in later games, the series features a cast including Crash, his sister Coco, allies like the protective spirit Aku Aku, and villains including Cortex, Uka Uka, and various mutant henchmen.

After a period of declining critical reception during the multi-developer phase in the 2000s and a hiatus in the early 2010s, the series experienced a successful revival beginning with the Crash Bandicoot N. Sane Trilogy (2017), a remastered collection of the original trilogy, followed by the remaster Crash Team Racing Nitro-Fueled (2019) and the new entry Crash Bandicoot 4: It's About Time (2020). Crash Bandicoot established Naughty Dog as a major video game developer and positioned the character as the PlayStation console's unofficial mascot. The series sold 40 million units across the series by 2007 and inspired merchandise, media adaptations, and scientific nomenclature.

== History ==
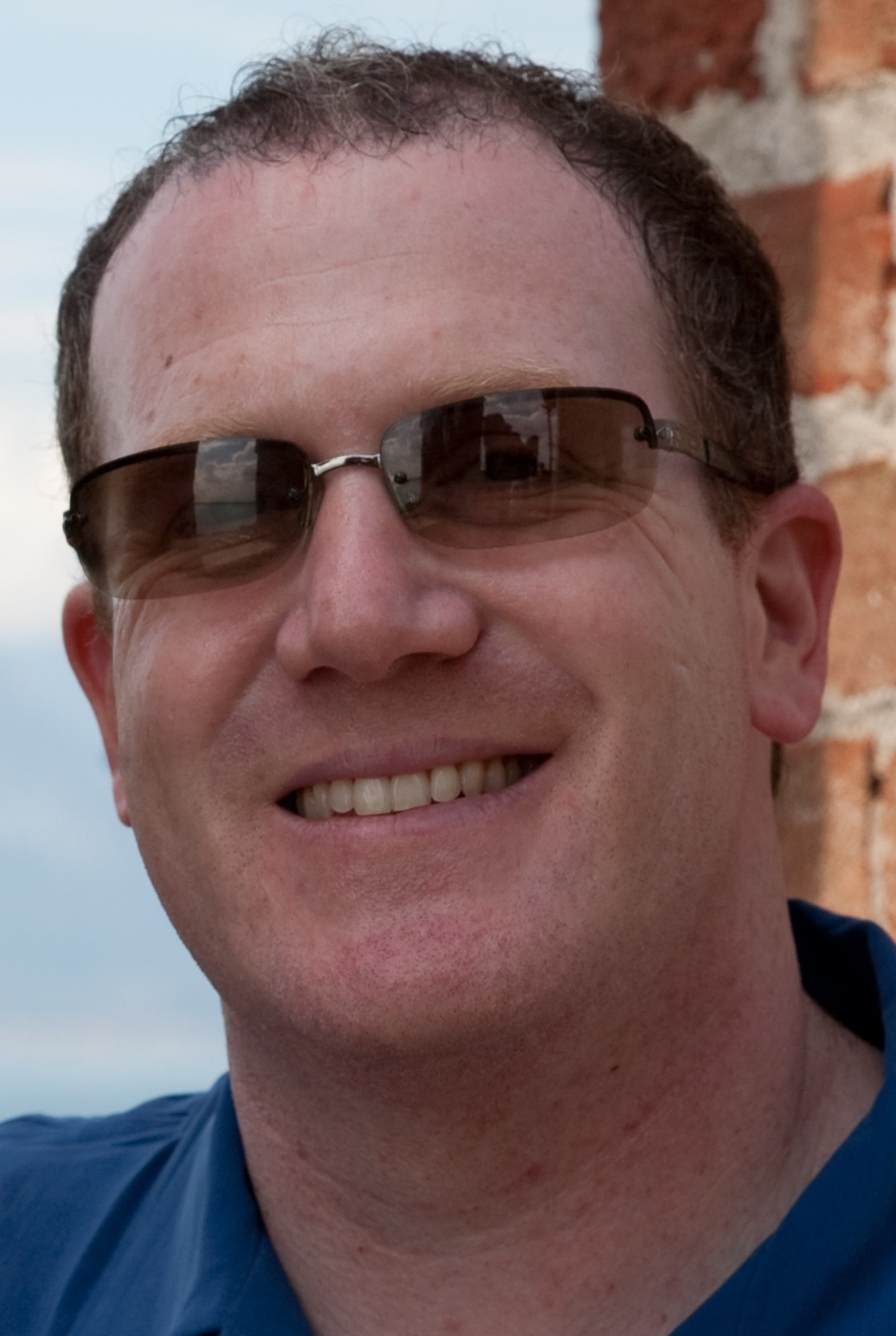
Andy Gavin (2009)

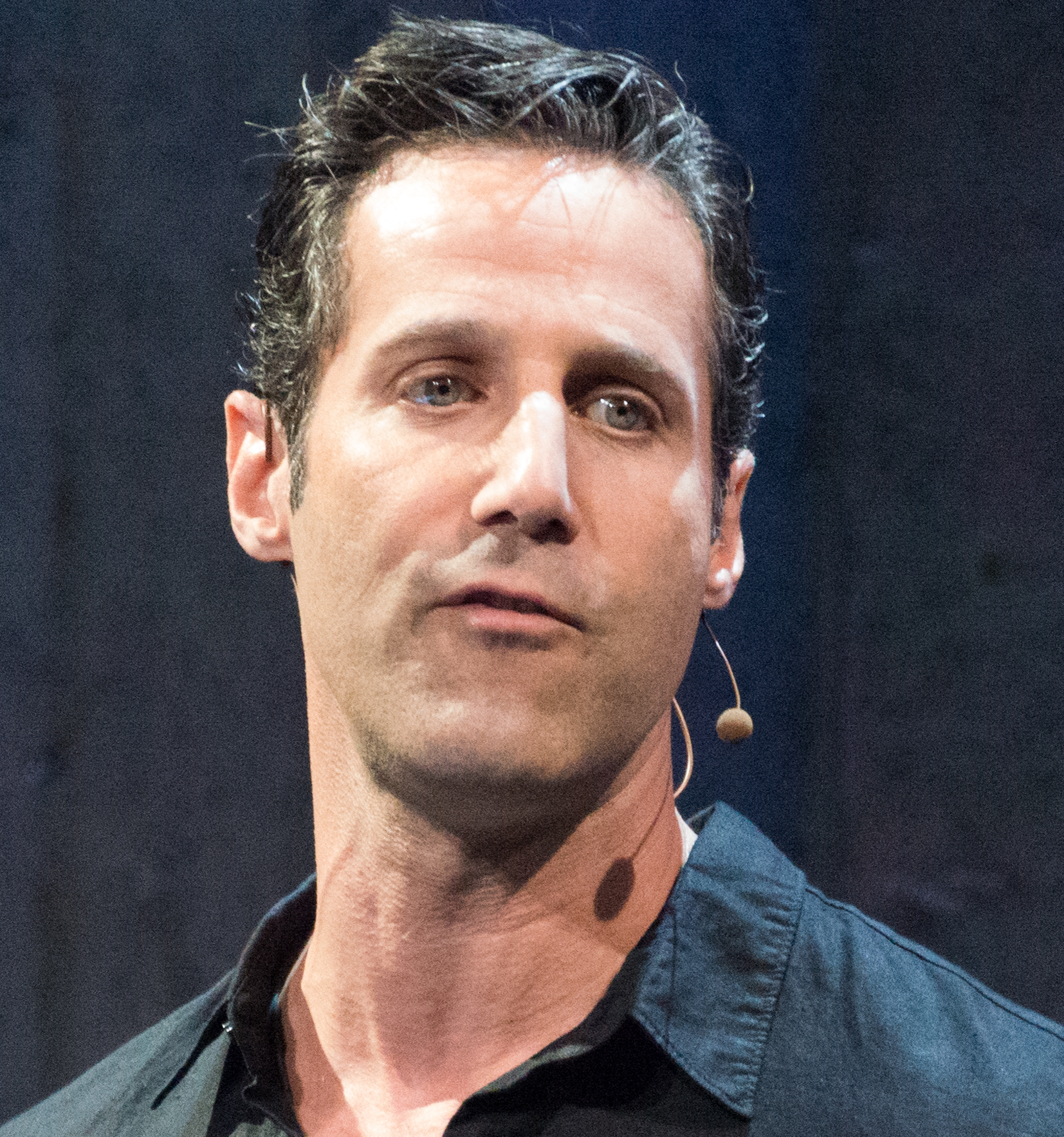
Jason Rubin (2015)

Crash Bandicoot co-creators Andy Gavin and Jason Rubin

=== 1994–1996: Origins ===
Naughty Dog was founded as JAM Software in 1984 by childhood friends Andy Gavin and Jason Rubin, their first project being the educational game Math Jam (1985). Their following titles were Ski Crazed (1987), Dream Zone (1988), Keef the Thief (1989), and Rings of Power (1992). After completing Way of the Warrior (1994), Gavin and Rubin relocated from Boston to Los Angeles to work with publisher Universal Interactive. During the trip, they decided to create a 3D platformer to capitalize on emerging console capabilities, drawing inspiration from the pre-rendered visuals of Donkey Kong Country (1994). The game would be developed for Sony's PlayStation, as the company did not yet have a competing mascot character.

Production of the new project began in October 1994. To create the characters and setting, Naughty Dog contracted cartoonists Charles Zembillas and Joe Pearson. The game's lead character was tentatively named "Willy the Wombat" and was envisioned as a goofy, Zorro-like Tasmanian marsupial. The character would ultimately become a bandicoot for the species' appeal and relative obscurity. During the game's production, Naughty Dog demonstrated the game to Sony Computer Entertainment to secure a publishing deal with them.

=== 1996–2000: PlayStation exclusivity ===
Crash Bandicoot was unveiled at E3 1996, where it quickly gained attention for its vibrant visuals. The game was released on September 9, 1996, and by the end of the year it sold over 1 million units worldwide. The game's sequel, Crash Bandicoot 2: Cortex Strikes Back, was released on November 6, 1997, and also performed strongly, selling 1 million units in the United States by February 1998. The third game, Crash Bandicoot: Warped, was released on November 3, 1998, and sold over 5.7 million units worldwide by 2002. Crash Team Racing, a kart racing game, was released on October 19, 1999, and sold 1.9 million units in the United States.

Crash Team Racing was the final Crash Bandicoot game developed by Naughty Dog; the developers, creatively exhausted and disenchanted with their lack of control over the Crash Bandicoot intellectual property, began development on Jak and Daxter: The Precursor Legacy (2001); during the game's production, Sony acquired Naughty Dog, with Universal retaining the Crash Bandicoot property. Crash Bash, a party video game developed by Eurocom, was the first game in the series made without Naughty Dog's involvement. It was released on November 8, 2000, and was the final Crash Bandicoot game to be released exclusively for a Sony console.

=== 2001–2006: Multiplatform transition ===
Release timeline
1996	Crash Bandicoot
1997	Crash Bandicoot 2: Cortex Strikes Back
1998	Crash Bandicoot: Warped
1999	Crash Team Racing
2000	Crash Bash
2001	Crash Bandicoot: The Wrath of Cortex
2002	Crash Bandicoot: The Huge Adventure
2003	Crash Bandicoot 2: N-Tranced
2003	Crash Nitro Kart
2004	Crash Bandicoot Purple and Spyro Orange
2004	Crash Twinsanity
2005	Crash Tag Team Racing
2006	Crash Boom Bang!
2007	Crash of the Titans
2008	Crash Bandicoot Nitro Kart 3D
2008	Crash: Mind over Mutant
2009	Crash Bandicoot: Mutant Island
2010	Crash Bandicoot Nitro Kart 2
2011
2012
2013
2014
2015
2016
2017	Crash Bandicoot N. Sane Trilogy
2018
2019	Crash Team Racing Nitro-Fueled
2020	Crash Bandicoot 4: It's About Time
2021	Crash Bandicoot: On the Run!
2022
2023	Crash Team Rumble

Following the end of Sony and Universal's partnership, Crash Bandicoot: The Wrath of Cortex was developed by Traveller's Tales and released on October 30, 2001. Crash Bandicoot: The Huge Adventure, developed by Vicarious Visions, was released for the Game Boy Advance on March 13, 2002, the first Crash Bandicoot game made for a handheld console. The game was followed by Crash Bandicoot 2: N-Tranced, which was released on January 7, 2003. For home consoles, Vicarious Visions released Crash Nitro Kart on November 11, 2003; a handheld version by the same developer was released simultaneously. Crash Bandicoot Purple: Ripto's Rampage, a crossover with Spyro, was released on June 1, 2004. Traveller's Tales's second Crash Bandicoot entry, Crash Twinsanity, was released on September 28, 2004.

On March 23, 2005, Universal Interactive, now Vivendi Universal Games, acquired developer Radical Entertainment, who released Crash Tag Team Racing on October 21. Japanese developer Dimps released Crash Boom Bang! (titled Crash Bandicoot Festival in Japan) for the Nintendo DS in Japan on July 20, 2006, with a North American release on October 10.

=== 2007–2015: Redesign and hiatus ===
Radical Entertainment's next Crash Bandicoot title, Crash of the Titans, was released on October 2, 2007. Crash of the Titans marked a departure from traditional platforming by introducing an emphasis on combat and a "jacking" mechanic in which Crash defeats and controls large mutants called Titans. The characters were also redesigned with a "punk" edge to realign the characters into a unified style as well as make them more modern and distinct from other cartoon characters. Handheld versions of the game for the Nintendo DS and Game Boy Advance were developed by Amaze Entertainment and released on the same date.

In December 2007, Activision announced its acquisition of Vivendi Games, including the Crash Bandicoot intellectual property, and the merger was finalized on July 10, 2008. The mobile kart racing game Crash Bandicoot Nitro Kart 3D was released by Polarbit on April 29, 2008, and Crash: Mind over Mutant was released by Radical Entertainment on October 7; a Nintendo DS version of the latter game was developed by Tose and released on the same date. The mobile game Crash Bandicoot: Mutant Island was released by Vivendi Games Mobile in July 2009. In February 2010, Activision laid off around 90 employees at Radical Entertainment, roughly half the studio's workforce, amid cost-cutting measures and project reevaluations. Following the release of Crash Bandicoot Nitro Kart 2 on May 27, 2010, the series went into dormancy.

=== 2016–present: Revival ===
The revival of the Crash Bandicoot series began with the announcement of the Crash Bandicoot N. Sane Trilogy at Sony's E3 2016 press conference, as well as Crash and Cortex's appearance as playable characters in the toys-to-life game Skylanders: Imaginators. The N. Sane Trilogy was developed by Vicarious Visions as a remastered compilation of the original three PlayStation games with updated graphics, recreated controls, and new content. The compilation launched exclusively on PlayStation 4 on June 30, 2017, before expanding to the Xbox One, Nintendo Switch, and Windows in 2018. By June 2024, the N. Sane Trilogy had sold over 20 million units worldwide. Crash Team Racing Nitro-Fueled, a remastered version of Crash Team Racing, was developed by Beenox and released on June 19, 2019. The game sold 10 million copies by June 2025.

Crash Bandicoot 4: It's About Time, developed by Toys for Bob, was revealed on June 22, 2020, as a sequel to the original trilogy that returned to 3D platforming and featured new mechanics provided by the Quantum Masks. The game was released for the PlayStation 4 and Xbox One on October 2, and for the PlayStation 5, Xbox Series X/S, Switch and Windows in 2021. Crash Bandicoot: On the Run!, an endless runner developed by King, launched globally in March 2021 for Android and iOS, and was discontinued on February 16, 2023. Toys for Bob's Crash Team Rumble, a 4v4 multiplayer game, was released on June 20, 2023. Following Toys for Bob's announcement of its impending spin-off from Activision, content updates ceased after March 4, 2024. A planned Crash Bandicoot 5 by Toys for Bob, which would have featured a crossover with Spyro, was canceled due to the commercial underperformance of Crash Bandicoot 4: It's About Time and Activision's focus on live service games.

== Gameplay ==
=== Mechanics and level progression ===
A Crash Bandicoot game typically features different third-person perspectives; while in most levels Crash moves into the screen (top), others feature side-scrolling perspectives (middle) or have Crash move toward the screen away from a trailing obstacle (bottom).

The Crash Bandicoot series centers on 3D platforming gameplay, where players control the protagonist Crash in linear levels filled with obstacles, enemies, and environmental hazards. Crash can move in all directions, and the controls do not change with his position. The majority of the games take place from a third-person perspective in which Crash moves into the screen. Certain levels are played from a traditional side-scrolling perspective, while other levels, in which Crash flees from a large obstacle such as a rolling boulder, angry polar bear or dinosaur require him to move toward the screen. Some levels involve Crash mounting and steering an animal that accelerates uncontrollably, requiring him to maneuver around obstacles and bypass enemies. Throughout the series, Crash commandeers a variety of vehicles, such as a rocket surfboard, jet pack, motorcycle and biplane.

Crash's primary maneuvers include jumping and sliding. His trademark ability is the spin attack, a cyclone-like whirlwind motion which can defeat enemies by launching them off-screen; knocked enemies can strike other enemies in their path. In games starting with Crash Bandicoot: Warped, Crash can earn new abilities by defeating bosses. Crash of the Titans and Crash: Mind over Mutant feature combat mechanics as well as a "jacking" mechanic in which Crash can mount and control large mutant enemies called Titans.

At a certain point within the levels, bonus areas are accessible via a platform bearing a question mark. In these areas, Crash must navigate to the end of the path while grabbing an assortment of collectibles. Dying in a Bonus area will not deplete a life, and results in the player respawning next to the Bonus platform within the level. In the original game, bonus levels are accessed by collecting tokens in the likeness of Crash's girlfriend Tawna, Cortex, or Cortex's assistant Doctor Nitrus Brio. Tawna's bonus rounds are easy and plentiful, and enable the player to save their game. Brio's bonus rounds are more difficult, featuring more TNT crates and requiring more precise jumps. Cortex's bonus rounds, of which there are two, are the most difficult, and grant Crash a key that unlocks a secret level.

The levels in the original Crash Bandicoot are presented in a linear progression on a map. Crash Bandicoot 2: Cortex Strikes Back introduces a series of five hub areas, each granting access to five levels that can be played in any order. Crash must retrieve a crystal from each level and defeat a boss to progress to the next hub area. This level progression system resurfaces in Crash Bandicoot: Warped, Crash Bandicoot: The Wrath of Cortex, and Crash Bandicoot: The Huge Adventure. Subsequent games showcase either a branching map (as in Crash Bandicoot 2: N-Tranced and Crash Bandicoot 4: It's About Time) or open-world exploration (as in Crash Twinsanity and Crash: Mind over Mutant).

=== Collectibles ===
Wumpa fruit is the primary collectible throughout the franchise, with 100 fruits granting an extra life; in Crash of the Titans and Crash: Mind over Mutant, Wumpa fruit is a means of restoring health, with golden versions granting an extra life in the former game and a permanent health upgrade in the latter game. The two games also feature orbs of magic Mojo, which is released by defeating enemies or destroying objects and accumulates to unlock ability upgrades for Crash such as extended spins, headbutts, or combo chains. Crash can be protected from enemies and hazards by collecting Aku Aku masks; collecting one grants a single-hit shield, two offer double protection, and three grant temporary invincibility. Crash Bandicoot 4: It's About Time introduces the Quantum Masks, which are used in certain areas and grant special powers such as time manipulation and gravity reversal.

Gems are rewarded if the player clears a level after breaking all the crates or by finding them in secret areas. Much of these gems are clear and colorless, while a small amount of colored gems can be found in special levels and can transport Crash to hidden areas. Several colored gems are featured in Crash Twinsanity, and unlock bonus content when collected. Crash Bandicoot 4: It's About Time increases the amount of objectives that can reward gems, which include collecting a certain amount of Wumpa fruit and clearing a level without losing more than three lives. Crystals, introduced in Crash Bandicoot 2: Cortex Strikes Back, are often an essential collectible, with one needing to be collected in each level to complete a game. Crash Bandicoot: Warped introduces Relics, which are earned through completing time trials. Relics are obtained by touching a stopwatch near the beginning of a previously completed level and speeding through the level as quickly as possible; sapphire, gold, and platinum relics are rewarded based on the player's performance. Crash Bandicoot 4: It's About Time features N. Sanely Perfect Relics, which are obtained by collecting all of a level's gems without losing a life.

Crates have served as a foundational element since the original game. Basic wooden crates require a single spin attack to destroy and often contain Wumpa fruit. Arrow crates augment Crash's jumping ability when bounced on. Crates with Aku Aku or Crash printed on them respectively grant an Aku Aku mask and an extra life. Metallic crates marked with an exclamation point change an element of the surrounding environment if they are struck. Checkpoint crates allow Crash to return to that point in a level upon losing a life. TNT crates detonate upon being spun into, but can be safely destroyed by bouncing on them, which triggers a three second fuse. Nitro crates explode immediately upon contact, requiring Crash to trigger a special crate to detonate them all simultaneously. Crash Bandicoot: Warped introduces "slot crates" that shift between crate types at an increasingly rapid pace and must be broken before they turn to unbreakable steel. Time trials feature "time crates", which freeze the stopwatch for the amount of seconds printed on their sides. Some crates are reinforced, requiring Crash to use a stronger technique such as body slamming to break them.

== Setting and characters ==
An assortment of characters from the Crash Bandicoot series. The left-hand side depicts (clockwise from top) Doctor Nefarious Tropy (female and male), Lani-Loli, Doctor Nitrus Brio, Kupuna-Wa, Doctor N. Gin, and Akano. The right-hand side depicts (clockwise from middle) Crash Bandicoot, Tawna, Doctor Neo Cortex, Aku Aku, Dingodile, Ika-Ika, Uka Uka, and Coco Bandicoot. Art by Nicola Saviori.

The Crash Bandicoot series is primarily set in a secluded archipelago 300 miles (480 km) west of Tasmania. The islands encompass diverse biomes such as sandy beaches and snowy terrains, and are littered with the remnants of the lost continent of Lemuria. The largest island is the lair of the villainous mad scientist Doctor Neo Cortex. Crash Bandicoot 2: Cortex Strikes Back establishes that the islands' ancient civilization built a series of "Warp Rooms" providing instant access to areas all over the world. The time traveling premise of Crash Bandicoot: Warped introduces prehistoric, medieval, and futuristic locales. Crash Bandicoot 4: It's About Time explores branches of the multiverse, depicting parallel dimensions and alternate timelines.

Crash Bandicoot is the central protagonist throughout the series. He is depicted as an anthropomorphic eastern barred bandicoot genetically engineered by Cortex in an attempt to create a general who would lead his minions to world domination, only to escape his creator's laboratory. Crash is characterized as a goofy and non-verbal "accidental hero"; Josh Nadelberg, art director of Crash Bandicoot 4: It's About Time, described Crash as "this dude who's always in the wrong place at the wrong time" who "just manages to get himself out of all these crazy situations in a heroic way, but he's not your classic hero". Coco Bandicoot, Crash's tech-savvy younger sister, is a key ally and occasional playable character. Introduced in Crash Bandicoot 2: Cortex Strikes Back as a supporting character who uncovers Cortex's scheme, her role expands in subsequent entries, becoming playable in select levels of Crash Bandicoot: Warped and fully integrated across all games in the remastered trilogy. Crash is protected and guided by Aku Aku, a floating wooden mask inhabited by the spirit of an ancient witch doctor. Tawna, Crash's girlfriend and fellow lab subject, is the damsel in distress of the original game; Crash Bandicoot 4: It's About Time features an alternate-universe variant of Tawna as a playable character. Crunch Bandicoot, introduced in Crash Bandicoot: The Wrath of Cortex, is a muscular, genetically engineered bandicoot created by Cortex to destroy Crash, but after his defeat, he defects to join the protagonists as an ally and playable character in subsequent titles. The Quantum Masks − consisting of Lani-Loli, Akano, Kupuna-Wa and Ika-Ika − are a group of extra-dimensional masks who appear in Crash Bandicoot 4: It's About Time and can grant Crash and Coco special powers.

Doctor Neo Cortex, the main antagonist of the series, is a mad scientist who seeks to achieve world domination through genetically enhanced soldiers. He initially collaborates with Doctor Nitrus Brio, the inventor of the Evolvo-Ray used to mutate animals, but their partnership eventually sours; the two reunite in Crash: Mind over Mutant and Crash Bandicoot 4: It's About Time. Uka Uka, the evil twin brother of Aku Aku, is the malevolent overseer of Cortex's schemes. He was imprisoned underground by Aku Aku for his destructive pursuits until the wreckage of Cortex's space station inadvertently frees him. Cortex's loyal henchman is Doctor N. Gin, an unhinged cyborg engineer who survived an accident that has left an unexploded missile in his head. Other minions of Cortex include Tiny Tiger, a hulking, savage thylacine, and Dingodile, a dingo-crocodile hybrid who wields a flamethrower; Dingodile appears as a playable character in Crash Bandicoot 4: It's About Time. Doctor Nefarious Tropy, a time-manipulating scientist, is introduced in Crash Bandicoot: Warped as a co-conspirator of Uka Uka and Cortex who creates the Time Twister, enabling temporal excursions. He returns as a primary antagonist in Crash Bandicoot 4: It's About Time, partnering with Cortex to exploit space-time rifts for multiversal domination before teaming up with his female alternate-universe counterpart. Crash Twinsanity introduces Cortex's niece Nina to the villain roster. She is equipped with bionic hands implanted by her uncle that can extend to grab faraway ledges. She later appears as a primary antagonist in Crash of the Titans.

== Other media ==
A short comic promoting Crash Team Racing was published in the Winter 2000 issue of Disney Adventures, written by Glenn Herdling and drawn by Neal Sternecky. Strategy guides have been published by Dimension Publishing, Prima Games and BradyGames, some containing interviews and lore expansions. In 2018, Dark Horse Books released the original developer's bible for Crash Bandicoot as a hardcover publication titled The Crash Bandicoot Files: How Willy the Wombat Sparked Marsupial Mania. An official art book for Crash Bandicoot 4: It's About Time, titled The Art of Crash Bandicoot 4: It's About Time, was published on October 26, 2020.

During the development of Crash Bandicoot, a pair of traditionally animated cutscenes were produced by Universal Animation Studios to serve as the game's intro and outro, as well as act as source material for a potential animated series if the game was well-received and commercially successful. The cutscenes were dropped after Sony Computer Entertainment picked up Crash Bandicoot for publication, as Sony desired to push the PlayStation's 3D polygonal graphics. The cutscenes were uploaded to YouTube by producer David Siller in 2015. Sega senior vice president Shuji Utsumi proposed the concept of a Crash Bandicoot film to a number of studios, but was declined. Crash is a recurring character in the animated series Skylanders Academy (2016–18), being transported from his own world into the world of Skylands. Unlike any of his other appearances, he speaks fluent English with an Australian accent, provided by showrunner Eric Rogers in the first season and by Rhys Darby in the third season. In January 2021, alleged test footage of a canceled Crash Bandicoot animated series produced with Amazon Studios leaked online. On October 27, 2025, Netflix was reported to be developing an animated series. WildBrain was initially reported to be involved with the project, but the statement was later debunked.

Merchandise generated by the Crash Bandicoot franchise includes a line of action figures produced by Resaurus tying into Crash Bandicoot 2: Cortex Strikes Back and Crash Bandicoot: Warped. The N. Sane Trilogy was promoted with various shirts, keychains, and other types of merchandise officially licensed from Activision with Numskull Product Design. Also tied to the N. Sane Trilogy was a series of vinyl figures by Funko, including retailer-specific variants of Crash and Cortex. In June 2023, a Crash Bandicoot-themed cosmetics bundle promoting the release of Crash Team Rumble was added to Call of Duty: Modern Warfare II and Warzone.

== Reception and impact ==
Aggregate review scores (home console games)
Game	Year	GameRankings	Metacritic
Crash Bandicoot	1996	80%	—
Crash Bandicoot 2: Cortex Strikes Back	1997	89%	—
Crash Bandicoot: Warped	1998	89%	91/100
Crash Team Racing	1999	92%	88/100
Crash Bash	2000	71%	68/100
Crash Bandicoot: The Wrath of Cortex	2001	(PS2) 70% (Xbox) 70% (GC) 63%	(PS2) 66/100 (Xbox) 70/100 (GC) 62/100
Crash Nitro Kart	2003	(PS2) 67% (Xbox) 66% (GC) 63%	(Xbox) 70/100 (PS2) 69/100 (GC) 66/100
Crash Twinsanity	2004	(Xbox) 69% (PS2) 66%	(Xbox) 66/100 (PS2) 64/100
Crash Tag Team Racing	2005	(Xbox) 68% (PS2) 68% (GC) 67%	(Xbox) 69/100 (PS2) 66/100 (GC) 66/100
Crash of the Titans	2007	(PS2) 72% (Wii) 71% (X360) 65%	(PS2) 70/100 (Wii) 69/100 (X360) 65/100
Crash: Mind over Mutant	2008	(PS2) 75% (Wii) 72% (X360) 62%	(PS2) 73/100 (Wii) 70/100 (X360) 60/100
Crash Bandicoot N. Sane Trilogy	2017	(PS4) 81% (XONE) 79% (NS) 77%	(PS4) 80/100 (XONE) 79/100 (NS) 78/100
Crash Team Racing Nitro-Fueled	2019	(PS4) 84% (XONE) 83% (NS) 82%	(XONE) 84/100 (PS4) 83/100 (NS) 80/100
Crash Bandicoot 4: It's About Time	2020	—	(PS4) 85/100 (XONE) 83/100 (PS5) 86/100 (XSXS) 86/100 (NS) 80/100
Crash Team Rumble	2023	—	(XSXS) 71/100 (PS5) 67/100

=== Critical commentary ===
The original Crash Bandicoot trilogy developed by Naughty Dog for the PlayStation was positively received, with aggregate review scores ranging between the 80s and 90s, and the games have since been considered some of the PlayStation's best. The first Crash Bandicoot title was praised for its graphics (said to be the fifth generation's best yet) and challenge, while its gameplay was regarded as standard if enjoyable and polished. Crash Bandicoot 2: Cortex Strikes Back was lauded for its gameplay improvements and vibrant graphics, which were described as among the console's best. Crash Bandicoot: Warped received acclaim for its gameplay variety and presentation, and has subsequently been considered among the best video games of all time. The kart racing game Crash Team Racing, Naughty Dog's final game in the series, was regarded as a highly polished entry in the genre that surpassed its inspirations Mario Kart and Diddy Kong Racing in some aspects.

In the following era of differing developers, the series saw declining critical reception, with aggregate scores typically in the 60s. Eurocom's Crash Bash, a party game, was said to lack depth or originality, but was considered an enjoyable multiplayer experience. Crash Bandicoot: The Wrath of Cortex, the first post-Naughty Dog mainline game, was regarded as a rehash of the formula established by the original trilogy, and was criticized for its fixed camera angles and long loading times. The Game Boy Advance platformers by Vicarious Visions were positively received for their hardware-pushing graphics, though were also deemed lacking in innovation. Likewise, their racing game Crash Nitro Kart was commended for its visuals but faulted for its failure to sufficiently expand on the design of Crash Team Racing. The crossover title Crash Bandicoot Purple was praised for its variety of minigames but criticized for its weak platforming, short length and underwhelming trading card feature. Traveller's Tales's second game, Crash Twinsanity, was commended for its humor and gameplay variety, though its uncooperative camera and formulaic platforming sections were criticized.

Radical Entertainment's first game in the series, Crash Tag Team Racing, was praised for its clashing mechanic, genre-blending approach and humor, while criticism went to its lack of depth, low difficulty, and the execution of its platforming elements. Crash Boom Bang!, a party game by Dimps, was derided for its dull and simplistic minigames and tedious board game designs. Crash of the Titans and Crash: Mind over Mutant, two platformer entries by Radical Entertainment, were met with mixed receptions; critics appreciated the jacking mechanic, visuals and humor, but the fixed camera was a recurring frustration, and the games were respectively undermined by repetitive combat and extensive backtracking. A pair of mobile racing games developed by Polarbit were received positively; Crash Bandicoot Nitro Kart 3D was praised its engaging gameplay and responsive controls, but faced criticism for lacking multiplayer features and occasionally simplistic visuals and track designs; Crash Bandicoot Nitro Kart 2 was praised for its visuals, track design and gameplay modes, but was criticized for unforgiving gameplay mechanics and lack of innovation.

The series' revival marked a return to critical favor. The Crash Bandicoot N. Sane Trilogy, a remastered collection of the original three games, was commended for its faithful yet visually improved recreation. The remaster of Crash Team Racing, Crash Team Racing Nitro-Fueled, was similarly praised for its recreation and presentation as well as its robust content. Crash Bandicoot 4: It's About Time, a new platforming entry, was praised for its preservation and refinement of the series' classic formula, implementation of new gameplay mechanics, and vibrant visuals and audio. The mobile endless runner Crash Bandicoot: On the Run! was met with mixed reviews, being praised for its presentation and accessibility but faulted for its repetitive gameplay, lack of challenge, and pervasive microtransactions. The online multiplayer game Crash Team Rumble also had a mixed reception, with reviewers highlighting its gameplay, map design and presentation but decrying its content variety, live-service elements and pricing.

=== Commercial performance ===
The Crash Bandicoot series achieved commercial success. Naughty Dog's four games in the series sold over 20 million units altogether worldwide by July 2000, and the series saw continued success into 2007, selling over 40 million units worldwide across all titles and grossing over $1 billion. By 2025, the Crash Bandicoot N. Sane Trilogy and Crash Team Racing Nitro-Fueled respectively added 20 and 10 million sold units to the series' figure. The mobile entry, Crash Bandicoot: On the Run!, garnered over 60 million downloads between its 2021 launch and the announcement of its closure the following year but generated only about $4 million in in-app purchase revenue.

Crash Bandicoot became the first non-Japanese game to sell over 500,000 units in the country. Cortex Strikes Back and Warped sold 1.3 and 1.4 million units in the country respectively, while the PlayStation 2 version of Wrath of Cortex sold 212,000 units.

=== Cultural legacy ===
The original Crash Bandicoot was a flagship title for the PlayStation, and the character became the console's unofficial mascot. The series established Naughty Dog's reputation in the video game industry, and they achieved further success with the Jak and Daxter, Uncharted and The Last of Us series. The success of Crash Team Racing in particular inspired a kart racing game boom in the early 2000s, with Jason Rubin noting that Naughty Dog was pitched wrestling-themed kart games twice by different publishers. The series has been cited as an influence on other games, including Rayman 2: The Great Escape (1999), Knack (2014), PsiloSybil (2024), and Antonblast (2024). Games that have drawn comparisons to Crash Bandicoot include Jersey Devil (1997), Super Magnetic Neo (2000), Walt Disney World Quest: Magical Racing Tour (2000), Donald Duck: Goin' Quackers (2000), Woody Woodpecker Racing (2000), Kao the Kangaroo (2000), M&M's: Shell Shocked (2001), Scooby-Doo and the Cyber Chase (2001), and Ty the Tasmanian Tiger (2002).

A parody of Crash Bandicoot plays a central part of the storyline of the Simpsons episode "Lisa Gets an "A"". A 1999 episode of the WB TV series Felicity features a storyline in which the characters Elena and Noel become obsessed with completing Crash Bandicoot: Warped. In 2014, paleontologists formally described an extinct Miocene-era bandicoot species from fossils at Australia's Riversleigh World Heritage Area, naming it Crash bandicoot in homage to the game's character. In 2017, the character's signature "whoa!" exclamation inspired internet memes incorporating his yelp into songs and video game music.
