= Crash Bandicoot: The Wrath of Cortex =

2001 video game

- Developer: Traveller's Tales (Note: Ported to GameCube by Eurocom Entertainment Software)
- Publisher: Universal Interactive (Note: Konami co-published the PlayStation 2 version)
- Director: Jon Burton
- Producer: Daniel Suarez
- Designers: Arthur Parsons; Jon Burton; James Cunliffe
- Programmer: John Hodskinson
- Artist: James Cunliffe
- Composer: Andy Blythe; Marten Joustra
- Series: Crash Bandicoot
- Platforms: PlayStation 2; Xbox; GameCube
- Release: October 30, 2001: PlayStation 2; NA: October 30, 2001; EU: November 23, 2001; Xbox; NA: April 16, 2002; EU: April 26, 2002; GameCube; NA: September 17, 2002; EU: November 1, 2002
- Genre: Platform
- Mode: Single-player

Crash Bandicoot: The Wrath of Cortex is a 2001 platform game developed by Traveller's Tales and published by Universal Interactive for the PlayStation 2, Xbox, and GameCube. It was first released for the PlayStation 2 in late 2001, and for the Xbox in April 2002; it was later ported to the GameCube by Eurocom Entertainment Software and was released in late 2002. It is the fourth main installment and the sixth overall in the Crash Bandicoot video game series, being the first of the series to not be released solely for a PlayStation console.

The plot centers on the appearance of Crunch Bandicoot, a genetically advanced bandicoot created by the main antagonist of the series, Doctor Neo Cortex, who has harnessed the power of a group of destructive mask spirits known as the Elementals. Crash Bandicoot and his sister Coco must travel the world and gather special Crystals that will return the Elementals to a hibernated state, and thwart Cortex's plans to use Crunch as a weapon for world domination.

Critical reception of the game was mixed, with many reviewers opining that the game recycled elements from its PlayStation predecessors with minimal innovation. The PlayStation 2 edition sold 1.56 million copies in North America, and the game qualified for various best-seller ranges, including the Platinum range for PlayStation 2, Xbox Classics, and Player's Choice on GameCube. It was released as a launch title for the Xbox Originals line of downloadable original-Xbox games for the Xbox 360's Live Marketplace service in December 2007.

== Gameplay ==
Top: In this level, Crash rolls along while inside an "Atlasphere". A menu at the top of the screen shows the number of Wumpa fruit collected, the current number of boxes broken (out of the level's box total), and the number of lives. Bottom: Another level. To Crash's left is Aku Aku, a sentient mask who protects Crash from damage. To Crash's right is a "?" platform, which leads him to a Bonus Round. Various hazards lie in front of Crash. An enemy scorpion patrols in front of the bridge, while an enemy bird hovers above a row of explosive Nitro crates on the far side of the bridge.

The Wrath of Cortex is a platform game in which the player controls Crash and Coco Bandicoot, who must gather 25 Crystals and defeat the main antagonists of the story: Doctor Neo Cortex, his new superweapon Crunch Bandicoot and Crunch's power sources, the renegade Elementals. Much of the game takes place in a "Virtual Reality (VR) Hub System" created by Coco to help Crash gather the Crystals. The VR Hub System is split up into five "VR Hubs"; initially, only the first VR Hub is available. Each VR Hub has five teleportation portals to different levels. The goal in each level is to find and obtain the Crystal hidden in the area. In some levels, the Crystal will be located at the end of a level or must be earned by completing a specific challenge. Most levels contain a "Bonus Platform" that leads to a special bonus area, where the player must navigate through a maze and collect everything in sight. Once a bonus area is completed, it cannot be played again unless the level is replayed. After completing all five levels in a VR Hub, a sixth teleportation portal to a boss fight with Crunch will appear. By defeating the boss, the next VR Hub will become available for play. When all 25 Crystals are collected and Doctor Cortex and Crunch are defeated, the game is won.

Besides Crystals, Gems and Coloured Gems can be collected for extra accomplishment. Gems are rewarded to the player if all of the crates in a level are broken open or if a secret area is completed. Coloured Gems are found in special levels and lead to hidden areas. "Relics" can be won by re-entering a level where the Crystal has already been retrieved. To obtain a Relic, the player must initiate the "Time Trial" mode and race through a level in the pre-designated time displayed before entering a level. To begin a Time Trial run, the player must enter a level and activate the floating stopwatch near the beginning of the level to activate the timer; if the stopwatch is not touched, the level can be played regularly. The player must then race through the level as quickly as possible. Scattered throughout the level are yellow crates with the numbers one, two, or three on them. When these crates are broken, the timer is frozen for the number of seconds designated by the box. As no lives are lost in the Time Trial mode, the level can be played through as often as the player desires. Sapphire, Gold and Platinum Relics can be won depending on how low the player's final time is. The first five Relics the player receives unlocks access to a secret level. Every five Relics thereafter open up another level in the Secret Warp Room. The levels in the Secret Warp Room must be won before the game can be fully completed.

Crash and Coco Bandicoot start the game with five lives. Crash and Coco lose a life when they are struck by an enemy attack or suffer any other type of damage. More lives can be earned by collecting 100 "Wumpa Fruits" or breaking open a special crate to collect a life. Crash and Coco can be shielded from enemy attack by collecting an Aku Aku mask. Collecting three of these masks allows temporary invulnerability from all minor dangers. If Crash or Coco run out of lives, the game is over. However, the game can be continued by selecting "Continue" at the "Game over" screen.

== Plot ==
=== Characters ===
Ten returning characters from previous Crash titles star in Crash Bandicoot: The Wrath of Cortex along with five new characters. The protagonist of the series, Crash Bandicoot, is a genetically enhanced eastern barred bandicoot who must defeat the antagonist Doctor Neo Cortex and his new superweapon. Coco Bandicoot, Crash's younger sister, is a highly intelligent computer expert with an interest in Hong Kong martial arts films, having developed a highly masterful ability of martial arts from being self taught. Aku Aku is an omnipotent witch doctor mask who guides and aids Crash and Coco in stopping the plans of Doctor Neo Cortex. Pura, Coco's pet tiger cub, serves a very minor role and appears only in the introduction of the game.

The main antagonist of the series, Doctor Neo Cortex, is a mad scientist who created Crash Bandicoot among other characters and now seeks Crash's elimination along with world domination. The controlling force behind Cortex's plots for conquering the world is Uka Uka, the twin brother of Aku Aku. Four recurring villains from the series serve minor roles in the game: Dr. N. Gin, Cortex's main assistant; Dr. Nefarious Tropy, a scientist who specialises in time travel; Tiny Tiger, a hulking and ferocious thylacine; and Dingodile, a dingo-crocodile hybrid armed with a flamethrower.

Five new characters in the series make their appearance in The Wrath of Cortex, of which the most important is Dr. Cortex's genetically enhanced superweapon Crunch Bandicoot, a bionic bandicoot created for the purpose of destroying Crash Bandicoot. Acting as Crunch's power source are the Elementals, a group of evil masks who control the elements of Earth, Water, Fire, and Air. The Elementals consist of Rok-Ko, a temperamental and rock-headed earthbending mask who controls earthquakes and landslides, Wa-Wa, a waterbending mask who controls thunderstorms and floods, Py-Ro, an easily perturbed firebending mask who controls volcano eruptions, and Lo-Lo, a joke-cracking airbending mask who controls tornadoes.

=== Story ===
Frustrated by their poor "track record for spreading evil", Uka Uka orders Dr. Neo Cortex, Tiny Tiger, Dingodile, Dr. Nefarious Tropy and Dr. N. Gin to devise a plan to eliminate Crash Bandicoot. Cortex reluctantly comes forward with the announcement of a previously secret "genetically enhanced superweapon of unbelievable strength", but reveals that it is missing a power source. Uka Uka then suggests using the Elementals, a group of renegade masks who had elemental power over earth, water, fire and air, and were used to ravage the globe. The Elementals caused earthquakes, floods, and an Ice Age many centuries ago until they were imprisoned by the ancients with the aid of special Crystals that put the masks in a state of hibernation. Cortex deduces that if they awaken the Elementals and harness their destructive power, they can bring his secret weapon to life and eliminate Crash Bandicoot forever.

Back on Earth, the world is suddenly terrorized by severe natural disasters, leading Aku Aku to realize that Uka Uka has released the Elementals. Aku Aku returns to Crash and Coco Bandicoot and alerts them of the current situation, disclosing that the only way to stop the Elementals is to imprison them once more with the Crystals, which have been scattered across the Earth. Using Coco's new Virtual Reality Hub System, Crash and Coco travel the world and gather the Crystals, fending off attacks from Cortex's superweapon, Crunch Bandicoot, and the Elementals along the way. However, by the time the Crystals have been gathered and the Elementals have been put in their hibernation state, Crunch's elemental powers have reached maximum capacity, forcing Crash to battle Crunch at full power in Cortex's space station. However, despite this, Crash defeats Crunch, which releases him from Cortex's control. Infuriated by this failure, Uka Uka attacks Cortex with a fireball, only to have it hit a vital part of the space station, which causes a chain reaction that results in the space station's self-destruction. Crash, Aku Aku, and Crunch escape and return to the Bandicoot home on Coco's space fighter ship, while Cortex and Uka Uka deploy an escape pod and end up landing somewhere in Antarctica, where Uka Uka furiously chases Cortex around a small ice floe.

== Development ==
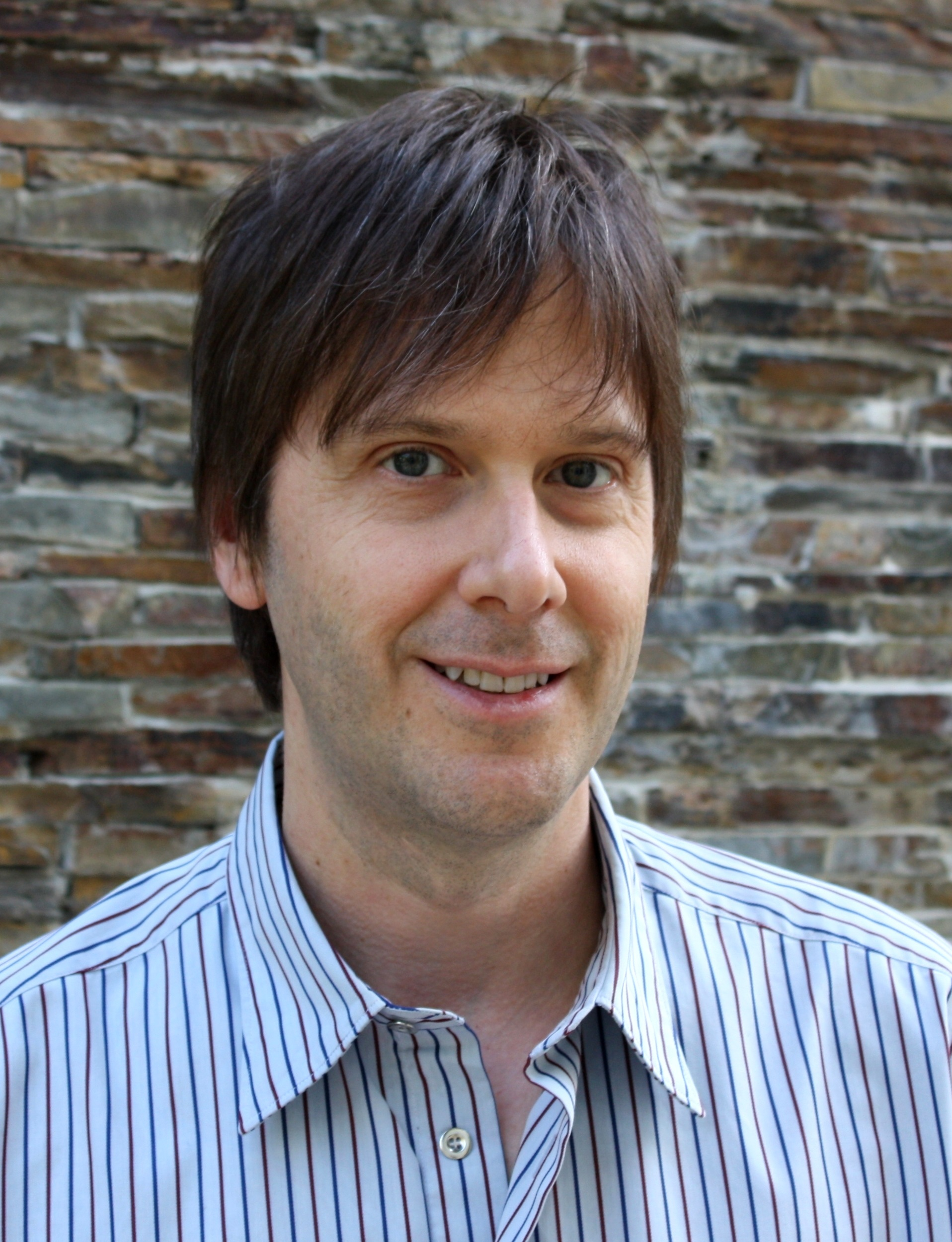
The game was originally intended to be designed by Mark Cerny as a free-roaming game

The Wrath of Cortex was originally intended to be designed by Mark Cerny, who had designed all the games in the series thus far, and published by Sony Computer Entertainment. The game under Cerny's direction was to be a free-roaming title with puzzle elements that would see Crash travelling between different planets. In early 2000, when Universal approached Traveller's Tales to be the development team behind the game, they produced a 3D rendered demo of Crash running through a volcanic level. Development of the game's engine began in mid-2000. It was originally titled Crash Bandicoot Worlds.

On September 21, 2000, Universal Interactive Studios and Konami announced that they had entered an agreement that would enable Konami to publish a Crash Bandicoot game for next-generation game systems, with Universal Interactive handling the production of the games. The agreement served to break the Crash Bandicoot franchise's exclusivity to Sony-produced consoles and effectively made Crash Bandicoot a mascot character for Universal rather than Sony. After Universal fell out with Cerny and Sony, Traveller's Tales was forced to alter the game from a free-roaming title to a standard Crash title. Traveller's Tales had to begin development of the game from scratch and were given only twelve months to complete the game.

The character Crunch Bandicoot was designed by Craig Whittle of Traveller's Tales and Sean Krankel of Universal. The concept of battling mini-bosses within the game's levels was dropped to uphold the fast and frantic pace of the series' gameplay. Multiplayer capability was also considered before being dropped. An earlier draft of the story featured an alternate version of the game's climax and ending, which involved Crash battling Crunch in a mechanical robot suit. At the end of the fight, Crunch would destroy Crash's suit with a bolt of electricity. The resulting debris would render Cortex unconscious, destroy the remote control device controlling Crunch and start an electrical fire in the space station. As the Bandicoots escape to resume their beach-going vacation, the ruins of the space station would crash-land onto the island of Cortex's original settlement, conveniently allowing Cortex and Uka Uka to resume their world domination bids.

The majority of the characters and vehicles in the game were built and textured by Nicola Daly and animated by Jeremy Pardon. The main game systems and game code as a whole were coded by John Hodskinson. The game's music is composed by Andy Blythe and Marten Joustra of Swallow Studios. A rearranged version of the original Crash Bandicoot theme by Mutato Muzika's Josh Mancell also appears in the game. The game's sound effects were created by Ron Horwitz, Tom Jaeger, John Robinson, and Harry Woolway of Universal Sound Studios. The game's voice actors were cast and directed by Margaret Tang with dialog editing from Rik Schaffer. Clancy Brown voices the dual role of Doctor Neo Cortex and Uka Uka, while Mel Winkler provides the voice of Aku Aku, and Debi Derryberry provides the voice of Coco Bandicoot. Corey Burton voices the returning villains Doctor N. Gin and Doctor Nefarious Tropy. Kevin Michael Richardson provides the voice of new character Crunch Bandicoot, while the Elementals, consisting of Rok-Ko, Wa-Wa, Py-Ro, and Lo-Lo, are voiced by Thomas F. Wilson, R. Lee Ermey, Mark Hamill, and Jess Harnell respectively.

== Release ==
The Wrath of Cortex was showcased by Universal at E3 2001, and was released for the PlayStation 2 on October 30, 2001. The Xbox version of the game was announced by Universal Interactive on January 31, 2002, and features reduced loading times and improved graphics. It was released in North America on April 16, 2002. On May 7, 2002, the company announced a GameCube version of the game, which was later confirmed to have connectivity to the Game Boy Advance. The GameCube version was released on September 17, 2002, initially in North America.

Commercially, the PlayStation 2 version sold over 1.56 million units in North America, and around 170,000 copies in 2001 in Japan. The PlayStation 2 version also received a "Double Platinum" sales award from the Entertainment and Leisure Software Publishers Association (ELSPA), indicating sales of at least 600,000 copies in the United Kingdom. As a result, the game was re-released for the Platinum Range on October 11, 2002, for the Sony Greatest Hits line-up on October 15, 2002, and for the Best line-up on October 17, 2002. The "Greatest Hits" version of the game features quicker load times than those of the original version. The Xbox version was re-released for the Xbox Classics line-up on April 11, 2003, and the GameCube version was re-released for the Player's Choice line-up in Europe on October 22, 2004.

== Reception ==
Reception

Aggregate score
| Aggregator | Score | | |
| Aggregator | GameCube | PS2 | Xbox |
|---|---|---|---|
| Metacritic | 62/100 | 66/100 | 70/100 |

Review scores
| Publication | Score | | |
| Publication | GameCube | PS2 | Xbox |
|---|---|---|---|
| Electronic Gaming Monthly | 6/10 | 5/10, 4.5/10, 4/10 | 5/10 |
| Game Informer | N/A | 6.75/10 | 7.25/10 |
| GamePro | 3/5 | 3/5 | 3/5 |
| GameSpot | 5.1/10 | 6.6/10 | 6.4/10 |
| GameSpy | N/A | 62% | 84% |
| GameZone | 7.2/10 | 8/10 | 7.1/10 |
| IGN | 6.9/10 | 7.4/10 | 6.7/10 |
| Next Generation | N/A | 2/5 | N/A |
| Nintendo Power | 3.3/5 | N/A | N/A |
| Nintendo World Report | 7.5/10 | N/A | N/A |
| PlayStation: The Official Magazine | N/A | 6/10 | N/A |

The Wrath of Cortex received "mixed or average" reviews on all platforms, according to review aggregator Metacritic. Reviewers felt that the game was a non-challenging repetition of the formula set by the previous games, with Ben Kosmina of Nintendo World Report summarizing the game's structure as "a carbon copy of Crash 3". Louis Bedigian of GameZone, however, declared Wrath of Cortex to be better than the preceding games, as well as the hardest game in the series, and welcomed the new levels, abilities and vehicles. The Atlasphere levels were positively received and commonly compared to Marble Madness, with Bedigian remarking that "Traveller's Tales could develop a whole game based on the sphere levels alone". The game's fixed camera angles and limited perspectives were said to result in frustrating trial-and-error gameplay. Bedigian and Mike Sabine of PlanetXbox found the controls to be sluggish. Sabine and Kosmina criticized Coco Bandicoot as an unnecessary inclusion that was harder to control than Crash. Hilary Goldstein of IGN went into further detail, dismissing Coco as "a less powerful and less enjoyable playable character" and saying "She's just not fun the way Crash is. Crash is a silly creature to look at. He's almost absurd, which works great with his various animations. Coco isn't really silly at all. The game isn't called Crash and Coco so why must I be forced to play her? Rather than add variety, Coco detracts from the only real selling point of the game -- Crash Bandicoot". Star Dingo of GamePro called the underwater levels "insidious" and suggested they be "used as an example in classes on how not to make a 2D shooter". Kosmina appreciated the GameCube version's GameCube – Game Boy Advance link cable support through the Crash Blast minigame. The long loading times in the PS2 version were widely criticized, and their reduction in the Xbox and GameCube versions was welcomed.

The graphics were positively received for their rich colour palette and increased definition and special effects from the previous games, but were generally seen as less impressive than those of competing games on their respective systems. The Xbox version was noted to have enhanced fur, lighting and particle effects compared to the PS2 version. Star Dingo also commented on the Xbox version's improved visuals, but considered the fur effects to be "creepy". Bedigian, while impressed by the graphics and effects, acknowledged that the visual style was conservative. Lafferty pointed out that the environments were less defined and detailed than other GameCube titles. Casamassina said that the presentation was sterile, elaborating that the environments lacked roundness and that the architecture felt empty. Goldstein was relieved by the reduction of slowdown and stuttering in the Xbox version and lauded the visuals as having the best use of colour on the system, but dismissed the enemy design as bland. Shane Satterfield of GameSpot singled out the game's underwater scenes as impressive. Matthew Gallant, also of GameSpot, and Andrei Alupului of PlanetPS2 deemed the graphics to be average, and Gallant was particularly disappointed with the opening sequence, which "has Crash water-skiing across a flat blue-and-white surface that approximates water much the same way "3" approximates pi". Randy Nelson of PlayStation: The Official Magazine considered the game to be "one of the best-looking titles on PS2 at the moment", but found the levels to be sparsely populated as a result of their increased width. The GameCube version was observed to suffer from framerate drops.

Sabine complimented the game's "quirky and playful" music as "fresh and lively". Bedigian was annoyed by Crash's voice, and considered "less than half" of the game's soundtrack to be worth listening to. Kosmina commended the audio as well done, and singled out the voice-acting for Cortex as "great", but criticized the poor looping of the music. Perry summed up the audio as familiar "thumping conga" music and "cartoony" sound effects. Lafferty described the audio as "fun, with a solid soundtrack and over-acted vocal characterizations". McElfish felt that the music was "consistently fresh and memorable" and the voice-overs were believable, but the sound effects were bland. Casamassina described the music as "well composed and catchy, with enough variation to keep you tapping your feet without realizing it", but criticized the voice-acting, which he felt was overdone and made some of the characters come off as annoying, and lamented the GameCube version's lack of Dolby Pro Logic support. Goldstein, while saying the audio was good in its own right, derided the Xbox version's surround sound mixing as sloppy. Gallant also criticized the sound mixing, and complained of a "loud, unidentifiable thunking noise" throughout the first vehicle-based level in the GameCube version. Alupului dismissed the music as "cheesy standard-fare cartoon stuff that sounds like it's done in primitive MIDI", and considered the voice-acting to be poor. Star Dingo described the music as "cool" and "rhythm-happy" and the celebrity voice-overs for the villains as "droll", but said the sound effects were uninspired. Kilo Watt, also of GamePro, said that the game's "bouncy" soundtrack was pleasant, but nothing new for the series. Mark Hamill's presence in the voice cast was noticed, with Alupului, despite not being a Star Wars fan, feeling sorrow for Hamill having been "relegated to doing voice work for mediocre video games".
