= Crash Bandicoot Nitro Kart 2 =

2010 video game

- Title screen
- Developer: Polarbit
- Publisher: Activision
- Composers: Gabriel Mann; Rebecca Kneubuhl
- Series: Crash Bandicoot
- Platform: iOS
- Release: May 27, 2010
- Genre: Racing
- Modes: Single-player, multiplayer

Crash Bandicoot Nitro Kart 2 is a 2010 kart racing game developed by Polarbit and published by Activision for the iOS. It is a sequel to Crash Bandicoot Nitro Kart 3D and the seventeenth installment in the Crash Bandicoot series. Unlike its predecessor, the game includes an online multiplayer mode.

Reception to Crash Bandicoot Nitro Kart 2 was generally positive, with critics praising the visuals, track design and gameplay modes, though it was criticized for unforgiving gameplay mechanics and lack of innovation. The game was the last in the series before a period of dormancy, which lasted until the Crash Bandicoot N. Sane Trilogy's announcement in 2016.

== Gameplay ==
An example of a race in Crash Bandicoot Nitro Kart 2. The player, in sixth place, is armed with a missile, a power-up that targets the racer directly ahead of the player.

Crash Bandicoot Nitro Kart 2 is a kart racing game featuring characters from the Crash Bandicoot series. Players race across 12 themed tracks, aiming to finish first while using weapons and power-ups to disrupt opponents. The game features both tilt and touch steering options, which can be toggled via the main menu. Acceleration is automatic, with players controlling braking (via touching the screen's bottom) and jumping (via touching the top). No reverse control is available. Players can collect weapons such as missiles to attack rivals. The game's modes include standard races, tournaments, eliminator (in which the last-place racer is dropped each lap), and mission (which features objectives like collecting items or drifting for points). Online multiplayer allows global racing with modes like standard races, eliminator, and collection (which involves collecting the most crystals by the end of a race).

== Release ==
Crash Bandicoot Nitro Kart 2, developed by Polarbit and published by Activision, was released on the App Store on May 27, 2010. Its soundtrack was composed by Gabriel Mann and Rebecca Kneubuhl; the two were members of the a cappella group Spiralmouth, who previously performed the music for Crash Twinsanity. The game was supported by price reductions until 2012. Following the game's release, the series went into dormancy until the announcement of Crash Bandicoot N. Sane Trilogy in 2016. By 2021, the game was unavailable on the App Store.

== Reception ==
Reception

Aggregate score
Aggregator	Score
Metacritic	77/100

Review scores
Publication	Score
Gamezebo	4.5/5
IGN	7.2/10
TouchArcade	4/5
AppSpy	4/5

Crash Bandicoot Nitro Kart 2 was met with "generally favorable" reviews according to review aggregator platform Metacritic. It made Kotaku's list of "Best Racing Game Apps", where it placed second among iOS apps, ahead of Fishlabs' Rally Master Pro but behind Firemint's Real Racing. In Pocket Gamer's similar list of "Top 10 Racing Games for iPhone and iPad", the game placed third, behind RedLynx's DrawRace 2 and Firemint's Real Racing 2.

The game's tracks were considered a highlight for their varied themes and progressively challenging designs. Jim Squires of Gamezebo praised their "gentle progression of difficulty", unique and lively track themes, as well as catchy music, noting they feel "smart" and engaging. Andrew Nesvadba of AppSpy described the tracks as "varied and fun to learn", though criticized the lack of practice options for individual tracks in tournaments. Jared Nelson of TouchArcade highlighted the "cleverly designed" levels with multiple pathways, varying elevations, and discoverable shortcuts. Levi Buchanan of IGN noted the "good" track design with shortcuts for risk-takers. Mitch Dyer of GamesRadar+ called the tracks "surprisingly well-designed", balancing simplicity for fast racing with complexity for strategic depth.

The graphics were said to be significantly improved over the original with colorful, detailed environments and character models. Squires lauded the "better visuals" and vibrant track themes, with each feeling "unique and alive". Nesvadba noted the improved graphics with a "streamlined interface" and more detailed characters, fitting Crash Bandicoot's aesthetic. Nelson highlighted the "detailed and brightly colored" scenery, improved character and kart models, and no draw distance issues, though mentioned the frame rate could dip during heavy action. Buchanan acknowledged fixes to the original's "choppy" graphics, with the new game delivering "lots of bright colors".

The addition of online multiplayer was deemed a major improvement. Squires called multiplayer the biggest improvement with seamless performance and no lag in dozens of races, though he noted that matchmaking occasionally placed players in ongoing races. Nelson praised the "incredibly easy" online play for its lag-free performance and varied modes, which added replayability. Buchanan described the multiplayer as "pretty good", while Dyer noted that despite its presence, the game did not push genre boundaries.

The game was commended for its robust variety of content. Squires highlighted the gameplay modes, calling the game "packed-to-the-rafters". Nesvadba cited the amount of modes and unlockable characters as a positive point. Nelson was impressed by the variety of modes, noting that some objectives are "brutally difficult". Buchanan recognized the mission mode for adding depth beyond standard races.

The game's rubberband AI and harsh penalties for mistakes frustrated reviewers for undermining strong performances. Squires criticized obstacles like the haunted house doorway, where players can get stuck without reverse controls, and overly harsh penalties for falling off tracks, though these issues were infrequent. Nelson highlighted the "highly unforgiving" gameplay, where one mistake or opponent attack can ruin a race, though he noted this can also enable comebacks. Buchanan strongly criticized the rubberband AI, calling it frustrating when rivals overtake on the final lap, and warning it may potentially alienate players.

Critics observed that the game adheres closely to kart racing tropes, offering little innovation compared to Mario Kart. Squires and Nelson compared the game favorably to Mario Kart DS, though Nelson acknowledged its reliance on proven formulas. Nesvadba noted it was a "familiar" title that improved on its predecessor but did not break new ground. Buchanan criticized its lack of originality, calling it a "basic kart racer" that does not stand out in a crowded genre. Dyer emphasized its nostalgic, conventional appeal, admitting it does not innovate the genre.
