= Real Racing 3 =

2013 racing video game

- Cover art featuring a Pagani Huayra and a Koenigsegg Agera R
- Developers: Firemonkeys Studios; Slingshot Studios
- Publisher: Electronic Arts
- Series: Real Racing
- Platforms: iOS; Android; Nvidia Shield; BlackBerry 10
- Release: iOS & Android: WW: February 28, 2013; Nvidia Shield: WW: July 31, 2013; BlackBerry 10: WW: August 28, 2013
- Genre: Racing
- Modes: Single-player, multiplayer

Real Racing 3 was a 2013 racing game developed by Firemonkeys Studios and Slingshot Studios and published by Electronic Arts for iOS, Android (including Microsoft Surface Duo), Nvidia Shield and BlackBerry 10 devices. It was released on iOS and Android on February 28, 2013, under the freemium business model; it was free to download, with enhancements available through in-app purchases.

The game is the sequel to 2009's Real Racing and 2010's Real Racing 2. Primarily due to the freemium nature of the game, it received less favorable reviews than its predecessors, although the gameplay remained generally lauded. The game features over 59 circuits at 28 real-world locations, a 22-car grid, and over 500 licensed cars from 52 manufacturers such as Mercedes-Benz, Audi, Porsche, Lamborghini, Bugatti, Ford, Bentley, McLaren, Chevrolet, and Koenigsegg. Unlike in the previous Real Racing games, players are required to maintain and service their vehicles, requiring in-game cash and real-world time. Over time and despite an expensive virtual economy ingame, the developers began to tolerate the use of changing time zones in order for the players to watch unlimited ads to get free gold.

After twelve years of providing services, Electronic Arts decided to discontinue support for the game. The game was taken off iOS and Android app stores on December 18, 2025 and servers shut down on March 20, 2026.

== Gameplay ==
At the start of the game, the player starts with a Porsche 911 GT3 (2021) as their starting car. The player begins the game at driver level 0 and increases levels by earning "fame points" (similar to experience) based on performance. Gold Coins, the premium in-game currency, are rewarded at each level up. Depending on the number of fame points required to reach the new level, the game rewards from 5 to 100 gold coins. The game as a whole is divided into multiple series, each series is further subdivided into several tiers, and each tier into one to three individual races.

- Series: There are over 550 series in the game, and only certain cars can be used in any given series. Most series allow the use of 3-5 cars, although some only allow one car (for example, AWD Attack has the Hyundai i20 WRC as the only car), or up to 13. When the game was first released, a series became available for play immediately when the player purchased one of the cars usable in that series. As of update 1.2 (July 2013), a series must be unlocked by winning a certain number of trophies in a previous series. Any car that is allowed in a given series can be used in any race within that series, with exception of "showcase" races, where only one specific car may be used. This means most series cannot be completed to 100% unless the player has purchased all usable cars for that series, although the vast majority of cars can be used in more than one series. Upon finishing 25%, 50%, 75% and 100% of a series, R$ or M$ and Gold Coins are awarded to the player. To achieve 100% completion of a series, the player must earn a gold trophy in every event of the series (by finishing first in every event) and complete every Time Trial event without going off-track or colliding into any barriers.
- Tiers: Every series is divided into about 5 to 22 tiers, all of which contain one to three races. Upon entering a particular series, only one tier is available, although once a tier is unlocked all races within that tier are available for play. More tiers are unlocked as the player earns bronze, silver and gold trophies in the races of a previous tier, or can be unlocked by use of in-game currency or gold coins. In the first tier of every series, the cars in the series are loaned for free (this only applies to the main series, NOT the bonus series).
- Unlike in the previous Real Racing games, players are required to maintain and service their vehicles; if the player does not perform such maintenance, the car's performance will suffer some at first, then drastically. Performing maintenance and upgrades requires in-game cash and also takes up real-world time, often up to several hours, depending on the car being serviced.

There are three types of currency in the game: "Race Dollars" (referred to as "R$"), Gold Coins, and "Motorsports Dollars" (referred to as M$). R$ is earned mainly by completing races in the Road Collection Series by completing events, races, and so on. Gold coins are earned only by finishing each quarter of a series, advancing to a higher driver level, completing Game Center/Google Play Games achievements (as of update 2.1), by watching five seconds to one minute advertisements available in-game, collecting daily bonuses every day, completing partner offers, or competing in weekly time trials and multiplayer events. R$ can be used to purchase new cars, buy upgrades, and pay for maintenance. Gold Coins as well as 29,500M$ can be used by the player to instantly finish maintenance, deliver newly purchased cars without waiting, unlock new tiers, instantly unlock cars, buy upgrades, customize cars, and purchase cars that are not available through R$. The player can purchase R$, gold coins, and M$ with real-world money in the game if they wish.

A significant component of the game is that the player must wait for maintenance and the "delivery" of newly purchased cars. From the announcement of this aspect of the game, it was a controversial topic, although it does further reinforce the real component of the game. When a player races, if they race hard, go off track, or hit other cars, their car is damaged, and is in need of maintenance. Eventually, the car will deteriorate to the point that it begins to under-perform. At this stage, the player must get the car serviced, which can take up to several hours in real-time. This time can be reduced by spending gold coins, which are much rarer in the game than R$, unless the player is willing to spend real money on them in the in-app store, or by watching advertisements. This freemium nature sparked backlash from "hardcore" fans. In response to negative fan feedback and bad press, EA and Firemonkeys tweaked the repair times in update 1.1 so that damage was repaired instantly whereas maintenance times became significantly shorter, although could still only be bypassed completely with the use of gold coins. As of update 1.2, repairs were removed from the game altogether, with cars now requiring maintenance only, although maintenance can still only be bypassed by gold. In update 4.0, watching ads to reduce maintenance or reduce upgrade times was introduced.

Introduced in update 1.2 in July 2013, Drive points are required for the player to participate in time trials. Each race costs one Drive point. The player begins with three Drive points, and can only increase their maximum available Drive points to five by using gold coins. When the player runs out of drive points, they can use two gold coins to get a full refill or simply wait until the game automatically replenishes the points (one point is replenished every eighteen minutes).

Introduced in update 1.3.5 in September 2013, VIP service is an option available for every car in the game. Purchasing a VIP service for any car must be done through the in-app store and costs real world money, with each VIP service usable only for the car for which it is purchased. The VIP service removes any waiting times for newly purchased cars or upgrades purchased with R$. Usually, when a player purchases a new car through R$, they must wait several hours for that car to be 'delivered'. However, if they purchase the VIP service for that car, it will be delivered instantly upon purchase. The service works the same for upgrades. Any upgrades purchased with R$ take time to complete, however, if the player has purchased the VIP service, upgrades are performed instantly.

Introduced in update 1.4.0 in October 2013, crew members can be hired prior to each race. The player has the option to hire a Manager to earn double R$ for a first place win, an Agent to earn double fame for a first place win, and/or an Auto Engineer to maintain the condition of the car for a first place win. The player may hire no crew members if they wish, or all three. Each crew member costs one gold coin. From time to time, crew members offer their services for free. Gaining the attention of higher level crew members requires an increasingly higher driver level. Crew members will not bring a reward if first place is not obtained.

=== Controls ===
Controls in Real Racing 3 are similar to that of its predecessors. The player is given seven different control methods from which to choose: "Tilt A", chosen by default, features accelerometer steering (tilting the physical device to the left to turn left and to the right to turn right), auto accelerate and manual brake; "Tilt B" features accelerometer steering, manual accelerate and manual brake; "Tilt C" is the same as "Tilt B" but with the virtual gas pedal below virtual brake pedal; "Tilt C (Flipped)" is the same as "Tilt C" but with the virtual gas and brake pedals swapped in positions; "Wheel A" features a virtual on-screen steering wheel to steer, auto accelerate and manual brake; "Wheel A (Flipped)" is the same as "Wheel A" but with the virtual steering wheel on the right of the screen and the brake on the left; "Wheel B" features a virtual steering wheel to steer, manual accelerate and manual brake; "Wheel B (Flipped)"; "Buttons" features touch to steer (where the player touches the left side of the touchscreen to turn left, and the right side to turn right), auto accelerate and manual brake. Within each of these options, the player can modify the amount of brake assist and steering assist, as well as selecting to turn on or off "traction control". In Tilt A and Tilt B, the accelerometer sensitivity can also be modified.

=== Event types ===
A drag race in Real Racing 3. To maintain top speed, the player must shift gear before the tachometer enters the red.

Real Racing 3 features eleven different types of race; "Cup" (a basic race against nine to twenty-one opponents over several laps); "NASCAR" (rolling start race in NASCAR cars with up to 42 opponents, with drafting available); "Formula E" (basic race in Formula E cars with manual controls and brakes, players automatically lose the race if the battery runs out and the car comes to a full stop before crossing the finish line); "Elimination" (race against seven opponents, where the car in last place is eliminated every 20 seconds); "Endurance" (the player begins with sixty seconds on the clock, and must reach a certain distance before the timer runs out. Time is added, up to a maximum 90 seconds, for overtaking other cars and completing laps); "Head-to-Head" (similar to Cup but with just one opponent); "Autocross" (the player must complete a certain portion of a track within a given time); "Speed Record" (the player must reach a certain speed over the course of a single lap); "Speed Snap" (the player must complete a certain portion of a track, and must cross the finishing line at a certain speed); "Drag Race" (a two car drag race, with three opponents taking turns); "Hunter" (the opponent with a Nissan Silvia (S15) is given a head start against the player, and the player must try to reduce the gap and/or overtake the opponent by the largest amount by the end of the lap to win); "Time Trial" (the player must complete a lap as fast as possible without all four tires leaving the track or the car bumping into the walls; Time Trial events require Drive points unless the car is fully upgraded).

=== Multiplayer ===
When initially released, the game did not offer a "traditional" multiplayer mode (where people who are all online at the same time race against one another), it instead offered a type of multiplayer known as "Time Shifted Multiplayer" (TSM), a system invented by Firemonkeys. TSM works by recording the lap times of people in each race, and then, when the player goes online, the game itself recreates those lap times, i.e. AI opponents in multiplayer mode are actually emulating the laps raced by real people at another time. However, TSM has not been especially well received, with many reviewers lamenting the game's lack of a "normal" online mode. 148Apps said of TSM, "Real Racing 3 uses race times to generate AI controlled doubles that follow almost perfect paths for each race rather than mirroring their human creators' abilities, race lines, and skill. This means it's not really like racing against friends at all as the cars don't do anything other than follow a path at an algorithmically determined speed based on the recorded time and cars used by friends." Overtaking is far different than in normal modes, as if one is about to overtake someone, their car goes transparent, if the gap increases, the car ahead will lose its transparency. After the player has passed the vehicle, it will turn to normal. If someone overtakes the player, the car passing the player will become transparent, once they have passed the player, they will no longer be transparent.

As of update 2.0 (December 2013), however, a more traditional multiplayer mode was made available, for up to four players. Weekly multiplayer tournaments are also included, as are multiplayer leaderboards, via Game Center. In update 2.6, eight-player multiplayer with drafting was introduced.

=== Drafting ===
Drafting is available to selected races, especially the NASCAR and Formula 1 series. Drafting occurs when a car comes behind another and drafts at the bumper.

When there is a group of four or more in a single file line, that is called train drafting. It holds more speed than normally drafting with one car. NASCAR features side drafting. It was finally released in the NASCAR update in 2017.

In 2016, the developers made a mistake. All cars at every circuit had the ability to draft. The bug was finally patched during their major update in 2017.

== Cars and locations ==
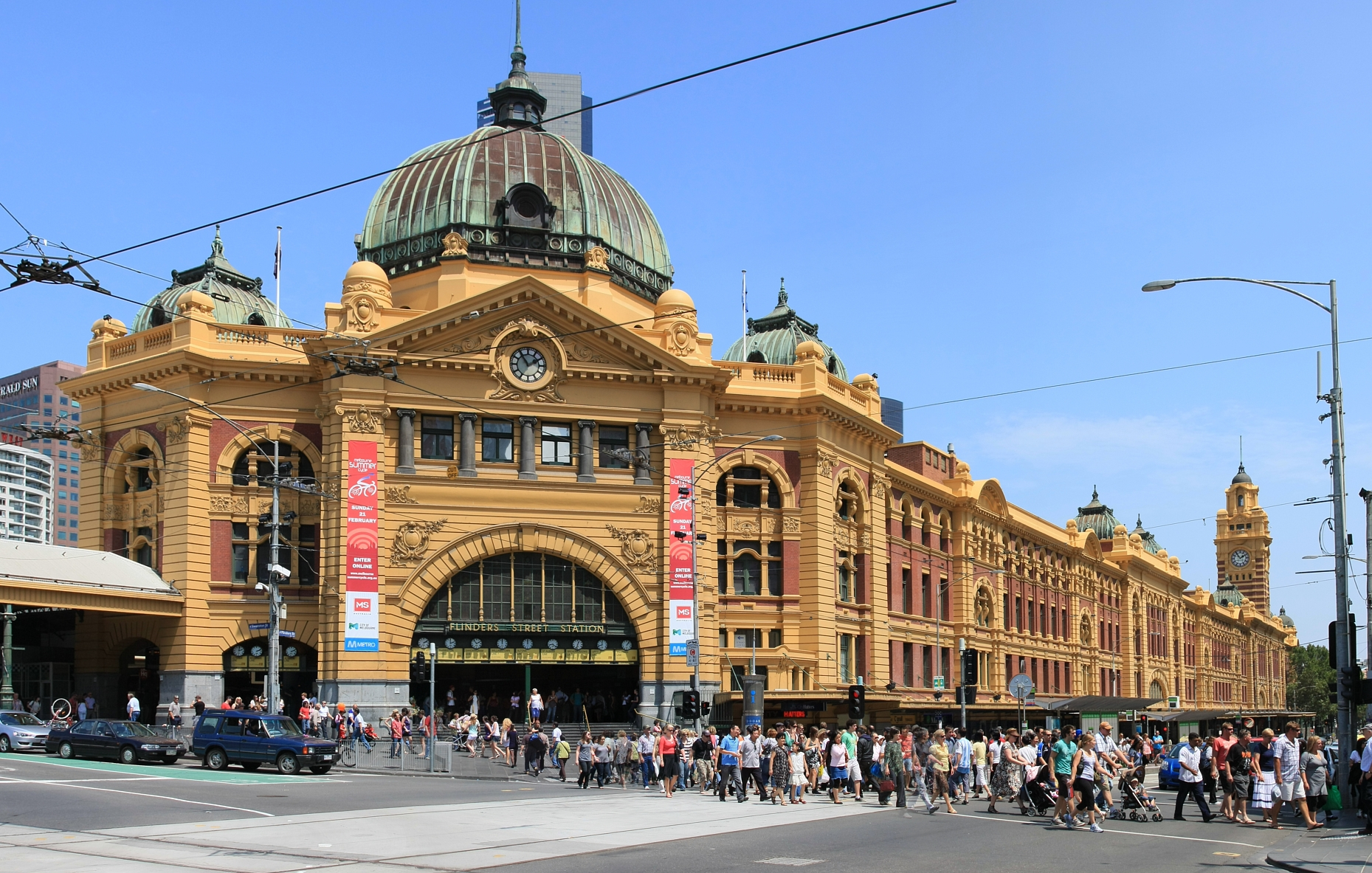
Besides taking place in various international racetracks, Real Racing 3 includes a fictional but geographically accurate racetrack based on Southbank, Melbourne, with the Flinders Street Station (pictured here) depicted as one of the landmarks.

=== Cars ===
The game features more than 500 officially licensed cars that are available to be purchased as of the final update 14.0 in December 2025, including Formula One, Formula E, endurance prototypes, world rally cars and so on. When the game was first released, every car was immediately available for purchase, with the only limitation being how much R$ or gold the player had. As of update 1.2, however, most of the cars must now be unlocked by winning a certain number of trophies before they become available for purchase. Cars purchased before the introduction of unlocks remain playable along with any race series that features that car; even if the player has not yet progressed to the point where they would normally be able to unlock them.

=== Locations ===
The game features a total of 58 racetracks based on real-life circuits, as well as a fictional street circuit set in Melbourne, located in Southbank.

== Reception ==
Reception

Aggregate score
Aggregator	Score
Metacritic	70/100

Review scores
Publication	Score
Edge	6/10
Eurogamer	3/10
IGN	9.1/10
Pocket Gamer	9/10
TouchArcade	4/5
148Apps	4.5/5
AppSpy	3/5
Macworld	3/5
Slide to Play	2/4
TouchGen	4/5

Real Racing 3 received mixed reviews. Critics praised the game's twenty-two car grid, its improved graphics and the addition of real-world tracks, but many were heavily critical of the game's freemium business model. The iOS version holds aggregate scores of 70 out of 100 on Metacritic, based on thirty reviews (compared to scores of 88 and 94 for its predecessors).

Eurogamer's Martin Robinson was extremely critical, scoring the game 3 out of 10. He praised the gameplay, graphics, sound, use of real world tracks, controls and the TSM system, but felt every positive aspect of the game was negated by the freemium model;

"At a time when the gaming world is finally comfortable with the idea of a triple-A mobile game, Real Racing 3 should have been a triumphant affirmation of a point made convincingly enough by the first game in the series. Instead, it's been strangled by the tentacles of gaming's next unconquerable: free-to-play. If games like Dota and Tribes are the warm, welcoming faces of free-to-play, then Real Racing 3 is the grotesque polar opposite, the snarling grinch that's the embodiment of every sceptic's worst nightmare. It's cynical, it's nasty and it's hard-wired into the very fabric of the game, making it totally unavoidable [...] There's a good game somewhere within Real Racing 3 – and there are plenty of free-to-play games that prove this model can work while respecting the player. Firemonkeys and EA have got that balance horribly, horribly wrong, to an extent where the business model becomes the game – with gut-wrenching results."

AppSpy's Andrew Nesvadba, while less critical, scoring the game 3 out of 5, also derided the in-app purchase system, which he called "all but impenetrable" and "designed to exact payment from the player over and over again." Macworld's Chris Holt also scored the game 3 out of 5. He praised the gameplay and graphics, but, like AppSpy, he was critical of the in-app purchase system; "EA has taken the air out of the tires of Real Racing 3's lightning quick gameplay, effectively turning one of the best iOS games on the market into a frustrating, stop-and-go test on your patience." Slide to Play's Shawn Leonard gave the game a rating of 2 out of 4, praising the game's visuals and gameplay, but criticising the freemium model, the TSM system, and the "painfully long" wait times. He wrote, "the reality is that Real Racing 3 is a high-profile business experiment gone wrong."

IGN's Justin Davis, on the other hand, awarded a score of 9.1 out of 10, and an "Editor's Choice" award, arguing that the game was an example of "freemium racing done right." Davis felt that the freemium model was aimed mainly at impatient gamers, as he had not spent any real-world money during his playtest, and noted that wait times became less odious once a player had several vehicles so they could race one while another was undergoing maintenance. He praised the integration of the freemium model, arguing that "Freemium games have to implement their business model in a way that doesn't unbalance the gameplay, and they have to have gameplay high-quality enough to be worth everyone's time to begin with. Real Racing 3 succeeds brilliantly on both counts." Edge scored the game 6 out of 10, and although they were critical of the waiting times, they also felt that the players' desires to avoid such waiting times added to the realism of the gameplay; "Firemonkeys has done an admirable job of folding those paywalls into the gameplay. Having to keep your car serviced to maintain peak performance strengthens Real Racing's sim aspirations, while the need to pay for repairs encourages more thoughtful driving and adds a real-world layer of peril to overtaking."

Rob Rich of 148Apps scored the game 4.5 out of 5, arguing that "the important thing to note is that Real Racing 3 is very, very awesome." He was critical of the TSM system, which he found "underwhelming", but he praised the graphics and defended the freemium model; "rather than create a paywall or punish frugal iOS gamers, Firemonkeys has created a much friendlier model in theory that ties all real time waiting and premium currency to maintenance and repairs." Pocket Gamer's Peter Willington was also impressed, scoring the game 9 out of 10 and giving it a "Gold Award", although he was critical of the TSM system, saying the game "lacks a real multiplayer mode."

TouchArcade's Eli Hodapp scored the game 4 out of 5. He praised many aspects, including the graphics, gameplay and presentation, but was critical of how integral to the experience of playing the in-app purchasing was; "everything in the game is better than its predecessors, except how much you'll need to fork out if you want to play it [...] Real Racing 3 is as much a waiting game as it is a racing game." TouchGen's Kevin Moore also scored the game 4 out of 5. He was especially impressed with the graphics and the range of races, tracks and cars. However, he criticized the TSM system and the freemium model; "Real Racing 3 is a great looking, great playing title which oozes slickness and class. It has a metric tonne of events to keep you playing, and is easily the best of its type on the App Store. Which makes the move to freemium feel like a cheapening of the brand."

During the 17th Annual D.I.C.E. Awards, the Academy of Interactive Arts & Sciences nominated Real Racing 3 for "Racing Game of the Year".

== Shutdown ==
On December 18, 2025, Electronic Arts announced that Real Racing 3's servers would shut down on March 19, 2026, making the game unplayable past that date. A popup with the same announcement was also shown in the game. On the day of the announcement, the game was removed from app stores, and in-game purchases were disabled.
