= Spy Mouse =

2011 video game

- Developer: Firemint
- Publisher: Electronic Arts
- Platforms: iOS, Android, Windows Phone
- Release: August 25, 2011
- Genre: Adventure
- Mode: Single player

Spy Mouse was a video game developed by Firemint for iOS, Android, and Windows Phone. The game was originally released in August 2011 by Electronic Arts. Shortly after being launched, it quickly became the most popular app on the iOS App Store. On May 4, 2015, this and many other old titles were shut down by EA. After the release of iOS 11, all 32-bit apps, including Spy Mouse, can no longer be opened and will prompt the user to uninstall it, and in late 2020, the servers for downloading the resources for SPY Mouse on Android were shut down. The game however can still be played as normal on devices with it pre-installed and on iOS 10 or earlier.

== Gameplay ==
Mr. Squeak, also known as Agent Squeak, is a spy mouse trying to get as much cheese as possible while avoiding various cats, who will chase or harm him if he is spotted. The player uses line-drawing (similar to the game Flight Control) to direct Agent Squeak through the levels. Players travel along a path by each building as they play each subsequent level. Cheese will slow the player down, causing them to be more vulnerable. If any one of the cats happens to catch Mr. Squeak, he will be defeated, and the player will have to start over the level or the part of the level they were on.

Players can use power-ups to help them, such as chili peppers, which increase speed, or balloons, which also increase speed by decreasing the weight of the cheese Mr. Squeak is carrying. The player can also use power-ups purchased from "Digger's Shop", which help the character get through the level more easily. To get power-ups purchased from the shop, they must use cheese they earned from previous levels they completed to pay for them. If the player does not have enough cheese, they can purchase it as an in-app purchase. One item in Digger's Shop is Kiska the Cat, an option that allows the player to skip a level and move on to the next one. However, this option does not award the player with any cheese they usually earn at the end of a level.

There are seven sets of ten levels, each taking place in a different "world". The first world is titled "Prologue". This world introduces the player to many elements of the game including cheese, cats, etc. The rest of the worlds each take place in a unique location: the suburbs, an area with many factories, a village filled with ninja cats, an inner-city, a town home to ghost cats, and a tropical area spiraling a volcano. Levels are each set in a different building or area. Sometimes levels have more than one part to them. Some levels have hidden areas, which can provide the player with score-increasing cheese crumbs, power-ups, or dossiers that reveal information about elements in the game. A few levels have hidden exits, that can cause a player to skip a level while still being awarded cheese. However, when a player uses a hidden exit, they must play a hidden level to move on to the next level. If a player draws a path on the map that does not go towards the main path where levels are located, they will unlock a secret level. At the end of each world, there is a boss where a player must follow a cat named Fluffy without getting spotted. In the second part, Mr. Squeak will have to defeat a cat or a cat-controlled machine to win the level and unlock the next world.

== Reception ==
The game has been rated 4.5 stars on Gamezebo and was listed as #4 on their Best iPhone Games of 2011.

On Touch Arcade, the game was rated 5 stars.

As of November 2012, the game has been rated 4.5 stars on the iOS App Store, and 4 stars on the Windows Phone Store by users, but the game has only been rated 2.9 stars on Google Play.

== See also ==
- Firemint
- Electronic Arts
- Flight Control (video game)
