= Niklas Lilja =

Swedish race driver

Niklas Lars Erik Lilja (born 22 November 1984) owns LMP Engineering AB. A workshop specializing in the Alfa Romeo 4C. He is also a factory test driver, race driver, drivercoach and race engineer. He was the lead factory test driver at Koenigsegg Automotive AB between 2016-2024. He set the land speed record for a production vehicle in 2017 with an average top speed of 277.87 mph (447.19 km/h) in a Koenigsegg Agera RS, as well as several related records.
