= Firemonkeys Studios =

Australian video game developer

- Type: Subsidiary
- Industry: Video games
- Predecessors: Firemint; IronMonkey Studios
- Founded: July 2012; 14 years ago
- Headquarters: Melbourne, Australia
- Key people: Robert Murray
- Products: Real Racing series Flight Control series
- Number of employees: 170 (2016)
- Parent: EA Mobile
- Website: www.ea.com/ea-studios/firemonkeys

Firemonkeys Studios is an Australian video game developer and publisher of video games, based in Melbourne, Victoria. In May 2011, Electronic Arts announced the acquisition of Firemint for an undisclosed sum, making it an in-house studio for EA Interactive. IronMonkey Studios were also taken under EA Interactive's wing back in 2010. In January 2011, Firemint acquired fellow Australian video game developer Infinite Interactive, best known for the Puzzle Quest series. In July 2012, Firemint announced a post on their blog that Firemint would merge with IronMonkey Studios by EA and merge their names into Firemonkeys. All-new games, including Need for Speed: Most Wanted and Real Racing 3, are released with the new company name.

== Acquisition ==
Electronic Arts, with a market capitalization of US$6.7 billion, announced the acquisition of Melbourne-based gaming studio Firemint overnight in a press release for an undisclosed amount. Firemint is recognised as one of the leading game developers on the iOS platform. According to Barry Cottle, General Manager of EA Interactive "The Firemint team is remarkable for its critical and commercial success. Having them as part of EA will accelerate our position as worldwide leader in game development for mobile devices and online gaming platforms." In January, Murray told SmartCompany the work-for-hire market is growing thin, especially as the Australian dollar continues to climb. Coming under the EA banner will give the company security.

=== Layoffs ===
In February 2019, Electronic Arts announced that 40 to 50 of Firemonkeys' 200 staff would be laid off, to focus the studio more on live services. This equals around 5% of the entire Australian game industries workforce.

In June 2023, Electronic Arts announced that a majority of the Firemonkeys staff would be laid off, to focus the studio more on The Sims FreePlay, as part of the company's restructuring. Development for the racing titles Real Racing 3 and Need for Speed: No Limits would be shifted to Slingshot Games in India, following the completion of two limited filler updates on the said racing games.

== Games ==
Firemint have produced a number of different games for different platforms and different publishers, starting with Nicktoons Racing in 2002 for the Game Boy Advance. For several years after publishing their debut game Firemint continued to produce and release games for the Game Boy Advance and mobile devices. It wasn't until early 2008, however, with the release of the Apple iPhone in 2007 did Firemint really expand their games market share. During 2009, Firemint developed their two most popular games, Flight Control and Real Racing. These games went on to achieve great success with the subsequent release of two sequels each, Flight Control HD in 2010, Flight Control Rocket in 2012, Real Racing 2 was released in 2010 and Real Racing 3 in 2013.

=== Released ===
Game	Platform	Release date
The Sims Mobile	iOS / Android	March 2018
Need for Speed: No Limits	iOS / Android	September 2015
Real Racing 3	iOS / Android	February 2013
Need for Speed: Most Wanted	iOS / Android	October 2012
Flight Control Rocket	iOS / Windows Phone	March 2012
Mass Effect Infiltrator	iOS / Android / BlackBerry 10 / Windows Phone	March 2012
The Sims FreePlay	iOS / Android / Kindle Fire / BlackBerry 10 / Windows Phone	December 2011
Spy Mouse	iOS / Android	August 2011
Dead Space	iOS / Android	January 2011
Real Racing 2	iOS / Android / Mac OS X	December 2010
Need for Speed: Hot Pursuit	iOS / Android	November 2010
Flight Control HD	PlayStation 3 / PlayStation Network	September 2010
Mirror's Edge	iOS / Windows Phone	April 2010
Flight Control	Nintendo DSi / DSiWare	February 2010
Real Racing	iOS	June 2009
Flight Control	iOS / Windows Phone	March 2009
The Simpsons Arcade for iPhone	iOS	February 2009
Back at the Barnyard: Slop Bucket Games	Nintendo DS	October 2008
Madden NFL 09 3D	Mobile	August 2008
The Fast and the Furious: Pink Slip 3D	iOS, Mobile	August 2008
The Sims DJ	iPod	June 2008
Project Joystick: Dung	Mobile, PC	May 2008
Nicktoons: Attack of the Toybots	Game Boy Advance	October 2007
FIA World Rally Championship	Mobile	September 2007
Madden NFL 08 3D	Mobile	August 2007
The Fast & the Furious: Fugitive	Mobile	June 2007
Ratatouille	Mobile	June 2007
Tinker Bell: Fly!	Mobile	February 2007
Need for Speed: Most Wanted	Mobile	October 2006
Madden NFL 07 3D	Mobile	August 2006
Socceroos: Path to Glory	Mobile	June 2006
Sopranos Poker	Mobile	March 2006
Snood 2: On Vacation	Mobile	August 2005
NBA 1 on 1 2006	Mobile	June 2005
Star Trek: The Cold Enemy	Mobile	February 2005
Black Rain: Revenge	Mobile	September 2004
Ryan Giggs International	Mobile	August 2004
Tokyo Fighter	Mobile	December 2003
Soul Daddy BKB	Mobile	August 2003
Soul Daddy in LA	Mobile	July 2003
Nicktoons Racing	Game Boy Advance	June 2002

== Awards ==
Firemint was awarded the Arts and Entertainment Award for being amongst the most successful exporters in 2009 at the Australian Export Awards in November.
