= Crash Bandicoot Nitro Kart 3D =

2008 video game

- Developer: Polarbit
- Publisher: Vivendi Games Mobile
- Series: Crash Bandicoot
- Platforms: Java, Symbian, iOS, N-Gage
- Release: Java, Symbian; April 29, 2008; iOS; July 11, 2008; N-Gage; January 6, 2009
- Genre: Racing
- Mode: Single-player

Crash Bandicoot Nitro Kart 3D is a racing video game developed by Polarbit and published by Vivendi Games Mobile. It was released for Java, Symbian, and iOS platforms in 2008, and on the N-Gage service in 2009. The game is the fifteenth installment in the Crash Bandicoot video game series, and was released on the App Store in Europe on June 9, 2008 and in North America on July 9, 2008.

The game was met with a generally positive reception upon release. Reviewers praised its engaging gameplay and responsive controls, though it faced criticism for lacking multiplayer features and occasionally simplistic visuals or track designs. A sequel, Crash Bandicoot Nitro Kart 2, was released in 2010.

== Gameplay ==
An example of a race in Crash Bandicoot Nitro Kart 3D. The player, in second place, is armed with a missile, a power-up that targets the racer directly ahead of the player.

Crash Bandicoot Nitro Kart 3D is a kart racing game in which the player control karts driven by characters from the Crash Bandicoot series across a selection of 12 (increased to 20 in 2009) tracks. Karts accelerate automatically, simplifying controls by removing throttle input. The iOS version utilizes tilt-based controls via the iPhone's motion-sensing accelerometer, allowing players to rotate the device like a steering wheel. The Java and N-Gage versions offer button-based steering with standard left/right turns and drifting turns. Players can initiate a powerslide by holding a designated button or tapping the screen in the iOS version, enabling tight corner navigation while maintaining speed. Tracks are littered with power-ups (e.g., bombs, missiles, oil slicks, shields, speed boosts) that allow players to attack opponents or gain advantages. The letters C-R-A-S-H provide bonuses and extras if amassed in a single race.

The game features a number of racing modes. Quick Race offers immediate races on unlocked tracks for fast play. The Cup mode involves racing across multiple tracks (typically four) in a structured tournament. The Story mode adds a light narrative, mixing up vehicle selections, opponents, and lap counts for variety, with objectives like targeting specific racers. In Time Trial, players race against their own best times (represented by a ghost) to set a personal record.

== Release ==
Crash Bandicoot Nitro Kart 3D, developed by Polarbit, launched for Java and Symbian platforms on April 29, 2008. The European release was helped by a marketing campaign with contests that had prizes modeled after Australia, and funded wireless application protocol advertising banners across several mobile entertainment sites. Vivendi also organized Crash Bandicoot Grand Prix in certain parts of Europe, where selected fans and key players from the video game industry got a chance to play against each other in kart tournaments.

The game was released on the App Store on July 11, 2008. The game was later released for the N-Gage service on January 6, 2009, with exclusive tracks included. The N-Gage version was one of the last games published by Vivendi Games Mobile before its closure in November 2008. By April 2009, the game was the highest-selling paid application on the App Store. By 2021, the game was unavailable on the App Store.

== Reception ==
Reception

Review scores
Publication	Score
IGN	iOS: 7.8/10
Macworld	iOS: 3.5/5
Pocket Gamer	iOS: 4.5/5; MOB: 4/5; N-G: 3.5/5
AppSpy	iOS: 4/5

Crash Bandicoot Nitro Kart 3D was met with generally positive reviews upon release. Spanner Spencer of Pocket Gamer called the iOS version a showcase for iPhone gaming, competing closely with the racing game Cro-Mag Rally, and he noted the N-Gage version's casual appeal despite minor performance issues. Levi Buchanan of IGN declared it the best racer in the App Store, citing tight controls and ample content. Steve Hannley of Hardcore Gamer named it the best iPhone racing game, highlighting its Mario Kart-like sense of fun. Joe Rybicki of Electronic Gaming Monthly deemed the premise standard, but was surprised by the quality of the motion controls. Pocket Gamer's Keith Andrew, reviewing the Java version, praised its entertaining, Mario Kart-inspired package. Damian Chiappara of AppSpy and Chris Barylick of Macworld emphasized its fun and accessibility, with Barylick adding that the price tag was reasonable, though he noted its need for updates. GamePro included the game in their "9 Must-Play iPhone Games".

The game's controls were widely praised for their responsiveness and accessibility. Spencer lauded the iPhone's motion-sensing steering as intuitive and sensitive, enhancing the racing experience without obstructing the screen. Buchanan noted that the tilt controls were slightly better than those of competitors like Wingnuts Moto Racer, with powersliding requiring practice but becoming rewarding. Hannley compared the controls favorably to Wii motion controls, emphasizing their responsiveness and lack of frustration. Andrew appreciated the Java version's drifting mechanics and dual steering options, which added skill-based depth despite the auto-acceleration. Chiappara and Barylick highlighted the simple control scheme, making it accessible and immersive, though Barylick noted the lack of throttle control as a minor drawback.

The visuals were generally considered impressive, though some noted occasional crudeness or performance issues. Spencer praised the iOS version's "superb" graphics and "liquid-slick" visuals, emphasizing the quality of the code for fitting high-quality visuals into a small file. Reviewing the N-Gage version, he noted that the cartoony visuals reduced graphical strain, maintaining entertaining gameplay, though frame rate issues and jagged pixels occasionally appeared. Buchanan described the game as visually impressive with vibrant colors and well-designed courses, though he occasionally found the frozen character expressions "creepy". Chiappara found the visuals good but sometimes crude, not fully leveraging the iPhone's capabilities. Barylick acknowledged good graphics and physics but noted occasional frame rate stutters.

The game's audio was consistently praised for enhancing the fun and immersive experience. Spencer called the music "great", contributing to the game's polish. Buchanan described the music as "superlative" with "boppy themes" that never grated. Chiappara highlighted the fun sound, particularly Aku Aku's tribal noises. Barylick noted "better sound" as a strength.

Spencer and Chiappara lamented the absence of multiplayer, with Spencer suggesting it could elevate the game. Andrew noted that tracks became "tame" after repeated play and suggested more varied power-ups for a sequel. Barylick reported occasional crashes and lag, particularly with iPhone OS 3.0, and noted the lack of throttle control.

== Sequel ==
A sequel, Crash Bandicoot Nitro Kart 2, was released on the App Store in 2010, and was met with positive reviews.
