= Flight Control =

2009 video game

- Flight Control iOS icon
- Developer: Firemint
- Publisher: Namco
- Platforms: iOS, Nintendo DS, Wii, PlayStation 3, Windows Phone, OS X, Microsoft Windows, iPad, Android
- Release: iOS; March 5, 2009; DSiWare: PAL: February 19, 2010; NA: February 22, 2010; PlayStation Network: EU: September 15, 2010; JP: January 27, 2011; Steam; November 18, 2010; Android; February 2, 2011; 4.0 / November 18, 2011; OS X 1.03 / July 21, 2011; WiiWare; August 18, 2011; Windows Phone; 1.2.0.0 / October 15, 2011
- Genre: Time management
- Modes: Single-player, multiplayer

Flight Control is a time management video game for iOS, Wii, Nintendo DS, Android, and Windows Phone 7 developed by Firemint and first released for iOS on March 5, 2009. The app was a number one bestseller on the App Store in 19 countries simultaneously on April 6, 2009 and has sold over 3.8 million copies. The development and publishing of Flight Control on non-Apple mobile phones is being handled by Namco under license.

An HD version of the game called Flight Control HD was released for the iPad in March 2010 and for the PlayStation 3 on the PlayStation Network (supporting the PlayStation Move controller) on September 15, 2010. The PlayStation 3 version supports exclusive additional features including a stereoscopic 3D mode, 1080p resolution, four player co-operative multiplayer, as well as an exclusive new map, Metropolis, which features a day and night cycle. Flight Control HD was also ported to the Microsoft Windows and OS X operating systems and made available through Steam. These releases are similar to the iPad version aside from the addition of a new airfield. The Mac version was released via the Mac App Store on July 21, 2011.

In September 2015, the iOS version was removed for sale from the App Store.

== Gameplay ==
Players assume the role of an air traffic controller at an extremely busy airport. The airport features a runway for large red jets, a runway for small yellow planes and a helipad for blue helicopters. Players draw paths along the field to direct each aircraft to its designated landing zone. Each successfully landed aircraft scores the player one point, and as the player's score increases, so does the number of aircraft that will appear on the screen simultaneously. The game ends when two or more aircraft collide. Players receive a high score for the most planes landed, which can be uploaded to online leaderboards using Firemint's cloudcell technology as well as to those in the iOS Game Center. The 1.2 version update includes four additional types of aircraft and two new stages (a beach and an aircraft carrier). The 1.3 version update includes the use of Bluetooth to enable multiplayer via a second device. The 1.5 update includes a new Australian Outback map which includes airplanes from the Royal Flying Doctor Service that cannot be redirected.

Update 1.7, released on May 11, 2010, completely overhauls the graphical engine to add higher quality animations and more vibrant detail to the game. The 1.7 update extends the length of the title screen melody. 'Windy Airfield' is a newly added airfield which only allows the player to land planes on runways that face into the wind. The latest update brings the playable runway total to five.

== Sales ==
Flight Control has been the number one downloaded paid application in over 20 countries. It has sold over 3.8 million copies worldwide.

== Reception ==
Flight Control has received generally positive reviews. IGN gave the game 8 out of 10, praising its long lasting gameplay. Pocket Gamer also gave the game 8 out of 10, complimenting, "if you could put Flight Control in a needle, it'd be considered a Class A drug. That's how simple and addictive it is." Pocket Gamer awarded it Best Casual/Puzzle Game for iPhone in 2010. During the 13th Annual Interactive Achievement Awards, the Academy of Interactive Arts & Sciences nominated Flight Control for "Casual Game of the Year".

== Sequel ==
On March 15, 2012, Firemint, now a part of EA, released Flight Control Rocket.
