= Real Racing (video game) =

2009 video game

- Developer: Firemint
- Publisher: Firemint
- Series: Real Racing
- Platform: iOS
- Release: WW: June 8, 2009; Real Racing GTI: WW: October 22, 2009
- Genre: Racing
- Modes: Single-player, multiplayer

Real Racing is a 2009 racing game developed and published by Firemint for iOS. It was released on June 8, 2009, for iPhone and iPod Touch, and later a HD version was released for the iPad, which featured improved graphics to take full advantage of the iPad's capabilities. The game was a critical and commercial success, and has led to two sequels; Real Racing 2 in 2010 and Real Racing 3 in 2013.

== Gameplay ==
Real Racing gameplay

The player is given five different control methods from which to choose: Method A features accelerometer steering (tilting the physical device to the left to turn left and to the right to turn right), auto accelerate and manual brake; Method B features accelerometer steering, manual accelerate and manual brake; Method C features touch to steer (where the player touches the left side of the touchscreen to turn left, and the right side to turn right), auto accelerate and manual brake; Method D features a virtual on-screen steering wheel to steer, auto accelerate and manual brake; Method E features a virtual steering wheel to steer, manual accelerate and manual brake. Within each of these options, the player can modify the amount of brake assist. In Methods A and B, the accelerometer sensitivity can also be modified.

In career mode, the player begins with only one available race; a "Hatch qualifier", in which they must complete a single lap in under one minute fifteen seconds to qualify for the next race. As each race is cleared, the next race becomes available. The game is divided into four sections, determined by the type of car; "Hatch", "Sedan", "Muscle" and "Exotic". Each section is further divided into three levels of difficulty; "Class C" is the easiest, followed by "Class B", with "Class A" being the hardest. Career races can include up to five AI opponents.

Other ways to play include a quick race, open time trials (which are connected to online leaderboards using Firemint's Cloudcell technology), local multiplayer and online trial leagues. A six player online multiplayer mode is also available.

== Cars and locations ==
There are forty-eight different cars to choose from in the game, although with the exception of two Volkswagen GTIs, none are officially licensed. There are twelve different fictional tracks on which to race.

== Real Racing GTI ==
In October 2009, Firemint released Real Racing GTI. A limited edition free version of the full game, GTI was made in cooperation with Volkswagen as a way to promote their newly unveiled 2010 GTI model. The game featured only three tracks, and six selectable cars, all models of GTI. Originally conceived by AKQA, GTI proved very successful, with over four million downloads.

== Reception ==
Reception

Aggregate scores
Aggregator	Score
GameRankings	96%
Metacritic	(HD) 88/100

Review scores
Publication	Score
IGN	9/10
Pocket Gamer	9/10
148Apps	5/5
Appvee	5/5
Slide to Play	4/4
TouchGen	5/5

Award
Publication	Award
Slide to Play	Game of the Year (2009)

Real Racing has received critical acclaim. It holds an aggregate score of 88 out of 100 on Metacritic, based on four reviews, and 96% on GameRankings, based on six reviews.

IGN's Levi Buchanan gave the game 9 out of 10, saying "Real Racing is the best racing game on the App Store right now. It's [sic] lethal combination of unparalleled AI, exceptional visuals, and lively community features leave the competition choking on its exhaust fumes." Jeff Scott of 148Apps scored the game 5 out of 5, calling it the "best racer ever," with particular praise for the graphics; "the visuals are absolutely fantastic. Perfectly rendered and wonderfully smooth, this could be the best looking game we've seen yet on the iPhone." Appvee also scored the game 5 out of 5, saying it was "the most realistic racing game for the iPhone yet."

Pocket Gamer's Tracy Erickson scored the game 9 out of 10, giving it a "Gold Award" and calling it "an effervescent taste of simulation racing that is as classic as it is inventive [...] a sophisticated, focused game that hits the spot." They were particularly impressed with the graphics, which they said "are without question the best of any iPhone game yet. Real Racing establishes a lofty new standard in visual fidelity." Slide to Play's Joe Hunt scored the game 4 out of 4, saying "As ambitious as anything in the App Store [...] it's breathtakingly realistic in all aspects of its design and is easily one of the best games on the iPhone to date." The game would go on to win Slide to Play's "Game of the Year 2009" award.

TouchGen's Nacho Andrade gave the game 5 out of 5 and an "Editor's Choice" award, commenting that "Real Racing is the best racing game to hit the iPhone so far, bar none." They were especially impressed with the technical aspects of the game; "the graphics are great, but I think an even greater stand out is this game's technical prowess [...] During the game you will notice how quick everything is, the frame rate is very smooth with no slowdowns [...] The game is so well crafted it creates an experience you may not have thought possible on the iPhone." They concluded that "Real Racing is an unparalleled iPhone racing experience. Firemint has pulled out all the stops to give us one of the best titles we have ever seen for the iPhone."
