= Koenigsegg Agera =

Swedish mid-engine sports car

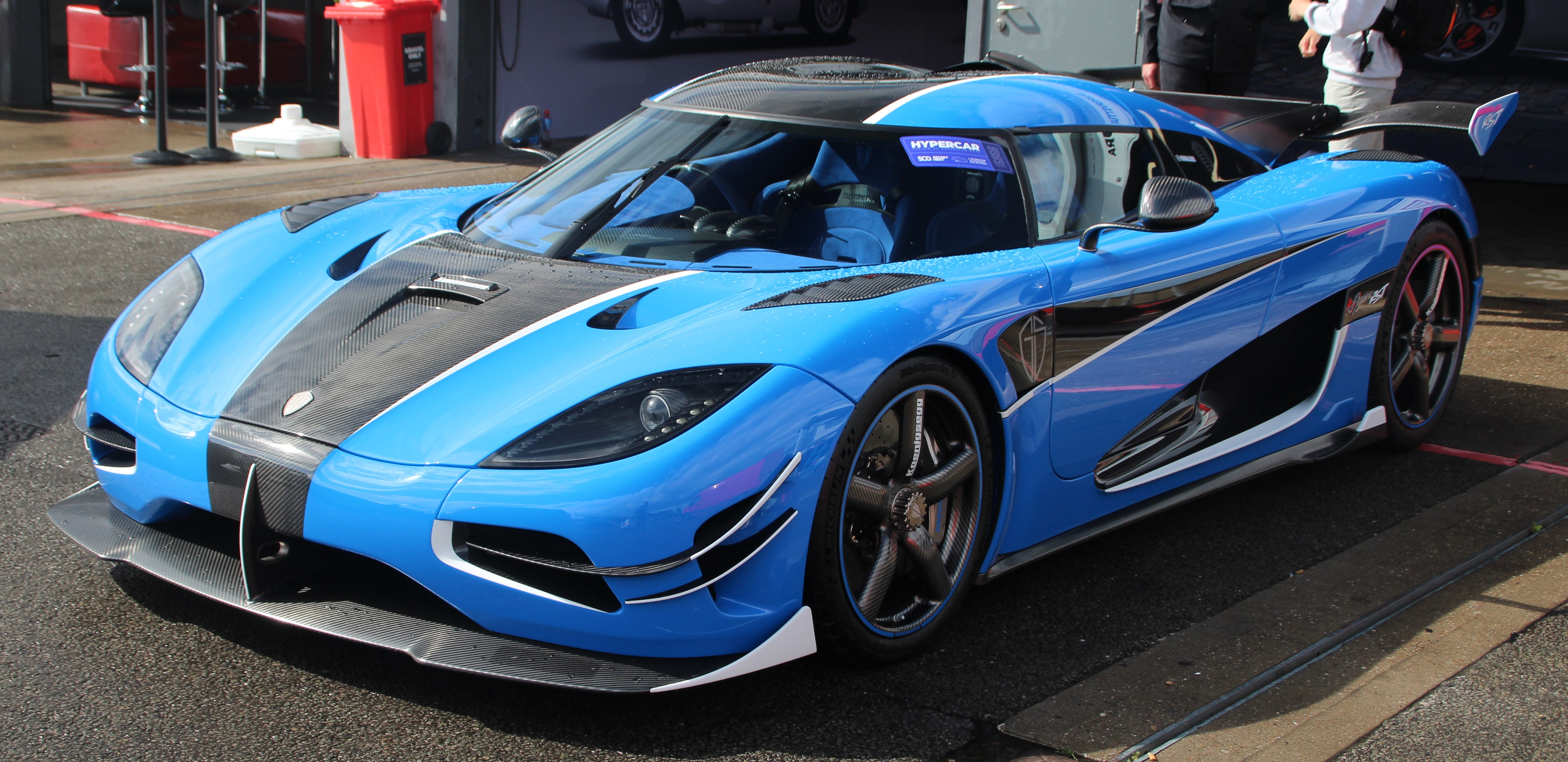

Overview
- Manufacturer: Koenigsegg Automotive AB
- Production: 2010–2018; 65 produced
- Assembly: Ängelholm, Sweden
- Designer: Christian von Koenigsegg

Body and chassis
- Class: Sports car (S)
- Body style: 2-door targa top
- Layout: Rear mid-engine, rear-wheel-drive
- Doors: Dihedral Synchro-Helix

Powertrain
- Engine: 5.0 L (305 cu in; 5,000 cc) Koenigsegg twin-turbocharged V8
- Power output: Standard: 706 kW (960 PS; 947 hp); Agera R: 706 kW (960 PS; 947 hp) on 93 Octane or 838 kW (1,139 PS; 1,124 hp) on E85; Agera S: 758 kW (1,031 PS; 1,016 hp); Agera RS: 865 kW (1,176 PS; 1,160 hp) or 1,000 kW (1,360 PS; 1,341 hp) 1MW option; One:1 / Agera Final: 1,000 kW (1,360 PS; 1,341 hp)
- Transmission: 7-speed dual-clutch

Dimensions
- Wheelbase: 2,662 mm (104.8 in)
- Length: 4,293 mm (169.0 in)
- Width: 1,996 mm (78.6 in)
- Height: 1,120 mm (44.1 in)
- Curb weight: Standard/Agera R/Agera S: 1,435 kg (3,164 lb); 1,330 kg (2,932 lb) dry; One:1: 1,360 kg (2,998 lb); Agera RS / Agera Final: 1,395 kg (3,075 lb); 1,295 kg (2,855 lb) dry

Chronology
- Predecessor: Koenigsegg CCX
- Successor: Koenigsegg Jesko

The Koenigsegg Agera is a mid-engine sports car produced by Swedish car manufacturer Koenigsegg and is a successor to the CCX/CCXR. The name comes from the Swedish verb 'agera' which means "to act".

It was named Hypercar of the Year in 2010 by Top Gear magazine. The Agera RS variant became the world's fastest production car in 2017, setting a record with a GPS-verified two-way average top speed of 447 km/h (278 mph) and a fastest straight-line speed of 458 km/h (285 mph).

The Agera ceased production in July 2018 with the unveiling of the two final edition cars at the 2018 Goodwood Festival of Speed. It was succeeded by the Jesko in 2019.

== Specifications and performance ==
=== Engine and transmission ===
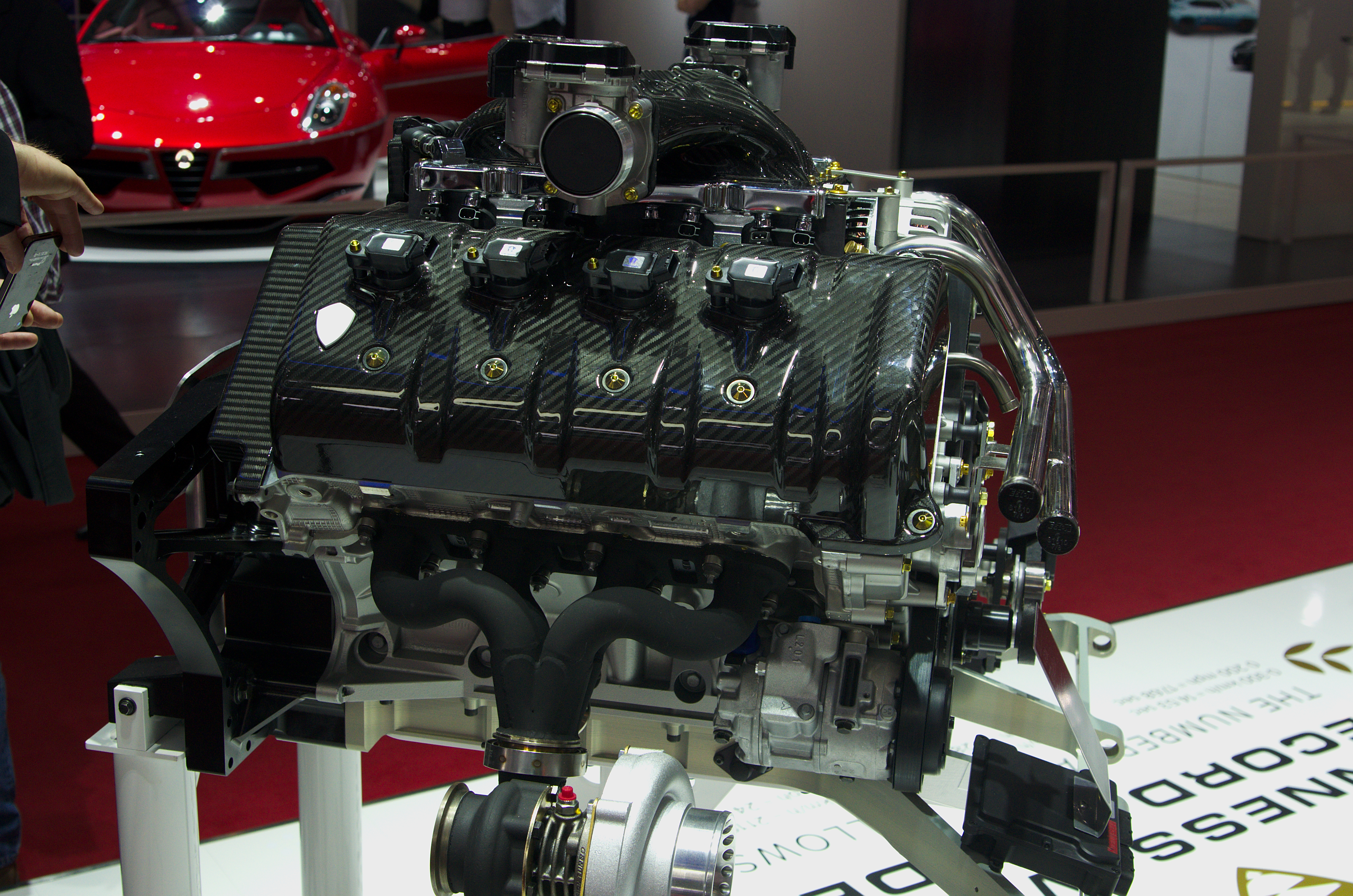
The 5.0-litre twin-turbo V8 engine

In early development, the car was fitted with a 4.7-litre V8 engine with fixed-vane twin-turbochargers, but the engine was replaced with an in-house developed 5.0-litre V8 engine and fitted with twin-turbochargers which generates a maximum power output of 706 kW (960 PS; 947 hp) at 6,900 rpm and 1,100 N⋅m (811 lbf⋅ft) of torque at 4,000 rpm. The total weight of the engine is only 197 kg (434 lb) due to a carbon fibre inlet manifold and aluminium construction. The transmission is a specially developed CIMA 7-speed dual-clutch with paddle shifters. It is the first dual-clutch transmission to feature only one input shaft. The second clutch slows down the input shaft during up shifts in order to reduce the time it takes to synchronise the next gear, resulting in faster shift times. Most notably, the transmission weighs only 81 kg (179 lb).

=== Performance (manufacturer claimed data) ===
- 0–100 km/h (0–62 mph) in 2.8 seconds
- 0–200 km/h (0–124 mph) in 8.0 seconds

The top speed for the production model is claimed to be 400 km/h (249 mph).

== Exterior and interior ==
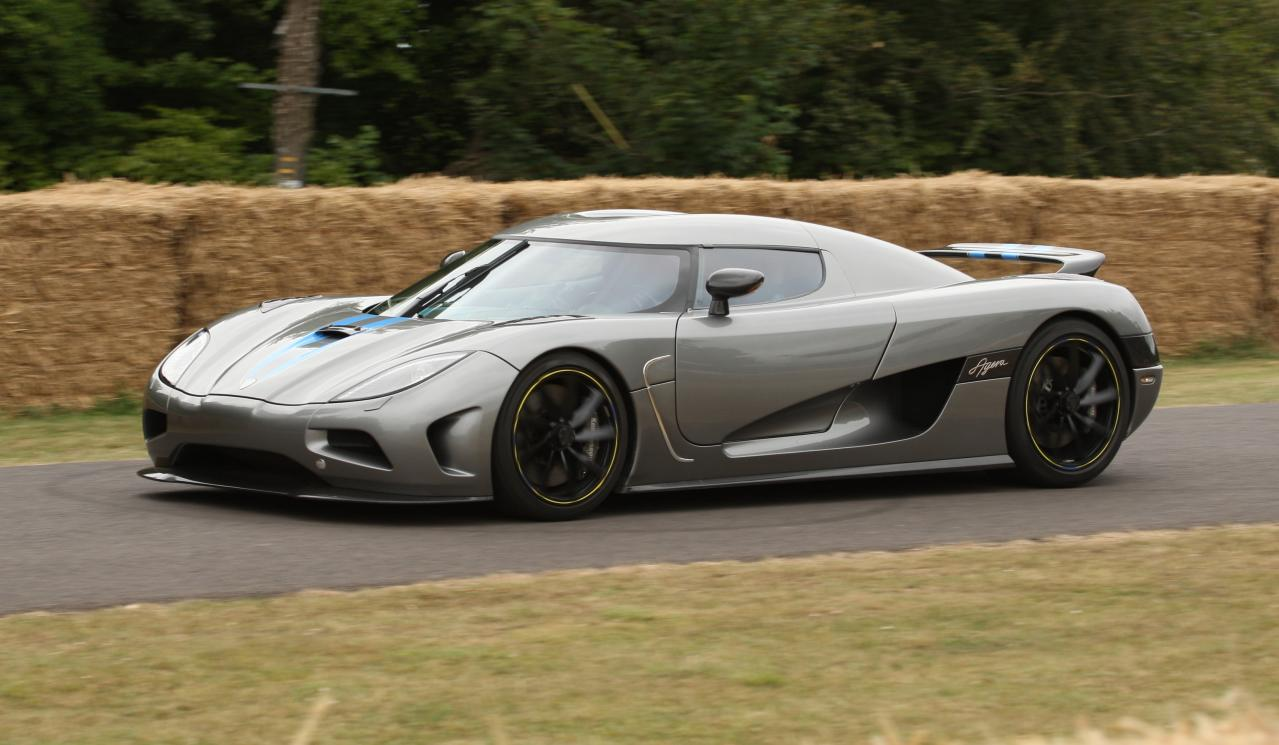
Koenigsegg Agera

The Agera has a body made from impregnated carbon fibre/kevlar with lightweight reinforcements. The car's hardtop roof is stowable under the front hood lid. The chassis is also made out of carbon fibre with an aluminium honeycomb structure that comes with integrated fuel tanks for optimal weight distribution and safety. The rear wing is electronically adjustable with auto setting or manual control in order to have as little compromise as possible between low drag and downforce, depending on driving conditions. The Agera comes with forged aluminum wheels with centre locking nuts, measuring 19-inch on the front and 20-inch on the rear and wrapped in a set of Michelin Super Sport tyres that can be used for speeds of up to 420 km/h (260 mph). Other notable features include the trademark "dihedral-synchro-helix-actuation" doors, a new traction control system, LED lighting, blue hood stripes that continue through the interior of the car and a custom interior with a new "Ghost light" lighting system, which uses carbon nanotubes in a unique configuration to shine through the car's aluminium buttons.

== Models ==
=== Koenigsegg Agera R (2011–2014) ===
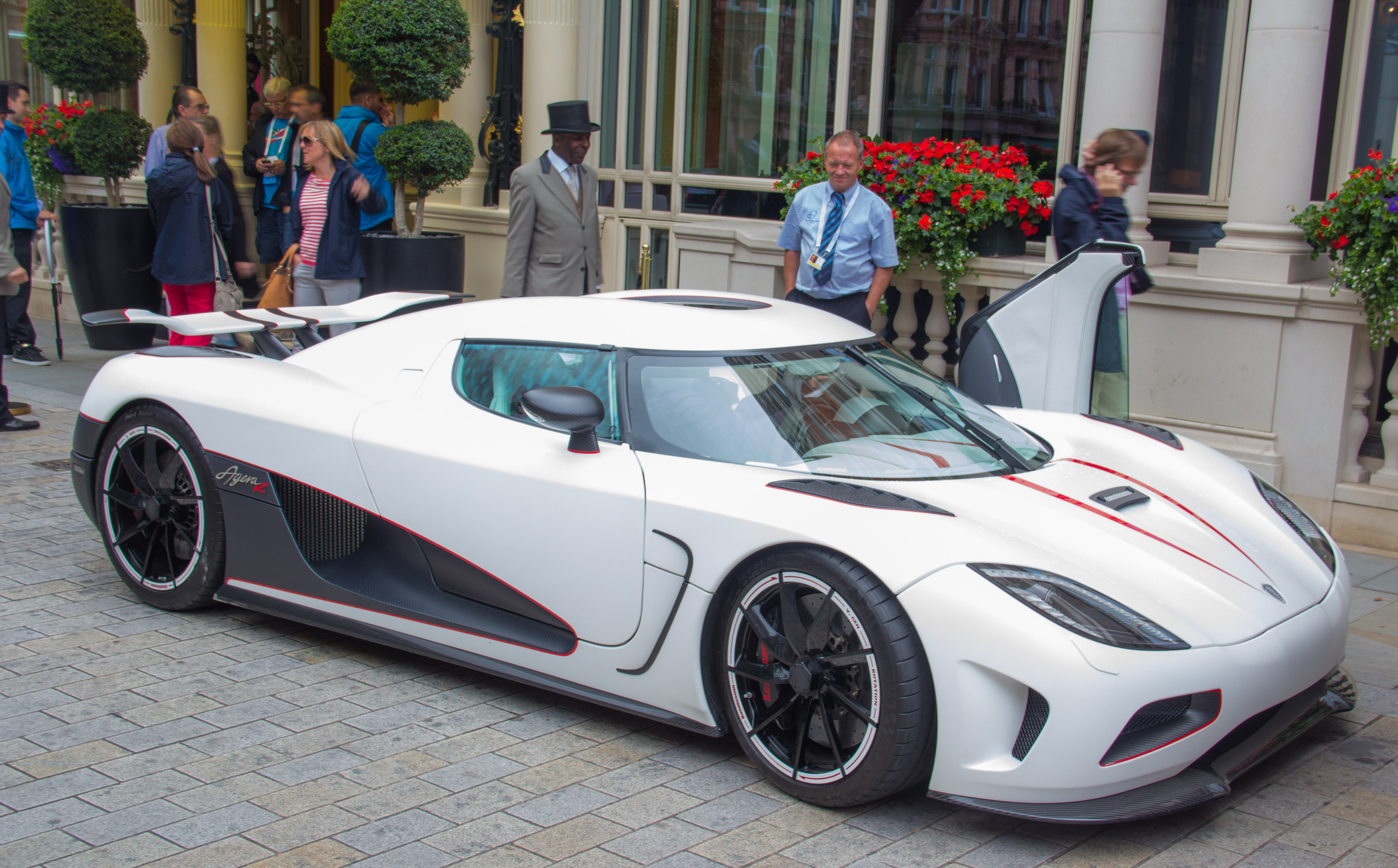
Koenigsegg Agera R Speed Racer

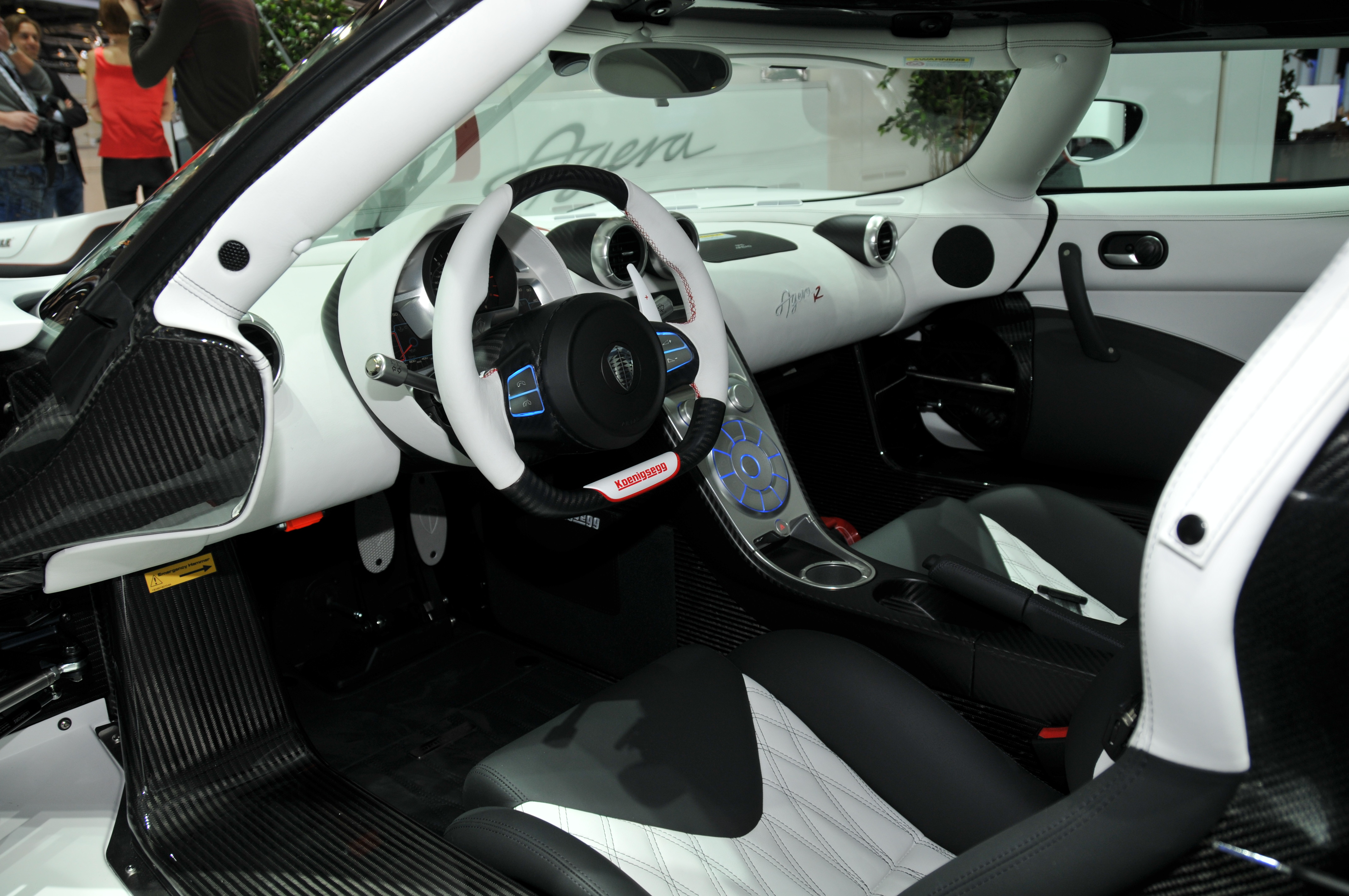
Koenigsegg Agera R Interior

The Agera R made its debut at the March 2011 Geneva Motor Show with a Speed Racer livery, and special Michelin tyres. It can accelerate from 0–100 km/h (0–62 mph) in 2.8 seconds and attain a theoretical top speed of 439 km/h (273 mph). The Agera R has a drag coefficient of Cd=0.37, or Cd=0.33 at high speed due to its adaptive rear wing, while producing 300 kg (660 lb) of downforce at 250 km/h (155 mph). This adaptive rear wing system is lighter than conventional hydraulic/electrical adaptive systems, and has the unique ability to compensate for head/tailwind due to its spring-loaded design. Furthermore, the pylons holding the wing play not only a role in the Agera R's aerodynamic performance, but also assist in extracting hot air from the engine bay.

On 2 September 2011, during test sessions in Ängelholm, the Agera R broke six world land speed records for a production car, including 0–300 km/h (0–186 mph) in 14.53 seconds, and 0–300–0 km/h in 21.19 seconds. The braking performance required to maintain this record is enabled in part by the Agera's stability, demonstrated by Koenigsegg test driver and drivetrain technician Robert Serwanski, who was recorded by passenger Rob Ferretti (founder of the group "Super Speeders") braking from 300 km/h to 0 without holding the steering wheel.

The Agera R can produce lateral cornering forces of 1.60 G, due to a combination of mechanical balance and high levels of grip from the specially developed Michelin Supersport tyres.

The 2013 version of the Agera R premiered at the 2012 Geneva Motor Show. Upgrades included carbon fibre wheels, enhanced aerodynamics, and engine upgrades allowing the Agera R's twin-turbo V8 engine to have a power output of 1,140 PS (1,124 hp; 838 kW) at 7,100 rpm and 1,200 N⋅m (885 lb⋅ft) of torque at 4,100 rpm on E85 biofuel. Koenigsegg's Flex Fuel Sensor technology allows the ECU to respond to varying fuel qualities and alcohol content by reducing power levels as a means of protecting the engine. On standard low-octane fuels, power is reduced to 960 PS (706 kW; 947 hp).

=== Koenigsegg Agera S (2013–2014) ===
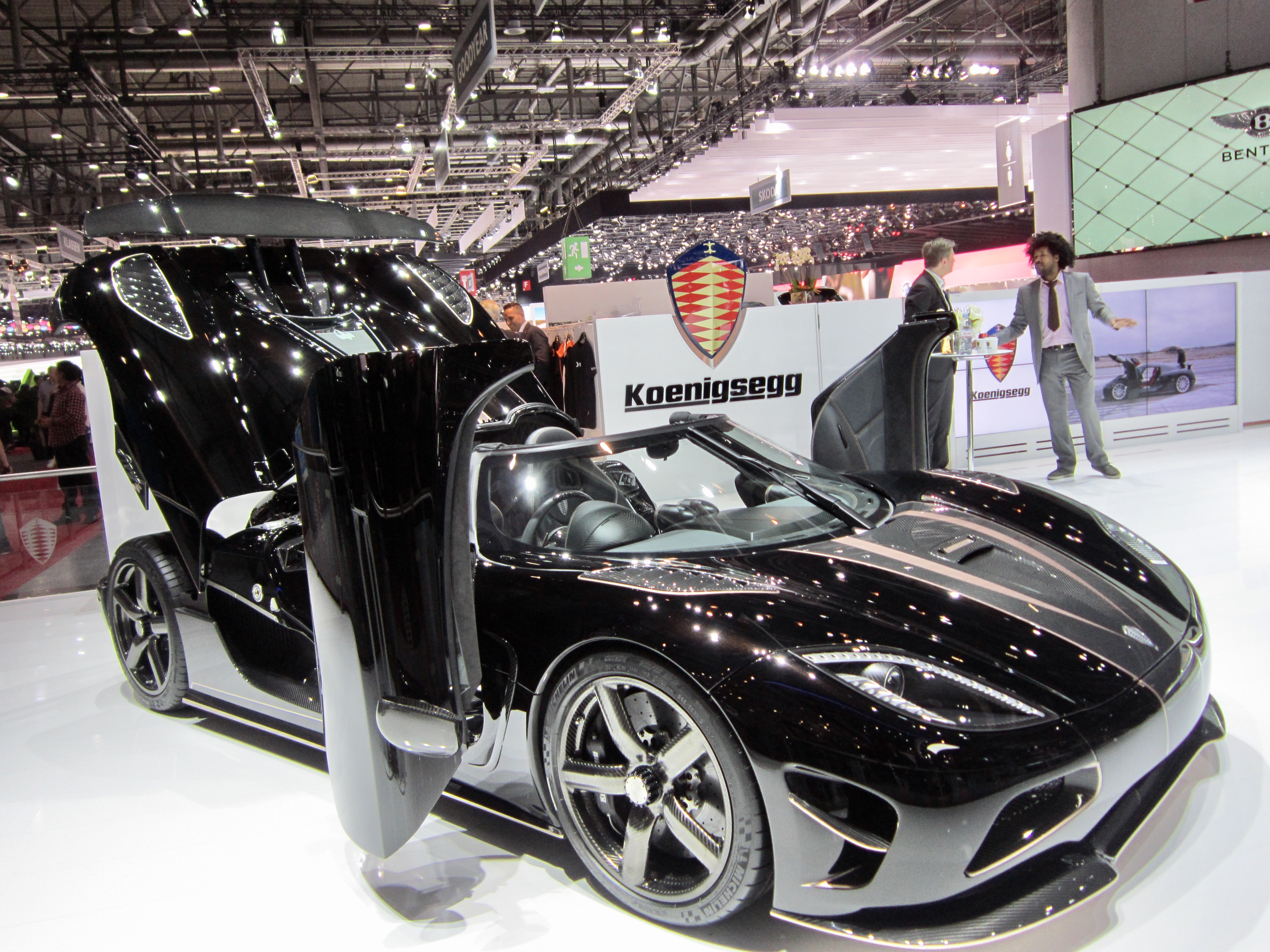
Koenigsegg Agera S

Koenigsegg presented the Agera S model in 2013. Built for markets lacking E85 biofuel, the Agera S has most of the upgrades of the Agera R compared to the normal Agera including the dynamic wing, but is optimised for running on low-octane petrol generating a maximum power output of 1,030 PS (758 kW; 1,016 hp) and 1,100 N⋅m (811 lbf⋅ft) of torque compared to the 960 PS (706 kW; 947 hp) and 1,100 N⋅m (811 lbf⋅ft) of torque of an Agera R running on the same fuel. In 2013, one Agera S was the 100th Koenigsegg ever produced, celebrated by a specially built car with gold leaf inlays named "Hundra" (Swedish for "one hundred").

=== Koenigsegg One:1 (2014–2015) ===
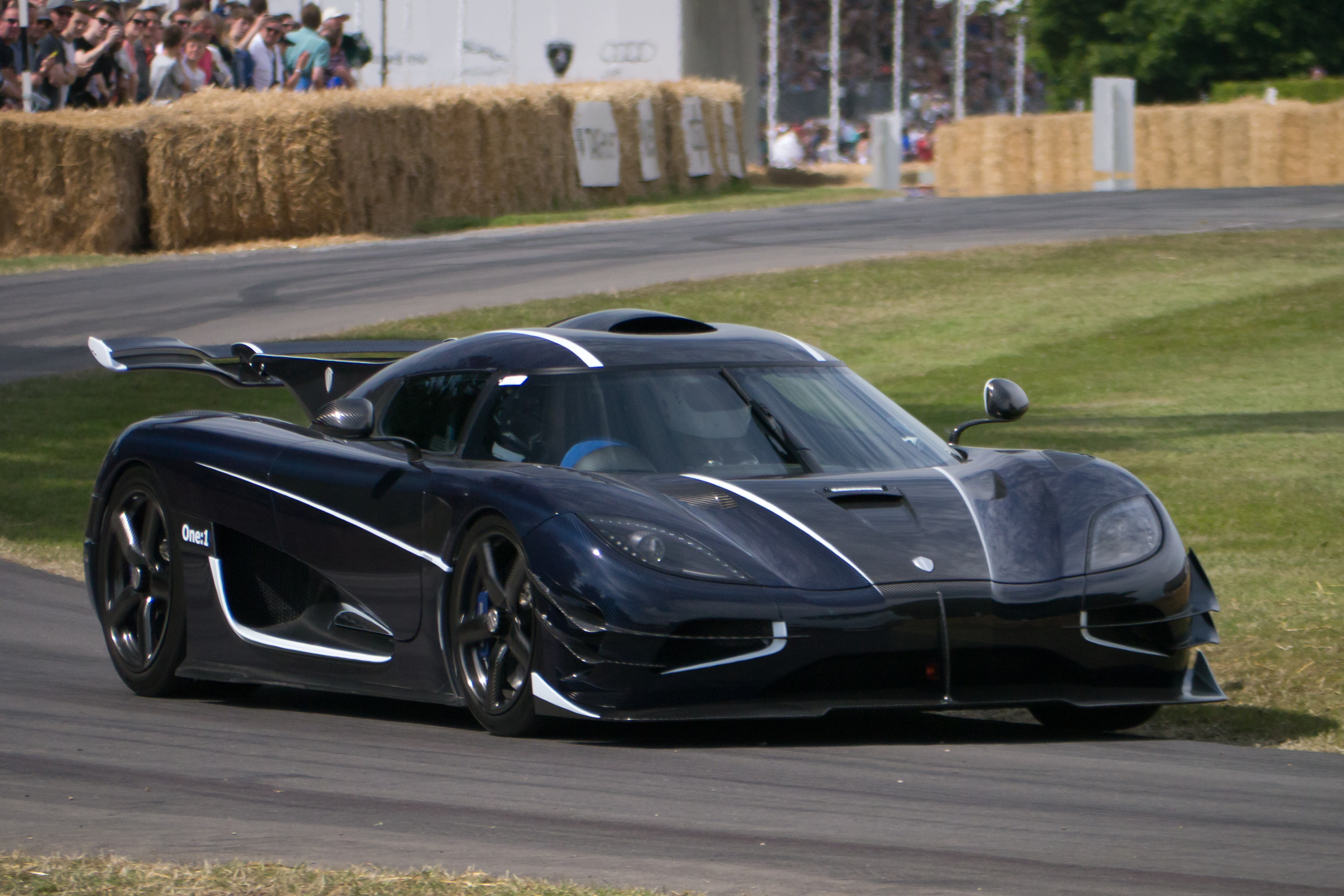
The Koenigsegg One:1 at the 2015 Goodwood Festival of Speed

The Koenigsegg One:1 was presented at the 2014 Geneva Motor Show held in March. Koenigsegg built six cars apart from the car presented at the Geneva Motor Show, all of which were already sold. Koenigsegg took two cars to the 2014 Goodwood Festival of Speed, where they were displayed alongside other sports cars such as the McLaren P1, LaFerrari, the Porsche 918 Spyder and the Pagani Huayra.

The car is fitted with a variant of the same 5.0 L twin-turbocharged V8 engine used in the other Agera variants. It generates a maximum power output of 1,360 PS (1,000 kW; 1,341 hp) at 7,500 rpm and 1,371 N⋅m (1,011 lb⋅ft) of torque at 6,000 rpm. The transmission is a 7-speed dual clutch paddle shift as used in other variants of the Agera.

The name One:1 comes from the power-to-weight ratio (1,360 PS to 1360 kg) giving the car 1 PS per 1 kg mass. The 1,360 PS power output is the equivalent of one megawatt, which Koenigsegg claims make the One:1 the 'world's first megacar'. The car is track-focused as opposed to the previous cars made by Koenigsegg, leading to changes such as limited boot space.

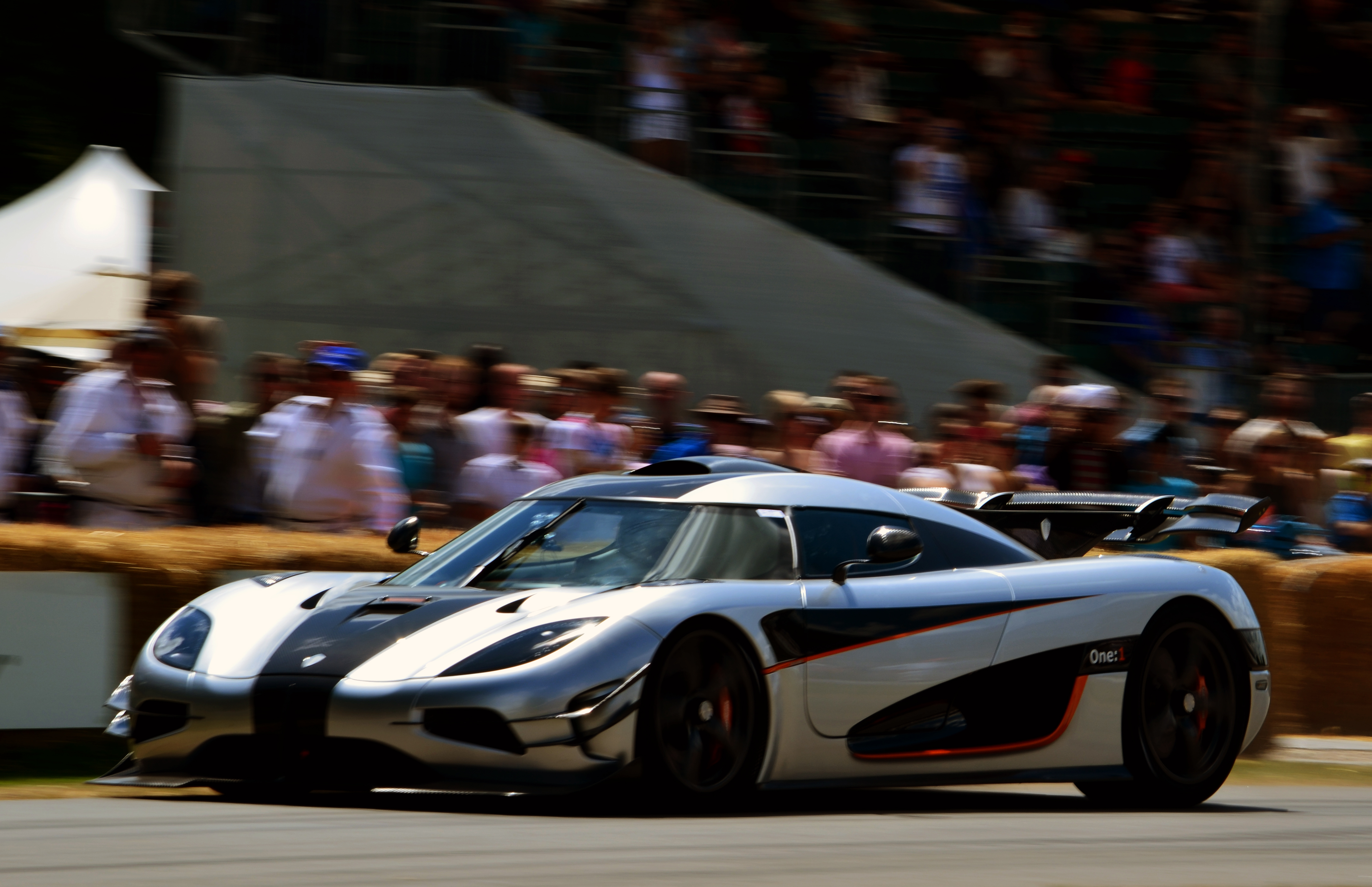

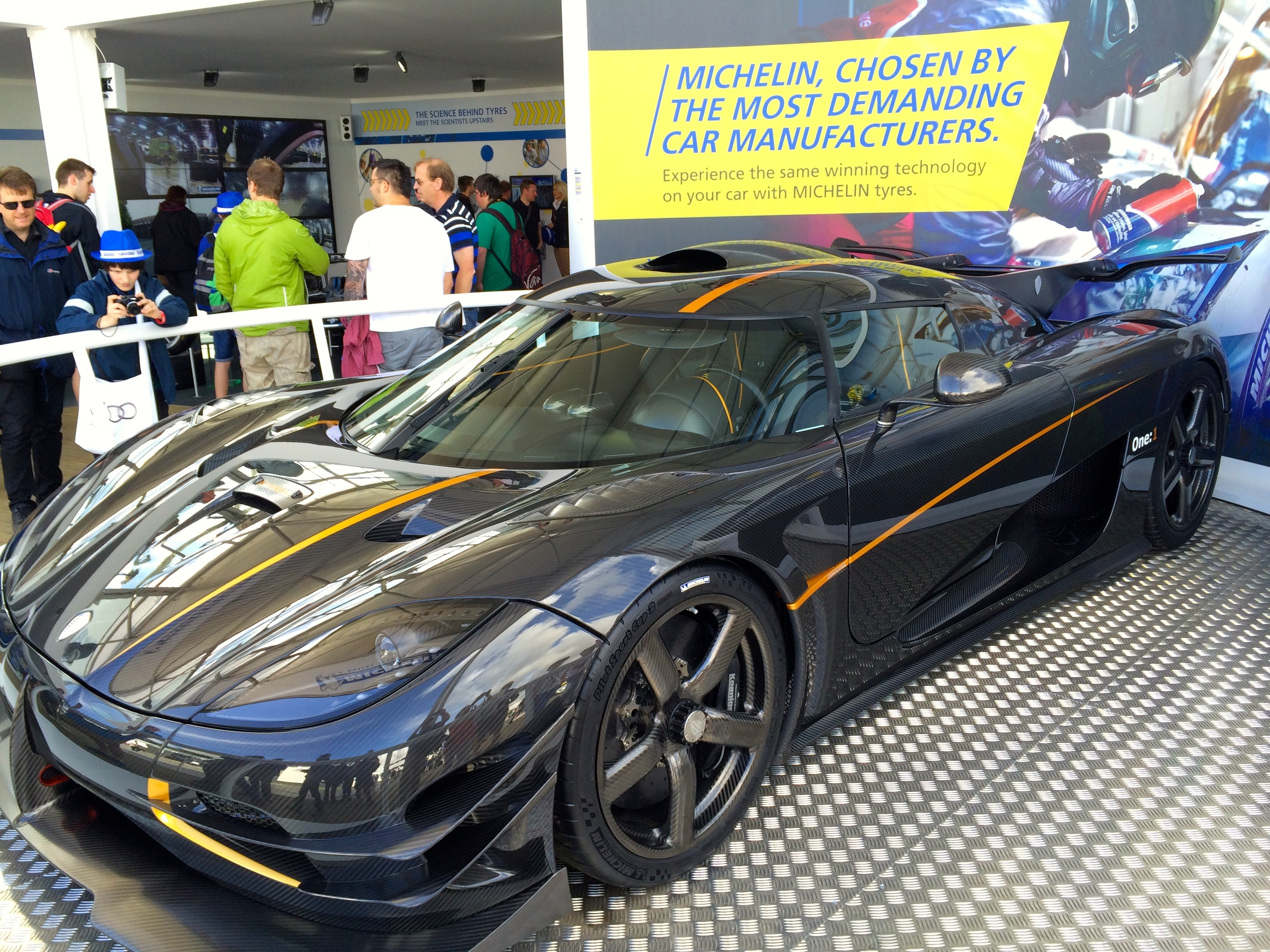

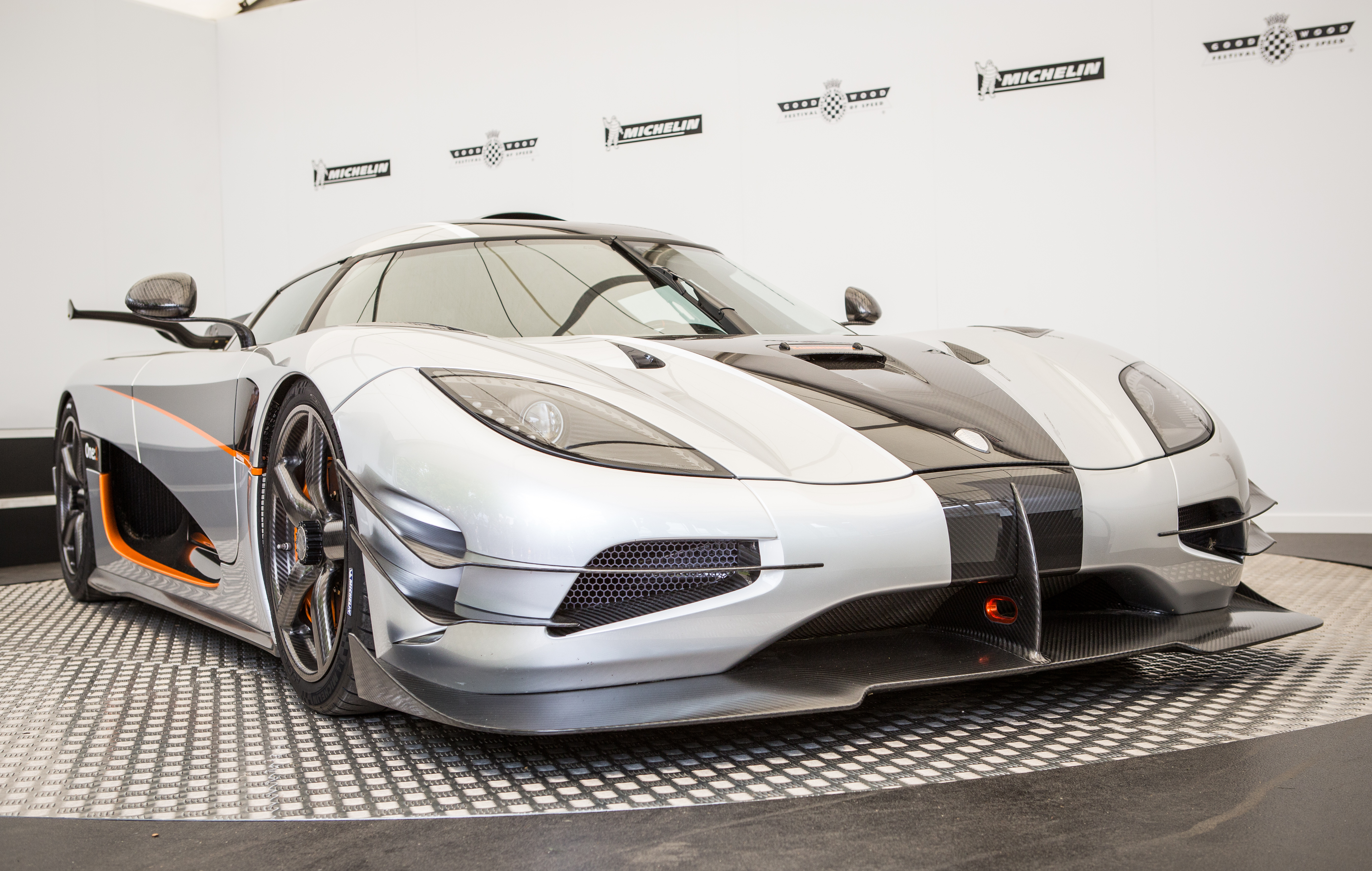

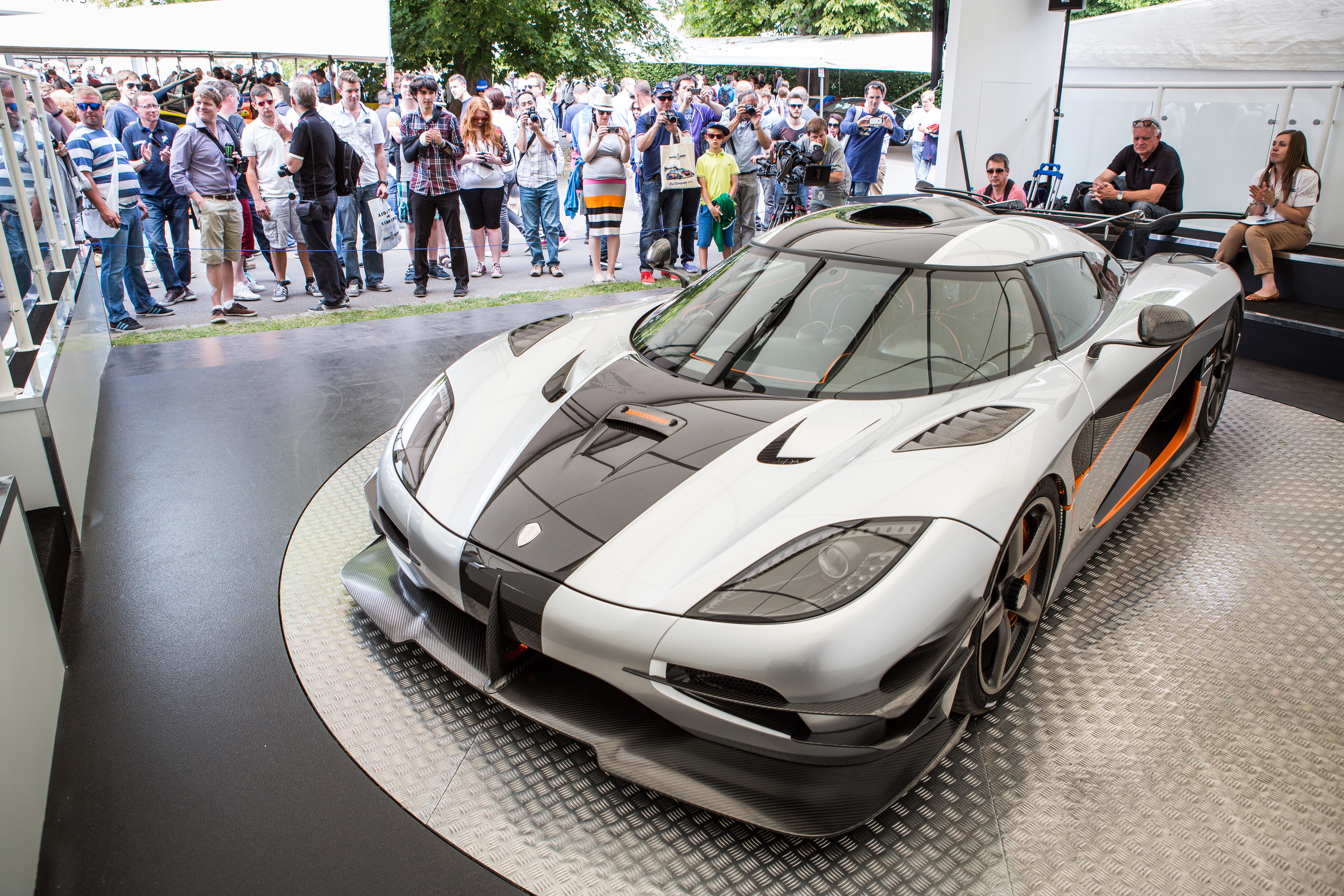

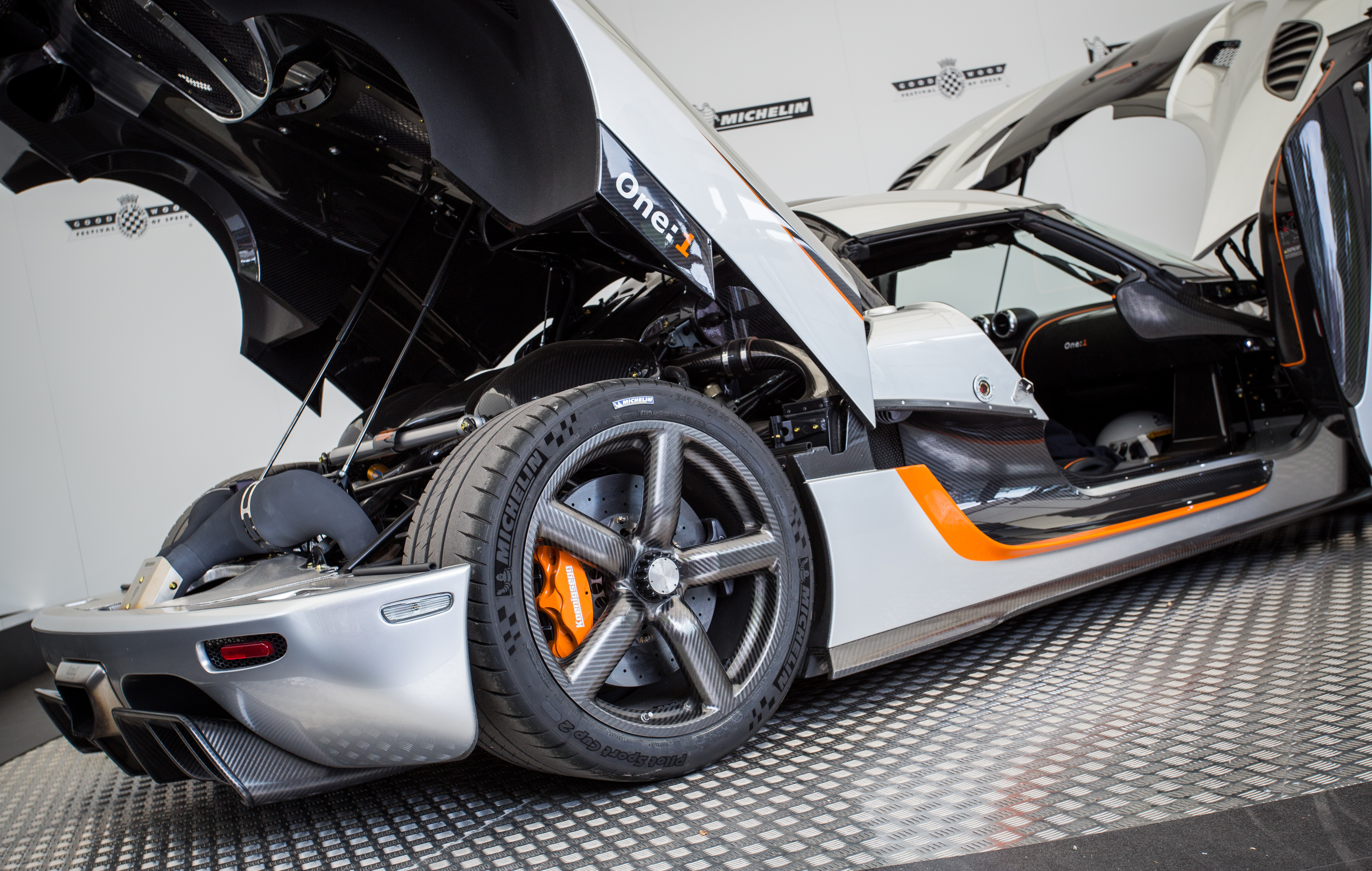

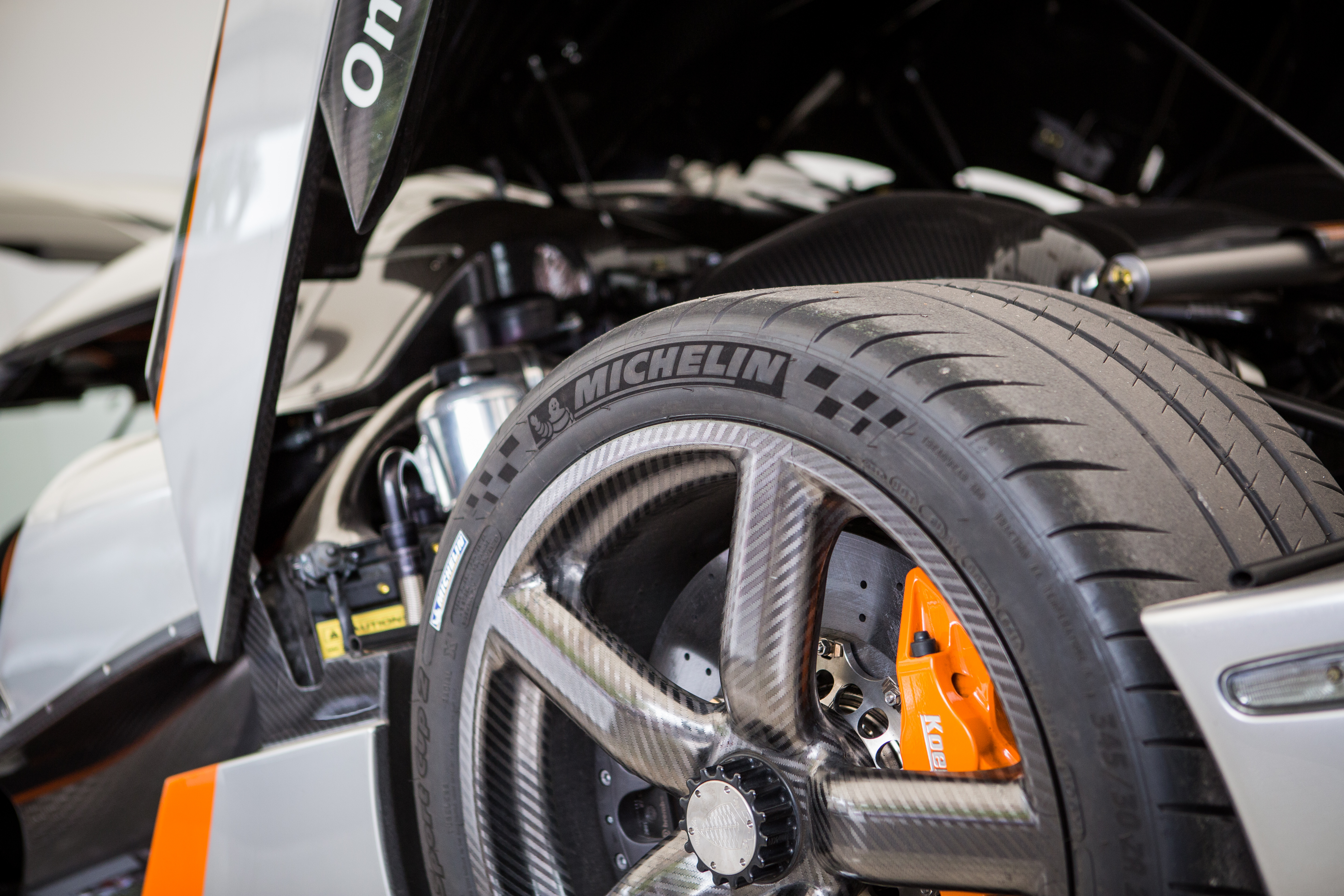

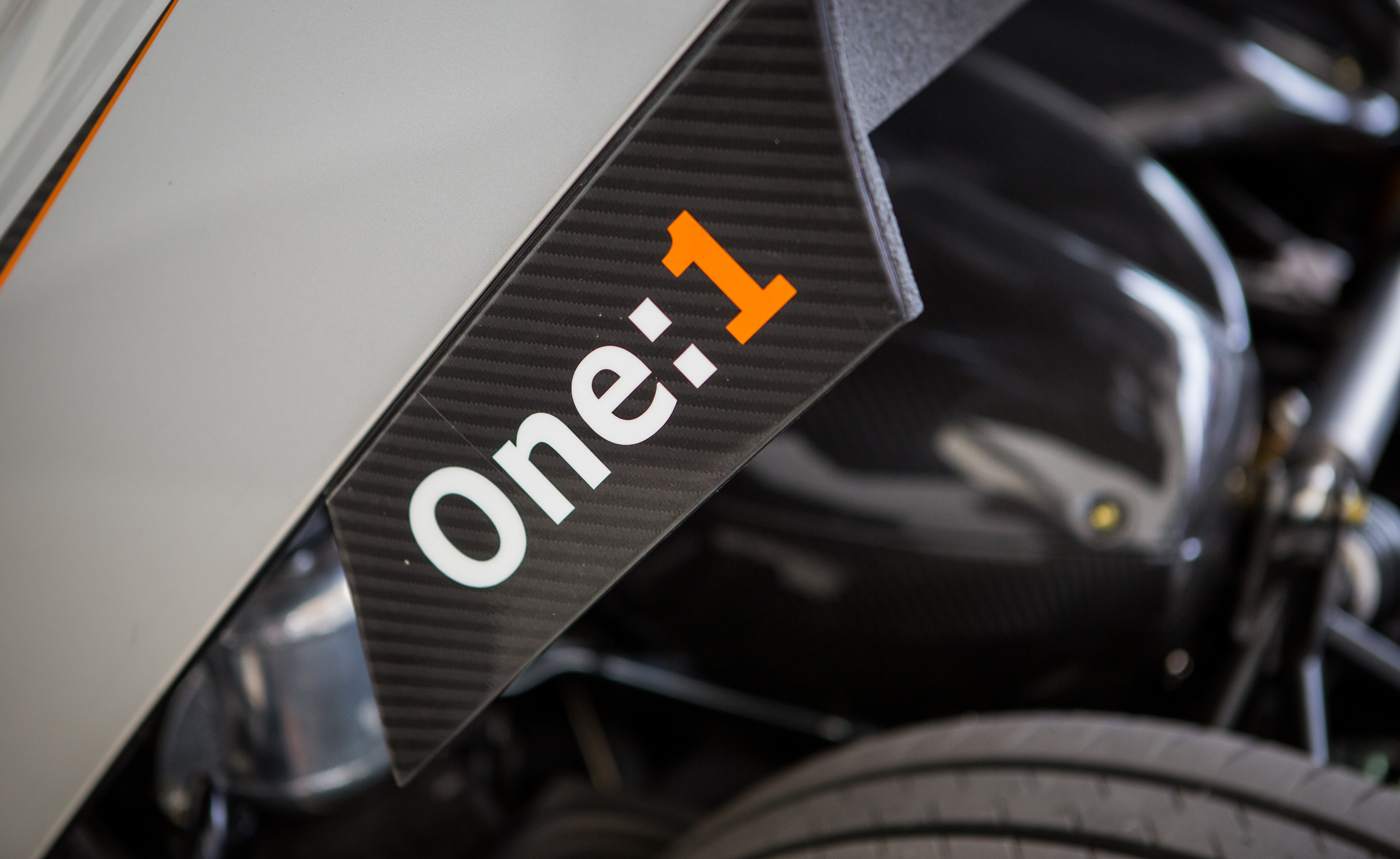

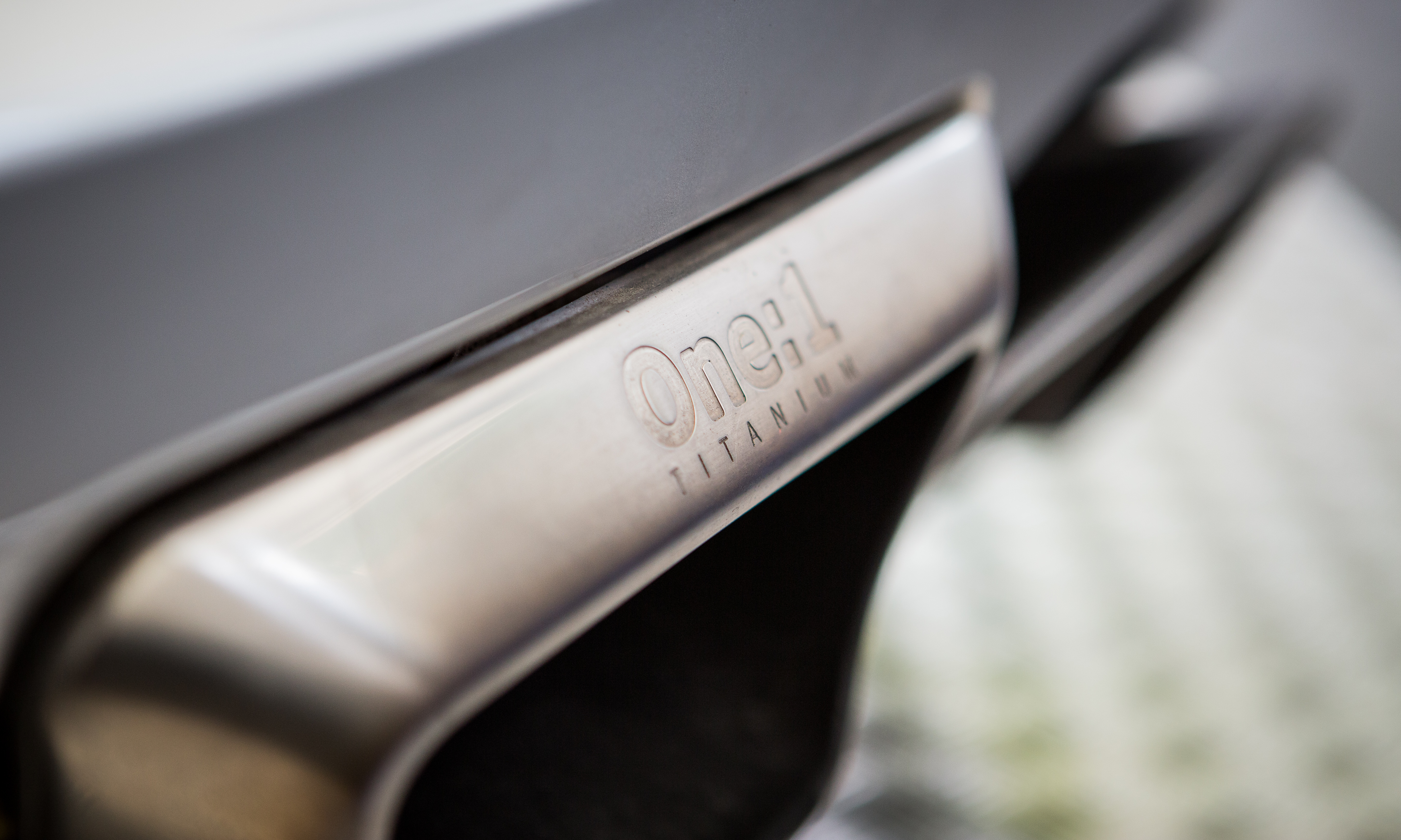

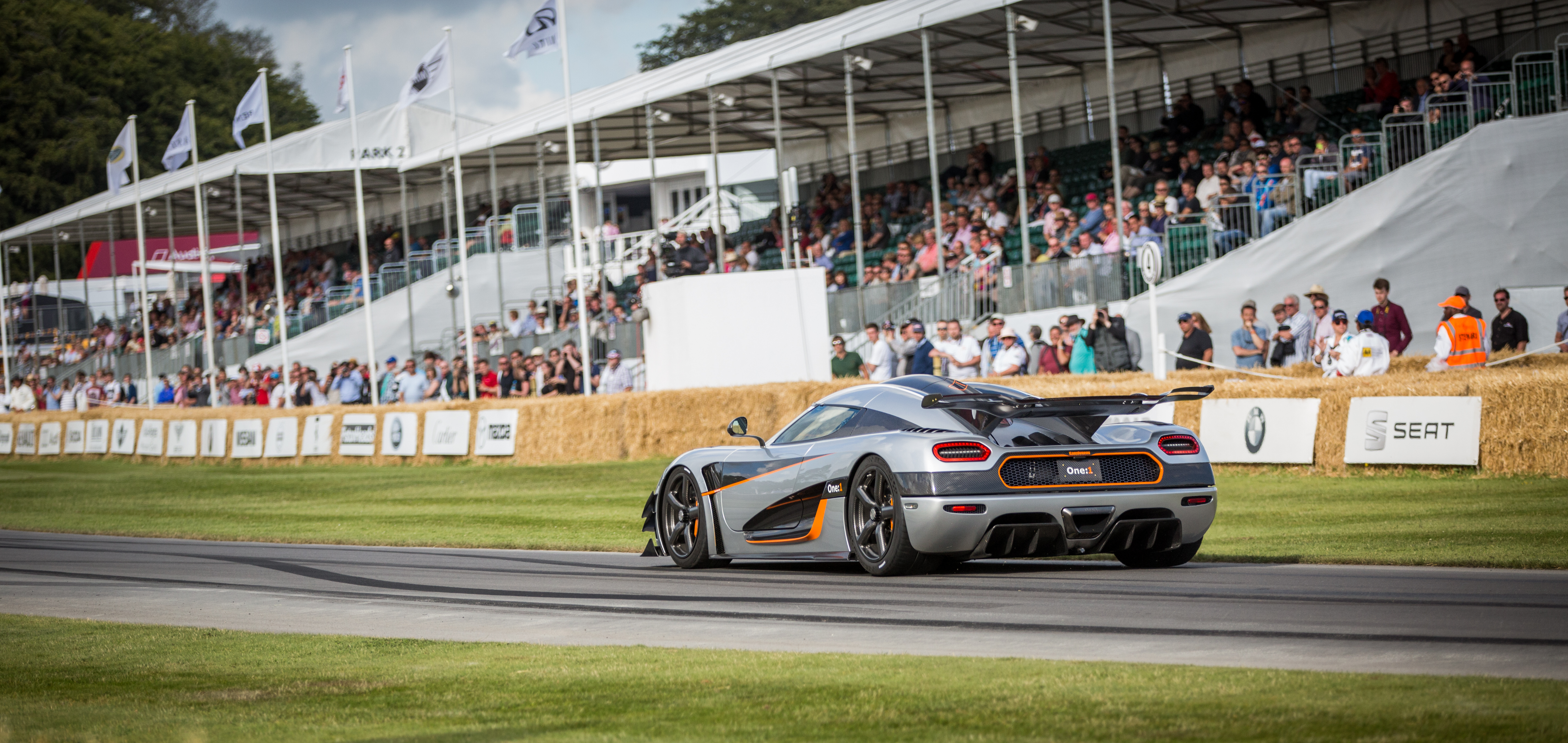

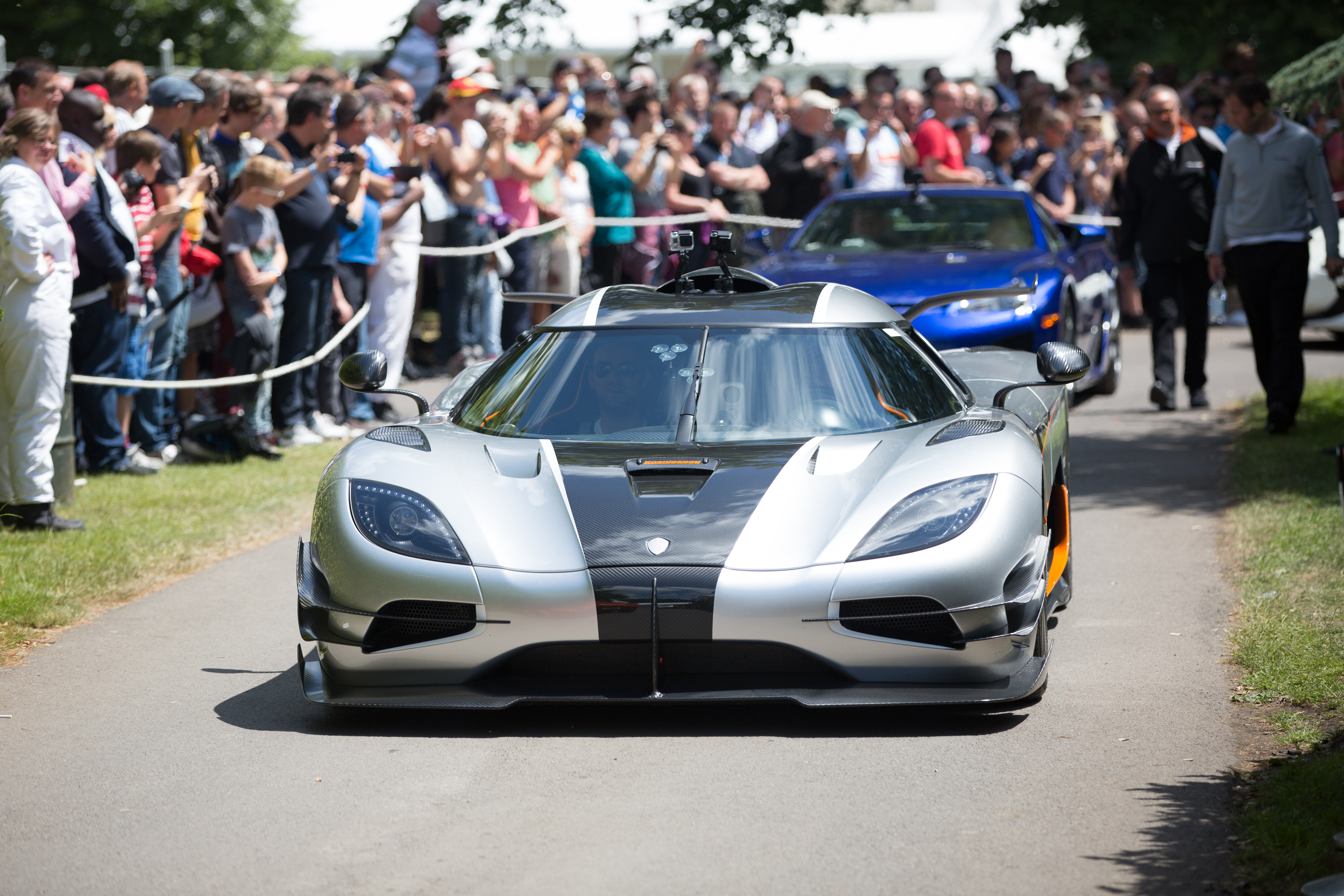

=== Koenigsegg Agera RS (2015–2018) ===
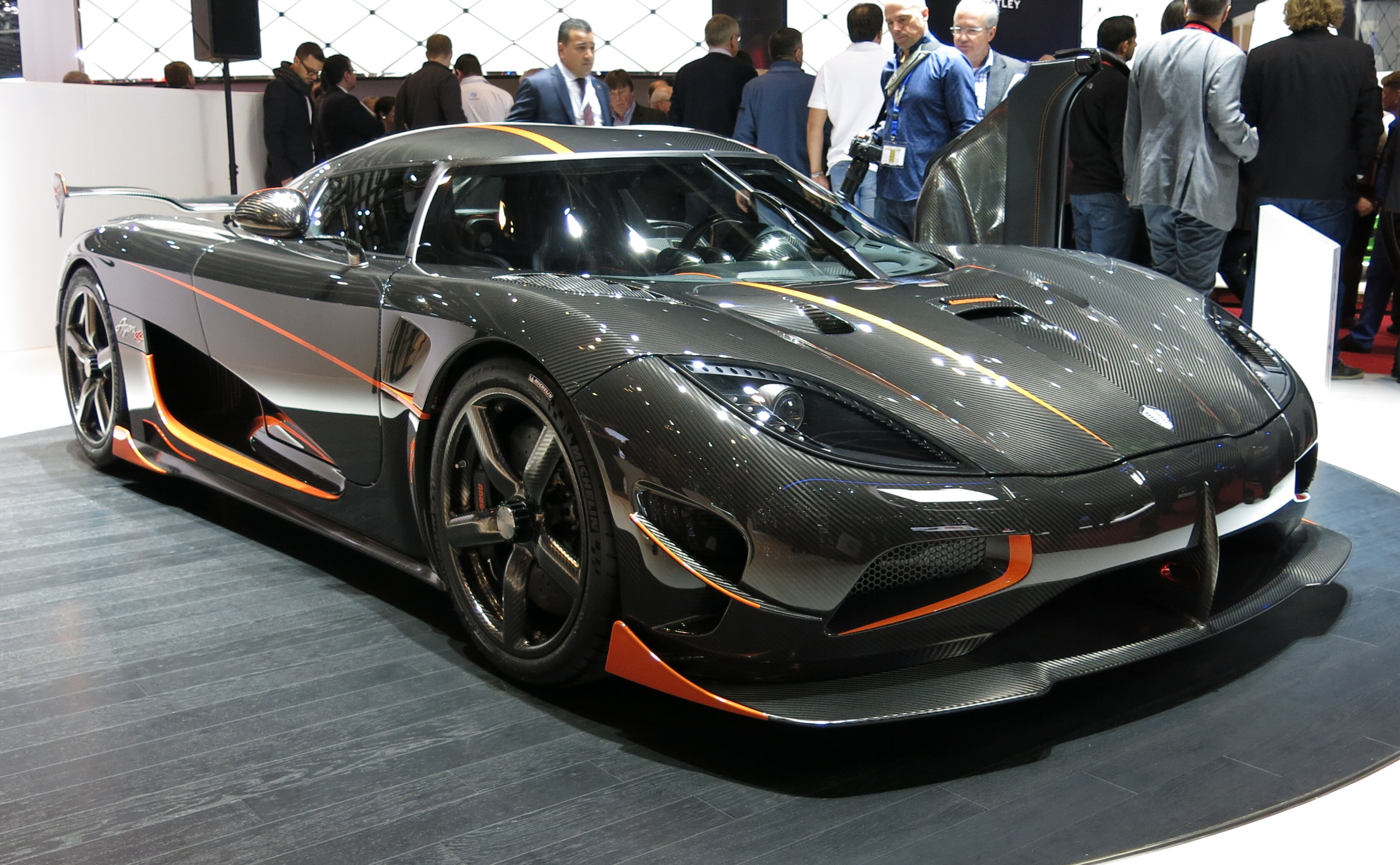
Koenigsegg Agera RS at the 2015 Geneva Motor Show

The Agera RS was unveiled at the 2015 Geneva Motor Show, along with the prototype version of the Regera. The Agera RS is an advanced version of the Agera R, implementing some of the new technology and features of the One:1 and combining the features of the Agera R and the Agera S. Koenigsegg billed it as "the ultimate track tool" due to its lightweight features and track optimised technologies. The Agera RS produces 450 kg of downforce at 250 km/h. The 5.0-litre V8 engine now has a power output of 1,176 PS (865 kW; 1,160 hp) on regular pump gasoline. The optional 1-megawatt package increases the engine's power to 1,360 PS (1,000 kW; 1,341 hp). 27 units of the Agera RS were built. The model was initially going to be limited to 25 units, however two extra cars were built, one being the factory development car and one as a replacement for a customer car damaged while it was being used for shakedown testing (Agera RS Phoenix built after the crash of Agera RS Gryphon).

The Agera RS has the following fuel economy: *21 L/100 km (11 mpg_{‑US}) in the city and 13 L/100 km (18 mpg_{‑US}) on the highway – which averages to 18 L/100 km (13 mpg_{‑US}).

The last Agera RS rolled off the production line on 4 April 2018.

=== Koenigsegg Agera Final Edition (2016–2018) ===
At the 2016 Geneva Motor Show, a final three-car series of the Agera was announced as a final celebration of the Agera range and as the last models to wear the Agera badge. The cars could be fully customised and combined with the Agera RS chassis with the One:1 engine. The first car to be unveiled was called the 'One of One'. It featured a unique orange paint scheme with bare carbon and blue accents. The exterior of the car was complemented with a large adjustable rear wing similar to the One:1 and triple front canards along with a large front splitter.

The other two distinct final edition cars were unveiled online in July 2018 and were called 'Agera FE Thor' and 'Agera FE Väder' respectively. Thor features a custom two-tone black paintwork consisting of crushed diamonds and white accents. The exterior features a large rear wing reminiscent of that found on the Agera XS, and a different set of front canards, along with a large front splitter and a Le Mans-style central fin for improved downforce, setting it apart from the rest of the Agera models. Väder features the same crushed diamond paintwork with a bare carbon fibre centre along with white accents, incorporating the same rear wing as Thor but excludes the central fin. Both cars made their public appearance at the 2018 Goodwood Festival of Speed.

== Special editions ==
There have been many special editions of the Agera built on customer request. Such special editions include:

Name	Chassis Number	Picture	Info
Agera N	084		Originally a standard Agera that was sent back to the factory in 2015 to be upgraded into an Agera R with One:1 Mirrors, One:1/Agera RS headlights, and an Agera RS exhaust system.
Agera X	088		This is a standard Agera that was nicknamed Agera "X" by its original owner Steffen Korbach who is currently the CEO of famous Porsche tuning company Gemballa.
Agera R Zijin	094		
Agera S+ Medusa	098		
Agera HH	099		A bespoke Agera S made for Danish programmer David Heinemeier Hansson finished in Monterey Blue with clear carbon fibre accents. It is the only Agera S in the United States.
Agera S Hundra	100		This one-off Agera S is the 100th Koenigsegg ever built. Its name Hundra means 100 in Swedish.
Agera RS HM	115		
Agera RS ML	118		The Agera RS ML is a bespoke RS that is finished in "Loke Yellow" which is named after the owner, Michael Loke – which is also what the "ML" badging stands for.
Agera RSR	122		A one of three limited-edition version of the Agera RS which was only sold to customers in Japan. The car features the top-mounted rear wing from the Koenigsegg One:1, while also featuring a shorter roof scoop enabling the roof to be stored in the front. The first RSR, chassis 7122 features a Turquoise exterior with a Tan leather interior. The second RSR, chassis 7123 is finished in Black with Red accents while the interior has Black leather. The third RSR, chassis 7124 is finished in white with red accents and features a different aero system from the other two with a new rear wing and front splitter.
Agera RS Naraya	127		The one off Agera RS Naraya finished in fully exposed blue carbon fibre with 18 Carat gold accents found all throughout the exterior of the car. The Naraya badge is decorated in 155 different diamonds.
Agera XS	128 142		Two unique Agera RS's that were built for customers Roger Beit and Kris Singh. The cars feature a completely unique rear wing and front canards. The first car is chassis 7128 and is finished in Karosserie Orange. 7128 also features the 1MW power upgrade, which the Candy Apple Red example does not.
Agera RS Gryphon	131		Originally commissioned by real estate mogul Manny Khoshbin, this bespoke Agera RS is finished in fully exposed carbon fibre with 24-carat gold accents. The car was crashed during pre-delivery testing in May 2017, and was used as a prototype for Koenigsegg. Then in May 2018 the car crashed once again, but was rebuilt in 2019 and sold to a customer.
Agera RS Valhall	135		Finished in Battleship gray with orange accents.
Agera RS1	136		
Agera RS Draken	137		A unique Agera RS finished in exposed carbon fibre that features crushed diamonds. It was originally made for Dan Kang, who named it Draken as that means Dragon in Swedish.
Agera RS Phoenix	144		The Koenigsegg Agera RS Phoenix was created as a replacement for the original owner, Manny Khoshbin's crashed Agera RS "Gryphon". The car is finished in fully exposed carbon fibre with 24-carat gold accents adorning the car. It also features a bespoke rear wing and other extra aero bits.
Agera RSN/RST	195		The Agera RSN is another bespoke Agera RS named after its original owner Neil. The car is finished in "Josh Blue" and features the 1MW power upgrade alongside the XS aero package. In 2023, RSN underwent a name change to RST as to fit its new owners name Tom, it was also equipped with subsequent badging updates.

== Technical data ==
	Koenigsegg Agera	Koenigsegg Agera R	Koenigsegg Agera S	Koenigsegg One:1	Koenigsegg Agera RS	Koenigsegg Agera Final
Production	2010	2011–2014	2012–2014	2014–2015	2015–2018	2016–2018
Engine	5.0L V8, Twin-turbo					
Displacement	Bore X Stroke: 91.7 mm × 95.25 mm (3.61 in × 3.75 in) per cylinder 5,032.5 cm³			Bore X Stroke: 92 mm × 95.25 mm (3.62 in × 3.75 in)per cylinder 5,065.48 cm³		
Transmission	Specially developed 7-speed dual-clutch 1 input shaft transmission with paddle-shift Electronic differential					
Power	960 PS (947 bhp; 706 kW) at 7,100	1,156 PS (1,140 bhp; 850 kW) at 7,100	1,030 PS (1,016 bhp; 758 kW) at 7,100	1,360 PS (1,341 bhp; 1,000 kW) at 7,500	1,176 PS (1,160 bhp; 865 kW) at 7,800; 1,360 PS (1,341 bhp; 1,000 kW) at 7,500 (1 MW upgrade)	1,360 PS (1,341 bhp; 1,000 kW) at 7,500
Torque	1,000 N⋅m (738 lbf⋅ft) at 2700 to 6170; 1,100 N⋅m (811 lbf⋅ft) at 4,000	1,000 N⋅m (738 lbf⋅ft) at 2700 to 7300; 1,200 N⋅m (885 lbf⋅ft) at 4,100 1,371 N⋅m (1,011 lbf⋅ft) at 6,000 (1 MW upgrade, offered on the last 2 Agera R' and Agera S')	1,000 N⋅m (738 lbf⋅ft) at 2700 to 6170; 1,100 N⋅m (811 lbf⋅ft) at 4,100 1,371 N⋅m (1,011 lbf⋅ft) at 6,000 (1 MW upgrade, offered on the last 2 Agera R' and Agera S')	1,000 N⋅m (738 lbf⋅ft) at 3000 to 8000; 1,371 N⋅m (1,011 lbf⋅ft) at 6,000	1,000 N⋅m (738 lbf⋅ft) at 2700 to 6170; 1,280 N⋅m (944 lbf⋅ft) at 4,100; 1,371 N⋅m (1,011 lbf⋅ft) at 6,000 (1 MW upgrade)	1,371 N⋅m (1,011 lbf⋅ft) at 6,000
RPM limiter	7,500/min		8,250/min			
0–100 km/h (62 mph)	3 sec	2.8 sec	2.9 sec	~ 2.8 sec	~ 2.9 sec (1 MW upgrade)	
0–200 km/h (124 mph)	8 sec	7.8 sec	7.9 sec	6.6 sec	~6.9 sec(1 MW upgrade)	
0–300 km/h (186 mph)		14.5 sec		11.92 sec	12.3 sec	
Curb weight (kg) / (lb) All fluids, 50% fuel	1,435 / 3,163	1,435 / 3,163	1,415 / 3,120	1,360 / 2,998	1,395 / 3,075	1,395 / 3,075
CO_{2} emissions	300–310 g/km					

== World records ==
World records set on 8 June 2015, with a Koenigsegg One:1

Record	Time
0–300 km/h	11.92 sec
0–200 mph	14.328 sec
300–0 km/h	6.03 sec
200–0 mph	6.384 sec
0–300–0 km/h	17.95 sec
0–200–0 mph	20.71 sec

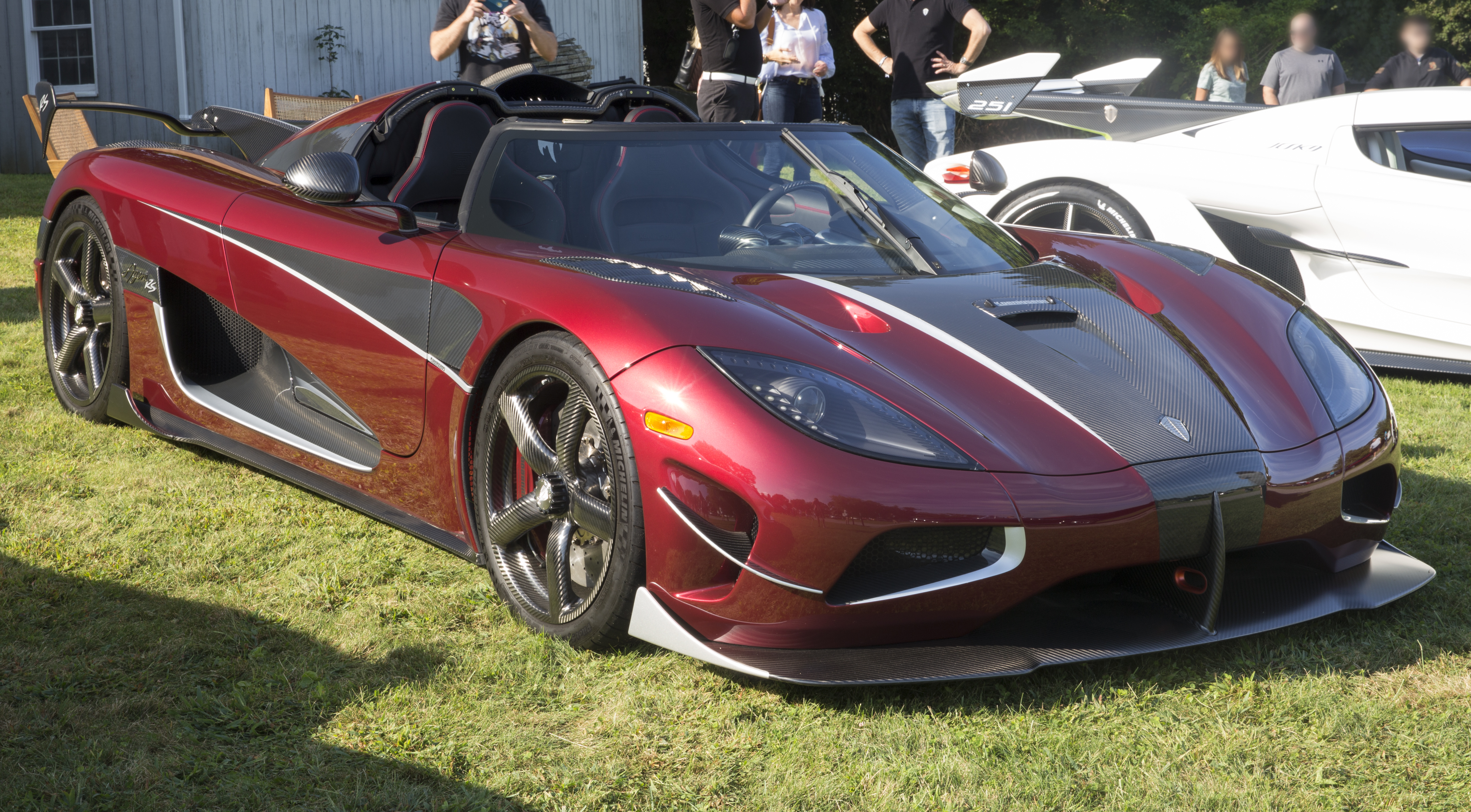
Koenigsegg Agera RS World Record car

On 1 October 2017, the Agera RS made the 0–400–0 km/h (0–249–0 mph) record in 36.44 seconds, 5.56 seconds faster than the record made by the Bugatti Chiron. The record was achieved on an old Danish airbase in Vandel, Denmark. The car was driven by Koenigsegg test driver Niklas Lilja. Koenigsegg mentioned that during the record run, the car accelerated from 0–400 km/h in 26.88 seconds over a distance of 1,958 metres and decelerated in 9.56 seconds over a distance of 483 metres. The total distance used for the record was 2,441 metres. During the speed record run on 4 November 2017, Koenigsegg also broke their previous 0–400–0 km/h record by 2.57 seconds. However, the record was broken by a Koenigsegg Regera − which completed the run in 31.49 seconds on 23 September 2019.

Record	Time
0–400–0 km/h	36.44 sec
0–400–0 km/h	33.29 sec

On 4 November 2017, Koenigsegg made the production car speed record with an Agera RS recording an average speed of 447.2 km/h (277.9 mph). The car achieved a speed of 457 km/h (284 mph) during its northbound run and 436 km/h (271 mph) during its southbound (return run). Official confirmation of the record by Guinness World Records still awaits. The car was driven by Koenigsegg test driver Niklas Lilja. The record run was made in opposite directions on an 18 km (11-mile) section of Nevada State Route 160 between Las Vegas and Pahrump in the United States which was closed specifically for that purpose.

Record	Speed (average)
Agera RS	447.2 km/h (277.9 mph)

== Successor ==
The successor of the Agera called the Jesko was unveiled at the 2019 Geneva Motor Show. The potential replacement was shown to prospective buyers via VR in an event held in Australia by the company beforehand.

== See also ==
- List of production cars by power output
