= Real Racing 2 =

2010 video game

- Cover Art featuring the BMW Z4 M Coupe Motorsport and Chevrolet Corvette C6.R GT2
- Developer: Firemint
- Publisher: Firemint
- Series: Real Racing
- Engine: Mint3D
- Platforms: iOS, Android, OS X Lion, Windows Phone 8
- Release: iOS: WW: December 16, 2010; Android & OS X Lion: WW: December 22, 2011; Windows Phone 8: WW: May 22, 2013
- Genre: Racing
- Modes: Single-player, multiplayer

Real Racing 2 is a 2010 racing game developed and published by Firemint for iOS, Android, OS X Lion, and Windows Phone 8. It was released on December 16, 2010 for iPhone and iPod Touch, powered by Firemint's own Mint3D engine. A separate iPad version was released on March 11, 2011. On January 11, 2012 Real Racing 2 was confirmed as one of twenty-seven titles to be released on Windows Phone as part of a partnership between Electronic Arts and Nokia. The game is the sequel to 2009's Real Racing, and the download requires a one-time payment. It was a critical and commercial success, and a further freemium sequel, Real Racing 3, was released in 2013.

Since 2021, the app is not purchasable and is only available if already purchased before its official removal.

== Gameplay ==
The HD version of Real Racing 2 showing the "in car" camera option

Control in Real Racing 2 is similar to that of its predecessor. The player is given five different control methods from which to choose: Method A features accelerometer steering (tilting the physical device to the left to turn left and to the right to turn right), auto accelerate and manual brake; Method B features accelerometer steering, manual accelerate and manual brake; Method C features a virtual on-screen steering wheel to steer, auto accelerate and manual brake, Method D features a virtual steering wheel to steer, manual accelerate and manual brake; Method E features touch to steer (where the play touches the left side of the touchscreen to turn left, and the right side to turn right), auto accelerate and manual brake. Within each of these options, the player can modify the amount of brake assist and steering assist, as well as selecting to turn on or off "anti-skid". In Methods A and B, the accelerometer sensitivity can also be modified.

When the player begins career mode, they have a choice of purchasing either a Volkswagen Golf GTI Mk6 or a Volvo C30. After purchasing their first car, the player moves on to the "Club Division" race class. The game as a whole is divided into five divisions; "Club Division", State Showdown", "Grand National", "Pro Circuit" and "World Series". Each division is further broken down into numerous individual races. Most races involve competing against fifteen AI opponents, but there are also two car head-to-head style and four car elimination races. After completing a certain number of goals, the player can move on to the next division, with the ultimate being to win the final race in the "World Series" division, the "Grand Finale". Throughout the game, when players reach specific goals, they are awarded bonus cash by in-game sponsors, which they can use to purchase new cars or upgrade their existing cars. In total career mode encompasses five divisions with fifty separate events and a total of eighty-nine races.

Other ways to play include a quick race, open time trials (which are connected to online leaderboards using Game Center), local multiplayer, online trial leagues and sixteen player online multiplayer mode.

== Cars and locations ==
The game features thirty officially licensed cars and fifteen tracks on which to race.

These cars include a 2010 BMW M3, a 2010 Chevrolet Corvette C6.R, a 2005 Ford GT, a 2010 Jaguar RSR XKR GT, a 2010 Lotus Evora, a 2010 Nissan GT-R, a 2008 Volkswagen Scirocco R and a 2010 Volvo C30 STCC. Upon completing career mode, the player is awarded a 1995 McLaren F1 GTR.

The locations (which are fictional) include McKinley Circuit, Forino Valley, King's Speedway, Montclair, Richmond Plains, Sonoma Canyon, Krugerfontein, Notting Forest, Alkeisha Island, Aarlburg Forest, Mayapan Beach, Chengnan, Castellona Bay, San Arcana and Balladonia Raceway.

== HD version ==
Real Racing 2 HD was released specifically for the iPad and iPad 2 on March 11, 2011. In April 2011, it was updated to take advantage of the iPad 2's mirroring function to utilize dual-screen gaming on an HDTV in 1080p. It requires the Apple Digital AV Adapter or an Apple TV as part of AirPlay Mirroring, which is included in iOS 5.

== Reception ==
Reception

Aggregate score
Aggregator	Score
Metacritic	94/100 (HD) 91/100

Review scores
Publication	Score
IGN	9/10
Pocket Gamer	10/10
TouchArcade	5/5
148Apps	4.5/5
AppSpy	5/5
Slide to Play	4/4
TouchGen	4.5/5

Awards
Publication	Award
TouchGen	Game of the Year (2010)
Slide to Play	Best Graphics (2010)
Slide to Play	Best Racing Game (2010)
Slide to Play	Game of the Year (2010 - runner up)
Pocket Gamer	Best Sports/Driving Game for iPhone & iPod touch (2011)
Pocket Gamer	Game of the Year for iPhone & iPod touch (2011)
Pocket Gamer	Overall Game of the Year (2011)

Real Racing 2 has received a great deal of critical acclaim, surpassing even that of its predecessor. The iOS version holds aggregate scores of 94 out of 100 on Metacritic based on eighteen reviews.

IGN's Levi Buchanan scored the game 9 out of 10, giving it an "Editor's Choice" award, and writing "Real Racing 2 is without a doubt the best racing game in the App Store today [...] With excellent handling and beautiful visuals, Real Racing 2 lays down a new marker for iPhone sim racers." Chris Hall of 148Apps scored the game 4.5 out of 5, echoing Buchanan in calling it the best racing game on the App Store; "in the racing sim category of the App Store, there really isn't another game that is as impressive as Real Racing 2." The Appera's Daniel Silva claimed it to be the best racing game on the App Store; "Real Racing was the king of racing games on the App Store when it was released, and kept that title until now. The only thing to replace that is the sequel which makes the original seem like child's play. Real Racing 2 is fantastic, and I can't recommend it enough." AppSpy's Andrew Nesvadba scored it 5 out of 5, stating "Real Racing 2 is the perfect pocket companion for fans of racing titles and a definite must grab."

Pocket Gamer's Tracy Erickson gave it a score of 10 out of 10, also giving it a "Platinum Award", and stating that "rare is a game like Real Racing 2 where not one major feature is lacking, not one element is out of balance, not one piece doesn't contribute to a sense of fun. From the lengthy career and groundbreaking 16-player online races to the spot-on handling and meaningful vehicle tuning, everything about Firemint's sequel is ideal. No other racing game on any portable device delivers such a complete package, nor matches its elegant style." Pocket Gamer awarded it Best Sports/Driving Game for iPhone & iPod touch, Game of the Year for iPhone & iPod touch and Overall Game of the Year in 2011. Slide to Play's Shawn Leonard scored the game 4 out of 4, saying "Real Racing 2 is the showcase racing game on the iOS platform. Not only is it a more attractive package over its outstanding prequel, but the sharp focus on being a legitimate simulation racing game takes it to a new plateau." It would go on to win awards for "Best Graphics" and "Best Racing Game", losing in the category of "Game of the Year 2010" to Angry Birds.

TouchArcade's Eli Hodapp scored the game 5 out of 5, and echoed other reviews in calling it the best racing game on the App Store. However, he went further, arguing it may be the best game in any genre on the App Store; "it's without a doubt the current king of iOS racing games. I'd go as far as calling it the perfect iPhone game. The controls are perfectly suited to the platform, the graphics are fantastic, and Real Racing 2 is compatible with every iOS device [...] There aren't many other games that showcase what the iOS platform is capable of more than Real Racing 2, so much so, that Apple should just be bundling it with their devices. Do not miss this game." TouchGen's Nigel Wood gave the game 4.5 out of 5 and an "Editor's Choice" award, writing "Firemint have once more crafted the ultimate racing game on iOS devices [...] Real Racing 2 is near perfect and out performs the original in every aspect." The game would go on to win TouchGen's "Game of the Year 2010" award.

During the 15th Annual Interactive Achievement Awards, the Academy of Interactive Arts & Sciences nominated Real Racing 2 HD for "Racing Game of the Year".
