= Snood 2: On Vacation =

2005 video game

- DS cover art
- Developer: Gravity-i Ltd
- Publishers: Destination Software, Cybiko
- Platforms: Game Boy Advance, Nintendo DS, mobile phones
- Release: Game Boy Advance: NA: October 2005; Nintendo DS: NA: November 2005; Mobile: NA: 31 October 2005
- Genre: Puzzle
- Modes: Single-player, Multiplayer

Snood 2: On Vacation (also released as Snood 2: Snoods on Vacation) is a 2005 puzzle video game developed by Gravity-i and published by Destination Software in the United States for the Game Boy Advance and Nintendo DS and Cybiko for mobile phones. Gameplay consists of clearing patterns of 'snoods' by matching pieces of the same color, in a manner similar to Puzzle Bobble or Bust-a-Move. The game is a sequel to the 1996 title Snood, ported to the Game Boy Advance in 2001. Upon release, Snood 2 met a mixed reception from critics, with praise directed to the game's variety of modes and criticism of its presentation and lack of originality.

== Gameplay ==
Gameplay in the DS version of Snood 2

Gameplay in Snood 2, similar to the original, is a puzzle video game that imitates the mechanics of Puzzle Bobble and requires players to connect chains of three or more 'snoods' of a color together from a cannon, causing them to dissolve. The objective of the game is to empty the number of snoods in the cannon before the snoods in the play area, that descend upon every shot of the cannon, cross a line on the bottom of the screen. The game features several modes, including a single-game 'Classic', a 5-level 'Journey', a ten-level 'World Tour', a 32-level 'Puzzle', and a progressively difficult 'Armageddon' mode. Additional unlockable bonus game modes include 'Snood Grab' and 'Snood Ball', in which players grapple hook or bounce snoods into the desired position instead of shooting them with a cannon. The game supports basic multiplayer, with the Game Boy Advance version utilising the Game Link Cable, and the DS version supporting wireless play.

== Reception ==
Reception

Review scores
Publication	Score		
Publication	DS	GBA	mobile
AllGame	2.5/5	2.5/5	
IGN	4.5/10		7.9/10
N-Zone	44%		
Planet Gameboy.de		53%	

Snood 2 received a mixed reception upon release. In a positive review for mobile, Levi Buchanan for IGN praised the game as having "significant depth" and highlighting the game's different modes of play. Craig Harris of IGN was less positive about the game's Nintendo DS version, finding the game to be "extremely identical" to Snood and critiquing the game's "ridiculously ugly" sprites and "lazy" execution of a port from the Game Boy Advance version due to not using touch controls. Similarly describing the title as "been-there done-that", GameZone praised the variety of game modes, but faulted the game's simplicity, lack of originality, small size of the display, and repetitive music. Chrisian Thol of Planet Game Boy found the game to be "not innovative enough and technically irrelevant" to improve upon the original game, citing the lack of improvements to the graphics, identical presentation between the Advance and DS versions, and the "boring and uninspired music". Finding the sequel to lack a reason to exist, Sascha Dowidat of N-Zone found the DS version of the game to have "imprecise" mechanics, "insignificant" graphics and music, and faulted the lack of touchscreen controls.
