= List of Vivendi Games titles =

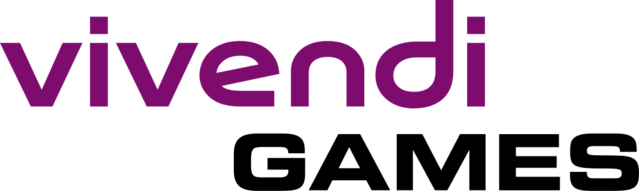

Vivendi Games was an American video game holding company founded in July 1996. It published games through various subsidiaries and labels, such as Black Label Games, Blizzard Entertainment (Diablo), Coktel Vision, Fox Interactive, NDA Productions, Sierra Entertainment, Universal Interactive and Vivendi Games Mobile. In December 2007, Activision announced a proposed merger deal with Vivendi Games that would create a new holding company named Activision Blizzard. The deal was approved by Activision's shareholders on July 8, 2008, and the merger was finalized on July 10, creating Activision Blizzard while dissolving Vivendi Games.

== Titles ==
The list does not include titles from Blizzard Entertainment.

=== 2001 ===
Title	Platform(s)	Release date	Developer(s)	Label(s)	Reference(s)
Tribes 2	Microsoft Windows	March 29, 2001	Dynamix	Sierra	
Tribes 2	Linux	April 19, 2001	Loki Entertainment	Sierra	
The Mummy Returns	Game Boy Color	April 26, 2001	Game Brains	Universal Interactive Studios	
Hoyle Slots	Macintosh	May 1, 2001	Sierra	Sierra On-Line	
Hoyle Slots	Microsoft Windows	May 1, 2001	Sierra	Sierra On-Line	
Half-Life: Blue Shift	Microsoft Windows	June 12, 2001	Gearbox Software	Sierra	
Poseidon: Zeus Official Expansion	Microsoft Windows	June 22, 2001	Impressions Games	Sierra	
Arcanum: Of Steamworks & Magick Obscura	Microsoft Windows	August 21, 2001	Troika Games	Sierra	
Hoyle Casino	Microsoft Windows	August 30, 2001	Sierra On-Line	Sierra	
Barbie: Explorer	PlayStation	September 4, 2001	Runecraft	Vivendi Universal Interactive Publishing	
Throne of Darkness	Microsoft Windows	September 25, 2001	Click Entertainment	Sierra	
SWAT 3: Tactical Game of the Year Edition	Microsoft Windows	October 2, 2001	Sierra On-Line	Sierra	
The Operative: No One Lives Forever – Game of the Year Edition	Microsoft Windows	October 3, 2001	Monolith Productions, Third Law Interactive	Sierra	
Barbie Beach Vacation	Microsoft Windows	October 3, 2001	Krome Studios	Vivendi Universal Interactive Publishing	
The Mummy Returns	PlayStation 2	October 3, 2001	Blitz Games	Universal Interactive Studios	
Dark Age of Camelot	Microsoft Windows	October 9, 2001	Mythic Entertainment	N/A (North American distribution)	
Aliens Versus Predator 2	Microsoft Windows	October 22, 2001	Monolith Productions	Sierra	
Half-Life	PlayStation 2	October 29, 2001	Gearbox Software	Sierra	
Crash Bandicoot: The Wrath of Cortex	PlayStation 2	October 29, 2001	Traveller's Tales	Universal Interactive Studios	
Diva Starz: Mall Mania	Game Boy Color	November 1, 2001	Digital Illusions Canada	Vivendi Universal Interactive Publishing	
Spyro: Season of Ice	Game Boy Advance	November 7, 2001	Digital Eclipse	Universal Interactive Studios	
Empire Earth	Microsoft Windows	November 13, 2001	Stainless Steel Studios	Sierra	
Elfenwelt	Microsoft Windows	December 6, 2001	MadCat Interactive	Sierra	
NASCAR Racing 4	Microsoft Windows	2001	Papyrus Design Group	Sierra	
The $100,000 Pyramid	Microsoft Windows	2001	Hypnotix	Sierra	
The Incredible Machine: Even More Contraptions	Macintosh	2001	Dynamix	Sierra	
The Incredible Machine: Even More Contraptions	Microsoft Windows	2001	Dynamix	Sierra	
Adventures with Barbie: Ocean Discovery	Microsoft Windows	2001	Gorilla Systems	Vivendi Universal Interactive Publishing	
Barbie Team Gymnastics	Microsoft Windows	2001	Blue Planet Software	Vivendi Universal Interactive Publishing	
Secret Agent Barbie	Microsoft Windows	2001	Gigawatt Studios	Vivendi Universal Interactive Publishing	

=== 2002 ===
Title	Platform(s)	Release date	Developer(s)	Label(s)	Reference(s)
Crash Bandicoot: The Huge Adventure	Game Boy Advance	February 27, 2002	Vicarious Visions	Universal Interactive	
The Scorpion King: Sword of Osiris	Game Boy Advance	April 2, 2002	WayForward Technologies	Universal Interactive	
The Operative: No One Lives Forever	PlayStation 2	April 17, 2002	Monolith Productions	Sierra	
Die Hard: Nakatomi Plaza	Microsoft Windows	April 24, 2002	Piranha Games	Sierra	
Crash Bandicoot: The Wrath of Cortex	Xbox	April 26, 2002	Traveller's Tales	Universal Interactive	
Bruce Lee: Quest of the Dragon	Xbox	July 2, 2002	Ronin Entertainment	Universal Interactive	
The Thing	Microsoft Windows	August 20, 2002	Computer Artworks	Black Label Games	
The Thing	PlayStation 2	August 20, 2002	Computer Artworks	Black Label Games	
Aliens Versus Predator 2: Primal Hunt	Microsoft Windows	August 29, 2002	Third Law Interactive	Sierra	
Barbie: Groovy Games	Game Boy Advance	September 4, 2002	Digital Illusions Canada	Vivendi Universal Games	
The Thing	Xbox	September 10, 2002	Computer Artworks	Black Label Games	
4x4 Evo 2	GameCube	September 10, 2002	Terminal Reality	Universal Interactive	
Emperor: Rise of the Middle Kingdom	Microsoft Windows	September 10, 2002	BreakAway Games, Impressions Games	Sierra	
The Scorpion King: Rise of the Akkadian	GameCube	September 11, 2002	Point of View	Universal Interactive	
The Scorpion King: Rise of the Akkadian	PlayStation 2	September 11, 2002	Point of View	Universal Interactive	
Empire Earth: The Art of Conquest	Microsoft Windows	September 16, 2002	Mad Doc Software	Sierra	
Crash Bandicoot: The Wrath of Cortex	GameCube	September 17, 2002	Eurocom	Universal Interactive	
Hoyle Casino Empire	Microsoft Windows	September 23, 2002	Sierra Entertainment	Sierra	
Tribes: Aerial Assault	PlayStation 2	September 23, 2002	Inevitable Entertainment	Sierra	
Butt-Ugly Martians: B.K.M. Battles	Game Boy Advance	September 24, 2002	Runecraft	Vivendi Universal Games	
The Lord of the Rings: The Fellowship of the Ring	Game Boy Advance	September 24, 2002	Pocket Studios	Black Label Games	
The Lord of the Rings: The Fellowship of the Ring	Xbox	September 24, 2002	WXP	Black Label Games	
Spyro 2: Season of Flame	Game Boy Advance	September 25, 2002	Digital Eclipse	Universal Interactive	
Monster Force	Game Boy Advance	September 29, 2002	Digital Eclipse	Universal Interactive	
No One Lives Forever 2: A Spy in H.A.R.M.'s Way	Microsoft Windows	October 5, 2002	Monolith Productions	Sierra	
The Lord of the Rings: The Fellowship of the Ring	PlayStation 2	October 15, 2002	Surreal Software	Black Label Games	
The Lord of the Rings: The Fellowship of the Ring	Microsoft Windows	October 22, 2002	Surreal Software	Black Label Games	
Spyro: Enter the Dragonfly	PlayStation 2	November 5, 2002	Equinoxe Digital Entertainment / Check Six Studios	Universal Interactive	
Whirl Tour	GameCube	November 5, 2002	Papaya Studio	Vivendi Universal Games	
Whirl Tour	PlayStation 2	November 5, 2002	Papaya Studio	Vivendi Universal Games	
Barbie as Rapunzel: A Creative Adventure	Macintosh	November 15, 2002	Funnybone Interactive	Vivendi Universal Games	
Barbie as Rapunzel: A Creative Adventure	Microsoft Windows	November 15, 2002	Funnybone Interactive	Vivendi Universal Games	
Barbie Sparkling Ice Show	Microsoft Windows	November 15, 2002	Krome Studios	Vivendi Universal Games	
Die Hard: Vendetta	GameCube	November 18, 2002	Bits Studios	Sierra (NA); NDA Productions (EU)	
James Cameron's Dark Angel	Microsoft Windows	November 18, 2002	Radical Entertainment	Sierra	
James Cameron's Dark Angel	Xbox	November 20, 2002	Radical Entertainment	Sierra	
Spyro: Enter the Dragonfly	GameCube	November 19, 2002	Equinoxe Digital Entertainment / Check Six Studios	Universal Interactive	
Dark Age of Camelot: Shrouded Isles	Microsoft Windows	December 3, 2002	Mythic Entertainment	Vivendi Universal Games	
Barbie: Explorer	Microsoft Windows	2002	Runecraft	Vivendi Universal Games	
Dell Magazines Crosswords	Macintosh	2002	Unknown	Sierra	
Dell Magazines Crosswords	Microsoft Windows	2002	Unknown	Sierra	
Hoyle Card Games	Macintosh	2002	Unknown	Sierra	
Hoyle Card Games	Microsoft Windows	2002	Unknown	Sierra	

=== 2003 ===
Title	Platform(s)	Release date	Developer(s)	Label(s)	Reference(s)
Crash Bandicoot 2: N-Tranced	Game Boy Advance	January 7, 2003	Vicarious Visions	Universal Interactive	
NASCAR Racing 2003 Season	Microsoft Windows	February 14, 2003	Papyrus Design Group	Sierra	
Jurassic Park: Operation Genesis	Microsoft Windows	March 10, 2003	Blue Tongue Entertainment	Universal Interactive	
Enclave	Microsoft Windows	March 11, 2003	Starbreeze Studios	Black Label Games	
Jurassic Park: Operation Genesis	PlayStation 2	March 26, 2003	Blue Tongue Entertainment	Universal Interactive	
Jurassic Park: Operation Genesis	Xbox	March 26, 2003	Blue Tongue Entertainment	Universal Interactive	
Bruce Lee: Return of the Legend	Game Boy Advance	March 28, 2003	Vicarious Visions	Universal Interactive	
Hulk	GameCube	May 28, 2003	Radical Entertainment	Universal Interactive	
Hulk	Microsoft Windows	May 28, 2003	Radical Entertainment	Universal Interactive	
Hulk	PlayStation 2	May 28, 2003	Radical Entertainment	Universal Interactive	
Hulk	Xbox	May 28, 2003	Radical Entertainment	Universal Interactive	
The Incredible Hulk	Game Boy Advance	May 28, 2003	Pocket Studios	Universal Interactive	
Mace Griffin: Bounty Hunter	PlayStation 2	June 17, 2003	Warthog Games	Black Label Games	
Mace Griffin: Bounty Hunter	Xbox	June 17, 2003	Warthog Games	Black Label Games	
Futurama	PlayStation 2	August 12, 2003	Unique Development	Vivendi Universal Games (Note: US release only.)	
Futurama	Xbox	August 12, 2003	Unique Development	Vivendi Universal Games	
Hoyle Majestic Chess	Microsoft Windows	August 15, 2003	Fluent Entertainment / Sidhe Interactive	Sierra	
Barbie Beauty Boutique	Microsoft Windows	August 22, 2003	Vivendi Universal Games	Vivendi Universal Games	
Rescue Heroes: Billy Blazes	Game Boy Advance	August 22, 2003	WayForward Technologies	Vivendi Universal Games	
Buffy the Vampire Slayer: Chaos Bleeds	GameCube	August 26, 2003	Eurocom	Vivendi Universal Games (NA); Sierra (PAL)	
Buffy the Vampire Slayer: Chaos Bleeds	PlayStation 2	August 26, 2003	Eurocom	Vivendi Universal Games (NA); Sierra (PAL)	
Buffy the Vampire Slayer: Chaos Bleeds	Xbox	August 26, 2003	Eurocom	Vivendi Universal Games (NA); Sierra (PAL)	
Hoyle Casino 2004	Microsoft Windows	September 2, 2003	Unknown	Sierra	
Hoyle Table Games 2004	Microsoft Windows	September 2, 2003	Buzz Monkey Software	Sierra	
Hunter: The Reckoning - Wayward	PlayStation 2	September 9, 2003	High Voltage Software	Vivendi Universal Games (NA); Sierra (PAL)	
The Simpsons: Hit & Run	GameCube	September 16, 2003	Radical Entertainment	Vivendi Universal Games (NA); Sierra (PAL)	
The Simpsons: Hit & Run	PlayStation 2	September 16, 2003	Radical Entertainment	Vivendi Universal Games (NA); Sierra (PAL)	
The Simpsons: Hit & Run	Xbox	September 16, 2003	Radical Entertainment	Vivendi Universal Games (NA); Sierra (PAL)	
Homeworld 2	Microsoft Windows	September 16, 2003	Relic Entertainment	Sierra	
Barbie Horse Adventures: Blue Ribbon Race	Game Boy Advance	September 17, 2003	Blitz Games / Möbius Entertainment	Vivendi Universal Games	
Jurassic Park: Dinosaur Battles	Microsoft Windows	September 17, 2003	Knowledge Adventure	Knowledge Adventure	
Spyro: Attack of the Rhynocs	Game Boy Advance	October 27, 2003	Digital Eclipse	Universal Interactive	
Hunter: The Reckoning – Redeemer	Xbox	October 28, 2003	High Voltage Software	Vivendi Universal Games (NA); Sierra (EU)	
SWAT: Global Strike Team	PlayStation 2	October 28, 2003	Argonaut Games	Sierra	
SWAT: Global Strike Team	Xbox	October 28, 2003	Argonaut Games	Sierra	
Barbie Horse Adventures: Wild Horse Rescue	PlayStation 2	November 4, 2003	Blitz Games	Vivendi Universal Games	
Barbie Horse Adventures: Wild Horse Rescue	Xbox	November 4, 2003	Blitz Games	Vivendi Universal Games	
Dr. Seuss' The Cat in the Hat	Microsoft Windows	November 4, 2003	Digital Eclipse	Vivendi Universal Games (NA); Coktel (EU)	
Dr. Seuss' The Cat in the Hat	PlayStation 2	November 4, 2003	Magenta Software	Vivendi Universal Games (NA); Coktel (EU)	
Dr. Seuss' The Cat in the Hat	Xbox	November 4, 2003	Magenta Software	Vivendi Universal Games (NA); Coktel (EU)	
The Lord of the Rings: War of the Ring	Microsoft Windows	November 4, 2003	Liquid Entertainment	Sierra	
Crash Nitro Kart	Game Boy Advance	November 11, 2003	Vicarious Visions	Universal Interactive	
Crash Nitro Kart	GameCube	November 11, 2003	Vicarious Visions / Driver-Inter	Universal Interactive	
Crash Nitro Kart	PlayStation 2	November 11, 2003	Vicarious Visions / Driver-Inter	Universal Interactive	
Crash Nitro Kart	Xbox	November 11, 2003	Vicarious Visions / Driver-Inter	Universal Interactive	
Contract J.A.C.K.	Microsoft Windows	November 11, 2003	Monolith Productions	Sierra	
The Hobbit	Game Boy Advance	November 11, 2003	Saffire	Sierra	
The Hobbit	Microsoft Windows	November 11, 2003	The Fizz Factor	Sierra	
The Hobbit	GameCube	November 12, 2003	Inevitable Entertainment	Sierra	
The Hobbit	PlayStation 2	November 12, 2003	Inevitable Entertainment	Sierra	
The Hobbit	Xbox	November 12, 2003	Inevitable Entertainment	Sierra	
The Simpsons: Hit & Run	Microsoft Windows	November 11, 2003	Radical Entertainment	Vivendi Universal Games (NA); Sierra (PAL)	
Battlestar Galactica	PlayStation 2	November 18, 2003	Warthog Games	Universal Interactive	
Battlestar Galactica	Xbox	November 18, 2003	Warthog Games	Universal Interactive	
Metal Arms: Glitch in the System	GameCube	November 19, 2003	Swingin' Ape Studios	Sierra	
Metal Arms: Glitch in the System	PlayStation 2	November 19, 2003	Mass Media Games	Sierra	
Metal Arms: Glitch in the System	Xbox	November 19, 2003	Swingin' Ape Studios	Sierra	
Barbie: Groovy Games	PlayStation	November 2003	Digital Illusions Canada	Vivendi Universal Games	
Shelly Club	Microsoft Windows	2003	Random Games	Vivendi Universal Games	

=== 2004 ===
Title	Platform(s)	Release date	Developer(s)	Label(s)	Reference(s)
The X-Files: Resist or Serve	PlayStation 2	March 16, 2004	Black Ops Entertainment / The Collective	Vivendi Universal Games (NA); Sierra (PAL)	
Lords of the Realm III	Microsoft Windows	March 17, 2004	Impressions Games	Sierra	
Counter-Strike: Condition Zero	Microsoft Windows	March 21, 2004	Valve, Turtle Rock Studios, Ritual Entertainment	Sierra	
Barbie Mermaid Adventure	Macintosh	March 2004	Vivendi Universal Games	Vivendi Universal Games	
Barbie Mermaid Adventure	Microsoft Windows	March 2004	Vivendi Universal Games	Vivendi Universal Games	
Van Helsing	Game Boy Advance	May 6, 2004	Saffire	Vivendi Universal Games (NA); Sierra (PAL)	
Van Helsing	PlayStation 2	May 6, 2004	Saffire	Vivendi Universal Games (NA); Sierra (PAL)	
Van Helsing	Xbox	May 6, 2004	Saffire	Vivendi Universal Games (NA); Sierra (PAL)	
The Chronicles of Riddick: Escape from Butcher Bay	Xbox	June 1, 2004	Starbreeze Studios	Vivendi Universal Games (NA); Sierra (PAL)	
Crash Bandicoot Purple and Spyro Orange	Game Boy Advance	June 3, 2004	Vicarious Visions	Vivendi Universal Games (NA); Coktel (EU)	
Ground Control II: Operation Exodus	Microsoft Windows	June 22, 2004	Massive Entertainment	Sierra	
Crash Nitro Kart	N-Gage	July 28, 2004	Vicarious Visions	Vivendi Universal Games	
Thunderbirds	Game Boy Advance	August 10, 2004	Saffire	Vivendi Universal Games	
Evil Genius	Microsoft Windows	September 28, 2004	Elixir Studios	Sierra	
Crash Twinsanity	PlayStation 2	September 28, 2004	Traveller's Tales	Vivendi Universal Games (NA); Sierra (PAL)	
Crash Twinsanity	Xbox	September 28, 2004	Traveller's Tales	Vivendi Universal Games (NA); Sierra (PAL)	
Leisure Suit Larry: Magna Cum Laude	Microsoft Windows	October 5, 2004	High Voltage Software	Sierra	
Leisure Suit Larry: Magna Cum Laude	PlayStation 2	October 5, 2004	High Voltage Software	Sierra	
Leisure Suit Larry: Magna Cum Laude	Xbox	October 5, 2004	High Voltage Software	Sierra	
Disney's Aladdin Chess Adventures	Microsoft Windows	October 5, 2004	Fluent Entertainment	Sierra	
Tribes: Vengeance	Microsoft Windows	October 5, 2004	Irrational Games	Sierra	
Men of Valor	Xbox	October 7, 2004	2015	Vivendi Universal Games (NA); Sierra (PAL)	
The Bard's Tale	PlayStation 2	October 26, 2004	InXile Entertainment	Vivendi Universal Games (Note: North American distribution only.)	
The Bard's Tale	Xbox	October 26, 2004	InXile Entertainment	Vivendi Universal Games	
Men of Valor	Microsoft Windows	October 28, 2004	2015	Vivendi Universal Games (NA); Sierra (PAL)	
Spyro: A Hero's Tail	GameCube	November 3, 2004	Eurocom	Vivendi Universal Games (NA); Sierra (PAL)	
Spyro: A Hero's Tail	PlayStation 2	November 3, 2004	Eurocom	Vivendi Universal Games (NA); Sierra (PAL)	
Spyro: A Hero's Tail	Xbox	November 3, 2004	Eurocom	Vivendi Universal Games (NA); Sierra (PAL)	
Half-Life 2	Microsoft Windows	November 16, 2004	Valve	Sierra	
Counter-Strike: Source	Microsoft Windows	November 16, 2004	Valve / Turtle Rock Studios	Sierra	
Fight Club	PlayStation 2	November 16, 2004	Genuine Games / Visual Sciences	Vivendi Universal Games (NA); Sierra (PAL)	
Fight Club	Xbox	November 16, 2004	Genuine Games / Visual Sciences	Vivendi Universal Games (NA); Sierra (PAL)	
The Chronicles of Riddick: Escape from Butcher Bay - Director's Cut	Microsoft Windows	December 8, 2004	Starbreeze Studios	Vivendi Universal Games (NA); Sierra (PAL)	
The Energy Thieves	Microsoft Windows	2004	Coktel Studio	Coktel	
The Energy Thieves	PlayStation 2	2004	Coktel Studio	Coktel	

=== 2005 ===
Title	Platform(s)	Release date	Developer(s)	Label(s)	Reference(s)
Nexus: The Jupiter Incident	Microsoft Windows	February 24, 2005	Mithis Games	Sierra	
Robots	Game Boy Advance	March 7, 2005	Griptonite	Sierra	
Robots	GameCube	March 7, 2005	Eurocom	Sierra	
Robots	Microsoft Windows	March 7, 2005	Eurocom	Sierra	
Robots	Nintendo DS	March 7, 2005	Griptonite	Sierra	
Robots	PlayStation 2	March 7, 2005	Eurocom	Sierra	
Robots	Xbox	March 7, 2005	Eurocom	Sierra	
Red Ninja: End of Honor	PlayStation 2	March 30, 2005	Tranji Studio	Vivendi Universal Games (NA); Sierra (PAL)	
Red Ninja: End of Honor	Xbox	March 30, 2005	Tranji Studio	Vivendi Universal Games (NA); Sierra (PAL)	
SWAT 4	Microsoft Windows	April 5, 2005	Irrational Games	Sierra	
Empire Earth II	Microsoft Windows	April 26, 2005	Mad Doc Software	Sierra	
Predator: Concrete Jungle	PlayStation 2	April 26, 2005	Eurocom	Vivendi Universal Games (NA); Sierra (PAL)	
Predator: Concrete Jungle	Xbox	April 26, 2005	Eurocom	Vivendi Universal Games (NA); Sierra (PAL)	
Cold Winter	PlayStation 2	May 11, 2005	Swordfish Studios	Sierra	
The Bard's Tale	Microsoft Windows	June 21, 2005	InXile Entertainment	Vivendi Universal Games (Note: North American distribution only.)	
FlatOut	Microsoft Windows	July 12, 2005	Bugbear Entertainment	Vivendi Universal Games	
FlatOut	PlayStation 2	July 12, 2005	Bugbear Entertainment	Vivendi Universal Games	
FlatOut	Xbox	July 12, 2005	Bugbear Entertainment	Vivendi Universal Games	
The Incredible Hulk: Ultimate Destruction	GameCube	August 23, 2005	Radical Entertainment	Sierra	
The Incredible Hulk: Ultimate Destruction	PlayStation 2	August 23, 2005	Radical Entertainment	Sierra	
The Incredible Hulk: Ultimate Destruction	Xbox	August 23, 2005	Radical Entertainment	Sierra	
Barbie and the Magic of Pegasus	Microsoft Windows	September 20, 2005	Blue Monkey Studios	Vivendi Universal Games	
Barbie and the Magic of Pegasus	Game Boy Advance	October 7, 2005	WayForward Technologies	Vivendi Universal Games	
F.E.A.R.	Microsoft Windows	October 17, 2005	Monolith Productions	Sierra	
Spyro: Shadow Legacy	Nintendo DS	October 18, 2005	Amaze Entertainment	Sierra	
Crash Tag Team Racing	GameCube	October 19, 2005	Radical Entertainment	Sierra	
Crash Tag Team Racing	PlayStation 2	October 19, 2005	Radical Entertainment	Sierra	
Crash Tag Team Racing	Xbox	October 20, 2005	Radical Entertainment	Sierra	
Crash Tag Team Racing	PlayStation Portable	November 10, 2005	Radical Entertainment	Sierra	
50 Cent: Bulletproof	PlayStation 2	November 17, 2005	Genuine Games	Vivendi Universal Games	
50 Cent: Bulletproof	Xbox	November 17, 2005	Genuine Games	Vivendi Universal Games	

=== 2006 ===
Title	Platform(s)	Release date	Developer(s)	Label(s)	Reference(s)
Empire Earth II: The Art of Supremacy	Microsoft Windows	February 14, 2006	Mad Doc Software	Sierra	
SWAT 4: The Stetchkov Syndicate	Microsoft Windows	February 28, 2006	Irrational Games	Sierra	
Ice Age 2: The Meltdown	Game Boy Advance	March 14, 2006	Amaze Entertainment	Sierra	
Ice Age 2: The Meltdown	Microsoft Windows	March 14, 2006	Eurocom	Sierra	
Ice Age 2: The Meltdown	Nintendo DS	March 14, 2006	Amaze Entertainment	Sierra	
Ice Age 2: The Meltdown	PlayStation 2	March 14, 2006	Eurocom	Sierra	
F.E.A.R.: Combat	Microsoft Windows	August 17, 2006	Monolith Productions	Sierra	
Joint Task Force	Microsoft Windows	September 12, 2006	Most Wanted Entertainment	Sierra	
Caesar IV	Microsoft Windows	September 26, 2006	Tilted Mill Entertainment	Sierra	
Scarface: Money. Power. Respect.	PlayStation Portable	October 6, 2006	FarSight Technologies	Sierra	
Scarface: The World Is Yours	PlayStation 2	October 8, 2006	Radical Entertainment	Sierra	
Crash Boom Bang!	Nintendo DS	October 10, 2006	Dimps, Hyde	Sierra	
Scarface: The World Is Yours	Microsoft Windows	October 10, 2006	Radical Entertainment	Sierra	
The Legend of Spyro: A New Beginning	GameCube	October 10, 2006	Krome Studios	Sierra	
The Legend of Spyro: A New Beginning	PlayStation 2	October 10, 2006	Krome Studios	Sierra	
The Legend of Spyro: A New Beginning	Xbox	October 10, 2006	Krome Studios	Sierra	
The Legend of Spyro: A New Beginning	Game Boy Advance	October 12, 2006	Big Ant Studios, Krome Studios	Sierra	
The Legend of Spyro: A New Beginning	Nintendo DS	October 17, 2006	Amaze Entertainment, Krome Studios	Sierra	
F.E.A.R.: Extraction Point	Microsoft Windows	October 24, 2006	TimeGate Studios / Monolith Productions	Sierra	
F.E.A.R.	Xbox 360	October 31, 2006	Day 1 Studios	Sierra	
Scarface: The World Is Yours	Xbox	October 2006	Radical Entertainment	Sierra	
Eragon	Nintendo DS	November 14, 2006	Amaze Entertainment	Sierra	
Eragon	Microsoft Windows	November 14, 2006	Stormfront Studios	Sierra	
Eragon	PlayStation 2	November 14, 2006	Stormfront Studios	Sierra	
Eragon	PlayStation Portable	November 14, 2006	Amaze Entertainment	Sierra	
Eragon	Xbox	November 14, 2006	Stormfront Studios	Sierra	
Eragon	Xbox 360	November 14, 2006	Stormfront Studios	Sierra	
Bass Pro Shops: Trophy Bass 2007	Microsoft Windows	November 17, 2006	Big John Games	Vivendi Universal Games	
Bass Pro Shops: Trophy Hunter 2007	Microsoft Windows	November 17, 2006	Jarhead Games	Vivendi Universal Games	
Bass Pro Shops: Trophy Hunter 2007	Xbox	November 17, 2006	Jarhead Games	Vivendi Universal Games	
Lawnmower Racing Mania 2007	Microsoft Windows	November 20, 2006	EV Interactive	Vivendi Universal Games	
Delta Force: Black Hawk Down – Team Sabre	PlayStation 2	November 21, 2006	Rebellion Developments	Sierra	
Ice Age 2: The Meltdown	Wii	December 5, 2006	Eurocom	Sierra	
Assault Heroes	Xbox Live Arcade	December 13, 2006	Wanako Studios	Sierra Online	
3D Ultra Mini Golf Adventures	Microsoft Windows	December 20, 2006	Wanako Studios	Sierra Online	
Bass Pro Shops: Trophy Bass 2007	Xbox	2006	Big John Games	Vivendi Universal Games	
DMZ: North Korea	Microsoft Windows	2006	Jarhead Games	Vivendi Games	
Outlaw Chopper	Microsoft Windows	2006	Jarhead Games	Vivendi Universal Games	

=== 2007 ===
Title	Platform(s)	Release date	Developer(s)	Label(s)	Reference(s)
M.A.C.H.: Modified Air Combat Heroes	PlayStation Portable	March 9, 2007	Kuju Surrey	Sierra	
3D Ultra Mini Golf Adventures	Xbox Live Arcade	April 18, 2007	Wanako Studios	Sierra Online	
3D Ultra Mini Golf Adventures: Carnival	Microsoft Windows	May 24, 2007	Wanako Studios	Sierra Online	
3D Ultra Mini Golf Adventures: Lost Island	Microsoft Windows	May 24, 2007	Wanako Studios	Sierra Online	
3D Ultra Mini Golf Adventures: Space	Microsoft Windows	May 24, 2007	Wanako Studios	Sierra Online	
3D Ultra Mini Golf Adventures: Wild West	Microsoft Windows	May 24, 2007	Wanako Studios	Sierra Online	
Scarface: The World Is Yours	Wii	June 12, 2007	Radical Entertainment	Sierra	
Switchball	Microsoft Windows	June 26, 2007	Atomic Elbow	Sierra Online	
Carcassonne	Xbox Live Arcade	June 27, 2007	Sierra Online Seattle, Sierra Online Shanghai	Sierra Online	
World in Conflict	Microsoft Windows	September 18, 2007	Massive Entertainment	Sierra	
Crash of the Titans	Game Boy Advance	October 2, 2007	Amaze Entertainment	Sierra	
Crash of the Titans	Nintendo DS	October 2, 2007	Amaze Entertainment	Sierra	
Crash of the Titans	PlayStation 2	October 2, 2007	Radical Entertainment	Sierra	
Crash of the Titans	Wii	October 2, 2007	Radical Entertainment	Sierra	
Crash of the Titans	Xbox 360	October 2, 2007	Radical Entertainment	Sierra	
The Legend of Spyro: The Eternal Night	Nintendo DS	October 2, 2007	Amaze Entertainment	Sierra	
The Legend of Spyro: The Eternal Night	PlayStation 2	October 2, 2007	Krome Studios, Big Ant Studios	Sierra	
The Legend of Spyro: The Eternal Night	Wii	October 2, 2007	Krome Studios, Big Ant Studios	Sierra	
The Legend of Spyro: The Eternal Night	Game Boy Advance	October 3, 2007	Amaze Entertainment	Sierra	
Crash of the Titans	PlayStation Portable	October 16, 2007	SuperVillain Studios	Sierra	
SWAT: Target Liberty	PlayStation Portable	October 16, 2007	3G Studios	Sierra	
Assault Heroes	Microsoft Windows	October 23, 2007	Wanako Studios	Sierra Online	
Battlestar Galactica	Microsoft Windows	October 23, 2007	Auran Games	Sierra Online	
Battlestar Galactica	Xbox Live Arcade	October 24, 2007	Auran Games	Sierra Online	
TimeShift	Microsoft Windows	October 30, 2007	Saber Interactive	Sierra	
TimeShift	PlayStation 3	October 30, 2007	Saber Interactive	Sierra	
TimeShift	Xbox 360	October 30, 2007	Saber Interactive	Sierra	
Empire Earth III	Microsoft Windows	November 6, 2007	Mad Doc Software	Sierra	
F.E.A.R.: Files	Xbox 360	November 6, 2007	Day:1:Studios	Sierra	
F.E.A.R.: Perseus Mandate	Microsoft Windows	November 6, 2007	TimeGate Studios, Monolith Productions	Sierra	
Switchball	Xbox Live Arcade	November 7, 2007	Atomic Elbow	Sierra Online	
Aliens vs Predator: Requiem	PlayStation Portable	November 13, 2007	Rebellion Developments	Sierra	
Geometry Wars: Galaxies	Wii	November 20, 2007	Kuju Surrey, Bizarre Creations	Sierra	
Geometry Wars: Galaxies	Nintendo DS	November 27, 2007	Kuju Surrey, Bizarre Creations	Sierra	
Arkadian Warriors	Xbox Live Arcade	December 12, 2007	Wanako Studios, Sierra Online Seattle	Sierra Online	

=== 2008 ===
Game	Platforms	Release date	Developer(s)	Brand	Note/source
Boogie Bunnies	Xbox 360 (Xbox Live Arcade)	January 16, 2008	Artech Studios	Sierra Online	
Boogie Bunnies	Microsoft Windows	May 12, 2008	Artech Studios	Sierra Online	
The Spiderwick Chronicles	PlayStation 2	February 5, 2008	Stormfront Studios	Sierra	
The Spiderwick Chronicles	Xbox 360	February 5, 2008	Stormfront Studios	Sierra	
The Spiderwick Chronicles	Wii	February 5, 2008	Stormfront Studios	Sierra	
The Spiderwick Chronicles	Microsoft Windows	February 5, 2008	Stormfront Studios	Sierra	
The Spiderwick Chronicles	Nintendo DS	February 5, 2008	Backbone Entertainment	Sierra	
Commanders: Attack of the Genos	Xbox 360 (Xbox Live Arcade)	February 13, 2008	SouthEnd Interactive	Sierra Online	
Lost Cities	Xbox 360 (Xbox Live Arcade)	April 23, 2008	Sierra Online Shanghai	Sierra Online	
Assault Heroes 2	Xbox 360 (Xbox Live Arcade)	May 14, 2008	Wanako Studios	Sierra Online	
Commanders: Attack of the Genos	Microsoft Windows	May 2008	SouthEnd Interactive	Sierra Online	
Robert Ludlum's The Bourne Conspiracy	PlayStation 3	June 3, 2008	High Moon Studios	Sierra	
Robert Ludlum's The Bourne Conspiracy	Xbox 360	June 3, 2008	High Moon Studios	Sierra	
Aces of the Galaxy	Microsoft Windows	June 4, 2008	Artech Studios	Sierra Online	
Aces of the Galaxy	Xbox 360 (Xbox Live Arcade)	June 4, 2008	Artech Studios	Sierra Online	
Sea Life Safari	Xbox 360 (Xbox Live Arcade)	June 18, 2008	Wanako Studios	Sierra Online	
The Mummy: Tomb of the Dragon Emperor	PlayStation 2	July 22, 2008	Eurocom	Sierra	
The Mummy: Tomb of the Dragon Emperor	Wii	July 22, 2008	Eurocom	Sierra	
The Mummy: Tomb of the Dragon Emperor	Nintendo DS	July 22, 2008	Artificial Mind & Movement	Sierra	
Gin Rummy	Xbox 360 (Xbox Live Arcade)	September 3, 2008	Sierra Online Shanghai	Sierra Online	
Crash: Mind over Mutant	PlayStation 2	October 7, 2008	Radical Entertainment	Activision (NA); Sierra (PAL)	Published by Vivendi Games in Europe only.
Crash: Mind over Mutant	Wii	October 7, 2008	Radical Entertainment	Activision (NA); Sierra (PAL)	Published by Vivendi Games in Europe only.
Crash: Mind over Mutant	Xbox 360	October 7, 2008	Radical Entertainment	Activision (NA); Sierra (PAL)	Published by Vivendi Games in Europe only.
Crash: Mind over Mutant	PlayStation Portable	October 7, 2008	Virtuos	Activision (NA); Sierra (PAL)	Published by Vivendi Games in Europe only.
Crash: Mind over Mutant	Nintendo DS	October 7, 2008	TOSE	Activision (NA); Sierra (PAL)	Published by Vivendi Games in Europe only.
The Legend of Spyro: Dawn of the Dragon	PlayStation 2	October 21, 2008	Étranges Libellules	Activision (NA); Sierra (PAL)	Published by Vivendi Games in Europe only.
The Legend of Spyro: Dawn of the Dragon	Wii	October 21, 2008	Étranges Libellules	Activision (NA); Sierra (PAL)	Published by Vivendi Games in Europe only.
The Legend of Spyro: Dawn of the Dragon	PlayStation 3	October 21, 2008	Étranges Libellules	Activision (NA); Sierra (PAL)	Published by Vivendi Games in Europe only.
The Legend of Spyro: Dawn of the Dragon	Xbox 360	October 21, 2008	Étranges Libellules	Activision (NA); Sierra (PAL)	Published by Vivendi Games in Europe only.
The Legend of Spyro: Dawn of the Dragon	Nintendo DS	October 21, 2008	Tantalus Media	Activision (NA); Sierra (PAL)	Published by Vivendi Games in Europe only.

=== 2009 ===
Game	Platforms	Release date	Developer(s)	Brand	Note/source
Red Baron: Arcade	PlayStation 3 (PlayStation Network)	March 12, 2009	Stainless Games	Sierra Online	
Zombie Wranglers	Xbox 360 (Xbox Live Arcade)	May 6, 2009	Frozen Codebase	Sierra Online	

=== Vivendi Games Mobile ===
Game	Platforms	Release date	Developer(s)	Note/source
2-in-1 Brain Teaser	J2ME			
Alone: The Horror Begins	J2ME	2007		
Amy's Jigsaw Scrapbook	J2ME	March 17, 2006	Centerscore (Back catalogue)	
Aquarium Pets	J2ME	2006	Centerscore (Back catalogue)	
Black Hawk Down: Team Sabre	J2ME	September 2006		
The Bourne Conspiracy	J2ME	June 2008		
The Bourne Ultimatum	J2ME	August 8, 2007		
Caesar	J2ME	2006		
Cake Mania 2	J2ME	July 2008	Centerscore	
Crash Boom Bang!/Crash Bandicoot Party Games	J2ME	July 2008		
Crash Bandicoot Nitro Kart	J2ME	April 2008		
Crash Nitro Kart 2	J2ME	June 2008	IP4U	
Crash Bandicoot Nitro Kart 3D	Symbian, iPhone OS	April 2008 (Symbian); July 9, 2008 (iPhone OS)	Polarbit	
Crash Racing	J2ME	November 2005 (archive title)		(Note: Originally published by WonderPhone.)
Crash of the Titans	J2ME	November 2007	Devalley Entertainment	
Delta Force	J2ME	September 27, 2007		
Empire Earth	J2ME	October 14, 2005 (Archive)		(Note: Originally published by WonderPhone.)
Eragon	J2ME	January 11, 2007	Kaolink	
Ghostbusters: Ghost Trap	J2ME	October 2008		
The Incredible Machine	J2ME	June 6, 2007		
Leisure Suit Larry: Love for Sail	J2ME	2007	The Mighty Troglodytes	
The Legend of Spyro: A New Beginning	J2ME	October 2006	The Mighty Troglodytes	
The Legend of Spyro: The Eternal Night	J2ME	October 2007	The Mighty Troglodytes	
The Legend of Spyro: Dawn of the Dragon	J2ME	November 2008	The Mighty Troglodytes	
Prison Break	J2ME	2008		
Pub Darts 180	J2ME	February 5, 2008	FinBlade	
SWAT: Elite Troops	J2ME	March 1, 2008	Rovio Entertainment	
Wordox: Word Snatcher	J2ME	April 23, 2008		
