= Jet Li: Rise to Honor =

2004 action-adventure video game

- EU, UK and Australian box art
- Developer: Sony Computer Entertainment America
- Publisher: Sony Computer Entertainment
- Producer: Jim Wallace
- Designer: Tetsuya Iijima
- Programmer: Bill Willis
- Artist: Julian Liao
- Composer: Raymond Wong
- Platform: PlayStation 2
- Release: NA: February 17, 2004; EU: April 8, 2004
- Genres: Action-adventure, third-person shooter
- Mode: Single-player

Jet Li: Rise to Honor is an action-adventure video game developed and published by Sony Computer Entertainment for the PlayStation 2. It was originally released in 2004. The game features the likeness, voice acting and motion capture work of martial arts actor Jet Li, and features martial arts choreography by Corey Yuen. It is notable for being the only game fully developed at Sony Computer Entertainment America's Foster City headquarters, which handles publishing duties in North America to this day.

== Gameplay ==
Rise to Honor features a cinematic presentation designed to mimic an action film, with no loading screens and sections of the game split up into "scenes". A DVD-like chapter selection menu allows the player to go back to any past scenes once they have been cleared previously.

Played from a third-person perspective, the majority of the game is a beat 'em up, with the player using the right analog stick to direct blows at enemies, similar to the Xbox game Star Wars: Obi-Wan. The game also features a number of levels where the player uses firearms with unlimited ammunition. During levels, the player constantly builds up a store of adrenaline, which the player can unleash to perform powerful hand-to-hand combat strikes. An alternative is, when using firearms, the player initiates a temporary bullet time mode similar to the video game Max Payne. During the firearm scenes, the player can take cover behind various objects such as garbage cans or walls.

== Plot ==
The game follows Kit Yun (Jet Li), an undercover Hong Kong police officer who is assigned as a bodyguard to Boss Chiang, a friend of Kit's father. A year into Kit's undercover assignment, Boss Chiang decides to leave the life of organized crime, but not without getting outraged protests by Kwan, one of his associates, only to have various gang members attempt the assassination of Boss Chiang. Despite Kit's efforts, Boss Chiang gets assassinated by a mysterious sniper.

During Chiang's dying moments, he tells Kit to deliver an envelope containing information about the crime syndicate to his estranged daughter, Michelle. Being a childhood friend of Michelle's, Kit obliges and heads for San Francisco to deliver the message to her, despite whatever obstacles come in his way.

In San Francisco, Kit meets up with Chi, friend of Kit and Michelle's. While being pursued by thugs led by local gang boss Billy Soon, Kit and Chi successfully manage to regroup with Michelle only to end up being held captive by Billy. Kit eventually learns that Kwan hired Billy to find the envelope and that Billy is ordered to execute the three of them. Kit and Chi manage to escape captivity, defeat Billy, and free Michelle. After a melee fight, a defeated Billy attempts to shoot Michelle with his handgun, only for Chi to use his body as a human shield, which enrages Kit to kill him. Shortly after Chi succumbs to his gunshot wound, Michelle is resolved to return to Hong Kong and put an end to Kwan's activities.

Shortly after returning to Hong Kong, Michelle gets wounded by a Korean sniper Won Jang in the Cheng Chau harbor, while Kit pursues and kills Jang. Shortly after transporting Michelle to a local hospital, Michelle gets kidnapped by Kwan's henchmen, while Kit attempts to pursue her. Kit's pursuit leads him to a skyscraper building previously owned by Boss Chiang, where he fights and shoots his way through scores of Kwan's henchmen. Kit eventually defeats Kwan in hand-to-hand combat, but during an attempt to arrest Kwan, Kwan attempts to shoot Kit's superior officer, Victor Lau, only for Kit to disarm him and Victor firing fatal shots to Kwan's chest.

While holding a private funeral for Boss Chiang, Victor approaches the pair, demanding the pair to burn down the documents. Victor then reveals that he was responsible for the deaths of Chiang and Kit's father, as well as profiteering from the crime syndicate. Shortly after having burned down an envelope, Kit reveals a wire containing Victor's confession and promptly beats Victor in hand-to-hand combat. Victor is taken into H.K.P.D. custody while Kit and Michelle have a brief discussion about Victor living and their fathers being dead, just as Kit reveals to Michelle that he had secretly hid Chiang's real envelope elsewhere safe without anyone else knowing and replaced with the fake envelope which was burned recently to confirm Victor's suspicions. Once Kit gave the Chiang's real envelope to Michelle, Kit concludes the discussion saying "It is better to die with honor than to live without."

== References to Li's films ==
Being a Jet Li video game, the game features several references to Li's previous movies. Some examples include:

- A gas mask chamber while fighting Kwan, in which Kit has to grab Kwan's gas mask to restore his own air supply, which is a reference to the final fight in The Bodyguard from Beijing and Black Mask.
- Kit having an option to use mobile stretchers while shooting firearms from a supine position in the hospital stages is also most likely a reference to Black Mask, in which the protagonist does a similar stunt while commandeering a motorcycle. Several reviews also note the similarity of the level to the famous hospital gurney scene from the Hong Kong film Hard Boiled.
- Kit releasing his grip on a handrail and grabbing on to the next one in the floor below him, making a reference to the beginning of Cradle 2 the Grave.
- Kit fighting twin enemies before fighting the main villain is a reference to Kiss of the Dragon. In addition, the twin enemies are named Fei and Hung, most likely a subtle jab at the folk hero Wong Fei Hung, which Li played in the Once Upon a Time in China series.
- Kit breaking Billy Soon's neck with his legs in a similar fashion from Lethal Weapon 4.
- Kit having the option to team up with Michelle for a fight in the Metreon is inspired by Jet Li and Aaliyah's fight scene against Françoise Yip in Romeo Must Die.
- Two unlockable skins: Wong Fei Hung and Chen Zen from Fist of Legend.
- Kit is also the name of Li's character in the 1994 film Meltdown.

== Reception ==
Reception

Aggregate score
Aggregator	Score
Metacritic	68/100

Review scores
Publication	Score
Electronic Gaming Monthly	6.33/10
Eurogamer	5/10
Game Informer	7/10
GamePro	5/5
GameRevolution	D+
GameSpot	6.6/10
GameSpy	2/5
GameZone	6.4/10
IGN	5.8/10
Official U.S. PlayStation Magazine	3/5
The Cincinnati Enquirer	3.5/5
Entertainment Weekly	B

The game received "average" reviews according to video game review aggregator Metacritic.

Playboy gave the game a score of 88% and said, "This isn't a game you replay ad infinitum; it's a story you experience. When you finish, you may stick it on the shelf and never touch it again, like a good book. But that doesn't mean it's not a fun read." Entertainment Weekly gave it a B and stated that "Each level features a remarkable cinematic flair and big-budget stunts, but the game's ill-conceived control scheme can be frustrating." However, The Cincinnati Enquirer gave it three-and-a-half stars out of five and said that “Controlling Yun is actually quite intuitive, even with the sophisticated multidirectional fighting scheme."

== See also ==
- Jackie Chan Stuntmaster
- Stranglehold, starring Chow Yun-fat
- Bruce Lee: Quest of the Dragon
