= Edward Kramer (disambiguation) =

Edward Kramer may refer to:

- Edward A. Kramer, computer graphics pioneer
- Edward E. Kramer, American editor and convicted child molester

== See also ==
- Eddie Kramer, British audio engineer and producer
- Edward Kramer Emerson, Canadian Football League player
- Edward Kramer Thompson, American writer and editor
