= Bruce Lee: Quest of the Dragon =

2002 video game

- North American cover art
- Developer: Ronin Entertainment
- Publisher: Universal Interactive
- Directors: Terrence Masson; Edward Kilham; Kalani Streicher
- Designers: Edward Kilham; James Teal
- Programmer: Scott Henderson
- Writers: Sean Hoessli; Terrence Masson
- Composer: Rik Schaffer
- Platform: Xbox
- Release: NA: July 2, 2002; EU: September 6, 2002
- Genre: Beat 'em up
- Mode: Single-player

Bruce Lee: Quest of the Dragon is a beat 'em up video game featuring martial artist Bruce Lee. It was developed by Ronin Entertainment and published by Universal Interactive. It was released in Europe and the United States for the Xbox in 2002 to a negative critical reception. A planned sequel was cancelled.

== Gameplay ==
Bruce Lee: Quest of the Dragon is a pure beat 'em up, using a 3D graphics engine and consisting of a normal section where the player is brawling against multiple common enemies, and of one-on-one boss fights. New Jeet Kune Do-style moves can be purchased for the coins gained by beating up enemies.

== Plot ==
The game features a story line in which 24-year-old Bruce battles multiple enemies to rescue his kidnapped father and retrieve the mystical Golden Relic from an organized crime organization known as Black Lotus, led by a mysterious "Dragon Lady", whose father Chai Wan was inadvertently killed by Lee. Players control Lee through a series of areas set in various locations around the world, including Hong Kong, London and San Francisco. The game's bosses include Dragon Lady's sisters, including Cleopatra and Rhianna, and her other followers, such as Cobra and female ninja assassin Tsuki.

== Development ==
On May 17, 2001, Microsoft announced an exclusive partnership with Universal Interactive to publish Bruce Lee games for the Xbox.

== Reception ==
Reception

Aggregate score
Aggregator	Score
Metacritic	32/100

Review scores
Publication	Score
AllGame	1.5/5
Electronic Gaming Monthly	2/10
EP Daily	4.5/10
Game Informer	1/10
GameRevolution	D−
GameSpot	3.1/10
GameZone	4.8/10
IGN	3.9/10
Official Xbox Magazine (US)	3/10
TeamXbox	5/10
X-Play	1/5

The game received "unfavorable" reviews according to the review aggregation website Metacritic. The most often cited complaints were about inadequate controls and combat lock-on system, low-quality graphics, frequent loading times, bad plot and voice acting, and the lack of any in-game tutorials. IGN regarded Quest of the Dragon as vastly inferior to the Game Boy Advance game Bruce Lee: Return of the Legend. GamePro said, "The game itself quickly bogs down into a long, repetitive walk-and-punch beat-em-up game." (Note: GamePro gave the game 4/5 for graphics, two 2.5/5 scores for sound and fun factor, and 3.5/5 for control.)

The game was nominated for the "Worst Game on Xbox" award at GameSpot's Best and Worst of 2002 Awards, which went to Gravity Games Bike: Street Vert Dirt.

In 2011, UGO.com included it in their list of 102 worst video games ever created, calling it "as close to blasphemy as the fighting genre gets."

== See also ==
- Dragon: The Bruce Lee Story
- Jackie Chan Stuntmaster
- Jet Li: Rise to Honor
- Stranglehold, starring Chow Yun-fat
