= Woody Woodpecker Racing (GBC video game) =

2000 video game

- Developer: Konami
- Publisher: Konami
- Director: Tadaaki Tsunashima
- Producer: Yutaka Haruki
- Designers: Tatsuto Yabe; Yoko Suzuki
- Programmers: Tadaaki Tsunashima; Ken Kudo; Akihiro Yamane; Masashi Endo
- Composer: Junichiro Kaneda
- Platform: Game Boy Color
- Release: NA: December 12, 2000
- Genre: Kart racing
- Modes: Single-player, multiplayer

Woody Woodpecker Racing is a 2000 kart racing game developed and published by Konami for the Game Boy Color. It features characters from the Woody Woodpecker franchise and offers a variety of gameplay modes and tracks. The game, as well as its PlayStation and PC counterpart, was the result of a partnership between Konami and Universal Interactive that allowed Konami to distribute and market video games based on Universal Studios franchises. It received mixed reviews, with some praise going to its depth and polish, mixed assessments of its difficulty and criticism toward its slow pace.

== Gameplay ==
Woody Woodpecker driving behind Chilly Willy. The heads-up display at the bottom of the screen indicates race information (clockwise from bottom left): race position, laps, race time, race position, and items collected.

Woody Woodpecker Racing is a kart racing game featuring ten characters from the titular Walter Lantz cartoon series, including Woody Woodpecker, Chilly Willy, and Buzz Buzzard. Viewed from an overhead isometric perspective, the game features four gameplay modes: "Extreme", "Grand Prix", "Sprint", and "Time Attack". Extreme is a tournament-style mode where players compete against five AI opponents across three to five courses per cup. Winning cups unlocks new parts, karts, and characters. The mode focuses on elimination or placement, with the goal of securing first place. Grand Prix is a points-based tournament where players earn points based on their finishing position across multiple races. The racer with the highest cumulative points wins. Similar to Extreme, it spans multiple cups and tracks. Sprint is a single-race option on any unlocked course, while in Time Trial, players race to achieve the fastest lap time on a chosen track. Ghost images of top performances can be saved and traded via the Game Link Cable for competitive challenges.

The game features 16 tracks spanning a number of themes. The tracks include interactive elements such as ramps and panels that provide speed boosts, as well as various obstacles. The tracks feature item panels that provide random power-ups that can be used to attack opponents or gain advantages. Such power-ups include fireworks, homing missiles, rolling bombs, dumbbells, oil slicks, hops for clearing obstacles, turbo boosts, and potions that provide temporary invincibility. The characters' karts are rated for speed, acceleration, and grip, and can be upgraded with parts earned through winning cups, improving attributes like engine, turbo, tires, suspension, defense, and jump length. Character-specific special parts can also be unlocked. Six initial characters — Woody and his family, Wally Walrus and Smedley — are available, with four additional racers — Chilly Willy, Ms. Meanie, Buzz Buzzard, and Dapper Denver Dooley — unlockable through strong performance across modes.

== Development and release ==
In December 1999, Universal Studios and Konami announced a global strategic alliance that would allow Konami to distribute and market video games produced and developed by Universal Interactive Studios based on Universal Studios franchises, including Woody Woodpecker. Konami developed the Game Boy Color version of Woody Woodpecker Racing, with Tadaaki Tsunashima as director and Yutaka Haruki as producer. Tatsuto Yabe and Yoko Suzuki designed the game while the programming team consisted of Tsunashima, Ken Kudo, Akihiro Yamane and Masashi Endo. The audio was created by Junichiro Kaneda. The game was released in North America on December 12, 2000.

== Reception ==
Reception

Aggregate score
Aggregator	Score
GameRankings	85.33%

Review scores
Publication	Score
Computer and Video Games	2/5
GameSpot	9.1/10
IGN	8/10
Pocket Games	3.5/10

Woody Woodpecker Racing received mixed reviews from critics, but received an aggregate score of 85.33% from GameRankings based primarily on the positive reviews by Frank Provo of GameSpot and Marc Nix of IGN. The two viewed the game as the best in its niche for its depth and polish. Provo framed the game as a trailblazer, being the first kart racer on the Game Boy Color after a long absence of the genre, and predicted it would remain the best due to its comprehensive features. Nix praised it as an example of the surprising quality of Konami's Game Boy Color output compared to their disappointing PlayStation efforts. Computer and Video Games (CVG) and Pocket Games were more negative in their assessments, finding the game lackluster. Pocket Games was particularly harsh, focusing on the failure to capture the speed and excitement of 3D kart racers, and deemed the game barely worth a rental.

Provo and Nix highlighted the depth of modes, diverse power-ups, and a battery backup for saving progress, and found the progression system of earning upgrades and unlocking characters engaging. Nix praised the integration of unlockable content in multiplayer and the Ghost lap feature for trading replays. CVG and Pocket Games found the single-player mode frustrating and unsatisfying, with CVG perceiving a lack of incentive to continue due to slow early races and unfair AI behavior. Pocket Games called the game a "yawner", criticizing sparse power-ups and uninspired track design.

The slow pace was criticized as undermining the excitement expected of a kart racer. Pocket Games described it as moving at the "pace of a crippled snail", and CVG called early races "painful slogs". Nix noted occasional slowdowns that briefly crippled performance but were rarely fatal to the gameplay.

The presentation was generally received positively, but was not considered groundbreaking. Provo and Nix praised the clear, varied track visuals and subtle interactive details like gravel and trackside animations. Provo highlighted the expressive character designs, with oversized heads and animated portraits reflecting race performance, while Nix criticized the character sprites as poorly drawn and unrecognizable, particularly for lesser-known characters like Chilly Willy. Provo admitted that the graphics could have pushed the hardware further, but was satisfied with the balance of personality and visibility. Nix noted minor localization issues with "Japanglish" text, which added unintentional humor but reflected a lack of polish.

Assessments of the difficulty were mixed. Provo and Nix appreciated the AI's menace, with Provo noting rivals' use of power-ups to maintain competition and Nix citing instances where AI leverages invincibility to target players. Nix, however, noted that the AI "isn't brilliant" due to its tendency of making avoidable mistakes. CVG complained that the rival racers seem to cheat, especially with timed attacks near race ends, creating frustration. Pocket Games found the difficulty diminished by the game's slow pace, making even complex tracks feel too easy.
