= Edward A. Kramer =

Edward A. "Ed" Kramer is a computer graphics pioneer who worked in computer-generated imagery (CGI). ACM SIGGRAPH, a Special Interest Group focused on computer graphics within the Association for Computing Machinery (ACM), recognizes him as a member of "SIGGRAPH Pioneers." As of 2024, he is chair of the SIGGRAPH Pioneers.

== Early life and education ==
Kramer was educated at Duke University, where he received a Bachelor of Science degree in psychology in 1977. He earned a Master of Arts in Film Production/Animation in 1981 at the University of Texas at Austin, where he'd done 3D vector animation in the physics lab for a local PBS series.

== Career ==
He worked as a professional CGI artist from 1981, with jobs in Hollywood, New York, Atlanta, and for NASA in Houston. In 1993, he worked as a CGI supervisor on the Secrets of the Luxor Pyramid trilogy of ride films for the Luxor Resort and Casino in Las Vegas. Between 1994 and 2006, he worked for Industrial Light & Magic in San Rafael as Senior Technical Director and Sequence Supervisor. He was one of the first users of many tools for video production, among them ADO, Via Video, Quantel paint systems, System IV, Bosch FGS-4000, Abekas, Wavefront, and digital videotape. In his film career, he worked on the computer graphics for six films nominated for Academy Award for Best Visual Effects, including the 2006 winner, Pirates of the Caribbean II: Dead Man's Chest, as well as Twister (1996), The Lost World: Jurassic Park (1997), Star Wars Episode I: The Phantom Menace (1999), The Perfect Storm (2000) and Star Wars Episode II: Attack of the Clones (2002). Kramer also worked in television, including for CBS Evening News, ABC Sports, HBO, Cinemax, Lifetime Cable Network, CNN and Coca-Cola. From 2010, he was an instructor of CGI Lighting, Modeling, Dynamics, and Portfolio Development at the Colorado Film School (now the Cinematic Arts Department of the Community College of Aurora, Colorado), before moving to the now defunct Art Institute of Colorado.

Kramer was an early participant in SIGGRAPH conferences, for instance as both course organizer and a presenter of "Computer Animation Using Video Techniques" in 1985, 1986, and 1987. As SIGGRAPH Pioneers Chair 2019–2024, he interviewed the SIGGRAPH Conference Chairs for 1979, 1980, 1988, 1991, 1992, 1996, 1997, 1999, 2003, 2010, 2012, 2013 and 2020, as well as chairing or participating in panels. These panels and interviews are preserved on video.

== Assessments ==
Kramer's importance in the development of computer graphics is attested by his capsule biography, one of only four, along with industry luminaries John Whitney Sr., David C. Evans and Ivan Sutherland, in Terrence Masson's "first and only detailed behind-the-scenes history about the people and companies that have formed today's industry." Masson himself, chairing the SIGGRAPH 2006 Computer Animation Festival, described the eight jurors whom he chose, including Kramer, as

people who've been deep in production for a long time... who've seen it all, having dwelt at the very highest levels of quality so long that our standards would be positively stratospheric.

An essay, "Who are the Siggraph Pioneers?" from 2024, answers that question in several paragraphs. Quoting: "Rather than sitting passively on the sidelines, they have influenced continued discoveries, developments, and the maturation of the industry. People like Ed Kramer, ..." followed by thirteen other names, "... and many more."

== Filmography ==
=== Visual effects (feature film) ===
- 101 Dalmatians (1996): Visual effects
- Twister (1996): Visual effects
- The Lost World: Jurassic Park (1997): Visual effects
- Deep Impact (1998): Visual effects
- The Mummy (1999): Digital effects supervisor^{ILM}
- Galaxy Quest (1999): CGI artist
- Star Wars: The Phantom Menace (1999): Visual effects^{ILM}
- The Mummy Returns (2001): Visual effects supervisor^{ILM}
- Star Wars: Attack of the Clones (2002): Visual effects^{ILM}
- Dreamcatcher (2003): CGI artist
- Van Helsing (2004): Digital effects^{ILM}
- Son of the Mask (2005): Computer graphics supervisor
- Herbie: Fully Loaded (2005): CGI artist

=== Animation (feature film) ===
- Clear and Present Danger (1994): Animator
- The Island (2005): Animation director

=== Art department (feature film) ===
- Jumanji (1995): Graphic artist
- Planet of the Apes (2001): Graphic artist^{ILM}
- Harry Potter and the Chamber of Secrets (2002): Computer graphics artist^{ILM}

=== Miscellaneous crew (feature film) ===
- Star Wars: Revenge of the Sith (2005): Digital effects artist
- Pirates of the Caribbean: Dead Man's Chest (2006): Digital effects artist^{ILM}

=== Other ===
- Secrets of the Luxor Pyramid trilogy In Search of the Obelisk, Luxor Live, Theater of Time (1993): CGI supervisor.
- Stargate (1994):
- The Perfect Storm (2000): Digital effects artist^{ILM}
- Chasing Ice (2012): Animation: Look development:

== Selected bibliography ==
- Kramer, Ed (September 1983). "Graphics and Animation — An Overview, Part I". E-ITV: 37 ff. ISSN 0046-1466. OCLC 9802994.; also listed as Educational & Industrial Television or Educational and Instructional Television
- Kramer, Ed (November 1983). "Graphics and Animation — An Overview, Part II". E-ITV: 35 ff. ISSN 0046-1466. OCLC 9802994.
- Kramer, Edward A. (1987). "Analog to Digital Conversion: A History of Computer Animation". Proceedings : NCGA's computer graphics '87 : eighth annual conference and exposition : v. 3. Technical sessions. National Computer Graphics Association. pp. 363 ff. ISBN 9780941514156. OCLC 1416203007.
- Fulton, Jim; Kramer, Ed (1 August 1997). "Can you ever be too thin?". netWorker. 1 (2). Association for Computing Machinery: 19–23. doi:10.1145/267290.267300.
- "From production artist to educator: preparing for the change". SIGGRAPH '14: ACM SIGGRAPH 2014 Panels. New York: Association for Computing Machinery. 10 August 2014. doi:10.1145/2614208. ISBN 978-1-4503-2959-0. OCLC 903236968.

== Notes ==
ILM. while working at Industrial Light & Magic.
