= The Mummy (video game) =

2000 video game

- Developers: Rebellion Developments (PC, PS); KCE Nagoya (GBC)
- Publishers: Konami; Universal Interactive Studios
- Platforms: Microsoft Windows, PlayStation, Game Boy Color
- Release: PlayStation: NA: November 16, 2000; EU: December 8, 2000; JP: January 25, 2001; Windows: NA: November 17, 2000; EU: December 15, 2000; Game Boy Color: JP: November 30, 2000; NA: December 6, 2000; EU: December 15, 2000
- Genre: Action-adventure
- Mode: Single-player

The Mummy is a 2000 action-adventure video game for PlayStation, Microsoft Windows and Game Boy Color based on the 1999 film of the same name. It was published by Konami.

A Dreamcast version was planned, but was cancelled for unknown reasons. The game was followed by The Mummy Returns in 2001, The Mummy: The Animated Series in 2002, and was later followed by The Mummy: Tomb of the Dragon Emperor in 2008.

== Gameplay ==
Set in Hamunaptra, there are 15 stages. There is also a bonus stage called "Cairo". Rick O'Connell is the main character, and the players have to defeat enemies such as Slave Mummies and Scarab Beetles.

== Reception ==
Reception

Aggregate scores
Aggregator	Score		
Aggregator	GBC	PC	PS
GameRankings	74%	50%	55%
Metacritic	N/A	46/100	55/100

Review scores
Publication	Score		
Publication	GBC	PC	PS
AllGame	N/A	2/5	2/5
Computer Games Strategy Plus	N/A	1.5/5	N/A
EP Daily	N/A	7.5/10	N/A
Famitsu	N/A	N/A	27/40
Game Informer	N/A	N/A	0.75/10
GameRevolution	N/A	N/A	F
GameSpot	7.6/10	N/A	5.6/10
IGN	8/10	5/10	5.5/10
Next Generation	N/A	N/A	3/5
Nintendo Power	6.5/10	N/A	N/A
Official U.S. PlayStation Magazine	N/A	N/A	2.5/5

The PlayStation version received "mixed" reviews, while the PC version received "generally unfavorable reviews", according to the review aggregation website Metacritic. David Chen of NextGen said that the former version was "a lot better than we could have expected – still not great, but not at all bad". In Japan, Famitsu gave the same console version a score of 27 out of 40. Nintendo Power gave the Game Boy Color version a mixed review, over a month before it was released Stateside.
