= Bass Pro Shops Trophy Hunter 2007 =

2006 video game

Bass Pro Shops: Trophy Hunter 2007
- Developer: Jarhead Games
- Publisher: Vivendi Universal Games
- Platforms: Xbox, Windows
- Release: NA: November 20, 2006

Bass Pro Shops: Trophy Hunter 2007 is a hunting game developed by Canadian studio Jarhead Games and released for the Xbox and PC on November 20, 2006.

== Animals ==
- Whitetail deer
- Grizzly bear
- Polar bear
- Musk ox

== Reception ==
Reception

Review score
Publication	Score
Official Xbox Magazine (US)	4/10

Official Xbox Magazine gave the game 4.0 out of 10 saying "Even if hunting is about communing with nature, Trophy Hunter reduces it to boredom" OGXbox.co.uk gave the game a 6.5 out of 10 and praises the realistic animal movement of the time, but criticizes the game for its dated graphics and not being beginner friendly.
