= Crash Bandicoot 2: N-Tranced =

2003 video game

- North American box art
- Developer: Vicarious Visions
- Publisher: Universal Interactive
- Producers: Mike Meischeid; Sean Krankel
- Designers: Luis Barriga; Chris Degnan; Tem Stellmach
- Programmers: Chris Pruett; Eric Caraszi; Nate Trost; Brian Sox; Viktor Kuzmin
- Artists: Steve Derrick; Yin Zhang; Theodore Bialek; Christopher Winters
- Composer: Shin'en Multimedia
- Series: Crash Bandicoot
- Platform: Game Boy Advance
- Release: NA: January 10, 2003; EU: March 14, 2003
- Genre: Platform
- Modes: Single-player, multiplayer

Crash Bandicoot 2: N-Tranced is a 2003 platform game developed by Vicarious Visions and published by Universal Interactive for the Game Boy Advance. It is the sequel to Crash Bandicoot: The Huge Adventure and the eighth installment in the Crash Bandicoot video game series. The game's plot follows Crash Bandicoot as he sets out to foil the universe-conquering plans of Doctor Nefarious Tropy and free his brainwashed friends from the clutches of the evil N. Trance.

Crash Bandicoot 2: N-Tranced features side-scrolling levels and quasi-3D chase sequences as well as isometric stages in which the player must navigate by rolling a metallic sphere. Multiplayer modes are also available via the Game Link Cable. The game was received positively by critics, who praised the level variety and presentation, but criticized the gameplay for being largely identical to The Huge Adventure.

== Gameplay ==
An example of gameplay in Crash Bandicoot 2: N-Tranced

Crash Bandicoot 2: N-Tranced is a side-scrolling platform game in which the player controls Crash Bandicoot, who must rescue his brainwashed friends from Doctor Nefarious Tropy and N. Trance. Crash navigates through the game's levels by running, jumping, spinning (a tornado-like attack used to defeat enemies and break crates), sliding (to pass under obstacles or attack), and body slamming (to break open tough crates). These moves are available from the start, with a tutorial level to teach them. Within each level, the player guides Crash to collect Wumpa Fruit (100 for an extra life), smash crates (for items, power-ups, or lives), and reach the Crystal at the level's end to progress. Breaking all crates in a level grants the player a clear Gem, while Gem Shards of different colors are hidden within certain levels; collecting all shards of the same color unlocks a special level.

Relics can be won by re-entering a level where the Crystal has already been retrieved. To obtain a Relic, the player must initiate the Time Trial mode and race through a level in the pre-designated time displayed before entering a level. To begin a Time Trial run, the player must enter a level and touch the floating stopwatch near the beginning of the level to activate the timer; if the stopwatch is not touched, the level can be played regularly. The player must then race through the level as quickly as possible. Scattered throughout the level are yellow crates with the numbers 1, 2 or 3 on them. When these crates are broken, the timer is frozen for the number of seconds designated by the box. Sapphire, Gold and Platinum Relics can be won depending on the player's final time.

As the player progresses, Crash unlocks upgraded moves by defeating bosses, including a super-high leap for accessing elevated areas, a longer spin with temporary floating ability, a faster extended slide to smash multiple crates or cover distance, and a speed boost for faster ground movement. These enhancements allow access to previously inaccessible areas.

Some crates provide temporary abilities, such as the Copter Crate, which grants a helicopter pack for hovering around levels, and the Magic Carpet Crate, which enables brief horizontal-scrolling shooter sequences. Other crates include hazardous explosive TNT and Nitro Crates, Aku Aku Crates that provide protection from enemies, and Checkpoint Crates from which Crash can respawn after losing a life.

While the majority of the game's levels involve side-scrolling platforming, other types of levels are interspersed throughout. Some levels feature a quasi-3D presentation and involve Crash wakeboarding to escape a shark or Coco Bandicoot flying through space to escape a solar flare. Other levels involve Crunch Bandicoot rolling through isometric environments inside a metallic sphere named an Atlas Sphere, smashing crates and avoiding hazards and pitfalls. The levels are selected from a nonlinear overhead map, with branching paths unlocking as Crystals are collected. Many levels include hidden platforms that lead to bonus stages.

Crash Bandicoot 2: N-Tranced features two multiplayer modes accessible via two cartridges and a Game Link Cable. In the "Atlas Sphere" mode, which is further divided into "King of the Hill" and "Domination" challenges, two players roll Atlas Spheres to push each other into hazards or off ledges. In the "Level Race" mode, two players race through single-player levels against a ghost of their opponent, aiming for the fastest time. Linking with Crash Bandicoot: The Huge Adventure unlocks additional characters and levels for multiplayer.

== Plot ==
After the failure of Doctor Neo Cortex's previous scheme to shrink the Earth, (Note: As depicted in Crash Bandicoot: The Huge Adventure (2002)) Uka Uka entrusts Doctor Nefarious Tropy with aiding him in universal domination. Tropy peers into the future and sees the Bandicoots standing alongside him. Believing that controlling the Bandicoots will end their interference, he recruits N. Trance, a hypnotism specialist, to kidnap the Bandicoots and bring them to his side. Coco and Crunch Bandicoot are abducted and Crash is narrowly rescued by Aku Aku. A strange clone of Crash named Fake Crash winds up taking his place, but neither Tropy nor Trance seem to notice, and Trance successfully hypnotizes the Bandicoots into doing his bidding. Crash and Aku Aku navigate hyperspace and free Coco and Crunch from N. Trance's control. After Crash defeats Fake Crash, Tropy and Trance realize their error, but are assured that the Bandicoots will never find their hideout. Regardless, Crash finds them and defeats Trance as well as Tropy after a long and arduous battle. The Bandicoots celebrate with a photo that fulfills Tropy's vision, while Uka Uka vows a real adversary.

== Development and release ==
Crash Bandicoot 2: N-Tranced was developed by Vicarious Visions and published by Universal Interactive, with Vicarious Visions' Mike Meischeid and Universal Interactive's Sean Krankel serving as producers. The game was designed by Chris Degnan, Tem Stellmach and Luis Barriga. The programming team consisted of Chris Pruett, Eric Caraszi, Nate Trost, Brian Sox and Viktor Kuzmin. The graphics were created by Steve Derrick, Yin Zhang, Theodore Bialek and Christopher Winters. The audio was created by Shin'en Multimedia. The game was released in North America on January 10, 2003, and in Europe on March 14, 2003.

== Reception ==
Reception

Aggregate score
Aggregator	Score
Metacritic	75/100

Review scores
Publication	Score
AllGame	3.5/5
Electronic Gaming Monthly	6.5/10
Eurogamer	6/10
Game Informer	7.5/10
GamePro	4/5
GameSpot	7.3/10
GameSpy	78/100
GameZone	8.3/10
IGN	8.5/10
Jeuxvideo.com	15/20
X-Play	3/5

Award
Publication	Award
IGN	GBA Game of the Month

N-Tranced received "generally positive" reviews from critics according to Metacritic. Lisa Mason of Game Informer, Eduardo Zacarias of GameZone and the staff of IGN deemed the game a dependable, fun platformer that would satisfy Crash fans with its polished execution and variety. Scott Alan Marriott of AllGame and Frank Provo of GameSpot said that the game's fast-paced arcade action and extras made it a solid GBA title. However, Avi Fryman of GameSpy and Justin Speer of Extended Play concluded that the game lacked the ambition of Mario or Sonic and failed to push the genre forward, with Kristan Reed of Eurogamer adding that it was unlikely to win new fans due to its formulaic approach and high price for the content offered.

IGN commended the game's recreation of the core Crash Bandicoot experience. The mix of side-scrolling platforming, chase sequences, and Atlas Sphere levels (which drew comparisons to Marble Madness) was appreciated for adding variety, with the Atlas Sphere stages often highlighted as a fun, skillful diversion, although Logan of Jeuxvideo.com felt they were somewhat protracted. Reed highlighted the boss fight against Fake Crash for its inventive design, and Provo credited the bonus stages for adding replayability.

Critics observed a lack of innovation, determining the game to be a rehash of previous Crash titles and other platformers. Reed and Electronic Gaming Monthly's Mark MacDonald found the side-scrolling levels repetitive and lacking variety in their core design. Some found the quality of the non-platforming modes to be inconsistent. IGN, MacDonald and GamePro's Fennec Fox criticized the unrealistic and slightly unpolished physics in the Atlas Sphere levels, and Fryman and MacDonald respectively described the magic carpet segments and outer space levels as awkward. Marriott and MacDonald commented on the game's short length, with Marriott considering its optional challenges an attempt at padding.

The presentation was seen as a strong point. The visuals were widely praised for their vibrant colors, smooth animations, and detailed environments, pushing the GBA’s capabilities. Provo and Speer echoed this sentiment despite finding the graphics less clean and artistic than the top-tier platformers. Marriott was particularly impressed by the wakeboarding sequences for their sense of scale and dynamic effects. IGN and Logan, while holding a positive opinion on the graphics, said that they were not a significant improvement over those of The Huge Adventure. Zacarias and IGN commended the audio, though IGN and Logan noted that the music can become repetitive. Mason and Provo considered the music unremarkable.

The plot and level themes were said to lack cohesion, with the settings not forming a unified whole. Mason and Marriott described the game as having no discernible plot, while Provo suggested that the game was less cohesive than its competitors. The jumps between unrelated level themes were regarded by Fryman and Mason as imaginative and entertaining if haphazard.

Critics enjoyed the multiplayer modes, especially the competitive Atlas Sphere challenges. Zacarias and Logan highlighted the connectivity with The Huge Adventure, which unlocks extra levels and characters. Reed lamented the requirement of multiple cartridges, which limited accessibility. Marriott found the Level Race mode less appealing, and Fryman deemed the lack of a radar in the Atlas Sphere battles a minor flaw.

Craig Harris of IGN named Crash Bandicoot 2: N-Tranced the GBA Game of the Month for January 2003 due to a lack of significant GBA releases that month, as most games were launched for the Christmas season or delayed to spring. Despite this, he praised the game's merits, noting that Vicarious Visions improved upon The Huge Adventure's design with new mechanics and better level designs. He added that while similar to its predecessor, the game remained a strong platformer, with the Atlas Sphere levels adding variety.
