= Woody Woodpecker Racing =

2000 video game

- European PlayStation cover art
- Developer: Syrox Developments
- Publisher: Konami
- Director: LX Rudis
- Producers: Derek Poon; Eveline Cureteau
- Programmers: Mark Gordon; Dan Leslie; Rob Brooks
- Artists: Steve Green; Jon Green; David Bland
- Composer: Matt Furniss
- Platforms: PlayStation, Windows
- Release: PlayStation: NA: November 15, 2000; EU: December 22, 2000; Windows: NA: November 26, 2000; EU: December 22, 2000
- Genre: Racing
- Modes: Single-player, multiplayer

Woody Woodpecker Racing is a 2000 kart racing video game developed by Syrox Developments and published by Konami for the PlayStation and Microsoft Windows. The game features characters from the Woody Woodpecker franchise in the context of a kart racing game.

== Gameplay ==
Woody Woodpecker Racing is a kart racing game in which the player controls characters from the Woody Woodpecker franchise, who drive in a variety of vehicles. While racing, the player can accelerate, steer, brake, hop or use weapons and power-ups with the game controller's analog stick and buttons. The game includes four single-player modes: "Quest Mode", "World Championship", "Time Trial", and "Single Race". In Quest Mode, the player chooses from a selection of six playable characters and competes in a succession of races, unlocking new tracks and characters as they progress. In World Championship, the player races in a league and earns points based on their ranking in each race; the racer with the highest points at the end of the league is the winner. In Time Trial, the player must achieve the best lap time in any given track, and in Single Race, the player can partake in a five-lap race on any track. The game includes a multiplayer mode in which two players compete head-to-head. Woody Woodpecker Racing initially includes six playable characters, with three additional characters being unlocked in Quest Mode.

== Development and release ==
In December 1999, Universal Studios and Konami announced a global strategic alliance that would allow Konami to distribute and market video games produced and developed by Universal Interactive Studios based on Universal Studios franchises, including Woody Woodpecker. The PlayStation version was developed by Syrox Developments under the direction of Konami of America's LX Rudis, with Syrox's Derek Poon and Universal Interactive Studios' Eveline Cureteau acting as producers. The game was programmed by Mark Gordon, Dan Leslie and Rob Brooks, with additional programming by Alex Darby and Mal Lansell. Steve and Jon Green and David Bland served as the game's artists, with Roger Barnett being the game's animator and illustrator. The audio was created by Matt Furniss.

The PlayStation version of Woody Woodpecker Racing was showcased at E3 2000. Initially projected for an October release, the game was released in North America for the PlayStation on November 15, 2000, and for Microsoft Windows on November 26. A Dreamcast version was originally scheduled to release on April 3, 2001, but was not released. In 2023, the Dreamcast source files were compiled into a playable format.

== Reception ==
Reception

Aggregate score
Aggregator	Score	
Aggregator	PC	PS
Metacritic	46/100	46/100

Review scores
Publication	Score	
Publication	PC	PS
AllGame	3/5	2.5/5
Computer and Video Games	N/A	1/5
Electronic Gaming Monthly	N/A	5/10
Game Informer	N/A	3/10
GameSpot	3.6/10	N/A
GameZone	8.5/10	8/10
IGN	4.5/10	4/10
Jeuxvideo.com	11/20	11/20
PlayStation Official Magazine – Australia	N/A	3/10
Official U.S. PlayStation Magazine	N/A	2/5
PC Zone	27/100	N/A

The PlayStation and PC versions of Woody Woodpecker Racing received "generally unfavorable" reviews according to aggregator Metacritic. Giancarlo Varanini of GameSpot gave the PC version a 3.6 of 10. Matt Helgeson of Game Informer, in a short blurb, dismissed the game as a cheap and unoriginal Crash Team Racing clone.

== Bibliography ==
- Woody Woodpecker Racing Instruction Booklet. Konami of America. 2000.
