= The Scorpion King: Sword of Osiris =

2002 video game

- Developer: WayForward Technologies
- Publisher: Universal Interactive
- Director: Matt Bozon
- Producers: Voldi Way; John Beck; Shereef Morse
- Designers: Matt Bozon; Paul Danielski
- Programmer: Michael W. Stragey
- Artists: Cole Phillips; Robert Buchanan; Luke Brookshier
- Composer: Jake Kaufman
- Series: The Mummy
- Platform: Game Boy Advance
- Release: NA: April 2, 2002
- Genre: Platform game
- Mode: Single-player

The Scorpion King: Sword of Osiris is a platform game developed by WayForward Technologies and published by Universal Interactive for the Game Boy Advance in 2002. It is based on the film The Scorpion King, serving as a sequel to it.

== Plot ==
The Scorpion King: Sword of Osiris is set after the events of The Scorpion King. The wizard Menthu and the witch Isis kidnap the hero Mathayus' sorceress bride Cassandra to use her powers to awaken the Dunes of Natash and unleash a thousand-year desert storm upon Egypt. To destroy the evil pair, Mathayus needs to uncover the world's most powerful blade, the Sword of Osiris, as well as the Hero's Gauntlet. After killing Menthu, Mathayus faces Isis, who uses the Scorpion Stone which transforms her into a half-scorpion monster for the final battle. If the player failed to collect all six runes, Isis instead flees with the Scorpion Stone after Mathayus defeats Menthu.

An alternate scenario depicts Mathayus kidnapped by the villains and it is Cassandra who fights to free him.

== Reception ==
Reception

Aggregate score
Aggregator	Score
Metacritic	72/100

Review scores
Publication	Score
GameSpot	8/10
IGN	8/10

The Scorpion King: Sword of Osiris received mixed to positive review upon release. On Metacritic, the game received an average score of 72 out of 100, indicating "mixed or average reviews".

Its review scores included 8/10 from GameSpot, 82/100 from GameSpy, 9/10 from GameZone, and 8/10 from IGN.
