= Universal Interactive =

Defunct American video game publisher

Universal Interactive, Inc.
- Final logo, used from 2002 to 2004
- Formerly: Universal Interactive Studios, Inc. (1994–2001)
- Type: Division
- Industry: Video games
- Founded: January 4, 1994; 32 years ago
- Founders: Skip Paul; Robert Biniaz
- Defunct: 2004; 22 years ago
- Fate: Consolidated
- Successor: Vivendi Universal Games
- Headquarters: 100 Universal City Plaza, Universal City, California, U.S.
- Parent: MCA Inc. (1994–1996); Universal Studios, Inc. (1996–2000); Vivendi Universal Games (2000–2004)
- Website: universal-interactive.com (archived February 3, 2003)

Universal Interactive, Inc., formerly Universal Interactive Studios, Inc. until 2001, was an American video game publisher and a subsidiary of Vivendi Universal Games (now Vivendi Games). It was established on January 4, 1994, by Skip Paul and Robert Biniaz as a subsidiary of MCA Inc., later Universal Studios, Inc., and was based in Universal City, California. It was best known for producing and later publishing the Crash Bandicoot and Spyro platform game franchises. Other key releases include The Grinch (2000) and Hulk (2003).

In 2000, Universal Studios merged with Vivendi, resulting in the integration of Universal Interactive into Vivendi Universal Games. Universal Interactive continued as a label until 2004, when Vivendi began divesting ownership of Universal Studios, retaining the newly renamed Vivendi Games.

== History ==
=== Predecessors (1982–1993) ===
MCA, parent of Universal Pictures, initially licensed video games directly as merchandise. In 1982, MCA licensed its film E.T. the Extra-Terrestrial to Atari, securing a deal worth US$20–25 million after negotiations with Steven Spielberg and MCA president Sidney Sheinberg. The agreement, finalized in late July 1982, pressured Atari to rush development under programmer Howard Scott Warshaw, who had just five weeks to create the Atari 2600 title ahead of the Christmas release tied to the film's success. The resulting game was one of the biggest commercial failures in video game history, with Atari burying millions of unsold cartridges in a New Mexico landfill in 1983.

In 1985, MCA acquired toy manufacturer LJN for about US$67.5 million, initially purchasing 63% in a stock exchange valued at US$39.8 million before completing the deal. Under MCA's ownership, LJN expanded into video game publishing in 1987, with notable releases including Friday the 13th (1989) and Back to the Future (1989). By 1990, amid financial losses at LJN, MCA announced the sale of the unit to Acclaim Entertainment for an undisclosed sum involving cash and stock, taking a US$30 million charge against earnings; this occurred shortly before Matsushita Electric (now Panasonic) acquired MCA itself in November 1990 for US$6.13 billion. In early 1993, Matsushita partnered with The 3DO Company, with MCA/Universal committing as an equity investor and software provider for the 3DO platform, unveiled at the Consumer Electronics Show to explore multimedia entertainment.

=== Universal Interactive Studios (1994–1999) ===
Universal Interactive Studios was founded on January 4, 1994 as a subsidiary of MCA, with Charles "Skip" Paul serving as executive vice president and head of the new division, and Robert Biniaz appointed as chief operating officer. On February 10, MCA acquired a minority stake in Interplay Productions, which would publish Disruptor outside of North America, and later enter into a distribution deal with successor Vivendi Universal Games.

The company's first titles in mid-1994 were Jurassic Park Interactive, developed by Studio 3DO and initially announced in 1993; and Way of the Warrior, developed by Naughty Dog.

Universal contracted with Naughty Dog and Insomniac Games to develop games utilizing the facilities at Universal City, under vice president Mark Cerny. They respectively released Crash Bandicoot in 1996 and Spyro the Dragon in 1998, under publishing arrangements with Sony Computer Entertainment.

Starting in 1995, with the purchase of MCA by Canadian beverage company Seagram, Universal Studios was reorganized. By 1998, the Interactive Studios division was brought under the Universal Studios New Media Group, led by Paul Rioux. That year, Cerny resigned to launch Cerny Games, which continued to consult directly with Insomniac and Naughty Dog.

An in-house development unit, Universal Studios Digital Arts, was created to develop Xena: Warrior Princess.

By the end of 1999, UIS transitioned solely from the PlayStation to include PC and Dreamcast development as well, as well as planned support for next-generation systems.

In July 2000, UIS announced one of their first PlayStation 2 projects, a tie-in to the then-upcoming The Mummy Returns, which would release near the time of the movie.

==== Partnership with Konami ====
On December 16, 1999, Universal Interactive Studios and Konami announced a global strategic alliance. The deal would allow Konami to distribute and market titles from UIS that were based on existing Universal Studios properties, with franchises part of the deal including The Mummy, Universal Studios Monsters, Dr. Seuss' How the Grinch Stole Christmas and Woody Woodpecker.

In January 2000, UIS and Konami officially announced that the first title under their new partnership would be the Dreamcast title Nightmare Creatures 2.

The deal expanded further on April 27, allowing Konami to publish and market more titles.

The four PlayStation titles released as part of this partnership were announced at E3 2000 by Konami: Woody Woodpecker Racing, The Grinch, The Mummy and Monster Force.

In September, the deal was expanded further to include three brand new next-gen titles: The Thing, a sequel to the 1982 movie of the same name for the Xbox, as well as separate titles for the Game Boy Color and Game Boy Advance, a tie-in game to the then-upcoming Jurassic Park 3, and an upcoming Crash Bandicoot title.

=== Vivendi merger (2000–2002) ===
In July 2000, Seagram merged Universal Studios with Vivendi. After the merger closed, UIS was transitioned to Vivendi's Havas Interactive division and was eventually downgraded to a publishing label of the now-named Vivendi Universal Interactive Publishing.

At UIS' first E3 under their new owners in 2001, the company signed an exclusive worldwide partnership with Microsoft to publish titles based on Bruce Lee exclusively for the Xbox, with the first being Bruce Lee: Quest of the Dragon. No release window was announced for the title. Other announced titles at the event included the first Spyro title for a non-PlayStation system: Spyro: Season of Ice for the Game Boy Advance. Previously announced titles The Mummy Returns and Crash Bandicoot: The Wrath of Cortex were also showcased.

On August 13, UIS announced the first Crash Bandicoot title for a non-PlayStation system: Crash Bandicoot XS for the Game Boy Advance (later renamed to Crash Bandicoot: The Huge Adventure for North America), and would be released for an early 2002 release window.

Near the end of the year, Universal Interactive Studios' name was shortened to simply Universal Interactive.

On January 17, the company announced to publish two titles based on The Scorpion King: Rise of the Akkadian for the GameCube and Sword of Osiris for the Game Boy Advance. Also on January 17, Universal Interactive announced a deal with Marvel to publish video games based on The Incredible Hulk. On January 31, an Xbox version of Crash Bandicoot: The Wrath of Cortex was announced by the company for a Q1 2002 release window.

During Vivendi Universal Games' first Game Faire on February 19, 2002, Universal Interactive showcased twelve titles: which featured previously announced titles Bruce Lee: Quest of the Dragon (which was announced to be released within the third quarter of 2002), The Scorpion King: Sword of Osiris, The Thing, and both The Scorpion King titles (with a PS2 version announced) and newly announced titles such as Jurassic Park: Project Genesis for a Q4 2002 window on the PlayStation 2, Xbox and PC, Spyro: Season of Flame for Game Boy Advance for Q3 2002, and Spyro: Enter the Dragonfly for the PlayStation 2 for a Q4 2002 release, and Monster Force for Game Boy Advance for Q3 2002. The already-announced Lord of the Rings titles for the Xbox and Game Boy Advance were also transferred over from VU's Sierra Entertainment subsidiary to Universal.

Before E3 2002 on May 7, Universal Interactive announced a GameCube port of Crash Bandicoot: The Wrath of Cortex for a Q3 2002 release.

On June 11, Universal Interactive announced plans to publish titles based on The Hulk, with one for consoles and PCs, and another for the Game Boy Advance. On July 9, the company's GameCube portfolio expanded with the announcements of a GCN port of Spyro: Enter the Dragonfly, and the acquisition of 4x4 Evo 2 within an unknown time frame. In August 2002, Vivendi Universal Games announced that The Thing and The Lord of the Rings: The Fellowship of the Ring were transferred over from Universal Interactive to the newly formed Black Label Games label, which would be aimed for more mature titles.

Near the summer, another Game Boy Advance Crash Bandicoot title was announced: Crash Bandicoot 2: N-Tranced.

=== Under Vivendi Universal Games (2003–2006) ===
On January 28, a Bruce Lee title for the Game Boy Advance titled Bruce Lee: Return of the Legend was announced.

On April 24, Universal Interactive's parent company announced their plans for E3 2003, and announced several new titles to be released under the Universal Interactive label: Spyro: Attack of the Rhynocs for the Game Boy Advance, Battlestar Galactica for the PlayStation 2 and Xbox, Crash Nitro Kart for consoles and Game Boy Advance, and The Fast and the Furious for the PlayStation 2 and Xbox which ultimately never released.

By 2004, the Universal Interactive brand was effectively phased out, with publishing consolidated directly under Vivendi Universal Games, though the copyright persisted on select titles. Intellectual property management for flagship franchises like Crash Bandicoot and Spyro shifted to Sierra Entertainment, a Vivendi subsidiary. On March 3, 2006, Vivendi Universal announced that, as a result of divesting Universal Studios to General Electric, it and several of its divisions, including Vivendi Universal Games, would cease using the "Universal" name and would simply become Vivendi, with Vivendi Universal Games becoming Vivendi Games.

== Games ==
Year	Title	Platforms	Developers
1994	Jurassic Park Interactive	3DO Interactive Multiplayer	Studio 3DO
1994	Way of the Warrior	3DO Interactive Multiplayer	Naughty Dog
1996	Crash Bandicoot	PlayStation	Naughty Dog
1996	Disruptor	PlayStation	Insomniac Games
1997	Crash Bandicoot 2: Cortex Strikes Back	PlayStation	Naughty Dog
1998	Spyro the Dragon	PlayStation	Insomniac Games
1998	Running Wild	PlayStation	Blue Shift
1998	Crash Bandicoot: Warped	PlayStation	Naughty Dog
1999	Xena: Warrior Princess	PlayStation	Universal Studios Digital Arts
1999	Spyro 2: Ripto's Rage!	PlayStation	Insomniac Games
1999	Crash Team Racing	PlayStation	Naughty Dog
2000	Spyro: Year of the Dragon	PlayStation	Insomniac Games
2000	Crash Bash	PlayStation	Eurocom Entertainment Software
2000	The Grinch	PlayStation, Dreamcast, Game Boy Color, Windows	Artificial Mind and Movement
2000	Woody Woodpecker Racing	PlayStation, Windows	Syrox Developments
2000	The Mummy	PlayStation, Windows, Game Boy Color	Rebellion Developments
2000	Woody Woodpecker Racing	Game Boy Color	Konami
2001	The Mummy Returns	PlayStation 2, Game Boy Color	Blitz Games; Game Brains
2001	Spyro: Season of Ice	Game Boy Advance	Digital Eclipse
2001	Crash Bandicoot: The Wrath of Cortex	PlayStation 2, GameCube, Xbox	Traveller's Tales; Eurocom Entertainment Software
2002	Crash Bandicoot: The Huge Adventure	Game Boy Advance	Vicarious Visions
2002	The Scorpion King: Sword of Osiris	Game Boy Advance	WayForward Technologies
2002	Bruce Lee: Quest of the Dragon	Xbox	Ronin Entertainment
2002	4x4 EVO 2	GameCube	Terminal Reality
2002	The Scorpion King: Rise of the Akkadian	GameCube, PlayStation 2	Point of View, Inc.
2002	Spyro 2: Season of Flame	Game Boy Advance	Digital Eclipse
2002	Monster Force	Game Boy Advance	Digital Eclipse
2002	Spyro: Enter the Dragonfly	GameCube, PlayStation 2	Check Six Games, Equinoxe Digital Entertainment
2003	Crash Bandicoot 2: N-Tranced	Game Boy Advance	Vicarious Visions
2003	Bruce Lee: Return of the Legend	Game Boy Advance	Vicarious Visions
2003	Jurassic Park: Operation Genesis	Windows, PlayStation 2, Xbox	Blue Tongue Entertainment
2003	Hulk	GameCube, Windows, PlayStation 2, Xbox	Radical Entertainment
2003	The Incredible Hulk	Game Boy Advance	Pocket Studios
2003	Spyro: Attack of the Rhynocs	Game Boy Advance	Digital Eclipse
2003	Crash Nitro Kart	PlayStation 2, Xbox, GameCube, Game Boy Advance, N-Gage	Vicarious Visions
2003	Battlestar Galactica	PlayStation 2, Xbox	Warthog Games
