= The Scorpion King: Rise of the Akkadian =

2002 video game

- Developers: Point of View, Inc.
- Publisher: Universal Interactive
- Producer: Jon Sieker
- Designer: Edward Linley
- Programmer: Rich Rempel
- Artist: Ivan Enriquez
- Composer: Rik Schaffer
- Platforms: PlayStation 2, GameCube
- Release: PlayStation 2: NA: September 10, 2002; EU: November 29, 2002; GameCube: NA: September 10, 2002; EU: December 5, 2002
- Genre: Action-adventure
- Mode: Single-player

The Scorpion King: Rise of the Akkadian is an action-adventure game developed by Point of View, Inc. and published by Universal Interactive for the GameCube and PlayStation 2 in 2002. It serves as a prequel to the film The Scorpion King, and features Dwayne Johnson reprising his role of Mathayus.

== Plot ==
The game opens with Mathayus, his half-brother, Jesup and their friend Rama, training in the art of combat. After completing his training with his half-brother, the Akkadian king Urhmet sends Mathayus to assassinate the Lord of Khemet, who has murdered one of his loyal concubines.

Upon arriving in the warlord's chambers, he finds the warlord dead and eaten. Anubis himself appears before him and Mathayus fights him. Temporarily defeating Anubis, Magus reveals himself - he set Mathayus up so that he would run into Magus on purpose. He wants to employ Mathayus' services for his own ends and when Mathayus refuses, Magus imprisons him in his underground prison.

Mathayus meets Hammet, an old man who was also trapped there for refusing to help Magus. Mathayus and Hammet escape the underground prison and make their way back to the Akkadian village where Mathayus trained with his brothers. Magus had attacked the village and after fighting his troops off, Mathayus finds Rama gravely injured and vows to find Magus. He is attacked by Horus and is forced to kill them before he can leave.

He makes for the Isle of Crete, but is shipwrecked along the way. He finds out about a Minotaur threatening the Isle and causing trouble for the inhabitants. Mathayus says he will fight the Minotaur himself and kills all resistance on his way, and kills the Minotaur in the end.

After defeating the Minotaur, Mathayus finds himself in the land of the Sphinx. After killing the Sphinx and entering the Netherworld he hears the voice of Ptar telling him of the Sword of Osiris. Mathayus gathers the pieces of the broken blade and takes them to Ptar's chambers, where Ptar fixes the Sword of Osiris and gives it to Mathayus, warning him to never let it fall into the wrong hands. On his way back into the land of the living he is stopped by Apep, who tells him he must die because no living man is allowed in the Netherworld. Mathayus defeats Apep and leaves.

After leaving the Netherworld, Mathayus finds himself in Magus' gardens, and after making his way through and killing all opposition he arrives at the Tower of Babel, where Magus is said to reside. He scales the tower and finds Hammet at the top, who tells him that Magus still had troops in the mountains near his village, and kidnapped Jesup and Rama shortly after he left them. Mathayus cuts Hammet down with the Sword of Osiris, freeing him, but Hammet then attacks Mathayus and knocks him down. He reveals himself to be Magus in disguise, allowing him to surprise Mathayus and imprison him as well. He takes the Sword of Osiris and prepares to summon Set, the lord of Chaos and claim dominion over the world. He says he used Mathayus to enter the Netherworld and retrieve the Sword for him. Mathayus fights and defeats Magus, but Magus laughs at him, saying that in order to become Set, he needed to be defeated by his enemy. Thus, he transforms into Set and attempts to kill Mathayus and rule the world. Mathayus ultimately kills him with the Sword of Osiris and sets Jesup and Rama free. The three brothers walk out and leave the tower as it explodes and releases a beacon of energy into the sky.

== Reception ==
Reception

Aggregate scores
Aggregator	Score	
Aggregator	GameCube	PS2
GameRankings	46.70%	50.87%
Metacritic	49/100	47/100

Review scores
Publication	Score	
Publication	GameCube	PS2
Game Informer	3/10	N/A
GamePro	N/A	2.5/5
GameSpot	4.2/10	4/10
GameZone	7/10	5.6/10
IGN	5.7/10	6.2/10
NGC Magazine	30%	N/A
Nintendo Power	2.8/5	N/A
Nintendo World Report	3/10	N/A
Official U.S. PlayStation Magazine	N/A	2/5
X-Play	N/A	2/5
Entertainment Weekly	D	D

The Scorpion King: Rise of the Akkadian received "mixed or average" reviews, according to review aggregator Metacritic.

In his review of the GameCube version for GameSpot, Brad Shoemaker said the game was similar to the film, in that it had a "very thin plot" and was not "very interesting or entertaining". He found the combat "flimsy and frustrating" and found the graphics at best "serviceable", if a "little bland". Jeremy Dunham writing for IGN, complemented "the inclusion of an RPG-like experience structure", as well as the collect-a-thon style gameplay, but was critical to its "basic" combat system and said that the game was likely a "tragic victim of the hurried movie license".
