= Terrence Masson =

American film producer

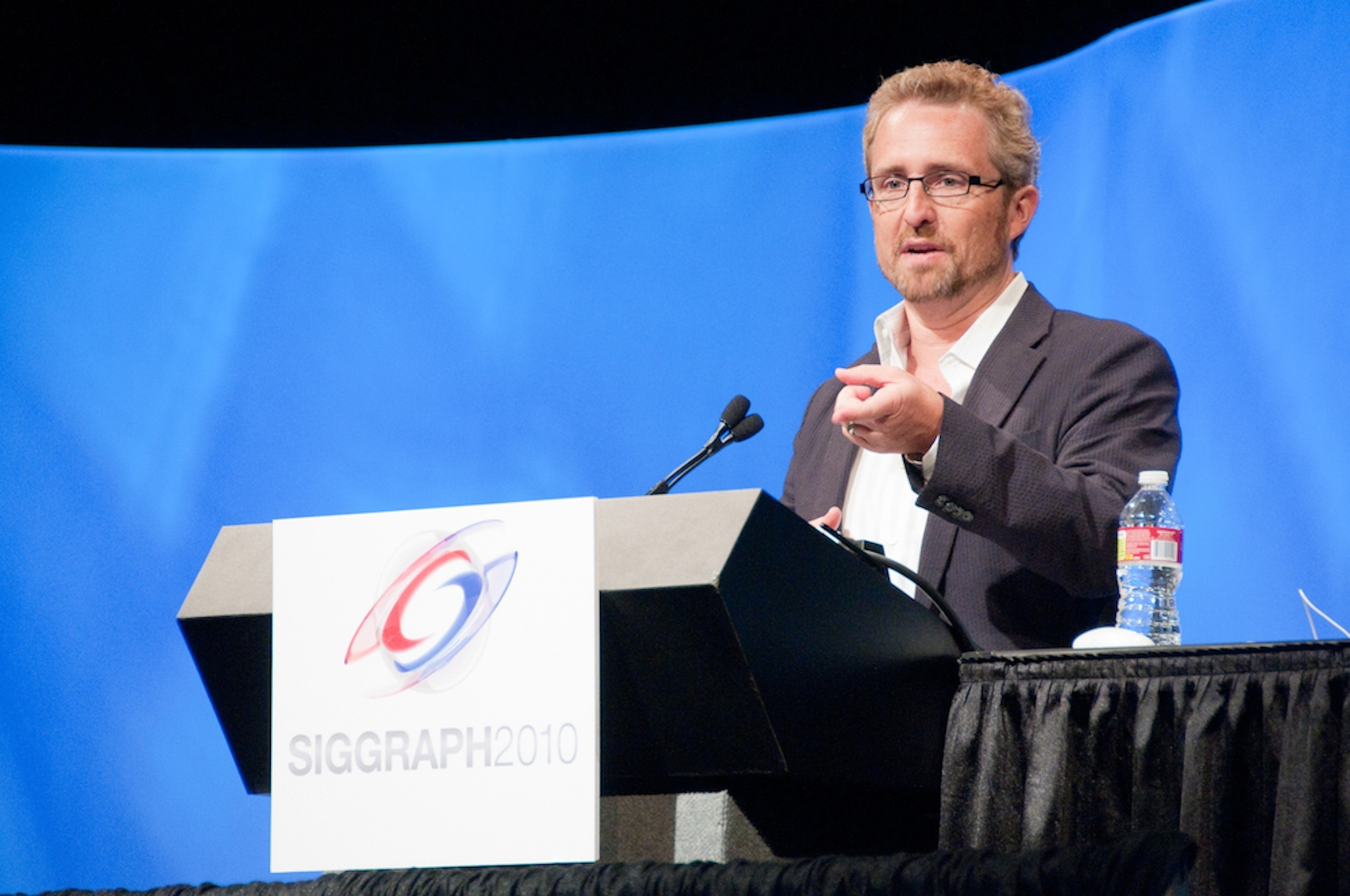
- Terrence Masson opening address as Conference Chair of ACM SIGGRAPH 2010 in Los Angeles, CA
- Born: September 20, 1966 (age 59)
- Education: MFA
- Alma mater: University of Massachusetts Lowell, William Paterson University
- Occupations: Interactive media visionary, producer & educator, Founder and CEO of Building Conversation
- Years active: 1985 to present

Terrence Masson is a computer graphics educator, producer, and lecturer, specializing in animation, storytelling and executive leadership. He was the chair of the MFA Computer Arts Department from 2016 to 2026, and the founding Director of the SVA Graduate Center at the School of Visual Arts (SVA) in New York City. He was also founder and CEO of Building Conversation, an augmented reality company located in Boston, MA. He was both the ACM SIGGRAPH 2006 Computer Animation Festival Chair and 2010 Conference Chair. He also wrote the book CG 101: A Computer Graphics Industry Reference, and has contributed to films, television programs, and video games.

== Education ==
Masson graduated from the University of Massachusetts Lowell in 1989 with a BFA in Graphic Design and a minor in Art History, followed by William Paterson University in 1990 with an MFA in Computer Animation.

== Career ==
Masson was the Founder and CEO of Building Conversation, an augmented reality company serving the architectural engineering & construction (AEC) and real estate industries. He came up through the ranks with credits in approximately 20 feature films, including three Star Wars movies, Hook, True Lies and Interview with the Vampire. Masson began his own consulting company "Digital Fauxtography" in 1994, working as a Creative Producer, Director, and VFX Supervisor. He also single-handedly developed the original computer animation technique for South Park in 1996.

Masson's interactive projects have included Siberia 2, Sim City 4, Batman: Dark Tomorrow, and Alter Echo and the Xbox launch title Bruce Lee: Quest of the Dragon. As an award-winning Director and Producer his short animated film Bunkie & Booboo won first place in the World Animation Celebration in 1998. from Animation World Network. As Creative Producer, he consults with major production studios worldwide on creative development and pipeline efficiency. Masson has also served as an on-camera image analysis expert for the History Channel's Ancient Aliens and UFO Hunters.

As Founding Director of Creative Industries at Northeastern University in Boston (2008-2013), Masson oversaw seven combined majors in Game Design and Interactive Media as well as the Creative Industries minors. He is a longtime member of the Producers Guild of America, the Visual Effects Society and has been active in SIGGRAPH since 1988, as Outstanding Service Award Chair, 2006 Computer Animation Festival Chair and SIGGRAPH 2010 Conference Chair.

Masson is a Master of Animation and Film Special Effects with the Beijing DeTao Masters Academy (DTMA), a high-level, multi-disciplined, application-oriented higher education institution in Shanghai, China.

== Works ==
=== Films ===
- Hook (1991)
- Color of Night (1993)
- Interview with the Vampire (1993)
- True Lies (1993)
- Under Siege 2: Dark Territory (1994)
- Judge Dredd (1994)
- Woodstock: 25th Anniversary (1994)
- Batman Forever (1995)
- Cutthroat Island (1996)
- Anaconda (1996)
- The Lord Protector: The Riddle of the Chosen (1996)
- The Empire Strikes Back (Special Edition) (1996)
- Return of the Jedi (Special Edition) (1997)
- Spawn (1998)
- Small Soldiers (1998)
- Star Wars: Episode I – The Phantom Menace (1999)
- Fantastic Four (2004)

=== Videogames ===
- Cyberia 2: Resurrection (1994), Virgin Interactive
- Bruce Lee: Quest of the Dragon (2002), Universal Interactive
- Sim City 4 (2002), Maxis
- Alter Echo (2003), THQ
- Batman: Dark Tomorrow (2003), Kemco
- Midnight Club II (2003), Rockstar Games

=== Television ===
- UFO Hunters, (2008–2009), History Channel
- Ancient Aliens, (2012), History Channel

=== Books ===
- CG101: A Computer Graphics Industry Reference (1st ed.). New Riders Press. 1999. ISBN 978-0735700468.
- CG101: A Computer Graphics Industry Reference (2nd ed.). Digital Fauxtography. 2007. ISBN 978-0977871001.

=== Special venues ===
- Luxor (ride film) (1993), Trumbull Co.
- Mars Odyssey (ride film) (1995), Simex Digital Studios
