= Monster Force (video game) =

2002 video game

- North American cover art
- Developer: Digital Eclipse
- Publisher: Universal Interactive
- Director: Michael Mika Sr.
- Producer: Renée Johnson
- Programmer: Dedan Anderson
- Artist: Ray Cosico
- Platform: Game Boy Advance
- Release: NA: August 22, 2002; EU: October 4, 2002
- Genre: Action
- Modes: Single-player, multiplayer

Monster Force is an action video game developed by Digital Eclipse and published by Universal Interactive exclusively for Game Boy Advance. A planned PlayStation version of the game was to be released in 2001 by Konami, as well as a Game Boy Color version, but these never achieved fruition. In the game, players control stylized versions of classic Universal movie monsters, as they attempt to thwart the plans of their creator's evil brother.

== Plot ==
Scientist Dr. Victor Frankenstein and his younger brother Dr. Percy Frankenstein have been chased out of their hometown by an angry mob after their creations Frank, Drac, and Wolfie scared them. This results in the scientists and their creations living in a place called Monsterland. One night, the three monsters decide to hang out as Victor Frankenstein works on a creation that he hopes will enable him to return to his home and regain the villagers' trust. He however mysteriously disappears before he finishes it. The monsters find their creator missing and go on to search for him. On their quest, they meet two new monsters named Mina and Drew. The two have been depowered and stay at Victor Frankenstein's lab. Eventually, they find out that Percy Frankenstein was behind the disappearance of his brother Victor the whole time. He then unleashes his creation Sergeant Smash to destroy the monsters. After defeating Sergeant Smash, Percy is squashed flat by his own creation and Victor is saved. He then gives Mina and Drew their powers back and the two live with Victor, Frank, Drac, and Wolfie.

== Gameplay ==
The gameplay is similar to the game Gauntlet. Gameplay is depicted from a top-down perspective, where players control one of three monsters, including Frank, Drac, and Wolfie, in addition to the unlockable characters Mina and Drew. Players can fire projectiles at enemies, and can also collect atoms to purchase power-ups and healing items between levels. Every level consists of two levels set in a specific setting usually appropriate with horror films (e.g., a cemetery, a laboratory). After completing those levels, the player must complete a trial level, where they must achieve a certain objective. Failure to complete the trial levels results in having to fight a boss. If hooked up to another Game Boy Advance, two players can fight each other.

== Reception ==
Reception

Aggregate score
Aggregator	Score
Metacritic	65/100

Review scores
Publication	Score
GamePro	3/5
GameSpy	3/5
GameZone	6.9/10
IGN	6.5/10
Nintendo Power	3.4/5

The game received "mixed" reviews according to the review aggregation website Metacritic. Nintendo Power gave the game an average review, over three months before its U.S. release date.
