= Battlestar Galactica (2003 video game) =

- North American PlayStation 2 cover art
- Developer: Warthog Games
- Publisher: Universal Interactive
- Series: Battlestar Galactica
- Platforms: Xbox, PlayStation 2
- Release: NA: November 18, 2003; EU: December 5, 2003 (Xbox); EU: December 12, 2003 (PS2)
- Genre: Space combat simulator
- Mode: Single-player

Battlestar Galactica is a science fiction video game developed by Warthog Games and published by Universal Interactive for Xbox and PlayStation 2. Although released in 2003, coinciding with the reimagined miniseries, the game itself is based on the original show from 1978.

== Gameplay ==
During the combat, the performance of all missiles can be adjusted at any time, where the players can balance between speed and power, or blast radius and turning radius. The game judges the player's performance through categories at the end of each mission, and accordingly gives medals for that. Every mission can be replayed for more gold and extras, ranging from various art to certain codes that change the game.

== Plot ==
The game follows the younger Adama's career during the First Cylon War, as he battles against the Cylon ships.

== Reception ==
Reception

Aggregate score
Aggregator	Score	
Aggregator	PS2	Xbox
Metacritic	66/100	63/100

Review scores
Publication	Score	
Publication	PS2	Xbox
GamePro	4/5	4/5
GameRevolution	C	C
GameSpot	7.1/10	7.1/10
GameZone	8/10	7/10
IGN	7.4/10	7.4/10
Jeuxvideo.com	10/20	10/20
Official U.S. PlayStation Magazine	5/10	N/A
Official Xbox Magazine (US)	N/A	7/10
TeamXbox	N/A	6.7/10
