= The Incredible Hulk (2003 video game) =

- North American box art
- Developer: Pocket Studios
- Publisher: Universal Interactive
- Director: David Williams
- Producers: Jonathan Eubanks; Jeff Barnhart; Steve Iles
- Designer: Mark Shaw
- Programmers: Darren Clayton; Gabriel Lee
- Artists: Mark Wortham; Simon Sheridan; Tony Hager
- Composer: Steve Collett
- Platform: Game Boy Advance
- Release: NA: May 28, 2003; EU: June 2003
- Genre: Beat 'em up
- Modes: Single-player, multiplayer

The Incredible Hulk is a 2003 beat 'em up video game developed by Pocket Studios and published by Universal Interactive for the Game Boy Advance. The game, featuring an isometric perspective, is based on the Marvel Comics superhero Hulk, who must traverse through a series of levels and destroy enemies with an assortment of physical attacks; a multiplayer mode in which players battle against each other is also featured.

The game was released simultaneously alongside the console and Microsoft Windows title Hulk to coincide with the release of the film, but differs from its counterpart in its basis on the comics rather than the film. Critical reception to the game was mixed; while the visuals were commended, the gameplay, controls, and audio were criticized, and reactions to the multiplayer mode were divided.

== Gameplay ==
An example of gameplay in The Incredible Hulk.

The Incredible Hulk is a free-roaming isometric beat 'em up game in which the player controls the Hulk and guides him through a series of 33 levels. The Hulk can move in eight directions, and his default movement can be toggled between diagonal and horizontal in the options menu. The Hulk can also jump, pick up and throw objects, and use an assortment of physical attacks to destroy enemies and cause damage to the environment. Some levels require the Hulk to locate and destroy generators to deactivate environmental hazards that block a path through the level, and many areas contain hidden paths that can be uncovered by breaking cracked walls.

Inflicting and sustaining damage increases a "rage gauge" located at the bottom-left corner of the screen, which allows the Hulk to execute a trio of powerful special attacks that slightly reduce the gauge. The Hulk's health is represented by his image above the rage gauge and regenerates automatically. If the Hulk's health is fully depleted, the game ends prematurely. Items that can restore the Hulk's health and rage can be collected from destructible objects such as vending machines and buildings.

Via the Game Boy Advance Game Link Cable, two to four players can engage in a multiplayer mode named "Hulkmatch", in which differently-colored Hulks fight by throwing large objects at each other and must either reach a predetermined number of kills or be the last player standing.

== Plot ==
During a gamma bomb test firing in a remote desert, mild-mannered scientist Bruce Banner rescues bystander Rick Jones and takes the brunt of the bomb's gamma rays. While detained in an underground facility, Banner transforms into a powerful and savage beast known as the Hulk, whom Banner holds a subconscious influence over. The Hulk breaks out of the facility, and General Thunderbolt Ross holds him responsible for the disappearance of Banner and Rick. The Hulk fends off the pursuing military forces and protects Banner's secret lab from a group of humanoid mutants led by the Leader, an evil genius whose intellect also originates from gamma radiation. Upon discovering that the subterranean dictator Tyrannus is holding Ross's daughter Betty hostage in a bid to conquer the United States, the Hulk breaks into Tyrannus's palace and rescues Betty.

The Hulk bounds through a city, where Ross pits him against Banner's prototype armored robot. Ross, suspecting a link between Banner and the Hulk, has Banner arrested and detained and uses Rick to bait the Hulk's re-emergence, unaware that Banner and the Hulk are one and the same. As the Hulk rescues Rick, the Leader takes advantage of the chaos by having his humanoids infiltrate the compound to steal a gamma-absorbing device known as the Absorbatron, but the Hulk thwarts this attempt. The military uses Banner's giant T-Gun against the Hulk, who is teleported to a futuristic city ruled by the Executioner. In the Hulk's absence, the Leader initiates another attempt to steal the Absorbatron. However, the effects of the T-Gun expire after the Executioner's defeat, teleporting the Hulk back to the present day and allowing him to defeat the Leader's Super-Humanoid.

The Hulk is then teleported to an underground arena where he fights Tyrannus's Octosapien robot, and he returns to the surface to fight the Executioner, who has followed him to the present day. The Hulk once more fends off the military while returning to Banner's secret lab, which has been infiltrated by Emil Blonsky, one of the Leader's spies. Blonsky uses Banner's technology to transform himself into the Abomination, but is defeated by the Hulk. Rick reveals the Hulk's nature to Ross, and the military allows the Hulk to escape Banner's cave.

== Development and release ==
Universal Interactive signed a deal with Marvel Enterprises for the video game rights of the Marvel Comics character Hulk in January 2002, and on June 11 revealed the development of two video games based on the property; one would be a console title based on the upcoming Hulk film, while the other would be a Game Boy Advance title based on the comics. The two games would see a simultaneous release coinciding with that of the film on June 20, 2003. The Incredible Hulk was developed by Pocket Studios under the direction of David Williams, and with Jonathan Eubanks, Jeff Barnhart, and Steve Iles serving as producers. The game was designed by Mark Shaw and programmed by Darren Clayton and Gabriel Lee. The art team consisted of Mark Wortham, Simon Sheridan, and Tony Hager, and the animation was created by Wortham, Andy Jones, and Chris Perrigo. The levels were designed by Shaw, Wortham, Williams, and Tom Heaton. The music was composed by Steve Collett, who previously arranged the music for the SNES version of the 1994 game. Nintendo constructed a special template for the game's retail box, which features a flap on the cover that can be opened to reveal an original four-panel comic strip that explains the Hulk's origins. The Incredible Hulk was shipped and released on May 28, 2003. In its first full month of release, it was the 20th best-selling video game in the United States.

== Reception ==
Reception

Aggregate score
Aggregator	Score
Metacritic	57/100

Review scores
Publication	Score
AllGame	2/5
Electronic Gaming Monthly	14/30
Game Informer	4/10
GameSpot	7.7/10
GameSpy	62%
GameZone	6.5/10
IGN	6/10
Jeuxvideo.com	9/20
X-Play	2/5

The Incredible Hulk received "mixed or average" reviews according to aggregator Metacritic. Critics deemed the gameplay to be shallow and repetitive. The amount and length of the levels was noted to be unusual for a licensed game, though some considered it a detriment, with Craig Harris of IGN suggesting that an overworld map would have been helpful in displaying how much ground has been covered. The controls and collision detection were criticized as awkward, and the isometric perspective was blamed for exacerbating the issue. Greg Ford of Electronic Gaming Monthly and Byrn Williams of GameSpy faulted the enemies' artificial intelligence, with Williams pointing out that "quite often they'll just stand there waiting for Hulk to take them to the cleaners". Scott Alan Marriott of AllGame questioned the lack of incentives that he felt would have enhanced the replay value by encouraging the player to destroy more enemies or complete a level within a certain time. Reception to the multiplayer mode was divided; while some considered it fun and beneficial to replay value, others dismissed it for its lack of attacks and gameplay that encourages avoiding opponents.

Assessments of the visuals were generally positive. The character rendering and animation was widely regarded as well-done, though Eduardo Zacarias of GameZone remarked that the Hulk's sprite was small, and Marriott deemed the animation sluggish and the enemies repetitive. Frank Provo of GameSpot and Electronic Gaming Monthly's John Ricciardi and Jon Dudlak considered the isometric perspective interesting, with Ricciardi and Dudlak comparing the visuals to Diablo. The environments were said to be sparsely detailed, with Provo elaborating that "you won't see multiple layers of the background moving independently of one another—rivers don't flow, and torches don't burn". Zacarias and Harris commended the graphics engine's ability to generate large groups of enemies and destructible elements. The comic book-styled cutscenes were admired, though Chris Hudak of X-Play remarked that the script was "painfully hokey". The reviewers of Electronic Gaming Monthly further derided the story as "terrible". The audio was criticized for its repetitiveness, with Williams describing the soundtrack as a "mind-numbing dirge", though Zacarias commended the variety of sound effects.
