= Crash Bandicoot: The Huge Adventure =

2002 video game

- North American box art
- Developer: Vicarious Visions
- Publisher: Universal Interactive
- Directors: Karthik Bala; Jesse Booth; Mike Meischeid
- Producers: Karthik Bala; Tobi Saulnier; Daniel Suarez
- Designers: Luis Barriga; Karthik Bala
- Programmers: Nate Trost; Robert Trevellyan; Alex Rybakov; Jesse Raymond; Chris Pruett; Jesse Booth; Viktor Kuzmin
- Artists: Steve Derrick; Theodore Bialek; Christopher Winters; Mei He; Jason Harlow; Carl Schell; Jim Powell; Wes Merritt; Jorge Diaz; Florian Freisleder
- Composers: Manfred Linzner; Todd Masten
- Series: Crash Bandicoot
- Platform: Game Boy Advance
- Release: NA: Q1 2002; EU: March 15, 2002
- Genre: Platform
- Mode: Single-player

Crash Bandicoot: The Huge Adventure (released as Crash Bandicoot XS in Europe) is a 2002 platform game developed by Vicarious Visions and published by Universal Interactive for the Game Boy Advance. It is the seventh installment in the Crash Bandicoot video game series, the first Crash Bandicoot game not to be released on a PlayStation console, and the first Crash Bandicoot game to be released on a handheld console. The game's story centers on a plot to shrink the Earth by the main antagonist, Doctor Neo Cortex, through the use of a gigantic weapon named the "Planetary Minimizer". The protagonist of the story, Crash Bandicoot, must gather Crystals to power a device that will return the Earth to its proper size, defeating Cortex and his minions along the way.

The game stemmed from an agreement between Universal Interactive Studios and Konami that enabled them to respectively produce and publish a Crash Bandicoot game for next-generation handheld game systems, ending the franchise's exclusivity to Sony-produced consoles. Critical reactions to Crash Bandicoot: The Huge Adventure were generally positive; the game was praised for its graphics, overall design and transition to a handheld format, but critics noted the game's lack of innovation compared to earlier titles. A sequel, Crash Bandicoot 2: N-Tranced, was released in 2003.

== Gameplay ==
An example of gameplay in Crash Bandicoot: The Huge Adventure

Crash Bandicoot: The Huge Adventure is a platform game in which the player controls Crash Bandicoot, who must gather 20 Crystals and reverse the shrinkage of the Earth at the hands of Doctor Neo Cortex, the main antagonist of the story. Much of the game takes place in a series of hubs, from which Crash can teleport to various areas of the Earth. Initially, only the first of four hubs is available for play. Each hub features five levels and a boss level. The goal in each level is to find and obtain a hidden Crystal. After completing all five levels in a hub, the boss level must be completed, in which Crash must defeat the boss character guarding the area. By defeating the boss, a new hub will be accessible for play. When all 20 Crystals are collected and the Earth has been enlarged to its proper size, the game is won.

Besides Crystals, Gems and Colored Gems can be collected for extra accomplishment. Gems are rewarded to the player if all of the crates in a level are broken open or if a secret area is completed. Colored Gems are found in special levels and lead to hidden areas. "Relics" can be won by re-entering a level where the Crystal has already been retrieved. To obtain a Relic, the player must initiate the "Time Trial" mode and race through a level in the pre-designated time displayed before entering a level. To begin a Time Trial run, the player must enter a level and activate the floating stopwatch near the beginning of the level to activate the timer; if the stopwatch is not touched, the level is played regularly. The player must then race through the level as quickly as possible. Scattered throughout the level are yellow crates with the numbers 1, 2 or 3 on them. When these crates are broken, the timer is frozen for the number of seconds designated by the box. Sapphire, Gold and Platinum Relics can be won depending on the player's final time.

At the beginning of the game, Crash has the ability to jump to navigate ledges, spin in a tornado-like fashion to break open crates and defeat enemies, deliver a body slam to break open tough objects and can either slide across the ground or crouch and crawl to get past low areas. Crash can expand on these abilities by defeating boss characters, often resulting in more powerful attacks or increased jumping and running prowess. Crash starts the game with six lives. Crash loses a life when he is struck by an enemy attack or suffers any other type of damage. More lives can be earned by instructing Crash to collect 100 "Wumpa Fruits" or break open a special crate to collect a life. Crash can be shielded from enemy attack by collecting an Aku Aku mask. Collecting three of these masks allows temporary invulnerability from all minor dangers.

== Plot ==
In a space station orbiting the Earth, Uka Uka is upset with Doctor Neo Cortex for failing him once again, but Cortex promises a plan that will bring the Earth's inhabitants down to size. Cortex then introduces his Planetary Minimizer, which he immediately uses to shrink the Earth down to the size of a grapefruit. The situation is brought to Aku Aku's attention when Cortex taunts the now-microscopic people of Earth. When Aku Aku informs Crash of the Earth's predicament, Coco assumes that Cortex is using the Crystals to power his shrinking machine, and requests that Crash find the same kind of Crystals in various locations around the world, which she will use to build a device that will reverse the effects of Cortex's Minimizer.

Cortex decides to deal with Crash himself by firing the Planetary Minimizer at him after Dingodile, N. Gin and Tiny are defeated. However, Crash tricks him into shrinking the colored Gems that stabilize the Minimizer, causing it to malfunction. The unrestrained effects of the Minimizer fuse Cortex and the previous bosses together, creating a monster known as Mega-Mix, who chases Crash down the space station's hallway in an attempt to kill him. Fortunately, Crash escapes back to the Earth just in time for Coco to use the Crystals that he has gathered to return the Earth back to normal again. The Earth is returned to its original size, while the space station above Earth explodes and Cortex and the others escape in an escape pod.

== Development and release ==
On September 21, 2000, Konami and Universal Studios announced that they had entered an agreement that would enable Konami to publish a Crash Bandicoot game for next-generation game systems, with Universal Interactive handling the production of the games. The Game Boy Color was originally included alongside the Game Boy Advance in the deal. The agreement served to break the Crash Bandicoot franchise's exclusivity to Sony-produced consoles and effectively made Crash Bandicoot a mascot character for Universal rather than Sony. That December, Vicarious Visions approached Universal and showed off some of their technology on the Game Boy Advance. Fairly impressed with their work, Universal asked Vicarious Visions to submit a concept. Liking the submitted concept, Universal commissioned a prototype; the prototype resembled a handheld version of the PlayStation Crash Bandicoot games. Vicarious Visions was then given developmental duties for the Game Boy Advance Crash Bandicoot game.

Development was directed by Karthik Bala, Jesse Booth, and Mike Meischeid, with Vicarious Visions' Bala and Tobi Saulnier and Universal's Daniel Suarez serving as producers. The game was primarily designed by Bala and Luis Barriga, with artists Theodore Bialek and Christopher Winters providing additional design. Other artists include Steve Derrick, Mei He, Jason Harlow, Carl Schell, Jim Powell, Wes Merritt, Jorge Diaz, and Florian Freisleder. Red Eye Studios assisted in creating the graphics and animation, which was created in Alias' Maya. Some of the original animation and textures from Crash Bandicoot: Warped were repurposed and used as a basis for the Game Boy Advance game. The sprite for the Crash Bandicoot character features between 1,000 and 1,500 frames of animation. At the height of development, there were as much as seven programmers working on the game, consisting of Booth, Nate Trost, Robert Trevellyan, Alex Rybakov, Jesse Raymond, Chris Pruett, and Viktor Kuzmin; the studio Cosmigo provided coding support. The audio for the game was created by Manfred Linzner of Shin'en Multimedia and Todd Masten, with additional sound effects provided by Universal Sound Studios. The game uses a static random access memory battery, allowing the player to save their progress. The game was designed with battery saving in mind from the beginning of production, as keeping track of all the data would prove extremely cumbersome with a password system.

The game was tentatively titled Crash Bandicoot Advance and went through the titles Crash Bandicoot X/S and Crash Bandicoot: The Big Adventure before arriving at its final name. Development spanned a total of nine months from conception to completion. Crash Bandicoot: The Huge Adventure was released in North America in the first quarter of 2002, (Note: Sources give differing dates for the game's release, including February 26, March 1, and March 13.) and is the first Crash Bandicoot title to be released on a handheld console. In Europe, the game was released under the title Crash Bandicoot XS on March 15, 2002.

== Reception ==
Reception

Aggregate score
Aggregator	Score
Metacritic	78/100

Review scores
Publication	Score
AllGame	3.5/5
Computer and Video Games	8/10
Electronic Gaming Monthly	6/10, 4.5/10, 7/10
Famitsu	8/10, 9/10, 8/10, 7/10
Game Informer	8.5/10
GamePro	4/5
GameSpot	7.4/10
GameSpy	86%
GameZone	9.2/10
IGN	9/10
Jeuxvideo.com	16/20
Nintendo Power	17.5/25

Crash Bandicoot: The Huge Adventure received generally positive reviews from critics. The review aggregator Metacritic reports that the game received an average score of 78 out of 100, indicating "generally favourable reviews".

Critics were generally united in lauding the game's transition to a handheld, side-scrolling format; Louis Bedigian of GameZone considered the series' adaptation to the Game Boy Advance to be highly successful; he praised the game's level design and replay value, and declared The Huge Adventure to be more fun than its PlayStation counterparts or the Super Mario Advance series. Craig Harris of IGN assessed the game's design as "amazingly tight with solid controls and level design" and appreciated the various gameplay styles and additional challenge provided by the Time Trials and hidden Gems. However, he mentioned that the flight levels (which he described as a "watered-down" After Burner) had imperfect collision detection, and he found fault in the game's lack of an auto-save feature or any prompting to save the game. Scott Osborne of GameSpy said that while the game was not innovative, it was executed well enough to remain entertaining. Andrew Reiner of Game Informer praised the "essentially perfect" incorporation of the gameplay intricacies of the PlayStation trilogy, but lamented the short length of the levels. Four-Eyed Dragon of GamePro commended the game as "a superb-looking, straightforward platformer that no interested GBA gamer should miss."

Giancarlo Varanini of GameSpot summarized the game as a basic but solid platformer that lacked the innovation of other Game Boy Advance platformers. Scott Alan Marriott of Allgame, while acknowledging the game's lack of innovation, stated that the translation of the gameplay and feel of the PlayStation Crash games onto the Game Boy Advance was executed well. A Nintendo Power reviewer noted that the game's challenges were generally more difficult and sometimes more frustrating than those of the Mario games. Play Magazine's reviewer criticized the "straight-ahead" nature of the side-scrolling, but called it "a great, little game" otherwise. Jeanne Kim, Shane Bettenhausen and James Mielke of Electronic Gaming Monthly were all frustrated by the game's trial-and-error gameplay, although Kim and Mielke acknowledged that the essence of the series was successfully captured. However, Bettenhausen felt that its gameplay and level design were dull and derivative and that the game was too short. Osborne and Four-Eyed Dragon found the controls to be slightly sluggish, and Varanini experienced particular difficulty with the double-jump maneuver.

The visuals were lauded for their hardware-pushing fluidity and detail, with Bedigian considering the graphics to be superior to those in classic SNES titles. While Varanini agreed with the general sentiment, he felt that the enemy characters were blandly colored and the levels lacked visual variety, although he considered the chase sequences to be a highlight. Bettenhausen, however, felt that the graphics were toned down to "merely average" compared to the PlayStation games, though he admired the pseudo-3D stages.

Bedigian commended the music as "excellent" and some of the best on the Game Boy Advance. Harris called the game's audio "amazingly clear". Osborne felt that the familiarity of the audio "breeds fun rather than contempt: it's hard not to smile when the witch doctor mask Aku Aku lets out his silly cry of "Ooga booga!"". Varanini was impressed by the faithful reproduction of the PlayStation trilogy's sound design, and deemed the music's clarity to be slightly higher than most Game Boy Advance titles, but felt that the individual tracks, with the possible exception of the ice stages, did not particularly stand out. Marriott noted the sound effects to be accurate, but considered the music to be less impressive than that of the PlayStation trilogy.

In the United States, Crash Bandicoot: The Huge Adventure sold 750,000 copies and earned $19 million by August 2006. During the period between January 2000 and August 2006, it was the 26th highest-selling game launched for the Game Boy Advance, Nintendo DS or PlayStation Portable in that country.
