= Bruce Lee: Return of the Legend =

2003 video game

- Cover art of Bruce Lee: Return of the Legend
- Developer(s): Vicarious Visions
- Publisher(s): Universal Interactive
- Platform(s): Game Boy Advance
- Release: EU: March 21, 2003; NA: May 15, 2003
- Genre(s): Beat 'em up
- Mode(s): Single-player

Bruce Lee: Return of the Legend is a 2003 action beat 'em up developed by Vicarious Visions for the Game Boy Advance. It was first published and released in Europe by Vivendi Universal Games on March 21, 2003, and was later published and released in North America on May 15, 2003.

== Gameplay ==
Player controls the well-known martial artist and movie actor, Bruce Lee, who plays the role of Hai Feng, a martial arts student, whose master was murdered by the hands of the Yakan organisation, making him run out for revenge. The side-scrolling beat 'em up was developed to play like a Bruce Lee movie, where players can make Bruce Lee perform several of his well-known moves between cut scenes that tell the compelling story, and fights set in original, yet familiar, landmarks. Players also can use Bruce Lee's abilities to flip-kick up ledges to higher ground or flip characters over his shoulder to knock out those behind him. The game will have the player fighting various enemies from all four sides of the screen, while exploring each level for various weapons such as nunchuks, while completing tasks to complete the level, such as finding a certain number of keys or saving hostages to defeating every enemy that is thrown at the player.

== Reception ==
Reception

Aggregate score
Aggregator	Score
Metacritic	82/100

Review scores
Publication	Score
IGN	8.4/10
NGC Magazine	71%
Nintendo Power	4.1/5

Bruce Lee: Return of the Legend received "generally favorable reviews" according to the review aggregation website Metacritic.

IGN said that it is "extremely solid, with well designed levels and a decent challenge all the way through." They also stated that the stealth portions "still seem out of place in a side-scroller, but they're not too disjointed in Bruce Lee." They concluded it to be the best Bruce Lee video game to date.
