= Jackie Chan Stuntmaster =

2000 video game

- Developer: Radical Entertainment
- Publishers: NA: Midway Games; EU: Sony Computer Entertainment
- Producers: Iain Ross; Stacy Allyn Hendrickson; Kirsten Forbes
- Designer: Galan Akin
- Programmer: Scott Andrews
- Artist: Rick Stringfellow
- Writers: Rick Hohn; Richard Side; Gary Fisher
- Composer: Graig Robertson
- Platform: PlayStation
- Release: NA: March 28, 2000; EU: May 17, 2000; UK: December 15, 2000
- Genres: Beat 'em up, platform
- Mode: Single-player

Jackie Chan Stuntmaster (titled Jackie Chan's Stuntmaster in PAL's in-game menu) is a 2000 beat 'em up platform video game developed by Radical Entertainment for the PlayStation. Midway Games released it in North America while Sony Computer Entertainment released it in Europe.

It stars martial artist Jackie Chan, who fights his way past numerous villains in different locations across New York City.

== Plot ==
Jackie's grandfather (Fredrick) has been kidnapped and Jackie needs to get him back. This means fighting his way through New York City to get to him. Jackie also faces a number of different challenges in which the player must use a combination of moves to succeed. The game boasts 15 fully 3D levels with different environmental obstacles to cross.

== Development ==
The game was showcased at E3 1999. While making the game, Radical Entertainment consulted Jackie at every point so as to give the game the feeling of a Jackie Chan film. This included using Jackie for motion capture, so that the character in the game was performing the same moves as the man himself. He also provided his voice for the game. Also, when the player completes the game with all of the golden dragons collected, a video is shown with Jackie talking about the game as well as behind-the-scenes footage during the motion capture.

== Reception ==
Reception

Aggregate score
Aggregator	Score
GameRankings	69%

Review scores
Publication	Score
AllGame	3.5/5
CNET Gamecenter	5/10
Electronic Gaming Monthly	5.875/10 (Note: In Electronic Gaming Monthly's early review of the game, one critic gave it 5/10, another gave it 5.5/10, and the rest gave it each a score of 6.5/10.)
EP Daily	8/10
Game Informer	6.5/10
GameFan	72%
GameSpot	6.7/10
IGN	8/10
Jeuxvideo.com	11/20
Next Generation	2/5
Official U.S. PlayStation Magazine	3.5/5
PlayStation: The Official Magazine	3/5
Entertainment Weekly	B

The game received "average" reviews according to the review aggregation website GameRankings. Jeff Lundrigan of NextGen criticized the game as "one of the least inventive beat-'em-ups in years" and concluded his early review in four words: "Jackie Chan deserves better." GameSpot gave it an average review two-and-a-half months before its release date. GamePro called it "a worthy workout that just lacks a 'wow' factor. It's a nice accompaniment to your Jackie Chan movie rental weekend. But if you're really into throwing fists and busting kicks, then Chan is your man." (Note: GamePro gave the game two 4/5 scores for graphics and sound, and two 3.5/5 scores for control and fun factor in an early review.)
