= List of Crash Bandicoot video games =

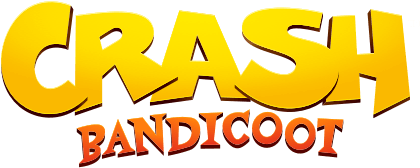
Logo of the Crash Bandicoot series

Crash Bandicoot is a video game series created by Naughty Dog and owned and published by Activision. The mainline entries are 3D platform games centered on the adventures of the anthropomorphic bandicoot Crash and his allies as they repeatedly thwart the schemes of the mad scientist Doctor Neo Cortex and his minions. The series originated with the 1996 release of Crash Bandicoot, which became a flagship title for the PlayStation console. It was followed by two sequels from Naughty Dog: Crash Bandicoot 2: Cortex Strikes Back in 1997 and Crash Bandicoot: Warped in 1998. The games were originally developed for the PlayStation, with later entries appearing on Microsoft and Nintendo platforms. Mainline series releases following Naughty Dog's departure include Crash Bandicoot: The Wrath of Cortex (2001) and Crash Twinsanity (2004) by Traveller's Tales, as well as Crash of the Titans (2007) and Crash: Mind over Mutant (2008) by Radical Entertainment. A sequel to the original trilogy, Crash Bandicoot 4: It's About Time, was developed by Toys for Bob and released in 2020. Another sequel developed by Toys for Bob was cancelled the same year partly due to Crash Bandicoot 4: It's About Time's commercial underperformance.

In addition to platformers, the series includes kart racing games, party games, crossover titles, and mobile spin-offs. Over the years, development has been handled by a wide range of studios including Naughty Dog, Eurocom, Traveller's Tales, Vicarious Visions, Radical Entertainment, Beenox, and Toys for Bob. The Crash Bandicoot series had sold over 40 million copies worldwide across all titles by 2007. Since then, the series has seen continued success, with Crash Bandicoot N. Sane Trilogy and Crash Team Racing Nitro-Fueled respectively selling 20 million and 10 million units.

== List of games ==
=== Console platformers ===
Console platformers
Game	Details
Crash Bandicoot Original release date(s): NA: September 9, 1996; EU: November 8, 1996	Release years by system: 1996 – PlayStation; 2006 – PlayStation Network
Crash Bandicoot Original release date(s): NA: September 9, 1996; EU: November 8, 1996	Notes: Developed by Naughty Dog and published by Sony Computer Entertainment
Crash Bandicoot 2: Cortex Strikes Back Original release date(s): NA: November 6, 1997; EU: December 5, 1997	Release years by system: 1997 – PlayStation; 2007 – PlayStation Network
Crash Bandicoot 2: Cortex Strikes Back Original release date(s): NA: November 6, 1997; EU: December 5, 1997	Notes: Developed by Naughty Dog and published by Sony Computer Entertainment
Crash Bandicoot: Warped Original release date(s): NA: November 3, 1998; EU: December 11, 1998	Release years by system: 1998 – PlayStation; 2008 – PlayStation Network
Crash Bandicoot: Warped Original release date(s): NA: November 3, 1998; EU: December 11, 1998	Notes: Developed by Naughty Dog and published by Sony Computer Entertainment
Crash Bandicoot: The Wrath of Cortex Original release date(s): NA: October 30, 2001; EU: November 30, 2001	Release years by system: 2001 – PlayStation 2; 2002 – Xbox, GameCube; 2007 – Xbox Originals
Crash Bandicoot: The Wrath of Cortex Original release date(s): NA: October 30, 2001; EU: November 30, 2001	Notes: Developed by Traveller's Tales and published by Universal Interactive Studios
Crash Twinsanity Original release date(s): NA: September 28, 2004; EU: October 8, 2004; AU: October 28, 2004	Release years by system: 2004 – PlayStation 2, Xbox
Crash Twinsanity Original release date(s): NA: September 28, 2004; EU: October 8, 2004; AU: October 28, 2004	Notes: Developed by Traveller's Tales Oxford and published by Vivendi Universal Games.
Crash of the Titans Original release date(s): NA: October 2, 2007; EU: October 12, 2007; AU: October 18, 2007	Release years by system: 2007 – PlayStation 2, Xbox 360, Wii, PlayStation Portable
Crash of the Titans Original release date(s): NA: October 2, 2007; EU: October 12, 2007; AU: October 18, 2007	Notes: Developed by Radical Entertainment and published by Sierra Entertainment
Crash: Mind over Mutant Original release date(s): NA: October 7, 2008; AU: October 30, 2008; EU: October 31, 2008	Release years by system: 2008 – PlayStation 2, PlayStation Portable, Xbox 360, Wii
Crash: Mind over Mutant Original release date(s): NA: October 7, 2008; AU: October 30, 2008; EU: October 31, 2008	Notes: Developed by Radical Entertainment and published by Sierra Entertainment
Crash Bandicoot 4: It's About Time Original release date(s): October 2, 2020	Release years by system: 2020 – PlayStation 4, Xbox One; 2021 – PlayStation 5, Xbox Series X and Series S, Nintendo Switch, Microsoft Windows
Crash Bandicoot 4: It's About Time Original release date(s): October 2, 2020	Notes: Developed by Toys for Bob and published by Activision

=== Handheld platformers ===
Handheld platformers
Game	Details
Crash Bandicoot: The Huge Adventure Original release date(s): NA: March 13, 2002; EU: March 15, 2002	Release years by system: 2002 – Game Boy Advance
Crash Bandicoot: The Huge Adventure Original release date(s): NA: March 13, 2002; EU: March 15, 2002	Notes: Developed by Vicarious Visions and published by Universal Interactive; Released as Crash Bandicoot XS in Europe
Crash Bandicoot 2: N-Tranced Original release date(s): NA: January 7, 2003; EU: March 2003	Release years by system: 2003 – Game Boy Advance
Crash Bandicoot 2: N-Tranced Original release date(s): NA: January 7, 2003; EU: March 2003	Notes: Developed by Vicarious Visions and published by Universal Interactive
Crash Bandicoot Purple: Ripto's Rampage Original release date(s): NA: June 1, 2004; EU: June 25, 2004	Release years by system: 2004 – Game Boy Advance
Crash Bandicoot Purple: Ripto's Rampage Original release date(s): NA: June 1, 2004; EU: June 25, 2004	Notes: Developed by Vicarious Visions and published by Vivendi Universal Games; Released as Crash Bandicoot: Fusion in Europe; Sibling title of Spyro Orange: The Cortex Conspiracy
Crash of the Titans Original release date(s): NA: October 2, 2007; EU: October 19, 2007; AU: October 25, 2007	Release years by system: 2007 – Nintendo DS
Crash of the Titans Original release date(s): NA: October 2, 2007; EU: October 19, 2007; AU: October 25, 2007	Notes: Developed by Griptonite Games and published by Sierra Entertainment
Crash of the Titans Original release date(s): NA: October 2, 2007; EU: October 12, 2007	Release years by system: 2007 – Game Boy Advance
Crash of the Titans Original release date(s): NA: October 2, 2007; EU: October 12, 2007	Notes: Developed by Amaze Entertainment and published by Vivendi Universal Games
Crash: Mind over Mutant Original release date(s): NA: October 7, 2008; AU: October 30, 2008; EU: October 31, 2008	Release years by system: 2008 – Nintendo DS
Crash: Mind over Mutant Original release date(s): NA: October 7, 2008; AU: October 30, 2008; EU: October 31, 2008	Notes: Developed by Tose and published by Activision

=== Racing games ===
Racing games
Game	Details
Crash Team Racing Original release date(s): NA: October 19, 1999; EU: December 1999	Release years by system: 1999 – PlayStation; 2007 – PlayStation Network
Crash Team Racing Original release date(s): NA: October 19, 1999; EU: December 1999	Notes: Developed by Naughty Dog and published by Sony Computer Entertainment; The last Crash Bandicoot game to be developed by Naughty Dog
Crash Nitro Kart Original release date(s): NA: November 11, 2003; EU: November 28, 2003	Release years by system: 2003 – PlayStation 2, Xbox, GameCube
Crash Nitro Kart Original release date(s): NA: November 11, 2003; EU: November 28, 2003	Notes: Developed by Vicarious Visions and published by Universal Interactive
Crash Nitro Kart Original release date(s): NA: November 11, 2003; EU: December 5, 2003	Release years by system: 2003 – Game Boy Advance; 2004 – N-Gage
Crash Nitro Kart Original release date(s): NA: November 11, 2003; EU: December 5, 2003	Notes: Developed by Vicarious Visions and published by Universal Interactive
Crash Tag Team Racing Original release date(s): NA: October 21, 2005; AU: November 3, 2005; EU: November 4, 2005	Release years by system: 2005 – PlayStation 2, GameCube, Xbox, PlayStation Portable
Crash Tag Team Racing Original release date(s): NA: October 21, 2005; AU: November 3, 2005; EU: November 4, 2005	Notes: Developed by Radical Entertainment and published by Vivendi Universal Games
Crash Team Racing Nitro-Fueled Original release date(s): June 21, 2019	Release years by system: 2019 – PlayStation 4, Xbox One, Nintendo Switch
Crash Team Racing Nitro-Fueled Original release date(s): June 21, 2019	Notes: A remaster of Crash Team Racing (1999) developed by Beenox and published by Activision

=== Other games ===
Other games
Game	Details
Crash Bash Original release date(s): NA: November 8, 2000; EU: November 29, 2000	Release years by system: 2000 – PlayStation
Crash Bash Original release date(s): NA: November 8, 2000; EU: November 29, 2000	Notes: Party game developed by Eurocom Entertainment Software and published by Sony Computer Entertainment; The first Crash Bandicoot game to be developed without Naughty Dog's involvement; The last Crash Bandicoot game to be released exclusively for a Sony console.
Crash Boom Bang! Original release date(s): JP: July 20, 2006; NA: October 10, 2006	Release years by system: 2006 – Nintendo DS
Crash Boom Bang! Original release date(s): JP: July 20, 2006; NA: October 10, 2006	Notes: Party game developed by Dimps and published by Vivendi Universal Games; Released as Crash Bandicoot Festival in Japan
Crash Bandicoot N. Sane Trilogy Original release date(s): June 30, 2017	Release years by system: 2017 – PlayStation 4; 2018 – Microsoft Windows, Nintendo Switch, Xbox One
Crash Bandicoot N. Sane Trilogy Original release date(s): June 30, 2017	Notes: A compilation of remasters of Crash Bandicoot, Crash Bandicoot 2: Cortex Strikes Back, and Crash Bandicoot: Warped developed by Vicarious Visions and published by Activision.
Crash Team Rumble Original release date(s): June 20, 2023	Release years by system: 2023 – PlayStation 4, PlayStation 5, Xbox One, Xbox Series X/S
Crash Team Rumble Original release date(s): June 20, 2023	Notes: Four-versus-four online multiplayer game developed by Toys for Bob and published by Activision Blizzard

=== Mobile games ===
Mobile games
Game	Details
Crash Bandicoot Original release date(s): April 2003	Release years by system: 2003 – ExEn
Crash Bandicoot Original release date(s): April 2003	Notes: Action game developed by Kaolink and published by In-Fusio
Crash Nitro Kart Original release date(s): October 2004	Release years by system: 2004 – Mobile
Crash Nitro Kart Original release date(s): October 2004	Notes: Racing game developed and published by Digital Bridges
Crash Twinsanity Original release date(s): December 2004	Release years by system: 2004 – Vodafone live!
Crash Twinsanity Original release date(s): December 2004	Notes: Side-scrolling platformer developed by Vivendi Universal Games and published by Kuju Entertainment
Crash Racing Original release date(s): August 2006	Release years by system: 2006 – Mobile
Crash Racing Original release date(s): August 2006	Notes: Racing game developed by Kaolink and published by Vivendi Games Mobile
Crash Bandicoot MiniGames Original release date(s): March 2007	Release years by system: 2007 – Mobile
Crash Bandicoot MiniGames Original release date(s): March 2007	Notes: Party game published by Vivendi Games Mobile; Originally developed as a mobile version of Crash Boom Bang!
Crash of the Titans Original release date(s): October 2007	Release years by system: 2007 – Mobile
Crash of the Titans Original release date(s): October 2007	Notes: Platformer developed by Devalley Entertainment and published by Vivendi Games Mobile
Crash Bandicoot Nitro Kart 3D Original release date(s): April 29, 2008	Release years by system: 2008 – Java, Symbian, iOS; 2009 – N-Gage
Crash Bandicoot Nitro Kart 3D Original release date(s): April 29, 2008	Notes: Racing game developed by Polarbit and published by Vivendi Games Mobile
Crash Bandicoot: Mutant Island Original release date(s): July 2009	Release years by system: 2009 – Java Platform, Micro Edition
Crash Bandicoot: Mutant Island Original release date(s): July 2009	Notes: Platformer developed by Vivendi Games Mobile and published by Glu Mobile
Crash Bandicoot Nitro Kart 2 Original release date(s): May 27, 2010	Release years by system: 2010 – iOS
Crash Bandicoot Nitro Kart 2 Original release date(s): May 27, 2010	Notes: Racing game developed by Polarbit and published by Activision
Crash Bandicoot: On the Run! Original release date(s): March 23, 2021	Release years by system: 2021 – iOS, Android
Crash Bandicoot: On the Run! Original release date(s): March 23, 2021	Notes: Endless runner developed by King and published by Activision

== Canceled games ==
Canceled games
Game	Details
Crash Tag Team Racing Cancellation date: 2005	Proposed system release: Nintendo DS
Crash Tag Team Racing Cancellation date: 2005	Notes: Racing game developed by Sensory Sweep Studios; Canceled near its completion to avoid competition with Mario Kart DS
Crash Team Racing Cancellation date: 2010	Proposed system release: N/A
Crash Team Racing Cancellation date: 2010	Notes: Racing game developed by High Impact Games; Planned as a reboot of the Crash racing games; Later reworked into DreamWorks Super Star Kartz
Crash Bandicoot 5 Cancellation date: 2020	Proposed system release: N/A
Crash Bandicoot 5 Cancellation date: 2020	Notes: Single-player platformer developed by Toys for Bob; Featured a crossover with Spyro the Dragon; Canceled due to low sales of Crash Bandicoot 4: It's About Time and Activision's shift in focus toward live service games

== Related games ==
Related games
Game	Details
Uncharted 4: A Thief's End Original release date(s): May 10, 2016	Release years by system: 2016 – PlayStation 4; 2022 – PlayStation 5, Windows
Uncharted 4: A Thief's End Original release date(s): May 10, 2016	Notes: Video game developed by Naughty Dog and published by Sony Computer Entertainment; Features a recreation of the original Crash Bandicoot level "Boulders"
Skylanders: Imaginators Original release date(s): NA: October 16, 2016; UK: October 14, 2016; AU: October 13, 2016	Release years by system: 2016 – PlayStation 3, PlayStation 4, Xbox 360, Xbox One, Wii U 2017 – Nintendo Switch
Skylanders: Imaginators Original release date(s): NA: October 16, 2016; UK: October 14, 2016; AU: October 13, 2016	Notes: Toys-to-life game developed by Toys for Bob and published by Activision; The PlayStation 3 and PlayStation 4 versions feature Crash Bandicoot and Doctor Neo Cortex as playable characters.
Astro Bot Original release date(s): September 6, 2024	Release years by system: 2024 – PlayStation 5
Astro Bot Original release date(s): September 6, 2024	Notes: Platform game developed by Team Asobi and published by Sony Interactive Entertainment; Features a cameo appearance by Crash Bandicoot as a character costume
