= Crash: Mind over Mutant (Nintendo DS video game) =

2008 video game

- Developer: Tose
- Publishers: NA: Activision; PAL: Vivendi Games (Note: Released under the Sierra Entertainment brand.)
- Director: Josh Esquibel
- Producer: Glenn Dphrepaulezz
- Designer: Patrick Hook
- Composer: Morihiro Iwamoto
- Series: Crash Bandicoot
- Platform: Nintendo DS
- Release: NA: October 7, 2008; AU: October 30, 2008; EU: October 31, 2008
- Genre: Platform
- Modes: Single-player, multiplayer

Crash: Mind over Mutant is a 2008 video game developed by Tose for the Nintendo DS. It is an installment in the Crash Bandicoot series and an alternate version of the console-based title of the same name developed by Radical Entertainment.

Like the console version, the game centers on the titular character Crash Bandicoot, who subdues and takes control of large mutants by attacking them in a process called "jacking", which entails him mounting the mutants and using their abilities. Both versions share an emphasis on this mechanic, though compared to the console version, an open world 3D platformer, the Nintendo DS version is a 2.5D side-scroller with a minimal plot.

The game was received unfavorably by critics who regarded it as a regression from the series' previous Nintendo DS installment. They highlighted its uninspired gameplay and level design, weak audio and negligible narrative. Responses to the visuals were more mixed, with some complimenting its polish and others criticizing its animation and technical shortcomings.

== Gameplay ==
Crash riding a Mutant in an example of gameplay in Crash: Mind over Mutant

The Nintendo DS version of Crash: Mind over Mutant is a single-player side-scrolling 2.5D platformer in which the player controls Crash Bandicoot, who must defeat Doctor Neo Cortex and foil his plot to control the minds of Crash's friends. Crash moves left or right and is equipped with a series of offensive maneuvers for attacking enemies. The player can receive tips and clues by touching Aku Aku on the bottom screen.

Crash will occasionally encounter a larger and stronger enemy known as a Mutant, which he can attack until the Mutant is stunned. At this point, Crash can mount (or "jack") the Mutant and control it to use its abilities. Each Mutant is capable of four special attacks, the controls for which are displayed by pressing the paw print on the bottom screen. The pocket icon on the touch screen can be touched to store the Mutant or to bring out the stored Mutant.

Crash's health (displayed as a bar on the top-left corner of the screen) can be restored by collecting Wumpa Fruit, which also restore the health of jacked Mutants. In addition to health, jacked Mutants also have a special attack gauge that slowly regenerates over time and is depleted whenever a Mutant uses a special attack. Collecting Mojo scattered across the levels fills Crash's Mojo Gauge, which when filled can grant Crash a temporary Super Strength state that endows him with faster movement and stronger attacks, and lasts until the Mojo Gauge is depleted. Super Strength is activated by touching the Crash icon on the bottom screen. A filled Mojo Gauge can upgrade the Mutant's abilities while it is jacked, though the final upgrade requires a gem that is obtained by defeating a world's boss.

The game's levels are accessed from a map screen and divided by a series of worlds, with each world culminating in a boss encounter. The halfway point of a level is signified by a checkpoint represented by a crate with a check mark. Each level includes a bonus platform that transports Crash to a course in which he must reach the end within the time limit to receive costumes and enhanced abilities. The bonus levels are littered with Nitro Crates that explode on contact, sending Crash back to the regular level. Stages marked by an orange star are bonus stages that grant easy access to a world's Mutant and a significant amount of Mojo.

Three minigames are available to play from the main menu, all of which use the touch screen. Multiplayer gameplay is possible with up to three other human players via local wireless. In "Rolling for Wumpa", players collect Wumpa Fruit by shaking trees and pounding the ground; in "Give Them the Boot", players score points by kicking objects into Cortex's ship; and in "Crash Kaboom", players score points by throwing bombs at enemies on the other side of the playing field. The "Mutant Fight" mode involves two players connected via local wireless, who must each select a Mutant and engage in combat based on one of three rule sets; players must either bring their opponent's gem count to zero, be the first to reach a specific amount of gems collected, or have the most gems within the time limit.

== Development and release ==
Crash: Mind over Mutant was developed by an uncredited Tose, with Radical Entertainment's Glenn Dphrepaulezz serving as producer. While the console version is an open world 3D platformer, Radical chose to stray from that gameplay style for the Nintendo DS in favor of creating a 2D platformer that played to the DS's strengths; according to Dphrepaulezz, this direction was influenced by Tose's extensive experience developing for the platform. Connectivity with the Wii version was planned and tested but discarded for lack of functionality. Sierra Entertainment announced Crash: Mind over Mutant on April 28, 2008, and the game was released in North America on October 7, in Australia on October 30, and in Europe on October 31.

== Reception ==
Reception

Aggregate score
Aggregator	Score
Metacritic	45/100

Review scores
Publication	Score
GameZone	4.4/10
IGN	3.2/10
Jeuxvideo.com	5/20
Nintendo World Report	4/10
Pocket Gamer	4/10

Reviews for Crash: Mind over Mutant were "generally unfavorable" according to review aggregator Metacritic. Mike David of GameZone found it to be the first Crash title to disappoint him and deemed it "lacking in innovation, gameplay and fun". Mike Cook of Pocket Gamer called it "another poor seasonal outing" for the franchise and recommended that players look elsewhere to avoid disappointment. Neal Ronaghan of Nintendo World Report regarded it as a competent but unremarkable platformer suitable only for Crash Bandicoot fans and DS platformer enthusiasts. Craig Harris of IGN condemned the game's "lifeless" execution in comparison to both Amaze Entertainment's version of Crash of the Titans on the same system and the Game Boy Advance installments by Vicarious Visions, and he interpreted the developer's lack of credit in the game as embarrassment for having been involved in its production. Clément Le Hyaric of JV, for whom Tose's previous work on Super Princess Peach was cause for anticipation, called it a "veritable gaming wreck" that failed to capitalize on Amaze Entertainment's work on Crash of the Titans.

Reviewers criticized the gameplay and level design as repetitive, uninspired and unchallenging. David called the game's side-scrolling 2D platformer format a "giant leap backwards" from the previous Nintendo DS installment, describing the level design as bland and inane. Cook and Ronaghan highlighted the quickness of clearing the levels, with Cook noting that the game was short despite the number of levels. Harris said that the "rigid and boring" level design offered little incentive to engage in combat, with the sequences requiring it feeling forced and arbitrary. Le Hyaric regarded the game as a failed attempt to return to the roots of its genre's golden age that only succeeded in extracting its clichés, namely its repetitive action, uninteresting level design and erratic difficulty. David was frustrated by the bonus levels' difficulty, and Harris and Le Hyaric dismissed the minigames as trivial and outdated, whereas Cook praised both for adding replayability while acknowledging their optional and easily ignorable nature. David and Ly Hyaric noted the minimal stylus use; while David was relieved that the game avoided forced stylus mechanics, he lamented the missed opportunity for meaningful touch controls.

The jacking mechanic was determined to be underutilized and less effective than in the console versions. David said that while that the mutants were useful, their implementation lacked the depth of the console versions, contributing to the game's lack of fun. Cook considered the jacking mechanic fun but overly powerful, making the game too easy and reducing the need to play as Crash, which undermined the platforming experience. Ronaghan also felt that the heavy focus on mutants overshadowed Crash, making him feel like a secondary character. He regarded the need for specific mutants to progress or defeat bosses as a frustrating design flaw. Le Hyaric described the mutants as rare, lacking variety, and serving only as stronger alternatives to Crash without their previous puzzle-solving roles.

Reactions to the visuals were mixed. While David praised the clean character models and polished visuals, he noted that significant slowdown and lag negated these positives. Cook criticized the "splotchy" graphics as outdated compared to the Final Fantasy III and IV remakes. Harris still kindly regarded Crash's redesign, but deemed the 3D engine a regression from the previous year's installment. Le Hyaric considered the graphics the game's sole positive; he praised the pleasant 2D environments and fluid scrolling, but found the Mutant animation lacking.

The audio was heavily criticized. David was dismayed by the lack of fun music, sound effects and "verbal attitude", considering it a failure to capture Crash's personality. Harris called the character vocalizations annoying and the music poorly suited to the Crash series. Le Hyaric labeled the soundtrack one of the worst on the DS, with uninspired and repetitive music and inappropriate, bizarre sound effects. Cook, however, noted that the game sounded "bright, fun and lively", seeing it as a remnant of the series' old charm.

The lack of story and humor were also poorly received. David called the storyline non-existent and confusing, and the sentiment was shared by Le Hyaric, who noted that beyond the opening cutscene, the game abandoned both the story and the series' characteristic humor. Cook regarded the story as bizarre and irrelevant, figuring that players would skip it to focus on gameplay. Harris criticized the story as stupidly told, deriding it as "talking heads that look like they're having an epileptic seizure, with character grunts and groans instead of full voice-over".
