= Crash of the Titans =

2007 video game

- North America cover art, depicting Crash jacking a Ratcicle
- Developer: Radical Entertainment (Note: Ported to PlayStation Portable by SuperVillain Studios)
- Publisher: Vivendi Games (Note: Released under the Sierra Entertainment brand name)
- Designer: Joe McGinn
- Programmers: Ryan Ridout; Ian Gipson
- Artist: Yousuf Mapara
- Writer: Chris Mitchell
- Composer: Marc Baril
- Series: Crash Bandicoot
- Platforms: PlayStation 2; Wii; Xbox 360; PlayStation Portable
- Release: PlayStation 2, Wii, Xbox 360: NA: October 2, 2007; EU: October 12, 2007; AU: October 18, 2007; AU: October 25, 2007 (Wii); PlayStation Portable: NA: October 2, 2007; AU: November 22, 2007
- Genres: Platform, beat 'em up
- Modes: Single-player, multiplayer

Crash of the Titans is a 2007 platform game developed by Radical Entertainment and published by Vivendi Games for the PlayStation 2, PlayStation Portable, Wii and Xbox 360. The sixth mainline game in the Crash Bandicoot series, it was the last to be published by Vivendi Games before Activision merged with the company the following year. Amaze Entertainment developed two separate versions of the game: one for the Nintendo DS and one for the Game Boy Advance. The game is the fourteenth installment in the Crash Bandicoot video game series, and the sixth game in the main franchise.

The game's story centers on the discovery of a substance known as "Mojo", which series antagonist Doctor Neo Cortex and his niece Nina harvest to turn the inhabitants of the Wumpa Islands into an army of ferocious mutants known as "Titans". The protagonist of the series, Crash Bandicoot, must stop Cortex and Nina by using the technique of "jacking" to take control of and destroy the Titans while collecting mojo; he must also rescue his sister Coco, who has been kidnapped and forced to help build a doomsday machine that will assist the Titans in Cortex and Nina's bid for world domination.

Crash of the Titans received mixed reviews upon release. Although the jacking mechanic, visuals, voice acting, and humor were received positively by most critics, the game's combat system and nonadjustable camera were criticized. The game was nominated for three awards. A sequel, Crash: Mind over Mutant, was released in 2008.

== Gameplay ==
Crash Bandicoot and "Carbon Crash" have jacked the Titans Snipe and Spike, respectively.

Crash of the Titans is a platformer that emphasizes beat 'em up combat over traditional exploration. The player controls Crash Bandicoot as he navigates linear levels (known as "episodes") on Wumpa Island, divided into themed environments such as jungles and lava fields. Episodes proceed along narrow paths hemmed in on each side, interspersing arena-style battles against groups of mutant enemies, known as Titans, with brief platforming sequences. The camera is fixed and non-adjustable, centered primarily on Crash.

Combat forms the primary focus, shifting from Crash's earlier spin-based attacks to a beat 'em up system featuring punches, kicks, blocking, dodging, and charged heavy attacks. Light attacks enable quick combos to build damage, while heavy attacks break enemy guards or stun Titans. Titans display a star meter above their heads that fills with sustained attacks; if uninterrupted, the meter depletes, and the Titan regains health. Filling the meter stuns the Titan, allowing Crash to "jack" it by mounting and placing Aku Aku, his protective mask companion, over its face, granting full control. There are fifteen distinct Titans with unique abilities, combos, and special moves, enabling players to destroy obstacles, defeat stronger enemies, or solve simple environmental challenges like activating switches. Players can chain jacks, using a smaller Titan to stun and control a larger one, particularly in boss encounters. Jacked Titans possess a Titan Meter that enables a special attack when fully charged. Defeating enemies or destroying objects yields orbs of "Mojo", which accumulate to unlock ability upgrades for Crash such as extended spins, headbutts, or combo chains. Platforming incorporates double jumps, ledge grabs, wall jumps, and a spinning maneuver for gliding over gaps. Aku Aku doubles as a hoverboard for grinding rails or speeding through sections.

Crash starts the game with four lives. The length of each of Crash's lives is tied to his health meter, which decreases whenever Crash is damaged from enemy attacks or falls down a bottomless pit. The player can replenish Crash's health meter by collecting Wumpa Fruit. Each time the health meter is fully depleted, Crash loses a life. However, the player can gain an additional life for Crash by accumulating a certain amount of Mojo or by collecting a rare type of Golden Wumpa Fruit. After the last life is lost, the player can continue playing by restarting the current episode.

Episodes conclude with a ranking (represented by a bronze, silver, or gold voodoo doll) based on secondary goals: defeating a quota of enemies, destroying three surveillance robots per level, and achieving a minimum combo length. Gold rankings require fulfilling all three tasks in one run. Hidden voodoo dolls unlock concept art packages when collected. Each episode contains a portal leading to a simple mini-game arena, where the player must accomplish a task in a set time. Generally the task involves collecting a specified quantity of Mojo, jacking a titan and using its abilities, or simply defeating a select number of enemies.

A player using a second controller can join the game at any time in the form of a white-furred version of Crash known as "Carbon Crash". The second player appears in the first player's backpack, and can usually enter or exit the pack. However, the second player has to stay in the backpack if the first player is in mid-air or climbing a wall. This method of play is useful for overpowering enemies and collecting Mojo faster. There are two modes of co-op play; in "Leapfrog Mode", the players swap control each time the front player jumps, swings, or slides, while in "Piggyback Mode", each player is equipped with their own backpack and can hide in the other player's backpack if the action becomes too intense, such as when jumping over a chasm.

== Plot ==
As Crash aids Coco with a butter-recycling device, Doctor Neo Cortex arrives in an airship, capturing Aku Aku and Coco and encasing Crunch in ice. Crash chucks Coco's machine at Cortex's airship, detaching the chain holding Aku Aku's cage. After Crash finds and rescues Aku Aku in the nearby forest, they discover that Cortex and Uka Uka are stealing Mojo from a nearby temple and decide to stop them. On reaching the temple, Cortex reveals his plot to use the stolen Mojo to create an army of loyal mutants, which will be used to build the Doominator, a colossal robot that will destroy Wumpa Island and conquer the world. After failing to defeat Crash with his Yuktopus cyborg, Cortex boasts that Crash will never find his base and flies off, leaving Crash and Aku Aku to follow him.

At Cortex's base, Uka Uka derides Cortex for failing to destroy Crash and replaces Cortex with his niece, Nina Cortex, despite protests from Cortex, N. Gin and Tiny Tiger. Nina has Coco brainwashed and makes her participate in the construction of the Doominator. Crash and Aku Aku defeat and interrogate Tiny Tiger, Doctor N. Gin, and Uka Uka for Coco's whereabouts. When they confront Nina inside the Doominator robot, she summons her Arachnina cyborg and fights Crash. Crash eventually destroys the robot, liberates Coco, and disables the Doominator. The Doominator collapses and barely misses the Bandicoot home (and Crunch), sparing much of Wumpa Island. Escaping from the collapsed Doominator, Cortex praises Nina for betraying him, and promises to be more evil in the near future. The Bandicoots decide to celebrate their victory.

== Development ==
Crash of the Titans was developed by Radical Entertainment and published by Vivendi Games under its Sierra Entertainment label. Development began immediately following the completion of Crash Tag Team Racing, and was conducted by the same team behind the preceding title as well as The Simpsons: Hit & Run. Lead designer Joe McGinn explained that the game's focus on action-oriented gameplay and the jacking mechanic was influenced by an aim to recapture the difficulty of the original Crash Bandicoot trilogy while accommodating for advances in gameplay since that time. The development team sought to achieve this by granting Crash a wider variety of fighting moves, which they described as "Street Fighter lite"; McGinn elaborated that while the combat system would lack the hardcore appeal of Soulcalibur, it would be deep enough for skilled gamers to explore. He added that the jacking mechanic would grant Crash more moves than he would have on his own, as well as appeal to a gamer's sense of fairness. To achieve this, all the Titans' moves were constructed with the mindset that the player would be using them. Designer Josh Mitchell acknowledged that the level design lacks traditional puzzles due to the emphasis on combat, though elements requiring the use of a certain Titan's abilities were incorporated. The Wii version of the game incorporates the console's motion control feature, with the gestures being designed to feel natural, be completely reliable, and to not tire the player; gestures that would be better served by a button press were avoided. Several projectile-wielding Titans were designed to take advantage of the Wii Remote's "light gun" pointing interface. The Xbox 360 version includes over 40 achievements designed to accommodate various gaming styles. The PlayStation 2 version was the development team's fourth title for the console.

The series cast was redesigned with a unified "punk" edge for Crash of the Titans.

Art director Yousuf Mapara acknowledged great difficulty in developing a strong artistic direction for three technologically different consoles. The art team decided to base the game's presentation around the principles of traditional art rather than focus on the available technology. With this in mind, the concept art was primarily created around lighting composition, color theory, graceful shapes, and areas of focus. The Xbox 360's more powerful hardware allowed for more subtle features such as depth of field, motion blur, heat shimmer, softer shaders, soft shadows, and soft particles, which necessitated two extra months of development time to improve the visuals. Concerning the characters' redesign, producer Kirsten Forbes noted that the cast had gone through several iterations over the course of the series, and the team sought to realign the characters into a unified style as well as make them more modern and distinct from other cartoon characters; in summary, she described the new designs as having a "punk" edge to them.

The game includes 7,000 lines of dialogue, with the intent of limiting repetition and encouraging players to battle enemies for their humorous responses. Though writer Chris Mitchell found this task challenging, the focus on comedic depth granted by amusing character flaws made it attainable. Much of the voice actors from Crash Tag Team Racing reprised their roles, including Jess Harnell as Crash, Lex Lang as Cortex, Debi Derryberry as Coco, Nolan North as N. Gin, and Amy Gross as Nina. Chris Williams, along with reprising his role as Crunch, also voices Tiny. Greg Eagles inherited the role of Aku Aku from Mel Winkler, while John DiMaggio voiced Uka Uka. Tom Kenny voices several enemy characters in the game. A 32-track soundtrack, composed by Marc Baril, was made available on the iTunes Music Store on December 18, 2007.

== Marketing and release ==
During the game's development, Vivendi Games entered a partnership with the Leukemia & Lymphoma Society, and on August 6, 2007, they jointly announced that Crash Bandicoot would serve as a mascot for the Society's "School and Youth" programs, with Crash appearing on the programs' web site and printed materials. A Hummer with a playable Wii inside was painted with imagery from the game and displayed at the Annual Balloon Fiesta in Bristol, United Kingdom.

The game was revealed in a pre-alpha state in April 2007, and was showcased at E3 2007. It was released for the Xbox 360, PlayStation 2, and Wii in North America on October 2, 2007, in Europe on October 12, and in Australia on October 18 for the Xbox 360 and PlayStation 2; the Wii version was released in Australia on October 25, while the PlayStation Portable version was released there on November 22. A "Monster Edition" of the game was released exclusively in Europe for the PlayStation 2. This special edition of the game features "Making-of" videos, water-on tattoos, game hints, a cheat code list, and the game's E3 and theatrical trailers in multiple languages.

== Reception ==
Reception

Aggregate score
Aggregator	Score
Metacritic	PS2: 70/100; Wii: 69/100; X360: 65/100

Review scores
Publication	Score
Eurogamer	5/10
Game Informer	7.25/10
GameRevolution	C+
GameSpot	7/10
GameZone	Wii: 6.8/10; X360: 6.4/10
IGN	6.5/10; PSP: 6.3/10
Nintendo World Report	Wii: 7/10
PALGN	PS2: 6.5/10

Crash of the Titans received "mixed or average" reviews upon its release, according to Metacritic. Critics felt that the game's combat, despite the jacking mechanic adding a unique flavor to the gameplay, quickly became repetitive due to the game's lack of puzzles and exploration. They added that the combat was unbalanced by an abundance of enemy characters with inconsistent AI. Brian Rowe of GameRevolution and Ryan Davis of GameSpot deemed the platforming easy and predictable, and Davis felt that the game lacked a distinct personality, saying that "you could swap Crash out for any number of other cartoony platforming heroes and not really know the difference". The game's co-op mode was considered to be enjoyable, though Rowe found the Leapfrog mode to be "wholly disorienting", and Matt Keller of PALGN deemed the multiplayer mode to be superfluous and not well-implemented. Mike Thomsen of Nintendo World Report observed a slight lag in some of the Wii version's motion controls, which he said highlighted the fact that not all of the game's control's were specifically calibrated to take advantage of the Wii Remote. The camera was criticized for its lack of adjustability, which would often result in attacks by enemy characters outside of the player's range of vision.

The visuals were generally assessed positively. Thomsen complimented the game's "wacky and detailed" art direction, elaborating that "The game looks like a kind of Tim Burton tropical fantasy with looping tendrils and exaggerated angles crammed into the game's twenty-some levels". Davis considered the Xbox 360 version to have the best visuals based on its textures, lighting and particle effects, and added that while the PS2 and Wii versions were similar in presentation, he opined that the Wii version had better particle effects and looked better on a high-definition display. Periera and Michael Knutson of GameZone commended the character models and animations as sharp and well-done, but considered the environments to be bland, although Periera was impressed by the levels' focal points. Dakota Grabowski, also of GameZone, complimented the environmental textures and lighting, but admitted to not having been won over by the character redesigns, and said that "a lot of the up-close environments look dismal". Keller considered the character models and animation to be the most detailed in the series, and commended the color palette and large levels. Rowe, while lamenting the linearity of the levels, praised the color and liveliness of the settings. The motion blur effects added to Crash in the Xbox 360 version were derided as excessive.

The audio was met with mixed responses, though reactions to the voice acting and humor were mostly positive. Thomsen praised the game's "kooky Danny Elfman-esque" score, exaggerated voice-acting, sophisticated writing and variety of enemy voice lines. Davis and Grabowski felt that the voice cast was strong and lent a good amount of humor to the game. Periera acknowledged the dialogue of the minion characters as funny but dated. Rowe claimed that the game "might be the first script since Ratchet & Clank that made me laugh out loud", but considered Greg Eagles' performance as Aku Aku to be a "gratingly poor" impersonation of Aqua Teen Hunger Force character Frylock. Knutson and Keller dismissed the soundtrack as forgettable and criticized the voice-acting as annoying; Keller elaborated that "Crash, who is supposed to be a deranged bandicoot, sounds more like a confused baby. Other characters such as Coco have really annoying voices that make you want to take a power drill to your temple to make the pain stop. The only voices that have any merit are the smaller creatures in the first five levels, who sound a lot like Jerry Lewis from The Nutty Professor".

=== Sales and awards ===
In Australia, Crash of the Titans was the second highest-selling game in its first week below Halo 3. The game was not as successful in the United Kingdom, where the PS2 version of the game debuted at #32 in the sales charts. The game made £3.35 million in the UK by the end of 2007.

Crash of the Titans was a nominee in the Writers Guild of America's inaugural video game writing awards, competing against Dead Head Fred, The Simpsons Game, The Witcher and World in Conflict; Dead Head Fred won the award. Crash of the Titans was also selected as a nominee in the "Best Sound Design" and "Best Character" categories of the Second Annual Elan Awards. It lost both awards to Skate and Mass Effect's Commander Shepard respectively.
