= Crash Bandicoot (character) =

Video game character

- Crash Bandicoot character
- Crash from Crash Bandicoot 4: It's About Time (2020)
- First game: Crash Bandicoot (1996)
- Created by: Andy Gavin; Jason Rubin
- Designed by: Charles Zembillas; Joe Pearson
- Voiced by: English: Brendan O'Brien (1996–2001); Carlos Alazraqui (1997); Chip Chinery (1999); Steve Blum (2003); Jess Harnell (2005–2021); Scott Whyte (2020–present); Eric Rogers (SA, season 1); Rhys Darby (SA, season 3); Japanese: Kappei Yamaguchi (1996–2006); Makoto Ishii (2006); Kunihiro Kawamoto (SA)

In-universe information
- Species: Eastern barred bandicoot
- Nationality: Australian

Crash Bandicoot is the title character and main protagonist of the Crash Bandicoot franchise. Introduced in the 1996 video game Crash Bandicoot, Crash is a mutant eastern barred bandicoot who was genetically enhanced by the series' main antagonist Doctor Neo Cortex and soon escaped from Cortex's castle after a failed experiment in the "Cortex Vortex". Throughout the series, Crash acts as the opposition against Cortex and his schemes for world domination. While Crash has a number of offensive maneuvers at his disposal, his most distinctive technique is one in which he spins like a tornado at high speeds and knocks away almost anything that he strikes.

Crash was created by Andy Gavin and Jason Rubin, and was originally designed by Charles Zembillas and Joe Pearson. Crash was intended to be a mascot character for Sony to use to compete against Nintendo's Mario and Sega's Sonic the Hedgehog. Before Crash was given his name (which stems from the visceral reaction to the character's destruction of boxes), he was referred to as "Willie the Wombat" for much of the duration of the first game's production. Crash has drawn comparisons to mascots such as Mario and Sonic the Hedgehog by reviewers. His animations have been praised, while his voice has faced criticism. He has been redesigned several times throughout many games, which have drawn mixed reactions.

== Concept and creation ==
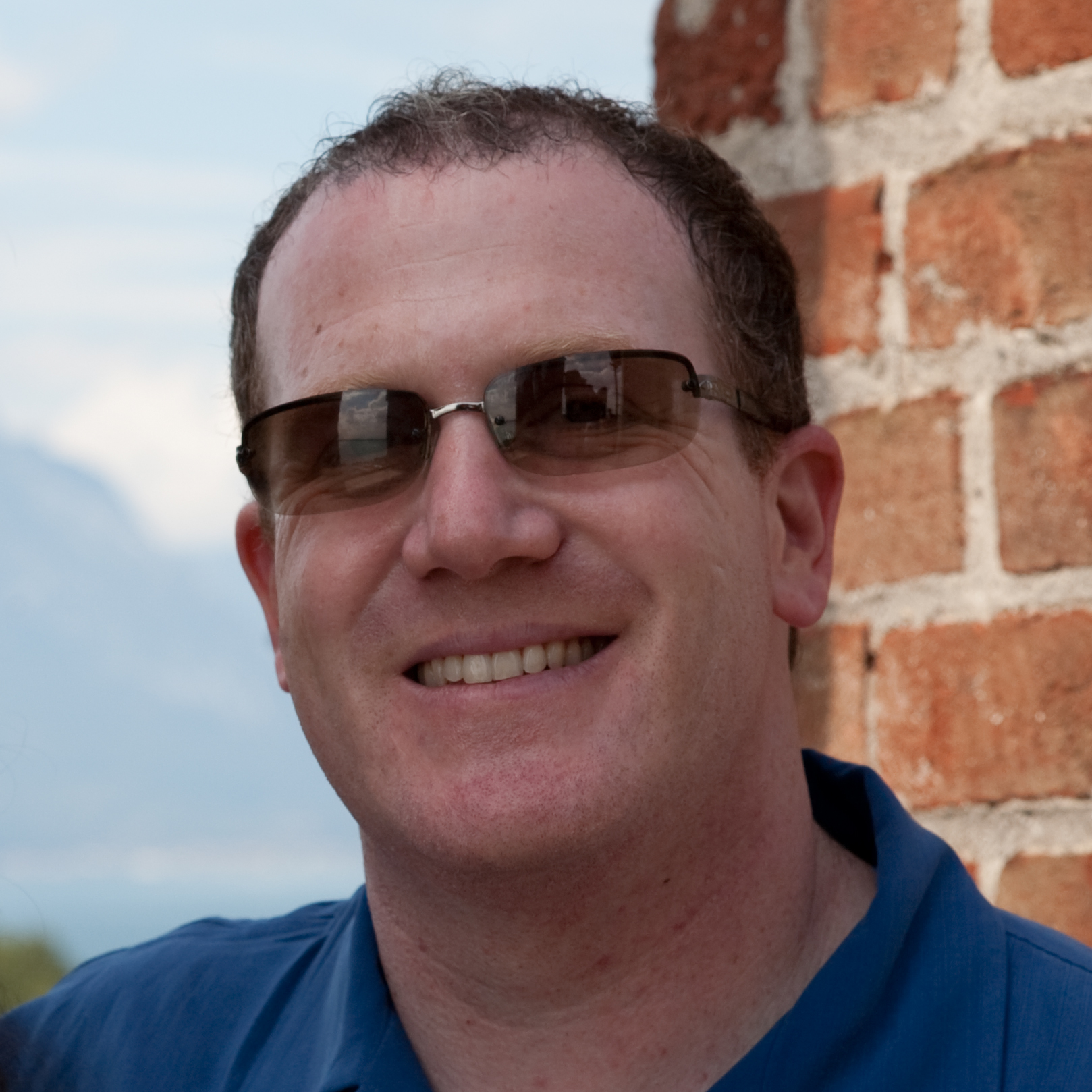
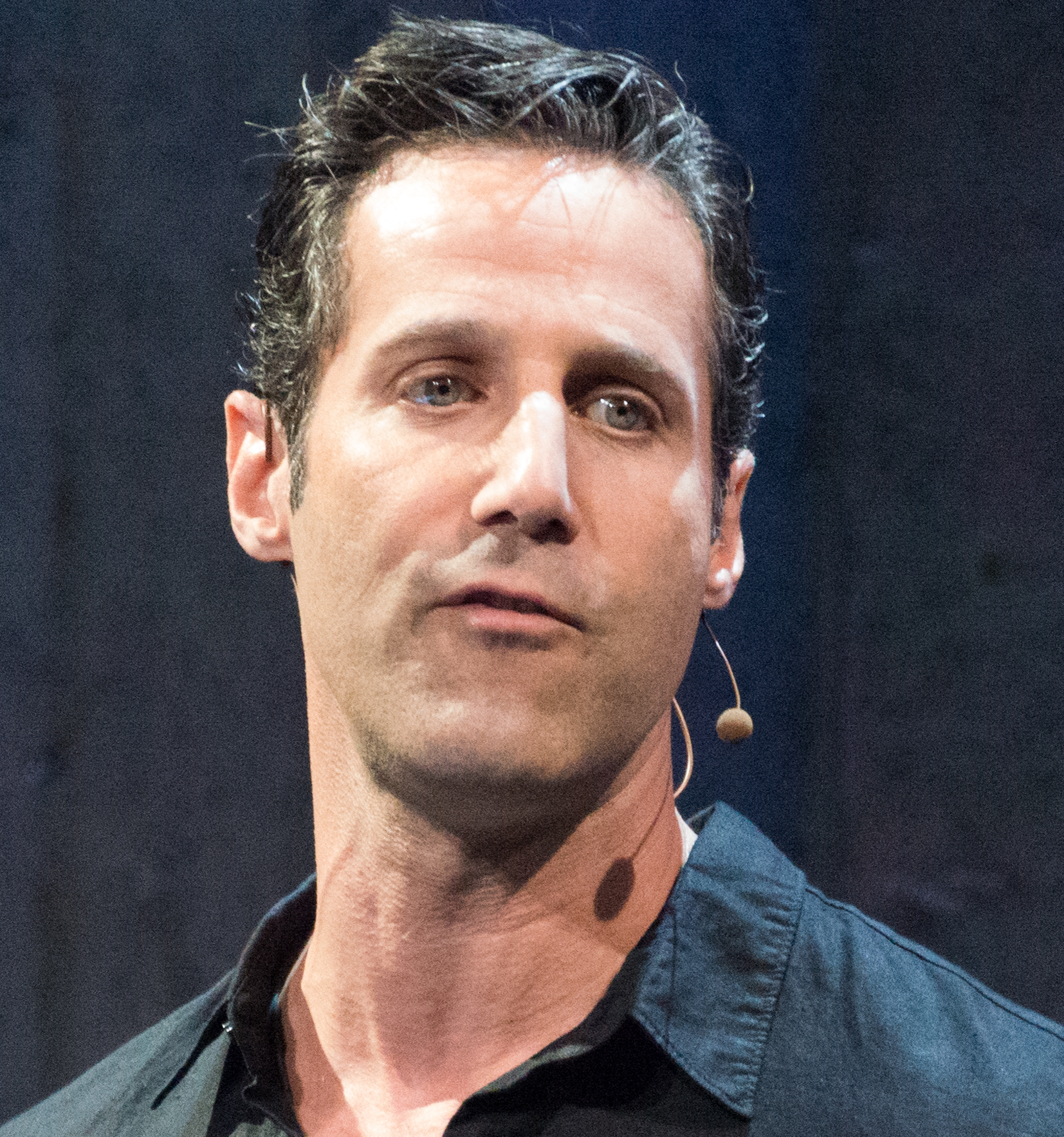
Andy Gavin (left) and Jason Rubin (right) created the character

One of the main reasons Naughty Dog chose to develop Crash Bandicoot (at the time jokingly codenamed "Sonic's Ass Game") for the Sony PlayStation was Sony's lack of an existing mascot character that could compete with Sega's Sonic the Hedgehog and Nintendo's Mario. By this time video game mascots were seen as increasingly unimportant, since they were overshadowed by cross-licensing and the aging games market meant most gamers were too old to find mascots appealing, but Sony were nonetheless interested in covering all bases. In Japan, Sony had used Captain Rock from Motor Toon Grand Prix as a de facto mascot during PlayStation's launch, although SCEA chose not to and instead introduced the purpose-made Polygon Man. Following a negative reception, SCEA picked Sofia from Battle Arena Toshinden as a mascot. Later in Japan, MuuMuu from Jumping Flash! was a de facto mascot. Sony brought out their in-house Mario/Sonic-like platformer, Hermie Hopperhead: Scrap Panic, in 1995, but this was not released outside Japan due to SCEA's strict policy at the time against releasing 2D games for the American market.

For the game's lead character, Naughty Dog wanted to do what Sega and Warner Bros. did while designing their respective characters – Sonic the Hedgehog and the Tasmanian Devil – and incorporate an existing animal that was appealing and obscure. The team purchased a field guide on Tasmanian mammals and selected the wombat, potoroo, and bandicoot as options. Gavin and Rubin went with "Willy the Wombat" as a temporary name for the starring character of the game. They never intended the name to be final due both to the name sounding "too dorky" and to the existence of a non-video game property of the same name; the name was also used by Hudson Soft for its Japan-exclusive Sega Saturn role-playing game Willy Wombat. The character was effectively a bandicoot by October 1994, but was still referred to as "Willie the Wombat" because a final name had not been formulated yet. Wanting their mascot game to be multi-dimensional in character depth as well as gameplay, Gavin and Rubin chose not to base Crash around one attribute such as "fast" or "cute".

Concept art of Willie the Wombat or Wuzzy Wombat, who would later become Crash Bandicoot. The tail was later removed due to the graphical limitations of the PlayStation.

Epoch Ink artist Joe Pearson and American Exitus artist Charles Zembillas were hired and met with Naughty Dog weekly to design and develop Crash and the other characters of the game. Zembillas' initial sketches of Crash depicted him as a "squat, hunkered-down" character. After Pearson drew a version of Crash that was leaner, had a larger nose and wore a Zorro-like mask, Zembillas began drawing Crash as "a little more manic and insane". Naughty Dog decided early on that there would be no connection between a real animal and Crash's final design, which would instead be determined "51% by technical and visual necessity and 49% by inspiration". Gavin determined Crash's fur color by creating a list of popular characters and their colors, and then making a list of earthly background possibilities (such as forests, deserts, beaches, etc.). Colors that would not look good on the screen were strictly outlawed, such as red, which would bleed on older televisions. Orange was selected by process of elimination. Crash's head was made large and neckless to counter the low resolution of the screen and allow his facial expressions to be discernible. Jason Rubin noted the increased difficulty in turning Crash's head with this type of design. Small details such as the gloves, the spots on Crash's back and a light-colored chest were added to help the player determine what side of Crash was visible based on color. Crash was not given a tail or any flappy straps of clothing due to the PlayStation's inability to properly display such pixels without flickering. The length of Crash's pants was shortened to keep his ankles from flickering as they would with longer pants. Andy Gavin owns the original ink sketches of Crash by Charles Zembillas. Crash was originally written by Pearson as a speaking character who, as a result of his subjection to the Cortex Vortex, communicated in a series of bizarre non sequiturs derived from classic literature and pop culture. The team ultimately decided that Crash would be silent because they considered past voices for video game characters to be "lame, negative, and distract[ing] from identification with them".

Crash's final game model was made from 512 polygons with the only textures being for the spots on his back and his shoelaces. It took Andy Gavin a month to settle on that number of polygons. Because of the game's use of vertex animation, Crash was capable of more facial expressions than other video game characters at or before the time. Crash's jumping, spinning and bonking mechanisms were refined as the Naughty Dog team developed the levels "Heavy Machinery" and "Generator Room". While preparing for the game's demonstration at E3 1996, the team decided to finally rename the title character "Crash Bandicoot", a name credited to Kurosaki and Dave Baggett. The character's name was based on his species and the visceral reaction to his destruction of boxes. The names "Dash", "Smash", and "Bash" were also considered. The marketing director of Universal Interactive Studios insisted that the game and character be named "Wez/Wezzy/Wuzzle the Wombat" or "Ozzie the Otzel". The name Crash Bandicoot prevailed after Naughty Dog threatened to leave the production.

After Naughty Dog presented Crash Bandicoot to Sony's Japanese division, the executives of Sony Computer Entertainment Japan stated their dislike of the character and were unimpressed by the renderings of the character made specifically for the meeting. During a break following the initial meeting, Andy Gavin approached Charlotte Francis, the artist responsible for the renderings, and gave her fifteen minutes to close Crash's huge, smiling mouth to make him seem less aggressive, change his eyes from green to "two small black "Pac-Man" shapes" and make his spike of hair smaller. Sony Japan bought Crash Bandicoot for Japanese distribution after being shown the modified printout. The Japanese television advertising campaign for Crash Bandicoot included a dance performed by a costumed Crash Bandicoot mascot; the dance was created by Sony Japan's marketing manager Megumi Hosoya. The success of the campaign influenced Naughty Dog to incorporate the dance into the games. In 1997, Sony Computer Entertainment America signed a deal making Crash a licensed character with the expectation of making it their third and new mascot.

=== Post Naughty Dog designs ===
Crash's redesign for Crash of the Titans drew mixed reactions from professional video game critics.

Crash served as a mascot for Sony Computer Entertainment from his creation until September 2000 when Universal Interactive Studios and Konami entered an agreement that would enable Konami to publish a Crash Bandicoot game (which would later become Crash Bandicoot: The Wrath of Cortex) for next-generation game systems, with Universal Interactive handling the production of the games; the agreement served to break the Crash Bandicoot franchise's exclusivity to Sony-produced consoles and effectively made Crash Bandicoot a mascot character for Universal rather than Sony. Crash's game model in Crash Bandicoot: The Wrath of Cortex was composed of approximately 1,800 polygons, which allowed an increase in detail compared to past models, including a more complex and realistic tuft of hair, a visible uvula, stitching on his jeans and shoes and a designer label on his pants.

Upon beginning development of Crash Nitro Kart, Vicarious Visions chief executive officer and chief creative officer Karthik Bala noted that Crash's physical appearance had been inconsistent since his debut in 1996 and decided to "explore the original vision of the character" in an attempt to bring him back to his roots. Charles Zembillas and Joe Pearson were tracked down and enlisted for guidance during development of the game and were faced with the challenge of evolving the character and the franchise visually while retaining their "cartoon-like charm". To redesign Crash and the other mainstay characters of the series for Crash Nitro Kart, the Vicarious Visions team reviewed a number of original development sketches from Zembillas's archives and then redesigned the main characters by incorporating details from the concept art and adding girth to the characters; Crash's appearance in the game, compared to the previous two games, sports a slightly larger nose, fuller eyebrows, and a far more textured body. Zembillas noted that "Crash is slimmer and more appealing now. There's also more emphasis on his eyes, and you can see the craftiness in his personality. That's Crash to me, and he's alive again in Nitro Kart". Crash and the rest of the series' cast were redesigned for Crash of the Titans to realign the characters into a unified style as well as make them more modern and distinct from other cartoon characters; the new designs were described by producer Kirsten Forbes as having a "punk" edge to them.

For Crash Bandicoot 4: It's About Time, the development team set updating Crash's design for the game as their earliest task, which prompted conversation within the art team attempting to determine Crash's personality. They eventually honed in on what art director Josh Nadelberg described as "this dude who's always in the wrong place at the wrong time" who "just manages to get himself out of all these crazy situations in a heroic way, but he's not your classic hero". The team's concept artists created various designs for Crash, with Kole being tasked with combining the most suitable elements from each iteration. Artist Nicholas Kole did not find photographic references to real bandicoots helpful in the design process, as his attempts to incorporate them resulted in a deviation from the character's spirit; Kole likened Crash's general design to an artist's attempt at drawing a bandicoot from memory a couple years after having seen one. Artist Ryan Jones took the liberty of omitting Crash's flesh-colored lips in favor of a simpler two-toned fur treatment, which was incorporated into his final design. Crash's lack of a neck was the most difficult aspect of his design for the development team's modelers to translate; as Kole observed: "He's just shoulders and then a head. It was actually kind of a big technical challenge to pull that off just right."

=== Voice portrayal ===
Crash Bandicoot was originally voiced by Brendan O'Brien from 1996 to 2001; O'Brien came in contact with Rubin through Pearson and recorded his dialogue below the Universal Studios Lot's Hitchcock Theater. The character was later voiced by Chip Chinery in Crash Team Racing and Steve Blum in Crash Nitro Kart. Jess Harnell voiced the character for fifteen years from 2005 to 2020, beginning with Crash Tag Team Racing to Crash Bandicoot: On the Run!. In 2020, Scott Whyte voiced the character in Crash Bandicoot 4: It's About Time. Carlos Alazraqui provided his voice in promotional trailers for Cortex Strikes Back, also switching out live performances as him with Tom Kenny at E3 1997.

In the Japanese versions of the games, he was voiced by Kappei Yamaguchi up until the release of Nitro Kart, and by Makoto Ishii in Crash Boom Bang!. In Skylanders Academy, he is voiced by Eric Rogers and later by Rhys Darby.

== Characteristics ==
Crash was genetically engineered through the use of Cortex and Doctor Nitrus Brio's Evolvo-Ray. Before escaping from Doctor Neo Cortex's island fortress, Crash became romantically attached to a female bandicoot named Tawna, who was another one of Cortex's experiments. Crash's separation from Tawna at the hands of Cortex serves as the primary root of Crash's antagonism of Cortex. Crash is a very emotional character who is quick to laugh and quick to cry. While he has a danger-loving, fearless nature and loves a good fight, he prefers relaxing in the sun and rarely seeks out trouble deliberately. To the ire of his friend Crunch, but the amusement of his sister Coco, Crash is prone to impolite personal habits such as belching or scratching his posterior.

Crash is generally depicted as a silent character, with the frequent exception of exclaiming "Whoa!" upon losing a life. In the Radical Entertainment games, Crash speaks in unintelligible gibberish, but gives a verbal exclamation of excitement in the ending sequence of Crash of the Titans. In the Skylanders Academy web series, he speaks in full sentences with an Australian accent and frequently uses slang. Crash narrates the epilogue of Crash Bandicoot 4: It's About Time in a fully articulate voice that Dalton Cooper of Game Rant described as "Morgan Freeman-esque".

In the beginning of the series, Crash's sole offensive maneuvers were jumping onto his enemies and a distinctive technique in which he spins around like a tornado, kicking away anyone or anything that he strikes. In later games Crash can expand his range of abilities by defeating boss characters. The expanded abilities include a powerful splash, the ability to jump while in the air, the "Death Tornado Spin" (a variation of his spinning technique that allows him to hover through the air for a limited time), a bazooka that fires Wumpa Fruit, increased running speed, the ability to safely tip-toe on top of explosive crates, and the ability to jump at incredibly high heights. The games Crash of the Titans and Crash: Mind over Mutant allow Crash to further expand his offensive abilities with new fighting moves learned from collecting a magical substance known as "Mojo". In Skylanders: Imaginators, Crash has the ability to throw TNT crates, and can use his Yo-yo to bring in enemies to spin attack.

== Appearances ==
=== Main series ===
Crash Bandicoot (1996) depicts Crash's origin as an ordinary eastern barred bandicoot who was snatched from the wild by Doctor Neo Cortex and subjected to the Evolvo-Ray as part of Cortex's plan to make Crash the general of his "Cortex Commandos", which would be used to dominate the world. However, he is later deemed unworthy of being in Cortex's army and escapes from Cortex's castle. As an act of revenge and to rescue a female bandicoot named Tawna, Crash travels through the Wumpa Islands, defeating Cortex's henchmen along the way. He eventually defeats Cortex, steals his airship, and escapes alongside Tawna. A year later in Crash Bandicoot 2: Cortex Strikes Back (1997), Crash is recruited by a supposedly reformed Cortex to gather crystals that will ostensibly avert a catastrophe. In Crash Bandicoot: Warped (1998), Crash and his sister Coco thwart a plot by Cortex that spans several time periods.

In Crash Bandicoot: The Wrath of Cortex (2001), Crash and Coco collect crystals to defeat a genetically engineered super-soldier created by Cortex and powered by four ancient and destructive masks. Crash Twinsanity (2004) sees Crash and Cortex being forced to team up to save the world from a pair known as the Evil Twins. Crash of the Titans (2007) and Crash: Mind over Mutant (2008) showcase a redesigned Crash in a beat 'em up style of gameplay as well as his new ability to control (or "jack") large beasts known as Titans. Crash Bandicoot 4: It's About Time (2020), which returns to the original trilogy's gameplay style and narratively follows Crash Bandicoot: Warped, shows Crash and Coco seeking out four Quantum Masks to save the multiverse.

=== Other games ===
Crash appears as a playable character in the racing titles Crash Team Racing (1999), Crash Nitro Kart (2003) and Crash Tag Team Racing (2005), as well as the party titles Crash Bash (2000), Crash Boom Bang! (2006) and Crash Team Rumble (2023). Crash first appeared on a handheld console in Crash Bandicoot: The Huge Adventure (2002) for the Game Boy Advance, which was followed the next year by Crash Bandicoot 2: N-Tranced (2003). Other handheld games featuring Crash include the crossover titles Crash Bandicoot Purple and Spyro Orange (2004) and the Nintendo DS versions of Crash of the Titans (2007) and Crash: Mind over Mutant (2008).

=== Appearances outside of the series ===
Crash makes an appearance in Uncharted 4: A Thief's End (2016) in a playable recreation of a level from Crash Bandicoot. Additionally, Crash appears in Skylanders: Imaginators (2016) alongside Doctor Neo Cortex as a playable Skylander. Crash also makes recurring appearances in Skylanders Academy (2016–18), being transported from his own world into the world of Skylands. Unlike any of his other appearances, he speaks fluent English with an Australian accent, provided by showrunner Eric Rogers in the first season and by Rhys Darby in the third season. Crash, Coco, Aku Aku, Cortex, and Kapuna-Wa appear in the PlayStation 4 "It's time to play" commercial alongside other gaming characters. Crash and Aku Aku make a cameo appearance in Astro's Playroom (2020) and its sequel Astro Bot (2024).

== Cultural impact ==
=== Merchandise ===
Crash has been featured in two series of Crash Bandicoot action figures produced by the now-defunct Resaurus. For Crash Bandicoot 2: Cortex Strikes Back, Resaurus produced a "Jetboard Crash" (a Crash Bandicoot figure bundled with the jetboard seen in the game) and a "Jet Pack Crash" (a goggle-wearing Crash Bandicoot figure bundled with the jet pack seen in the game). The Crash Bandicoot: Warped series featured three different figures of Crash, including one bundled with Aku Aku and Coco Bandicoot figures. A Crash figurine was released as part of the Skylanders: Imaginators starter pack for PlayStation 3 and PlayStation 4 in October 2016; he was made to be playable across all platforms. To promote the series comeback, various shirts, keychains, and other types of merchandise was officially licensed from Activision with Numskull Product Design.

=== Paleontology ===
Paleontologists have named an extinct bandicoot from the Miocene of Australia after the character, Crash bandicoot. Although somewhat unusual for the scientific community, the name was used in an entirely unaltered form, without attempting to return to Latin or Greek roots.

=== Reception ===
As a mascot character, Crash has drawn numerous comparisons to competing mascots such as Mario and Sonic by reviewers. Dave Halverson of GameFan praised Crash's animations, appearance and mannerisms as "100% perfection". A reviewer for GameRevolution praised Crash's "quirky mannerisms" as "always refreshing", and John Broady of GameSpot described Crash as "disarmingly cute and fuzzy". Doug Perry of IGN was critical of the character, seeing him as "insanely capitalistic", negatively comparing his voice to Luigi of the Mario series and accusing him of being "the most see-through, copycat mascot that ever existed." Louis Bedigian of GameZone also disliked Crash's voice, remarking "it is really annoying to hear a child say, 'Whoa!' every time you fall in the water, especially when you realize that the child's voice is supposed to be Crash". Crash's animations, particularly in Crash Bandicoot: The Wrath of Cortex, have been praised as humorous by reviewers. Ryan Davis of GameSpot analyzed Crash's "overextended running style and self-punishing attacks" as establishing him as an "empty-headed but enthusiastic character", and compared his facial contortions to those of comedian Red Skelton.

Crash's aesthetic design in the games developed by Radical Entertainment has received mixed reactions from reviewers. Ravi Sinha of GamingBolt considered the design among the worst in video games, noting that the developers should not have tried "to make Crash look 'cool'". Brian Rowe of GameRevolution noted that Crash's fingerless gloves have been replaced with "equally outdated" tribal tattoos and that Crash's personality had been altered from his "obnoxiously extreme attitude" to that of a "bluthering, googly-eyed idiot". Although Rowe wondered when and why the change happened, he concluded that "it's better than the popular goatee-of-rage that so many other platform giants are sporting these days". Arnold Katayev of PSX Extreme, while admitting that the character detail on Crash was "pretty nice", expressed unhappiness with the artistic choices made for the character; he described Crash's tribal tattoos as "a little pretentious" and noted that the increased definition on his mohawk patch made Crash come off as "trying too hard to be cool". He added that Crash's new fighting style begot a stance that consists of Crash "putting up his dukes like a boxer", which he deemed "out of character" for Crash. Finally, while critiquing the voice acting in Crash of the Titans, he remarked that Crash "especially sounds awful, largely because he doesn't actually speak - he just blabs annoying gibberish, which makes him sound like he's an infant". Matt Keller of PALGN also criticized Crash's voice, which he said made Crash sound "like a confused baby". Louis Bedigian of GameZone stated that "Crash's character design has gone from cool to goofy and now to the dreaded place of being dorky" and said that the minute and gradual changes made to Crash's design throughout the series "have really hurt Crash's appearance as a leading game character". GamePro named Crash's new design as the second worst video game character makeover ever. Craig Harris of IGN was more positive on Crash's new appearance and noted that Crash "looks a little floofier and a lot edgier, gaining a spikier Mohawk and trading in his fingerless gloves for tribal ink all up and down his arms" while comparing his incoherent squawking vocalizations to Kazooie of the Banjo-Kazooie series. He concluded that "ultimately he's been changed for the better. He looks a little cooler and more appealing than his more 'Japanese-inspired' edits over the years".

Crash has been identified by gaming publications as one of the best and most iconic video game characters. In 2024, a poll conducted by BAFTA with around 4,000 respondents named Crash Bandicoot as the fifteenth most iconic video-game character of all time. However, he was also included on IGN's 2009 list of top video game characters who should be retired; IGN editor Colin Moriarty, describing such an event to be a "mercy killing", stated that his games add little to innovate the series over the years, rendering the character useless. In 2017, the character's signature "whoa!" exclamation inspired internet memes incorporating his yelp into songs and video game music.
