= Crash: Mind over Mutant =

2008 video game

- Box art depicting the game's protagonist, Crash Bandicoot, fighting off (clockwise from right) a Yuktopus, a Snipe and a Sludge.
- Developer: Radical Entertainment (Note: Ported to PlayStation Portable by Virtuos.)
- Publishers: NA: Activision; PAL: Vivendi Games (Note: Released under the Sierra Entertainment brand.)
- Director: Josh Esquibel
- Producer: Mike Schneider
- Designer: Joe McGinn
- Programmers: Ryan Ridout; Ian Gipson
- Artist: Yousuf Mapara
- Writer: Christopher Mitchell
- Composer: Marc Baril
- Series: Crash Bandicoot
- Platforms: PlayStation 2 PlayStation Portable; Wii; Xbox 360
- Release: NA: October 7, 2008; AU: October 30, 2008; EU: October 31, 2008
- Genres: Platform, beat 'em up
- Modes: Single-player, multiplayer

Crash: Mind over Mutant is a 2008 platform game developed by Radical Entertainment for the PlayStation 2, PlayStation Portable (ported by Virtuos), Wii and Xbox 360. It was released in North America on October 7, 2008, and was later released in Europe and Australia on October 30 and October 31, respectively. A separate version for the Nintendo DS was developed by Tose. It is the second game in the series not to have a Japanese release (after Crash of the Titans), the first to be published by Activision following its merging with the series' previous publisher Vivendi Games, and the last major console entry as a whole until 2017's Crash Bandicoot N. Sane Trilogy — a remaster of the first three Crash games.

Crash: Mind over Mutant is the fifteenth installment in the Crash Bandicoot video game series, and the seventh in the main franchise. The game's story centers on the arrival of a popular technological device (a parody of devices such as the iPhone and BlackBerry) that puts whoever uses it under the control of the device's creators, Doctor Neo Cortex and Doctor Nitrus Brio. Crash Bandicoot – protagonist of the series and only one unaffected by the device besides his spirit ally Aku Aku – must free his friends from the control of the device and put an end to Cortex and Brio's plot.

The title was met with generally mixed reviews, with opinions varying amongst its different versions. The PlayStation 2 and Wii versions saw generally favorable responses, while the Xbox 360 version generated a less positive reaction. Much praise was aimed towards the voice acting and the satirical humor of the game's narrative, cutscenes and dialogue, while the unadjustable camera and extensive backtracking were criticised.

== Gameplay ==
Mind over Mutant is a beat-'em-up game in which the player controls Crash Bandicoot, whose main objective is to explore his home, Wumpa Island, and surrounding environments to uncover the mystery behind the "NV", a personal digital assistant created by the main antagonist. Crash: Mind over Mutant is a mission-based game as opposed to Crash of the Titans's level-based structure, with goals being given by non-playable characters. Characters with exclamation points (!) over their heads, when talked to, give out important information that is needed to continue the story.

Scattered throughout the world are special items that empower Crash in one way or another. Golden stopwatches trigger a time-limited minigame which usually involves collecting objects or breaking things to earn bonuses. Red running shoes serve to temporarily power up Crash's kick attack and cause him to move faster, while the "Quad Damage" power-up can be used by Crash to temporarily multiply his attack power by four.

=== Combat ===
Crash Bandicoot using a jacked Grimly to fend off two Znus

Crash can perform both a light and heavy-powered attack. He can also block, dodge-and-counter, or break an enemy's block. When he defeats enemies or destroys objects, a magical substance known as Mojo is released that, when collected, allows Crash's abilities to be upgraded.

While small minions require only a single combo attack for Crash to defeat, larger enemies, known as "Titans", require more effort to subdue. Each of the unique Titans in the game possess a star meter that indicates how close they are to being stunned. When the meter is full, the Titan is susceptible to "jacking", meaning Crash can mount the creature and control it. While controlled by the player, the Titan possesses a similar moveset to Crash, although some jacked Titans can shoot projectiles. Besides having more health, the Titans controlled by Crash have a purple Titan Meter which, when full, allows the Titan to unleash a powerful special attack. This fully drains the meter in the process.

A feature new to the series involves Crash storing a Titan in his pocket and utilizing it when it is most advantageous. When Crash is riding a Titan, any Mojo collected goes to the Titan. If enough is collected, the Titan's abilities are upgraded rather than Crash's.

=== Co-operative play ===
A player using a second controller can join in the game at any time. The second player will initially appear as a mask floating around Crash. The mask can attack enemies by using magic projectiles. By pressing a certain button, the second player's character can exit and enter the mask. In the Wii and Xbox 360 versions of the game, Crash's sister, Coco Bandicoot, fills in the role of the second player, while a white-furred version of Crash known as "Carbon Crash" takes on this role in the PlayStation 2 version. Coco is not available for play until she is defeated in a boss fight, after which she is fully playable (though the player can choose to continue with Carbon Crash). This method of play is useful for overpowering enemies and collecting Mojo faster.

== Plot ==
=== Setting ===
The game is played in a free-roaming format rarely seen in previous games. The opening events of the game take place on Wumpa Island. Crash's house is accessible here, and can be used by the player to access skins, concept art, enemy bios and cutscenes. Surrounding environments consist of societies inhabited by friendly Titans, including the Ratcicle Kingdom, the Rhinoroller Desert and the Sludge Junkyard. Other areas include the Evil Public School, attended by the main antagonist's niece, and Mount Grimly, where the evil mask Uka Uka is held. The final events of the game take place in the Space Head, a space station recycled from junkyard parts that is operated by Doctor Neo Cortex.

=== Characters ===
Nine returning characters from previous Crash titles star in the home console version of Crash: Mind over Mutant. The protagonist of the game, Crash Bandicoot, is a bandicoot who must defeat the main antagonist Doctor Cortex and free the Titans from the control of Cortex's new device. Aiding Crash is Aku Aku, an ancient wooden mask who can take control of Titans by entering their heads. Crash's genius sister, Coco Bandicoot, appears initially as a boss character under the control of Cortex's and Brio's handheld device. Afterward, she acts as a playable character during the co-operative mode of the Wii and Xbox 360 console versions; she is replaced by a white-furred version of Crash named "Carbon Crash" in the PlayStation 2 version. Crunch Bandicoot, Crash's muscular cyborg friend, also appears in the game as a brainwashed boss.

The main antagonist of the series, Doctor Neo Cortex, is a mad scientist who plans on taking control of the denizens of the Wumpa Islands by marketing a mind-controlling mobile phone, the "NV", to them. Doctor Nitrus Brio makes a return appearance as Cortex's partner, aiding him in the development of the NV. Uka Uka, Aku Aku's evil twin brother, is the source of the bad Mojo necessary to take control of those using the NV device. Nina Cortex, Neo Cortex's niece, also appears in the game, having been transferred to an evil public school by her uncle. Doctor N. Gin, Cortex's demented right-hand man, makes a relatively minor appearance as a boss character early in the game.

A number of small fodder enemies attempt to hinder Crash in his journey, much of them appearing in the previous Crash of the Titans. The Ratnicians, who previously worked for Doctor Neo Cortex, have since gone feral and vegetarian, and now work for the minor antagonist Doctor N. Gin. The Brat Girls, who previously worked for Nina Cortex, have betrayed her and now run the Evil Public School and supervise the Ratcicles in the Ratcicle Kingdom. The Doom Monkeys make a return appearance as employees of Nitrus Brio in the Sludge Junkyard. Two new fodder enemies make their debut in the game: the Znu, a group of small, warty creatures that inhabit Mount Grimly, and the Slap-E's, hand-shaped robots that share Doctor Cortex's memories and personal problems.

=== Story ===
The individual cutscenes of Crash: Mind over Mutant are drawn in differing artistic styles. Some examples of these styles (as shown above) include hand puppetry, American comics, South Park and Dragon Ball

Social satire and the theme of consumerism are frequent sources of humor in the plot of Crash: Mind over Mutant, with the game featuring jokes about SUVs and the skyrocketing prices of gas at the time. The game's story is told through a number of cut scenes animated in 2D Animation with different styles, such as those of Dragon Ball, The Animatrix, and South Park.

Crash: Mind over Mutant takes place a year later after the events of where Crash of the Titans left off. The Titans, free from the control of Doctor Neo Cortex, have spread throughout the Wumpa Islands and cultivated their own societies and towns. All seems well until a rejuvenated Cortex teams up with his old partner Nitrus Brio to invent a personal digital assistant, the "NV", that can control the minds of both mutants and bandicoots by transmitting bad Mojo, forcefully siphoned from Cortex's former boss Uka Uka. Crash and Aku Aku are not affected by the device, meanwhile N. Gin launches an attack on the bandicoots. Crash and Aku Aku defeated him, but they discover their family members Coco and Crunch are soon transformed into monstrous version of themselves who seek Crash's destruction.

After Coco is freed from the NV's control, the Bandicoots learn of Doctor Cortex's plot by accessing his blog, and decide to go to the Evil Public School, where Nina was placed by Doctor Cortex. Nina in return for Crash saving her science fair project, informs the heroes of Cortex's and Brio's alliance and reveals their location in the Junkyard, where N. Brio is recycling parts to create a new space station, the "Space Head", for Cortex and new NV devices.

Crash and Aku Aku find Crunch and N. Brio at the Junkyard and manage to break Crunch free from the NV's control. After learning of Uka Uka's whereabouts from N. Brio, Crash and Aku Aku go to Mount Grimly, where Uka Uka is being drained of all his Mojo. After being freed, Uka Uka informs Crash that his six voodoo bones, his source of power, have been stolen and given to three of the worst Titans on the Island, and tells them to go and retrieve the bones for him. When the bones have been gathered, Uka Uka uses his restored power to send Crash to the Space Head and Crash can enact Uka Uka's vengeance on Cortex. Crash engages in a fight against Cortex, who uses a mutation formula stolen from Brio to empower himself for the battle. Upon losing to the Bandicoot, Cortex throws a tantrum, causing the Space Head to fall towards the Earth. Cortex, having returned to normal, makes his escape from the plummeting Space Head, while Crash and Aku Aku brace themselves for a crash-landing on Wumpa Island. Crash and Aku Aku manage to survive the crash and reunite with Coco and Crunch as parts of the Space Head rain down from the sky. Coco ends the story by telling Aku Aku that they're not going to help clean up, much to his chagrin.

== Development and release ==
Development on Crash: Mind over Mutant began immediately after the completion of Crash of the Titans. The idea of preserving a titan for later use came from the play testing sessions of Crash of the Titans, in which the testers were found to be reluctant to leave the titans behind after an epic battle was won. Fans of the series were also a source of inspiration for Crash: Mind over Mutant, having such wishes as a free-roaming environment, Coco Bandicoot being a playable character and the return of the character Doctor Nitrus Brio. Full camera control was considered for the game, but was rejected for graphical reasons and to avoid having to insert a split-screen view in the cooperation mode. Online gameplay was also considered as a feature in the finished game, but was omitted due to the brief development schedule. Coco Bandicoot as a playable character was omitted from the PlayStation 2 version of the game due to her distinct animations taking up much of the console's memory. The Wii version of Crash: Mind over Mutant was created first, with the graphics scaled up for the Xbox 360, and scaled down for the PlayStation 2. A PlayStation 3 version of the game was rumored, but was promptly debunked by Radical Entertainment as a mistake on many press sites' behalf.

There was an open call for fan art of Crash Bandicoot to be submitted as part of a contest. The contest was hosted by Kidzworld as part of a preview page and was aimed at fans under the age of 18. Selected artwork is included in the final build of the game either inside of a comic book in Crash's house or on a wall in the school attended by Nina Cortex. In addition, winners had their names appear in the game's credits and received a free copy of the game when it was released.

To ensure that the audio did not become repetitive, Crash: Mind over Mutant features more than 8,500 lines of dialogue. The music was composed by Marc Baril, who previously composed Crash Tag Team Racing and Crash of the Titans.

Sierra Entertainment announced Crash: Mind over Mutant on April 28, 2008.

== Reception ==
Reception

Aggregate score
Aggregator	Score
Metacritic	PS2: 73/100; Wii: 70/100; X360: 60/100

Review scores
Publication	Score
Eurogamer	X360: 5/10
Game Informer	X360: 4.75/10
GameRevolution	X360: C
GameSpot	X360: 5.5/10
GamesRadar+	3.5/5
GameZone	PS2: 7/10; Wii: 7.7/10; X360: 8.1/10
IGN	6.9/10
Nintendo World Report	Wii: 6/10
TeamXbox	X360: 5.8/10

The console versions of Crash: Mind over Mutant received "mixed or average" reviews according to Metacritic. Dakota Grabowski of GameZone considered the game "slightly better" than Crash of the Titans, noting improvements in controls, gameplay and storyline from its predecessor, but lamented that "the camera almost ruins the whole package." Louis Bedigian of GameZone stated that the young demographic of the Crash Bandicoot series "may be annoyed by the camera and/or repetitive objectives but will be entertained by what is the best Crash game developed in a long time – and one of the best Mario clones released for Nintendo Wii." Neal Ronaghan of Nintendo World Report, meanwhile, felt that "the charming story and genuine humor" of the game were "overshadowed by the shallow gameplay". Christopher Ewen of GameZone praised the series' transition into a free-roaming gameplay environment, but felt that the game was too easy. Matt Casamassina of IGN found the game to be "exactly like its predecessor: a mildly enjoyable beat 'em up romp that's sure to satisfy younger players, but won't provide much that seasoned players haven't already experienced before". Andy Eddy of TeamXbox noted the uninspired gameplay, which was "not very consistent in its fun generation." Justin Calvert of GameSpot claimed that the game "has too much backtracking and too many camera problems to make it recommendable". Dan Pearson of Eurogamer criticised the game's fixed camera, extensive backtracking, useless mission log and dated concepts. Andrew Reiner of Game Informer proclaimed that the game's "unpredictable framerates, extensive backtracking, and the guarantee of one death caused by faulty camera positioning for every platforming segment" made it "a mess of a game, and a new low point for the once-loved marsupial."

Grabowski and Ewen dismissed the in-game graphics as run-of-the-mill, with Grabowski elaborating that while the animations have improved from Crash of the Titans, the "semi-decent" environments have not. Towell and Casamassina, however, were impressed by the large draw distances, detailed environments, and special effects such as transparent water and reflective ice. The frame rate was said to suffer from slowdown during extensive action and especially on weaker consoles, whereas Towell regarded the frame rate as solid. The cutscenes were singled out for praise for their varied art styles, though Eddy was disconcerted by the abrupt transitions between gameplay and cutscenes. Bedigian regarded the overall visuals as decent, but was critical of Crash's "dorky" design, feeling that the subtle changes that have been made over the years "really hurt Crash’s appearance as a leading game character".

Critics lauded the humorous voice-acting and dialogue, with Towell characterizing the game as a well-done mimicry of Saturday-morning cartoons. However, Casamassina found some of the in-game dialogue annoying and repetitive; the music was similarly described as such by Towell, Bedigian and Grabowski, while Ewen regarded it as "standard Crash fare".
