= Crash Tag Team Racing =

2005 video game

- Developer: Radical Entertainment
- Publisher: Vivendi Universal Games (Note: Released under the Sierra Entertainment brand name)
- Director: Kathy Carter-Humphreys
- Producers: Joel DeYoung; Tim Bennison; Vlad Ceraldi
- Designer: Joe McGinn
- Programmer: Cary Brisebois
- Artist: Darren Woo
- Writer: Chris Mitchell
- Composers: Marc Baril; Spiralmouth; Michael Neilson
- Series: Crash Bandicoot
- Platforms: PlayStation 2; Xbox; GameCube; PlayStation Portable
- Release: PS2, Xbox, GameCube: NA: October 21, 2005; AU: November 3, 2005; EU: November 4, 2005; PlayStation Portable: NA: November 9, 2005; EU: November 25, 2005; AU: December 9, 2005
- Genres: Kart racing; platform
- Modes: Single-player; multiplayer

Crash Tag Team Racing is a 2005 kart racing and platform game developed by Radical Entertainment and published by Vivendi Universal Games (VU Games) for the PlayStation 2 (PS2), Xbox, GameCube, and PlayStation Portable (PSP). A version for the Nintendo DS by Sensory Sweep Studios was cancelled near its completion. It is the third racing game in the Crash Bandicoot video game series, following Crash Nitro Kart (2003). The game's story takes place in a racing-based theme park, in which Crash Bandicoot must recover its missing Power Gems to claim the park's ownership.

Crash Tag Team Racing was the first Crash Bandicoot title developed by Radical Entertainment, which was acquired by VU Games during the game's development; Radical would subsequently develop Crash of the Titans (2007) and Crash: Mind over Mutant (2008). The game received mixed reviews upon release. Praise went to its clashing mechanic, genre-blending approach, visuals, voice acting, and humor, while criticism went to its lack of depth, low difficulty, the execution of its platforming elements, and technical issues on the PSP version. Characters from the game later appeared in Crash Team Racing Nitro-Fueled in 2019.

== Gameplay ==
In Crash Tag Team Racing, two racers can "clash" their vehicles into one (top). The racetracks are linked by platforming segments in the single-player campaign (bottom).

Reviewers in Electronic Gaming Monthly described Crash Tag Team Racing as a hybrid of kart racing game and platformer game. Set in a theme park owned by the cyborg Ebenezer Von Clutch, the game follows Crash Bandicoot and his friends as they compete in races and explore the park to recover a Power Gem from each of the park's five themed areas.

The races feature common kart racing elements such as power-sliding to make tight turns and picking up power-ups from icons on the track to use against other racers. Each car is equipped with booster rockets that can provide a powerful speed burst when filled. The player earns boost power by power-sliding, destroying other cars with weapons, accumulating multiple knock-outs, and shooting trackside targets. During a race, players can "clash" their vehicle with an opponent's by pressing a button, forming a merged vehicle with a turret. Players can choose to drive or control the turret, which fires character-specific weapons (such as Crash's Wumpa Gun and Von Clutch's Radioactive Bomblets). Clashing provides stronger power-ups (such as grand pianos and homing sharks) and boost power, but reduces speed. Disengaging from a clash grants a temporary speed boost.

In the game's single-player campaign, the player controls Crash on foot in a theme park hub, from which he can enter the five areas. Each area includes gates that grant access to race tracks, battle arenas, stunt tracks, and driving minigames. The player earns coins and Power Crystals by playing the minigames, which include Fast Lap (driving for the best lap time), Crashinator (crashing into as many obstacles as possible), Run and Gun (shooting at trackside objects), and Rolling Thunder (shooting at moving cars). Coins can be exchanged for rewards such as new clothing for the characters, while Power Crystals are needed to unlock the location of an area's Power Gem, which in turn unlocks the next area of the park. Coins can also be collected by smashing crates scattered throughout the area, and drinking Wumpa Whip gives the player a temporary coin multiplier that earns extra money from coins and crates. The player can complete NPC side quests to unlock cars, weapon upgrades, clothing, or to play minigames. Aside from the aforementioned collectibles, the player can collect "Die-O-Ramas", small cutscenes depicting Crash's death to the park's hazards. A total of 34 Die-O-Ramas can be collected, and can be viewed from the main menu at any time. The park's areas are inhabited by ninja penguins who attempt to steal Crash's coins.

Crash Tag Team Racing supports local multiplayer via split-screen play or over a local area network. The PSP version supports wireless play for up to eight players. Multiplayer modes include standard races, arenas for last-man-standing combat, Grand Prix race series, and stunt tracks in which players score points via tricks. The PS2 version can connect with the PSP version via a Mini-USB cable, which unlocks two new battle arenas and five unique PSP version cars.

== Plot ==
Von Clutch's MotorWorld, a perilous auto-racing theme park owned by the cyborg Ebenezer Von Clutch, faces closure due to the theft of its Power Gems, including the Black Heart Power Gem that keeps Von Clutch active. To recover them, Von Clutch announces a race across the park's five lands, with the winner gaining ownership of the park. Appearing at the park in the midst of a chaotic car chase are the Bandicoots Crash, Coco, and Crunch, along with their foes Doctor Neo Cortex, his niece Nina, and Doctor N. Gin. Both teams are summoned to Von Clutch's office, where he pleads for their help to recover the stolen Gems. Cortex is initially dismissive, but sees an opportunity to seize the park as a new evil base and agrees to race, plotting to sabotage the Bandicoots. Pasadena O'Possum, a loyal racer for Von Clutch, vows to outrace Cortex, while Willie Wumpa Cheeks, the park's peculiar mascot and producer of the beverage Wumpa Whip, offers cryptic riddles about the Gems' locations.

As Crash recovers the Power Gems, Cortex, frustrated by his team's struggles, suspects someone else is rigging the race, though he continues his own schemes to undermine the Bandicoots. Coco and Pasadena notice a pattern: each Gem's hiding spot is marked by Wumpa Whip. When Coco presents her deduction, the cornered Willie confesses to stealing the Gems, including the Black Heart Power Gem, intending to sabotage Von Clutch and seize control. He flees with the Black Heart Power Gem, prompting a chase to Astro Land, while Von Clutch finally runs out of power and shuts down. Crash thwarts Willie's escape by aborting the launch of his rocket, but before Willie can be made to surrender the Black Heart Power Gem, Cortex's team attacks in a spacecraft, liquefying Willie and preparing to eliminate the Bandicoots. Crash throws a chicken into the ship's rotor, causing it to malfunction, and Cortex vows revenge as he retreats. The Bandicoots are presented the park's deed but choose to return it to Von Clutch, though due to the loss of the Black Heart Power Gem, Pasadena laments that Von Clutch will remain deactivated. Crash accidentally finds the Black Heart Power Gem in Willie's nozzle nose while drinking from it. He revives Von Clutch, who grants the Bandicoots free lifetime passes to the park in gratitude.

== Development and release ==
Crash Tag Team Racing was developed by Radical Entertainment at the time of its acquisition by Vivendi Universal Games (VU Games) on March 23, 2005. VU Games announced the game's development on April 7, with planned fall releases for the PlayStation 2, Xbox, and GameCube by Radical Entertainment, and for the Nintendo DS by Sensory Sweep Studios. The PlayStation Portable version was announced on July 19.

The game was produced by Joel DeYoung, Tim Bennison, and Vlad Ceraldi. Radical Entertainment's Cary Brisebois and VU Games's Kathy Carte-Humphreys were the game's respective technical and creative directors. Darren Woo was the art director, with Željko Duvnjak serving as the conceptual artist. The game was designed by Joe McGinn. Chris Mitchell was the game's writer, with Crash Twinsanity writer Jordan Reichek serving as a creative consultant. The environments of the game were built by Sarah Meagher and Vincent Chin, while the vehicles were built by Kevin Fink.

The soundtrack was composed by Marc Baril and Spiralmouth (the latter reprising their music role from Crash Twinsanity), with Michael Neilson providing additional music; Gabriel Mann of Spiralmouth doubled as the soundtrack's producer. A fifteen-track soundtrack was released on March 6, 2007. The game's voice actors were cast and directed by Chris Borders at Technicolor Interactive Services. Lex Lang and Debi Derryberry reprised their respective roles as Dr. Cortex and Coco, while the roles of Crash, Crunch, N. Gin and Nina were respectively inherited by Jess Harnell, Chris Williams, Nolan North and Amy Gross. The new characters Von Clutch, Pasadena and Willie were respectively voiced by Danny Mann, Shanelle Workman and Roger L. Jackson. The full-motion videos were created by Red Eye Studios, who had previously animated the cutscenes for Crash Nitro Kart and Crash Twinsanity.

VU Games showcased the game at E3 2005 and the 2005 Leipzig Games Convention. The Nintendo DS version was cancelled near its completion due to concerns about competing with the upcoming Mario Kart DS. The console version was shipped in North America on October 21, 2005, in Australia on November 3, and in Europe on November 4. The PSP version was released in North America on November 9, in Europe on November 25, and in Australia on December 9. In 2007, the PlayStation 2 version of Crash Tag Team Racing was re-released in the three-disc Crash Bandicoot Action Pack compilation alongside Crash Nitro Kart and Crash Twinsanity.

== Reception ==
Reception

Aggregate score
Aggregator	Score	
Aggregator	General	PSP
Metacritic	XBOX: 69/100; PS2, NGC: 66/100	68/100

Review scores
Publication	Score	
Publication	General	PSP
Electronic Gaming Monthly	5.5/10, 3/10, 5/10	N/A
Eurogamer	7/10	5/10
GameSpot	7.3/10	7/10
GameSpy	3/5	N/A
GameZone	7.5/10	N/A
IGN	7.4/10	7/10
Jeuxvideo.com	14/20	9/20
Nintendo Power	7/10	N/A
Nintendo World Report	4/10	N/A
PlayStation Official Magazine – UK	6.5/10	N/A
Official Xbox Magazine (UK)	5/10	N/A
PALGN	7/10	6.5/10
TeamXbox	7.4/10	N/A
X-Play	3/5	N/A

Crash Tag Team Racing received "mixed or average" reviews across all platforms according to review aggregator Metacritic. Critics deemed the game best suited for younger players, citing its easy gameplay, colorful presentation, and lack of graphic violence. However, its lack of depth and short single-player campaign were said to limit replayability for older or experienced players, with critics recommending a rental rather than a purchase. Kathleen Sanders of Electronic Gaming Monthly and Karl Castaneda of Nintendo World Report argued that even younger players might find it lacking compared to alternatives such as Mario Kart: Double Dash!! (2003) or Burnout Revenge (2005).

The clashing feature was widely praised as innovative and fun. Michael Knutson of GameZone, Charles Onyett of IGN, and Ellie Gibson of Eurogamer highlighted its uniqueness, with Steve Thomason of Nintendo Power noting it added a strategic layer and differentiated the game from Mario Kart: Double Dash!!. Knutson and Xplay's Justin Speer particularly enjoyed the selection of character-specific weapons. However, clashing was said to oversimplify races, reducing the focus on traditional racing skills like power-sliding or track navigation. Critics noted that staying in clash mode made races too easy, especially on lower difficulties, diminishing the challenge. Castaneda and Eurogamer's Kristan Reed criticized the lack of depth, with Onyett adding that clashing overshadowed racing dynamics and made tracks feel secondary. The lack of a learning curve or need for skillful driving disappointed Gibson and Reed, the latter comparing it unfavorably to Mario Kart DS's depth. The single-player campaign was said to be short, with estimates falling within 5-6 hours.

The integration of platforming and racing was seen as ambitious and adding variety, with Speer and Jeuxvideo.com's Romendil commending the seamless mix and exploration in the amusement park hub. Thomason, GameSpot's Alex Navarro and PALGN's Luke Van Leuveren regarded the platforming segments as a refreshing break from the racing. and Onyett saw the exploration and collection aspects as an entertaining diversion. Reed, Sanders and GameSpy's Hector Guzman argued the platforming felt forced and poorly executed, with clunky camera controls and repetitive fetch-quests. Castaneda called the overworld exploration "ill-conceived", noting it detracted from the racing focus. Official Xbox Magazine perceived a lack of polish in the platforming compared to previous Crash titles.

The colorful, cartoony visuals were well-received for maintaining the Crash Bandicoot aesthetic, with detailed environments and smooth animations during races. Van Leuveren and TeamXbox's Matthew Fisher described the tracks and character designs as vibrant, though not groundbreaking. Onyett and Castaneda found the graphics unremarkable, and occasional frame rate drops were noted, especially in the PSP and GameCube versions. The PSP version was praised by Navarro and Van Leuveren for closely matching the PS2 version's visuals, but was criticized for its choppy performance and excessive loading. Gibson found the environments gloomily-lit in parts.

Reactions to the voice acting were generally positive. Knutson regarded the voice acting as solid, while Onyett found some of the character voices, particularly that of Pasadena O'Possum, to be annoying. Although Navarro found some of the voice acting to be obnoxious, he and Castaneda commended its comedic quality, with Navarro singling out the henchmen and chicken commentators. Matthew Fisher of TeamXbox felt that the voice work was merely passable. The French-language version's dubbing was noted by Romendil to enhance the game's charm. The music and sound effects were largely dismissed as unremarkable, repetitive, and forgettable, with the exception of Gibson, who praised them.

The multiplayer was seen as underdeveloped, with Knutson and Navarro pointing out its limited depth. Speer highlighted the fun of clashing and betraying opponents in multiplayer, but was perplexed by the inability to carry over unlocks from the single-player campaign. The lack of online play across all platforms was a significant drawback. Van Leuveren cited the PSP's support for wireless multiplayer as an advantage over the console versions.

The humor was a strong point, with Thomason appreciating it not becoming excessive. However, Sanders and Jeuxvideo.com's Logan saw the burping and farting functions during load screens as juvenile, with Logan regarding it as disrespectful to Crash's legacy of a broad appeal.

== Legacy ==
Radical Entertainment would develop two more installments in the Crash Bandicoot series, releasing Crash of the Titans in 2007 and Crash: Mind over Mutant in 2008. Ebenezer Von Clutch, Pasadena O'Possum, and the commentators Chick and Stew appeared as playable characters in the 2019 Crash Team Racing remaster Crash Team Racing Nitro-Fueled.
