= Crash Bash =

2000 video game

- Developers: Eurocom Entertainment Software; Cerny Games
- Publisher: Sony Computer Entertainment
- Producers: Jon Williams; Grady Hunt; Vijay Lakshman
- Designers: Mark Cerny; Michael John
- Programmers: Dave Pridmore; Stuart Johnson; Julian Walshaw-Vaughn; Steve Bak; Kris Adcock
- Artists: Matt Dixon; Steve Bamford; Clive Stevenson; Jon Parr
- Composer: Steve Duckworth
- Series: Crash Bandicoot
- Platform: PlayStation
- Release: NA: November 8, 2000; EU: November 29, 2000
- Genre: Party
- Modes: Single-player, multiplayer

Crash Bash is a 2000 party video game developed by Eurocom Entertainment Software in association with Cerny Games and published by Sony Computer Entertainment for the PlayStation. It is the fifth title in the Crash Bandicoot series and the first entry in the series in the party genre. The game includes a collection of 28 mini-games playable within three modes of gameplay, as well as eight playable characters from the Crash Bandicoot series.

Crash Bash is the first game in the series not to be developed by Naughty Dog, as well as the last Crash Bandicoot game to be exclusively released on a Sony console, with subsequent installments being released on a wider variety of platforms. The game received mixed reviews from critics, who widely noted its similarity to Mario Party, but regarded it as an enjoyable multiplayer experience despite a perceived lack of depth and originality. The mini-games were determined to be varied but repetitive, and the graphics were appreciated for replicating the look and feel of previous Crash Bandicoot titles.

== Gameplay ==
An example of a mini-game in Crash Bash, featuring (from left to right) Crash Bandicoot, Doctor Neo Cortex, Koala Kong, and Rilla Roo playing a game in the "Ballistix" category

Crash Bash is a party video game featuring eight playable characters with differing powers and skills: Crash, Coco Bandicoot, Tiny Tiger, Dingodile, Cortex, Doctor Nitrus Brio, Koala Kong, and newcomer Rilla Roo. The gameplay consists of 28 different mini-games divided into seven categories with multiple variations each. The categories consist of: "Ballistix", in which players pilot hovercraft to deflect steel balls away from their goal; "Polar Push", in which players riding polar bear cubs must knock opponents off of an icy arena; "Pogo Pandemonium", in which players navigate a grid on pogo sticks to paint squares with their color; "Crate Crush", in which players throw or kick stone crates at their opponents to deplete their health and eliminate them from play; "Tank Wars", a tank battle involving mines and missiles; "Crash Dash", a multi-lap race on a circular track; and "Medieval Mayhem", a variety of challenges played within a circular arena. Crash Bash includes multiplayer compatibility for up to four human players with the use of the PlayStation Multitap.

Crash Bash features three distinct modes of play: "Adventure", "Battle" and "Tournament". In the Adventure mode, one or two human players must win all 28 mini-games and retrieve trophies, gems and crystals by accomplishing certain challenges presented for each mini-game. The mini-games are accessed from a series of "Warp Room" hub areas, with the first Warp Room consisting of four mini-games. A trophy is won by achieving victory in three rounds of any given mini-game. After obtaining a trophy, the player(s) can return to the mini-game and receive a gem or crystal by winning one round under special conditions. When a minimum number of trophies, gems and crystals have been won, the Warp Room's "Boss Arena" becomes accessible, in which the player(s) must defeat a boss character by depleting his health. Winning a Warp Room's Boss Arena will grant entry to the next Warp Room. When three of the game's four Boss Arenas have been won, mini-game challenges become available in which the player(s) can win gold or platinum Relics by defeating advanced computer-controlled opponents. The Adventure mode is completed when all trophies, gems, crystals and relics have been won.

The Battle mode is a quick match within any mini-game that has previously been won in the Adventure mode. The mini-games within this mode can be played as a free-for-all or in teams. In the Tournament mode, players compete in four consecutive mini-games and accumulate points; the player with the most points wins the tournament. In both the Battle and Tournament modes, the number of rounds needed to win a mini-game can be adjusted between two and seven, and the skill level of computer-controlled opponents can be adjusted between "easy", "medium" and "hard".

== Plot ==
The Adventure campaign features a story centering on Aku Aku and Uka Uka, who seek to resolve their feud via a contest between teams who battle in their stead, as the brothers are forbidden from fighting each other directly. During the course of the campaign, Uka Uka plots to use the crystals obtained by the player, a scheme which Aku Aku becomes wise to. The ending is determined by the player's choice of character. If the player chose a character from Aku Aku's team, Aku Aku locks the crystals away and banishes Uka Uka into the vacuum of space, but if the player chose a character from Uka Uka's team, Uka Uka wields the crystals' destructive power to his own ends. If two players complete the campaign with a character from each team, the characters are subject to a special tie-breaking game to decide which team prevails.

== Development and release ==
Following the release of Crash Team Racing in 1999, Crash Bandicoot creator Naughty Dog began development on Jak and Daxter: The Precursor Legacy for the PlayStation 2, and were soon acquired by Sony Computer Entertainment, with Universal Interactive retaining control of the Crash Bandicoot intellectual property. As Naughty Dog's deal with Universal expired, Universal president Mark Cerny departed the studio and formed the independent consultancy Cerny Games to continue his relationship with Naughty Dog and Sony.

Universal's first Crash Bandicoot game without Naughty Dog's involvement would be the Eurocom-developed Crash Bash, with Cerny and Michael John of Cerny Games acting as designers. Naughty Dog, however, donated its entire Crash Bandicoot-related art database for the game's development. Eurocom's Jon Williams, Sony's Grady Hunt, and Universal's Vijay Lakshman served as producers. The programming team consisted of Dave Pridmore, Stuart Johnson, Julian Walshaw-Vaughn, Steve Bak, and Kris Adcock. The graphics were created by Matt Dixon, Steve Bamford, Clive Stevenson, and Jon Parr, while the audio was created by Steve Duckworth. Universal's Sean Krankel and Ricci Rukavina provided additional mini-game design. The character Rilla Roo was created due to the lack of suitable player characters from the Naughty Dog games. Dixon credited the character's concept to Cerny and the design to lead character artist Bamford. The game was showcased at E3 2000, and shipped to North American retailers on November 8, 2000, with a European release following on November 29. It is the final Crash Bandicoot game to be released exclusively for a Sony console, with subsequent installments being released on the Xbox and PlayStation 2.

A game demo of Spyro: Year of the Dragon is accessible via a cheat code entered at the title screen. While a game demo of Crash Bash is, in turn, accessible from Spyro: Year of the Dragon's title screen, an alternate input entered at the demo's title screen unlocks a debug menu, granting access to a near-complete beta copy of the game. While all the game's levels are available, the Adventure mode's final hub area is missing, necessitating use of a GameShark to access its levels. The Japanese version of the game features Fake Crash – an odd doppelganger of Crash who had made cameos in previous Crash Bandicoot games – as an unlockable character.

== Reception ==
Reception

Aggregate score
Aggregator	Score
Metacritic	68/100

Review scores
Publication	Score
Electronic Gaming Monthly	5/10, 6/10, 7/10
Game Informer	6.5/10
GamePro	15/20
GameRevolution	B
GameSpot	6/10
IGN	7.5/10
Next Generation	3/5

Crash Bash received "mixed or average" reviews, according to review aggregator Metacritic. Reviewers widely compared the game to Mario Party and the then-upcoming Sonic Shuffle. While perceiving a lack of depth and originality, they nevertheless regarded the multiplayer experience as enjoyable.

Shawn Sparks of GameRevolution commended the variety of mini-games, but was displeased by the requirement of playing through the Adventure mode to unlock mini-games in the multiplayer modes. Matt Helgeson of Game Informer admired the challenge and innovative concepts provided by the mini-games, but felt that the Adventure mode was monotonous and lacked purpose. Greg Sewart of Electronic Gaming Monthly interpreted Eurocom's eschewing of the board game formula established by Mario Party in favor of a more action-based format as an attempt to not appear completely derivative, which he deemed unsuccessful. He also complained of the lack of diversity in the Tournament mode, which grouped together mini-games of the same basic type, and felt that it made the mini-game completion requirement of one of the players winning at least three rounds especially tedious. Dean Hager, also of Electronic Gaming Monthly, felt that some of the mini-games were forced and awkward to control, and observed that an excessive amount of power-ups and "general chaos" made concentration difficult. Out of the mini-games, Sewart and Hager deemed those in the "Ballistix" category to be the most fun. Although Doug Perry of IGN appreciated the different variations of the mini-games, he and Daniel Erickson of Next Generation found them generally repetitive. Ryan Davis of GameSpot dismissed Crash Bash as "utterly run of the mill, completely middle of the road", and criticized the unbalanced AI.

The graphics were appreciated for replicating the look and feel of the Naughty Dog titles, but Helgeson and Human Tornado of GamePro were troubled by the distant camera, with the latter observing that the characters often bunched together in several games. While Davis admired the game's explosion, particle and lighting effects, he was annoyed by their abundance distracting from the gameplay and sporadically causing slowdown.

Perry summarized the music as "kooky and light and it's fun to listen to" and remarked on its resemblance to the Naughty Dog games, elaborating that "the thumping vibes and bubblegum Congo drumbeats are right on target". Davis determined the audio to be "standard, with Hanna-Barbera-style background music that is appropriate to the various environments and a somewhat limited set of taunts and yelps for each character", and warned that the audio may quickly wear thin.

According to the NPD Group, Crash Bash was the 16th highest selling console game of December 2000 in North America, as well as the 7th best-selling PlayStation title. In the United Kingdom, the game received a "Platinum" sales award from the Entertainment and Leisure Software Publishers Association (ELSPA), indicating sales of at least 300,000 copies.
