= Crash of the Titans (Nintendo DS video game) =

2007 video game

- North American box art
- Developer: Griptonite Games
- Publisher: Vivendi Games (Note: Released under the Sierra Entertainment brand name)
- Directors: Phil Trumbo; Kathy Carter-Humphreys
- Producers: Mike Platteter; Joe Selinske
- Designers: Shawn Truesdell; Darrin Michelson; Kami Neumiller
- Programmers: Philippe Paquet; Eli Ford; Marc Hall
- Artist: Kevin Chung
- Composer: Nathaniel Papadakis
- Series: Crash Bandicoot
- Platform: Nintendo DS
- Release: NA: October 2, 2007; EU: October 19, 2007; AU: October 25, 2007
- Genres: Platform, beat 'em up
- Mode: Single-player

Crash of the Titans is a 2007 platform video game developed by Griptonite Games and published by Vivendi Games for the Nintendo DS. It is an installment in the Crash Bandicoot series and an alternate version of the console-based title of the same name developed by Radical Entertainment.

Like the console version, the game centers on the titular character Crash Bandicoot, who must use combat moves to subdue and take control of large creatures called "Titans" that are being created by Crash's arch-nemesis Doctor Neo Cortex. While the game's two versions share an emphasis on the mechanic of "jacking" Titans, the Nintendo DS version differs in its plot and extensive use of the touchscreen and microphone.

The game received mixed reviews from critics, who praised the gameplay variety and visuals, but criticized the combat, touchscreen controls and juvenile tone.

== Gameplay ==
An example of gameplay in Crash of the Titans, in which Crash has jacked a Titan with a rolling ability

The Nintendo DS version of Crash of the Titans is a platform game with beat 'em up elements. The player controls Crash Bandicoot, who must stop his arch-nemesis Doctor Neo Cortex's plot to mutate and control the Wumpa Islands' population. The game takes place on four islands, each consisting of two levels and a boss. When a boss is defeated, a new island is unlocked, and the player can travel between islands by drawing a path on the touchscreen.

The gameplay takes place from a third-person perspective. Crash is capable of moving in eight directions and is equipped with a series of offensive maneuvers for attacking enemies. He can also use his ally, the floating mask Aku Aku, as a shield against enemy attacks or as a blunt weapon. Larger enemies, known as "Titans", have a stamina meter, which can be depleted if Crash attacks them. This leaves the Titan stunned and susceptible to being "jacked" by Crash; using the touchscreen, the player can flick Aku Aku's icon toward the Titan and take control of it, allowing Crash to use its powers. Each Titan is capable of a special attack that can be activated by using the touchscreen or microphone. While on a jacked Titan, Crash can jack onto another Titan that has been stunned. Throughout the game, small orbs of magic known as "Mojo" can be collected by defeating enemies, chaining jacks, and destroying crates. Collecting Mojo allows Crash to upgrade his abilities by visiting a kiosk located in each level. Bonus Mojo can be obtained if the Game Boy Advance version of Crash of the Titans is inserted prior to turning on the Nintendo DS.

Each island has its own pachinko board where players can win items with several effects, such as restoring health, providing temporary invincibility, and setting off explosions. Additional content can also be won at these pachinko boards, such as gallery art, cheats, and a jackpot of Mojo. In any given level, the player can obtain a Gem by collecting a specified amount of Mojo, destroying all the crates in the level, and finding hidden bronze, silver, and gold Tiki Masks. At certain points in the game, the player takes control of Cortex's niece Nina, who is tasked with using her raygun to transform the island's creatures into mutated henchmen. Nina's raygun can be recharged by turning a crank on the touchscreen.

== Plot ==
Doctor Neo Cortex harnesses the ancient power of Mojo and uses it to transform the peaceful creatures of the Wumpa Islands into powerful Titans. To obtain Mojo, Cortex captures a slew of Tiki Masks that act as its source, including Crash's ally Aku Aku. Crash confronts Cortex and manages to free Aku Aku as Cortex escapes. While Crash and Aku Aku venture through the archipelago and collect Mojo, Cortex tasks his henchmen Doctor N. Gin and Tiny Tiger with construction and stockpiling fuel for a colossal and purportedly unignorable "Cortexbot", and his niece Nina with continuing to mutate the local wildlife. Another minion, Dingodile, tries and fails to impede Crash. In the midst of her task, Nina — dissatisfied with her position and perceiving the plan's inadequacy — begins plotting to take over her uncle's operation, and she recruits N. Gin and Tiny following their defeat at Crash's hands. Nina eventually confronts Cortex, and it is revealed that the Cortexbot's only purpose is to dance.

Crash and Nina pursue the escaping Cortex into the Cortexbot, where Cortex feigns surrender. If the player had not gathered all the game's collectibles, Crash deflects a shot from Nina's mutating raygun back at her, transforming her into an infant. Cortex attempts to eliminate Crash himself, but he is defeated and his Cortexbot is destroyed. Cortex and a restored Nina escape to their mansion, where Cortex compliments Nina's treachery. If the player obtained 100% completion, Nina successfully shoots Crash with her raygun, transforming him into an impotent small-bodied version of himself. Nina then defeats Cortex herself, after which she orders N. Gin and Tiny to repair the Cortexbot, intending to destroy the Wumpa Islands with it.

== Development and release ==
The Nintendo DS version of Crash of the Titans was developed by Griptonite Games, a division of Amaze Entertainment, and published by Vivendi Games under its Sierra Entertainment label. Development was led by Eli Ford and Marc Hall, with Amaze's Mike Platteter and Radical Entertainment's Joe Selinske serving as producers. Kevin Chung was the lead artist, heading an art and animation team consisting of Platteter, Caleb Parrish, Jerry Vorhies, Nelson Brown, Bryan Fu, Sketch Ditty, and Nick Hamilton. The game was designed by Shawn Truesdell, Darrin Michelson, and Kami Neumiller; Truesdell and Neumiller also programmed the game alongside Platteter and Michael Humes. The music was composed by Nathaniel Papadakis, while the sound effects were designed by Matt Piersall and Jimi Barker. The voice acting for the Nintendo DS version, cast and directed by Eric Weiss, was recorded a few months after that of the console version and features a smaller pool of actors consisting of Jess Harnell, Lex Lang, Greg Eagles, Debi Derryberry, and Nolan North.

Crash of the Titans was Griptonite's second traditional 3D platformer for the Nintendo DS. Although the game engine was robust and capable of meeting upcoming challenges, the project faced a constrained timeline, limiting opportunities for gameplay refinement. The "jacking" feature required the development team to divide their focus between this mechanic and core platforming elements. To streamline the process, team leadership opted to closely replicate the mechanics, movements, and animations from the original Crash Bandicoot games on the PlayStation. By using these games as a design template, the team aimed to ensure engaging gameplay while saving substantial development time. The team sought to have the game reflect the flavor and story of the console version while playing to the platform's strengths by incorporating extensive use of the touchscreen and microphone into its gameplay. Connectivity to the Wii version was considered as a feature, but abandoned due to technical limitations and time constraints. The characters Crunch and Uka Uka, who appear in the console version, are absent from the Nintendo DS version. The Nintendo DS version of Crash of the Titans was revealed alongside the console version in April 2007, and it was released in 2007 in North America on October 2, in Europe on October 19, and in Australia on October 25.

== Reception ==
Reception

Aggregate score
Aggregator	Score
Metacritic	73/100

Review scores
Publication	Score
GameSpot	7/10
GameZone	6.9/10
IGN	8/10
Nintendo World Report	7.5/10
Pocket Gamer	6/10

Crash of the Titans received "mixed or average" reviews according to review aggregator Metacritic. Craig Harris of IGN proclaimed the game to be "a fantastic apology for Crash Boom Bang!" and postulated that Amaze Entertainment, in light of their inconsistent library, had dedicated their "A team" to the title. He praised the level design and the gameplay variety granted by the Titan mechanics and mini-games. Zachary Miller of Nintendo World Report compared the combination of platforming and beat 'em up elements to God of War, and he was excited by the fast-paced and interesting gameplay, but felt that the environments and enemy types blended together. Frank Provo of GameSpot appreciated the varied gameplay and enjoyed the jacking mechanic as a fresh addition to the Crash formula, but he lamented the game's short length. Louis Bedigian of GameZone considered the basic gameplay to be comparable to the original PlayStation games. Tracy Erickson of Pocket Gamer felt that the jacking mechanic was the game's only innovative element, regarding it as an otherwise formulaic platformer. He added that this was exemplified by the Nina levels, which he described as contrived and insubstantially paced.

The graphics were commended for their colorful and detailed presentation, though Provo occasionally experienced warped textures and glitched character models. Harris admired Crash's new design, which he deemed "a little cooler and more appealing than his more 'Japanese-inspired' edits over the years". Harris and Bedigian observed that the graphics came close to replicating those of the original PlayStation trilogy. Though Harris was disappointed by a lack of dynamic camera control, he and Provo appreciated the presence of set camera routes, which prevented "wonky" angles.

The core combat was considered repetitive and unbalanced. Bedigian criticized the overemphasis on fighting, which he said overshadowed platforming and turned the game into a repetitive "button-masher". Harris noted that the combat lacked satisfying feedback, missing the sensation of impactful attacks. Bedigian described the enemy AI as simplistic, allowing players to exploit patterns for easy wins, though Miller felt that the stronger enemies later in the game were "cheap" and frustrating.

The touchscreen mechanics, particularly for jacking enemies or triggering attacks, were criticized as awkward and poorly integrated. Critics noted that requiring players to remove hands from buttons disrupted gameplay, and the touchscreen actions (such as flicking Aku Aku) could have been mapped to buttons for simplicity. Miller also found the mechanic of drawing a path between islands for travel to be sometimes unresponsive.

The game's humor, voice acting and cutscenes were seen as overly juvenile and alienating to a broader audience, with Bedigian arguing that the Saturday morning cartoon style undermined the series' appeal to teens and adults. Harris was unenthused by the game's humor, and he and Miller criticized the laugh track, which they felt was unnecessary and inappropriately timed. Miller considered the story, focusing on Cortex's vague plot involving a dancing robot, to be poorly told and unengaging. Erickson observed that the game's childish appeal was exemplified by its exaggerated audio.
