= List of cooperative video games =

The following is a list of video games that feature cooperative gameplay, either as a primary or secondary gameplay mode.

== List ==
| Title | Platform | Genre | Year | Players | Co-op Type | Screen View | Limited | Additional Notes |
|---|---|---|---|---|---|---|---|---|
| Space Duel | Arcade | Shoot 'em up | 1982 | 2 | Local | Full | | |
| Starsiege: Tribes | PC | FPS | 1998 | 128* | Online | Full | | * according to the developers of its networking model |
| Far Cry 6 | PC, Xbox One, PS4 | FPS | 2021 | 2 | Online | Full | | |
| Sky Force Reloaded | PC, XB360, Xbox One, Switch | Scrolling shooter | 2017 | 2 | Local | Full | | |
| Fire Truck | Arcade | Racing | 1978 | 2 | Local | Shared | | |
| SpeedRunners | PC, XB360, Xbox One, PS4 | Racing | 2016 | 4 | Local, Online | Full | | |
| Broforce | PC | Side-scrolling / Action | 2012 | 4 | Local | Full | | |
| Marvel's Avengers | PC, Xbox One, PS4 | Action RPG | 2020 | 4 | Online | Full | | |
| Jumanji: The Video Game | PC, Xbox One, PS4 | TPS | 2019 | 4 | Online | Full | | |
| Fury Unleashed | PC, Xbox One, PS4, Switch | Side-scrolling / Action | 2020 | 2 | Local | | | |
| Helldivers 2 | PC, PS5, Xbox Series X/S | Third-person shooter | 2024 | 4 | Online | Full | No | * All players are able to play with each other regardless of their respective platform and the community as a whole are able to complete objectives for the glory of Super Earth. |
| Darkstone | PC, PlayStation, Android, iOS | Action RPG | 1999 | 2 | Local | Full, splitscreen | | |
| Fireboy and Watergirl in the Forest Temple | Browser | Puzzle-platform | 2009 | 2 | Local | Full | | |
| Trine 4: The Nightmare Prince | PC, Xbox One, PS4 | Platform / Puzzle | 2019 | 4 | Local, Online | Full | | |
| Tom Clancy's Ghost Recon Breakpoint | PC, Xbox One, PS4 | FPS | 2019 | 4 | Online | Full | | |
| Borderlands 3 | PC, Xbox One, PS4 | FPS | 2019 | 2, 4 | Local, Online | Full, splitscreen | | |
| Gears 5 | PC, Xbox One | Action | 2019 | 3,5 | Local, Online | Full, splitscreen | | |
| Rodland | Arcade / Amiga / Amstrad CPC / Atari ST / Commodore 64 / Game Boy / NES / ZX Spectrum / iOS | Platform | 1990 | 2 | Local | Full | | |
| Tom Clancy's The Division 2 | PC, Xbox One, PS4 | TPS | 2019 | 8 | Online | Full | | |
| The Forest | PC, PS4 | Open world | 2018 | 128 | Online | Full | | |
| Anthem | PC, Xbox One, PS4 | Action RPG | 2019 | 4 | Online | Full | | |
| Crackdown 3 | PC, Xbox One | Action-Adv. | 2019 | 4 | Online | Full | | |
| Far Cry: New Dawn | PC, Xbox One, PS4 | FPS | 2019 | 2 | Online | Full | | |
| OVERKILL's The Walking Dead | PC, Xbox One, PS4 | FPS | 2019 | 4 | Online | Full | | |
| LEGO Harry Potter Collection | Xbox One, PS4, Switch | | 2018 | 2 | Local | Full, splitscreen | | |
| LEGO DC Super-Villains | PC, Xbox One, PS4, Switch | Action | 2018 | 2 | Local | Full, splitscreen | | |
| Ashen | PC, Xbox One | Action RPG | 2018 | | Online | Full | | |
| Forza Horizon 4 | PC, Xbox One | Racing | 2018 | 6 | Online | Full | | |
| Farming Simulator 19 | PC, Xbox One, PS4 | Simulation | 2018 | 8 | Online | Full | | |
| Divinity: Original Sin | PC, Xbox One, PS4 | RPG | 2014 | 2 | Local, Online | Shared, Full | | |
| Divinity: Original Sin 2 | PC, Xbox One, PS4 | RPG | 2017 | 2, 4 | Local, Online | Shared, Full | | |
| Strange Brigade | PC, Xbox One, PS4 | Action | 2018 | 4 | Online | Full | | |
| Overcooked 2 | PC, Xbox One, PS4, Switch | Simulation | 2018 | 4 | Local, Online | Shared, Full | N/A | * Main campaign was designed specifically for 2-player cooperative play, singleplayer is essentially "one player controls both characters". |
| No Man's Sky | PC, Xbox One, PS4 | Action-Adv. | 2016 | 4 | Online | Full | | |
| Earthfall | PC, Xbox One, PS4 | FPS | 2018 | 4 | Online | Full | | |
| LEGO: The Incredibles | PC, Xbox One, PS4, Switch | Action | 2018 | 2 | Local | Full, splitscreen | | |
| Super Bomberman R | PC, Xbox One, PS4, Switch | Action | 2018 | 7 | Local | Shared | | |
| Unravel Two | PC, Xbox One, PS4 | Platform | 2018 | 2 | Local | Shared | | |
| State of Decay 2 | PC, Xbox One | Action RPG | 2018 | 4 | Online | Full | | |
| Space Hulk: Deathwing | PC, PS4 | FPS | 2018 | 4 | Online | Full | | |
| Battlezone | PC, Xbox One, PS4, Switch | FPS | 2018 | 4 | Online | Full | | |
| Far Cry 5 | PC, Xbox One, PS4 | FPS | 2018 | 2 | Online | Full | | |
| Titan Quest | PC, Xbox One, PS4, Switch | Action RPG | 2018 | 2, 6 | Local, Online | Splitscreen, Full | | |
| Warhammer: Vermintide | PC, Xbox One, PS4 | FPS | 2015 | 1-4 | Online | Full | | |
| Warhammer: Vermintide 2 | PC, Xbox One, PS4 | FPS | 2018 | 1-4 | Online | Full | | |
| Deep Rock Galactic | PC, Xbox One | FPS | 2018 | 4 | Online | Full | | |
| Monster Hunter: World | PC, Xbox One, PS4 | Action RPG | 2018 | 4 | Online | Full | | |
| Full Metal Furies | PC, Xbox One, Switch | Beat 'em up | 2018 | 4 | Local, Online | Full, Shared | | |
| 0 Day Attack on Earth | XB360* | Shoot 'em up | 2009 | 4 | Xbox Live** | Shared | No | *XBLA |
| A Way Out | PC / Xbox One / PS4 | Action-Adventure | 2018 | 2 | Local, Online | Split | | |
| A Valley Without Wind | PC | RPG | 2012 | 2 | LAN, Online | Full | | |
| A Valley Without Wind 2 | PC | RPG | 2013 | 2-8 | LAN, Online | Full | | |
| 1942: Joint Strike | PS3 / XB360* | Scrolling shooter | 2008 | 2 | Local, Online | Shared | No | *PSN / XBLA |
| 50 Cent: Blood on the Sand | PS3 / XB360 | TPS | 2009 | 2 | Online | Full | No | |
| 8 Eyes | NES | Action-Adv. | 1988 | 2 | Local | Shared | No* | *P2 controls the falcon. |
| Ace Combat 6: Fires of Liberation | XB360 | Flight Sim | 2007 | 4 | Xbox Live | Full | Yes* | *2 co-op missions; 2 more are purchasable through Xbox Live |
| Aces of the Galaxy | XB360* | Scrolling shooter | 2008 | 2 | Local, Xbox Live | Shared | No | *XBLA |
| Advance Guardian Heroes | GBA | Beat 'em up | 2004 | 2 | Local | Shared | No(?) | |
| Adventures of Cookie & Cream, The | PS2 | Puzzle | 2001 | 2 | Local | Shared | No | |
| Aegis Wing | XB360* | Scrolling shooter | 2007 | 4 | Local, Xbox Live | Shared | No(?) | XBLA |
| Aero Fighters | Arcade / SNES | Scrolling shooter | 1993 | 2 | Local | Shared | No | |
| Aero Fighters 2 | Arcade | Scrolling shooter | 1994 | 2 | Local | Shared | No | |
| Aero Fighters 3 | Arcade | Scrolling shooter | 1995 | 2 | Local | Shared | No | |
| Age of Empires (series) | PC | RTS | 1997+ | 8 | LAN, Online | Full | Yes* | *SP Campaign is not available; AI skirmishes and custom scenarios only |
| The Lord of the Rings: War in the North (series) | PC | RPG | 2011 | 3 | LAN, Online | Full | No | |
| Ai War | PC | RTS | 2009 | 10 | LAN, Online | Full | No | |
| Alien Breed | PC / Amiga | Shoot 'em up | 1991 | 2 | Local | Shared | No | |
| Alien Breed: Tower Assault | PC / Amiga | Shoot 'em up | 1994 | 2 | Local | Shared | No | |
| Alien Hominid | GC / PS2 / Xbox / XB360* | Shoot 'em up | 2005 | 2 | Local | Shared | No | *XBLA |
| Alien Syndrome | NES / SMS / Other / PS2* | Shoot 'em up | 1987 | 2 | Local | Shared | No | *Part of Sega Ages 2500, vol.13 and Sega Classics Collection |
| Alien Syndrome | Wii | Action RPG | 2007 | 4 | Local | Shared | No | |
| Alien Swarm | PC | Shoot-em-up | 2010 | 4 | LAN, Online | Full | N/A | * This game was designed specifically for co-op play. |
| Alien 3: The Gun | Arcade | Shoot 'em up | 1993 | 2 | Local | Shared | No | |
| Alien vs. Predator | Arcade | Beat 'em up | 1994 | 2* | Local | Shared | No | *Certain cabinets support 3 players. |
| Aliens: Colonial Marines | PC / PS3 / XB360 | FPS | 2013 | 4 | Online, Local*, LAN* | Full | ? | *Splitscreen 2 Player Co-op Only for Console versions |
| Aliens vs. Predator* | PC | FPS | 1999 | 8 | LAN, Online | Full | Yes** | *Also applies to Gold Ed. and Millennium Pack. **SP Campaign is not available; limited bot matches only. |
| Aliens vs. Predator 2 | PC | FPS | 2002 | ? | LAN, Online | Full | No | * SP campaign coop available via community mod. (X-Coop Beta 2.5) |
| Aliens vs. Predator: Requiem | PSP | TPS | 2007 | 2 | Ad Hoc | Full | Yes | *SP Campaign is not available; limited bot matches only |
| Aliens | Arcade | Shoot 'em up | 1990 | 2 | Local | Shared | No | |
| Alpha Mission II | Arcade | Scrolling shooter | 1991 | 2 | Local | Shared | No | |
| Altered Beast | Arcade / GEN / Other | Beat 'em up | 1988 | 2 | Local | Shared | No | |
| America's Army | PC | Tactical FPS | 2006 | 9–18 | LAN, Online | Full | No | Interdiction and Snake Plain maps from v2.7 have 18 player Coop vs. AI play |
| Amok | Saturn | TPS | 1996 | 2 | Local | Shared(?) | No(?) | |
| An Elder Scrolls Legend: Battlespire | PC | Action RPG | 1997 | ? | LAN | Full | No | |
| Andro Dunos | Arcade | Scrolling shooter | 1992 | 2 | Local | Shared | No | |
| Arcus Odyssey | SNES / GEN | Action RPG | 1991 | 2 | Local | Shared | No | |
| Area 51 | PS1 / Arcade / Saturn | Shooter | 1995 | 2 | Local | Shared | No | |
| Arkadian Warriors | XB360* | Action RPG | 2007 | 2 | Local, Xbox Live | Shared | No | *XBLA |
| Arkanoid Live! | XB360* | Action | 2009 | 2 | Local, Xbox Live | Shared | No | *XBLA |
| ArmA: Armed Assault | PC | Tactical FPS | 2006 | 32 | LAN, Online | Full | Yes* | *Bot matches. Downloadable missions. |
| ARMA 2 | PC | Tactical FPS | 2009 | 4*, <255** | LAN, Online | Full | No | * Main campaign. ** 2 to 255 in downloadable missions + Join in Progress. |
| ARMA 3 | PC | Tactical FPS | 2013 | 4*, <255** | LAN, Online | Full | No | * Main campaign. ** 2 to 255 in downloadable missions + Join in Progress. |
| Armored Core: For Answer | PS3 / XB360 | Mecha Sim | 2008 | 2 | Online | Full | No* | *Several missions are SP only |
| Armored Warriors | Arcade | Beat 'em up | 1994 | 3 | Local | Shared | No | |
| Armorines: Project S.W.A.R.M. | N64 | FPS | 1999 | 2 | Local | Split | No | |
| Army of Two | PS3 / XB360 | TPS | 2008 | 2 | Local, Online | Split, Full | No | |
| Army of Two: The 40th Day | PS3 / XB360 | TPS | 2009 | 2 | Local, Online | Split, Full | No | |
| Army of Two: The Devil's Cartel | PS3 / XB360 | TPS | 2013 | 2 | Local, Online | Split, Full | No | |
| Artemis: Spaceship Bridge Simulator | PC / Android / iOS | Space Sim | 2010 | 2-11 | LAN | Full | No | |
| Assault Heroes | PC | Shoot 'em up | 2006 | 2 | Online | Shared | No | Connection to game server required |
| Assault Heroes | XB360* | Shoot 'em up | 2006 | 2 | Local, Xbox Live | Shared | No | *XBLA |
| Assault Heroes 2 | XB360* | Shoot 'em up | 2008 | 2 | Local, Xbox Live | Shared | No | *XBLA |
| Bad Dudes | Arcade / NES / Other | Beat 'em up | 1988 | 2 | Local | Shared | No | |
| Baldur's Gate | PC | RPG | 1998 | 6 | LAN, Online | Full | No | |
| Baldur's Gate II: Shadows of Amn | PC | RPG | 2000 | 6 | LAN, Online | Full | No | |
| Baldur's Gate: Dark Alliance | GC / PS2 / Xbox | Action RPG | 2001 | 2 | Local | Shared | No | |
| Baldur's Gate: Dark Alliance II | PS2 / Xbox | Action RPG | 2004 | 2 | Local | Shared | No | |
| Batman Forever | SNES / GEN / PC / SMS | Beat 'em up | 1995 | 2 | Local | Shared | No | |
| Batman Forever: The Arcade Game | PC / PS1 / Saturn | Beat 'em up | 1996 | 2 | Local | Shared | No | |
| Batman: Rise of Sin Tzu | GC / PS2 / Xbox | Beat 'em up | 2003 | 2 | Local | Shared | No | |
| Battle Engine Aquila | PC / PS2 / Xbox | FPS | 2003 | 2 | Local | Split | Yes* | *3 separate co-op missions |
| Battle Circuit | Arcade | Beat 'em up | 1997 | 4 | Local | Shared | No | |
| Battle City | NES | Shoot 'em up | 1985 | 2 | Local | Full | No | |
| Battlefield (series) | PC | FPS | 2002+ | 16* | LAN, Online | Full | Yes** | 2 teams of up to 16–32 players, depending on game. **No SP campaigns: bot matches only. |
| BattleForge | PC | RTS | 2009 | 12 | Online | Full | No | Finally, this game will be closed on 31 October at midnight (UTC) |
| BattleTanx: Global Assault | N64 | Car Combat | 1999 | 2 | Local | Split | No | |
| Battletoads | Arcade / NES / GEN | Beat 'em up | 1991 | 2 | Local | Shared | No | |
| Battletoads & Double Dragon | NES / SNES / GEN | Beat 'em up | 1993 | 2 | Local | Shared | No | |
| Battletoads in Battlemaniacs | SNES / SMS | Beat 'em up | 1993 | 2 | Local | Shared | No | |
| Bionic Commando Rearmed | PC / PS3 / XB360* | Platform | 2008 | 2 | Local | Shared | No | *PSN / XBLA |
| Blacklight: Retribution | PC | FPS | 2012 | 4 | Online | Full | | |
| Blades of Vengeance | GEN | Beat 'em up | 1993 | 2 | Local | Shared | No | |
| Blast Factor | PS3 | Puzzle | 2006 | 4 | Local(?) | Shared(?) | No* | *"Blast Factor Multiplayer Pack" is required for the US version |
| Blast Works: Build, Trade, Destroy | Wii | Scrolling shooter | 2008 | 4 | Local | Shared | No | |
| Bloodwych | Amiga / Atari ST / PC | Role-Playing Game | 1989 | 2 | Split | Shared | No | |
| Bloody Trapland | PC | Platform | 2011 | 4 | LAN, Online | Full | No | |
| Bonanza Bros. | Arcade / GEN / Other | Platform | 1990 | 2 | Local | Split | No | |
| Boogie Bunnies | XB360* | Puzzle | 2008 | 2 | Local | Shared | No | *XBLA |
| Boom Blox | Wii | Puzzle | 2008 | 4 | Local | Shared | Yes* | *No SP campaign. Turn-based gameplay. Co-op content needs to be unlocked through SP. |
| Borderlands | PC / PS3 / XB360 | FPS | 2009 | 4 | Local, LAN, Online | Split, Full | No* | * This game was designed specifically for co-op play. |
| Borderlands 2 | PC / MAC / PS3 / XB360 | FPS / Action RPG | 2012 | 4 | LAN, Online | Full | No* | * This game was designed specifically for co-op play. |
| Borderlands: The Pre-Sequel | PC / MAC / PS3 / XB360 | FPS / Action RPG | 2014 | 4 | Online | Full | No* | * This game was designed specifically for co-op play. |
| Brawl Brothers* | SNES | Beat 'em up | 1993 | 2 | Local | Shared | No | *Also known as "Rushing Beat Ran Fukusei Toshi"; 2nd game in the Rushing Beat series |
| Brute Force | Xbox | Tactical TPS | 2003 | 4 | Local | Split | No | |
| Bubble Bobble | Arcade / NES / SMS / C64 / ZXS / Other | Platform | 1986 | 2 | Local | Shared | No | |
| Bubble Memories | Arcade | Platform | 1995 | 2 | Local | Shared | No | |
| Bubble Symphony* | Arcade / Saturn | Platform | 1994 | 2 | Local | Shared | No | *Also known as "Bubble Bobble 2" |
| Bugs Bunny & Taz: Time Busters | PC / PS1 | Platform | 2000 | 2 | Local | Shared | No | |
| Burning Fight | Arcade | Beat 'em up | 1991 | 2 | Local | Shared | No | |
| Burnout Paradise | PC / PS3 / XB360 | Racing | 2008 | 8 | Online | Full | Yes** | **Completely different objectives |
| C-Dogs | PC / DS | Shoot 'em up | 1997 | 2-4* | Local | Split, Shared | No | Low-budget freeware *Up to 4 players supported in the open source port C-Dogs SDL |
| Cadillacs and Dinosaurs | Arcade | Beat 'em up | 1993 | 3 | Local | Shared | No(?) | |
| Cadillacs and Dinosaurs: The Second Cataclysm | Sega CD | Car Combat | 1994 | 2 | Local | Shared | No* | *P1 drives, P2 shoots |
| Call of Duty: Modern Warfare 2 | PC / PS3 / XB360 | FPS | 2009* | 2 | LAN, | Full | Yes* | *SP Campaign is not available; separate Special Ops co-op mode. |
| Call of Duty: World at War | PC | FPS | 2008 | 4 | LAN, Online | Full | No* | *2 levels, "Black Cats" and "Vendetta" are SP only. Downloadable Nazi Zombies maps. |
| Call of Duty: World at War | PS3 / XB360 | FPS | 2008 | 2* | Local, Online | Split, Full | No** | *Up to 4 online. **2 levels are SP only. |
| Call of Duty: World at War | Wii | FPS | 2008 | 2 | Local | Full | Yes* | *P2 controls are limited to an additional reticle. |
| Captain America and the Avengers | Arcade / NES / SNES / DC / GEN | Beat 'em up | 1991 | 2* | Local | Shared | No | *Up to 4, depending on platform |
| Captain Commando | Arcade / SNES / PS1 / PS2* / Xbox* | Beat 'em up | 1991 | 2** | Local | Shared | No | *Part of Capcom Classics Collection Vol.2; **Up to 4 in arcade version |
| Captain Toad: Treasure Tracker | Wii U, Nintendo Switch, Nintendo 3DS | Puzzle Platform | 2014, 2018 | 2 | Local | Shared | No | Co-operative play (assist mode and adventure mode) are exclusive to the Nintendo Switch port of the game. |
| Carrier Air Wing | Arcade | Scrolling shooter | 1990 | 2 | Local | Shared | No | |
| Castle Crashers | XB360* | Beat 'em up | 2008 | 4 | Local, Xbox Live | Shared | No | *XBLA |
| Champions of Norrath | PS2 | Action RPG | 2004 | 4 | Local, Online | Shared | No | |
| Champions: Return to Arms | PS2 | Action RPG | 2005 | 4 | Local, Online | Shared | No | |
| Chaos Engine, The* | Amiga / PC / SNES / GEN / Other | Shoot 'em up | 1993 | 2 | Local | Shared | No | *Also known as "Soldiers of Fortune". |
| Children of Mana | DS | Action RPG | 2006 | 4 | Local | Full | No* | *Minor save issues |
| Chip 'n Dale Rescue Rangers | NES | Platform | 1990 | 2 | Local | Full | No | |
| Chip 'n Dale Rescue Rangers 2 | NES | Platform | 1994 | 2 | Local | Full | No | |
| Chronicles of Narnia: Prince Caspian, The | PC / PS2 / PS3 / XB360 / DS / PSP / Wii | Action-Adv. | 2008 | 2 | Local* | Shared | No | *Platform differences may apply |
| Chronicles of Narnia: The Lion, the Witch and the Wardrobe, The | PC / PS2 / Xbox / DS / GBA / GC | Action-Adv. | 2005 | 2 | Local* | Shared | No | *Platform differences may apply |
| Civilization IV (Addon 1)(Addon 2) | PC | TBS | 2005 | 8 | LAN, Online, Local | Full | No | Custom games; turn based/simultaneous modes. |
| Civilization IV: Colonization | PC | TBS | 2008 | 8 | LAN, Online, Local | Full | No | Custom games; turn based/simultaneous modes. |
| Cliffhanger: Edward Randy, The | Arcade | Action-Adv. | 1990 | 2 | Local | Shared | No | |
| Cloning Clyde | XB360* | Platform | 2006 | 4 | Local, Xbox Live | Split, Full | No | *XBLA. Simultaneous split-screen and online play possible. |
| Close Combat: First to Fight | PC | FPS | 2005 | 4 | LAN, Online | Full | No | |
| Close Combat: First to Fight | Xbox | FPS | 2005 | 4 | Local, System Link, Xbox Live | Split, Full(?) | ? | |
| Codename: Outbreak | PC | FPS | 2001 | | | | | |
| Combatribes, The | Arcade / SNES | Beat 'em up | 1992 | 2 | Local | Shared | No | |
| Command & Conquer (series) | PC | RTS | 1996+ | 8 | LAN, Online | Full | Yes* | *SP Campaign is not available; AI skirmishes only |
| Command & Conquer: Red Alert 3 | PC | RTS | 2008 | 2 | Online | Full | No* | * Main campaign was designed specifically for 2-player cooperative play, singleplayer is essentially "co-op with a bot". |
| Command & Conquer 4: Tiberian Twilight | PC | RTS | 2010 | 2 | Online* | Full | No | |
| Command & Conquer: Renegade | PC | FPS | 2001 | 128* | Online, LAN | Full | No | *This is the maximum the game can support, true limits vary by server |
| Conflict: Denied Ops | PC | FPS | 2008 | 2 | LAN, Online | Full | No | |
| Conflict: Denied Ops | PS3 / XB360 | FPS | 2008 | 2 | Local, System Link, Online | Split, Full | No | |
| Conflict: Desert Storm | GC / PS2 / Xbox | TPS | 2002 | 2* | Local | Split | No | *Up to 4 in GC and Xbox versions |
| Conflict: Desert Storm II | GC / PS2 / Xbox | TPS | 2003 | 2* | Local | Split | No | *Up to 4 in GC and Xbox versions |
| Conflict: Global Terror* | PC | TPS | 2005 | 4 | LAN, Online | Full | No | *Also known as "Conflict: Global Storm". |
| Conflict: Global Terror* | PS2 / Xbox | TPS | 2005 | 4 | Local | Split | No | *Also known as "Conflict: Global Storm". |
| Contra | Arcade / C64 / NES / PC / ZXS / Other / DS*/XB360** | Shoot 'em up | 1987 | 2 | Local | Shared | No | *Part of Konami Classics Series: Arcade Hits **XBLA |
| Contra 4* | DS | Shoot 'em up | 2007 | 2 | Ad hoc** | Shared | No | *Also known as "Contra: Dual Spirits" **Multicard |
| Contra Advance: The Alien Wars EX* | GBA | Shoot 'em up | 2002 | 2 | Link cable | Shared | No | *Also known as "Contra: Hard Spirits" |
| Contra Force | NES | Shoot 'em up | 1992 | 2 | Local | Shared | No | |
| Contra III: The Alien Wars* | SNES | Shoot 'em up | 1992 | 2 | Local | Split, Shared | No | *Also known as "Contra Spirits" |
| Contra: Hard Corps* | GEN | Shoot 'em up | 1994 | 2 | Local | Shared | No | *Also known as "Probotector" |
| Contra: Legacy of War | PS1 / Saturn | Shoot 'em up | 1996 | 2 | Local | Shared | No | |
| Contra: Shattered Soldier | PS2 | Shoot 'em up | 2002 | 2 | Local | Shared | No | |
| Cortex Command | PC | Shoot 'em up | 2008 | 4 | Local | Shared | ? | |
| Crack Down | GEN | Shoot 'em up | 1990 | 2 | Local | Shared | ? | |
| Crackdown | XB360 | TPS | 2008 | 2 | System Link, Xbox Live | Shared | Yes | |
| Crash Bash | PS1 | Mini games | 2000 | 2 | Local | Shared | no | |
| Crash: Mind over Mutant | PS2 / XB360 / DS / Wii / PSP | Action | 2008 | 2 | Local | Shared | Yes* | *P2 involvement is limited |
| Crash of the Titans | PS2 / XB360 / DS / Wii / PSP | Action | 2007 | 2 | Local | Shared | No* | *Portable console limitations may apply |
| Crime Fighters | Arcade | Beat 'em up | 1989 | 4(?) | Local | Shared | No(?) | |
| Crimson Sea 2 | PS2 | Beat 'em up | 2004 | 2 | Local | Split | Yes* | *Have to complete mission in SP to get it co-op unlocked |
| Crossed Swords | Arcade | Beat 'em up | 1991 | 2 | Local | Shared | No | |
| Cyborg Justice | GEN | Beat 'em up | 1993 | 2 | Local | Shared | No | |
| Cult of the Lamb | PC / Xbox One / Xbox Series X/S / PS4 / PS5 / Switch | Roguelike | 2022 | 2 | Local | Shared | No* | *Cooperative multiplayer patch required |
| Cuphead | PC / Xbox One / PS4 / Switch | Run and gun | 2017 | 2 | Local | Shared | No | |
| Daikatana | PC | FPS | 2000 | 3 | LAN, Online | Full | Yes* | *No storyline cutscenes and team NPCs |
| Damnation | PC / PS3 / XB360 | TPS | 2009 | 2 | Local, LAN, Online | Split, Full | No* | * Campaign is designed around 2-player coop. Singleplayer is essentially co-op with a bot. |
| Dandy | Atari 8-bit | Beat 'em up | 1983 | 4 | Local | Shared | | Inspired Gauntlet |
| Dangerous Waters | PC | Sim | 2005 | 32 | LAN, Online | Full | Yes | |
| Darius Gaiden | Arcade / PC / PS1 / Saturn / PS2 / Xbox* | Scrolling shooter | 1994 | 2 | Local | Shared | No | *Also known as "Darius III". **As part of Taito Legends 2. |
| Darius II | Arcade / PS2 / GEN / Saturn / SMS | Scrolling shooter | 1989 | 2 | Local | Shared | No | |
| Darius Twin | SNES | Scrolling shooter | 1991 | 2 | Local | Shared | No | |
| Dark Chambers | Atari 2600 | Action-Adv. | 1983 | 2 | Local | Full | No | |
| Darkspore | PC | Action RPG | 2011 | 4 | Online | Full | No | |
| Dark Souls | PS3 / XB360 | Action RPG | 2011 | 3 | Online | Full | No | Only in certain parts of the game |
| Darkwatch | PS2 / Xbox | FPS | 2005 | 2 | Local | Split | No | |
| Dead Island | PC / PS3 / XB360 | Action RPG | 2011 | 4 | LAN, Online | Full | No* | Full campaign, but the game has some noticeable bugs that cause level/xp imbalance, and co-op partners often do not get mission rewards. |
| Dead or Alive 2 | Arcade, DC, PS2 | Fighting | 1999 | 4 | Local | Full | Yes* | *2-player co-op in Tag Battle mode only. |
| Dead or Alive 3 | Xbox | Fighting | 2001 | 4 | Local | Full | Yes* | *2-player co-op in Tag Battle mode only. |
| Dead or Alive Ultimate | Xbox | Fighting | 2004 | 4 | Local, Online | Full | Yes* | *2-player co-op in Tag Battle mode only. |
| Dead or Alive 4 | XB360 | Fighting | 2005 | 4 | Local, Online | Full | Yes* | *2-player co-op in Tag Battle mode only. |
| Dead or Alive Online | PC | Fighting | 2008 | ? | Online | Full | Yes* | *2-player co-op in Tag Battle mode only. |
| Dead or Alive: Dimensions | 3DS | Fighting | 2011 | 2 | Local, Online | Full | Yes* | *2-player co-op in Tag Battle mode only. |
| Dead or Alive 5 | PS3, XB360 | Fighting | 2012 | 4 | Local, Online | Full | Yes* | *2-player co-op in Tag Battle mode only. |
| Dead or Alive 5 Plus | PS Vita | Fighting | 2013 | 4 | Local, Online | Full | Yes* | *2-player co-op in Tag Battle mode only. |
| Dead or Alive 5 Ultimate | PS3, XB360, Arcade | Fighting | 2013 | 4 | Local, Online | Full | Yes* | *2-player co-op in Tag Battle mode only. |
| Dead or Alive 5 Last Round | PS4, PC, Xbox One, PS3, XB360, Arcade | Fighting | 2015 | 4 | Local, Online | Full | Yes* | *2-player co-op in Tag Battle mode only. |
| Dead Pixels | XB360* | Action game | 2011 | 2 | Local | Shared | No | *Xbox Live Indie Games |
| Dead Rising 2 | PC / PS3 / XB360 | Action RPG | 2010 | 2 | Online | Full | No | |
| Dead Rising 2: Off the Record | PC / PS3 / XB360 | Action RPG | 2011 | 2 | Online | Full | No | |
| Dead Space 3 | PC / PS3 / XB360 | TPS | 2013 | 2 | Online | Full | No | |
| Death Jr.: Root of Evil | Wii | Action-Adv. | 2008 | 2 | Local | Split | No | |
| Deathsmiles | Arcade / XB360* | Scrolling shooter | 2007 | 2 | Local | Shared | No | *XBLA |
| Death Squared | PC, Xbox One, PS4, Switch, Android, iOS | Puzzle | 2017 | 2-4 | Local | Full | N/A | * Main campaign was designed specifically for 2-player cooperative play, singleplayer is essentially "one player controls both characters". |
| Delta Force | PC | FPS | 1998 | ? | LAN, Online | Full | No | Requires IPX for LAN Play |
| Delta Force 2 | PC | FPS | 1999 | ? | LAN, Online | Full | No | Requires IPX for LAN Play |
| Delta Force: Black Hawk Down | PS2 / Xbox | FPS | 2003 | 2 | Local | Split | ? | |
| Delta Force: Land Warrior | PC | FPS | 2000 | 4 | LAN, Online | Full | No | |
| Delta Force: Task Force Dagger | PC | FPS | 2002 | 8 | LAN, Online | Full | No* | *Cooperative multiplayer patch required |
| Demon's Souls | PS3 | Action RPG | 2009 | 3 | Online | Full | No | |
| Descent | PC | FPS | 1995 | | LAN, Online | | | |
| Descent II | PC | FPS | 1996 | | LAN, Online | | | |
| Descent Maximum | PS1 | FPS | 1997 | 2 | Link Cable | Full(?) | | |
| Descent: FreeSpace – The Great War | PC | Space Sim | 1998 | | LAN, Online | | | |
| Descent 3 | PC | FPS | 2000 | | LAN, Online | | | |
| Diablo (expansion 1) | PC | Action RPG | 1996 | 4(?) | IPX, Online | Full | No | |
| Diablo | PS1 | Action RPG | 1998 | 2 | Local | Shared | No | |
| Diablo II (expansion 1) | PC | Action RPG | 2000 | 8 | LAN, Online | Full | No | |
| Diablo III | PC | Action RPG | 2012 | 4 | Online | Full | * | |
| Die Hard Arcade* | Arcade / Saturn / PS2** | Beat 'em up | 1996 | 2 | Local | Shared | No | *also known as "Dynamite Deka" **Part of Sega Ages 2500, vol.26 |
| Diddy Kong Racing | N64 | Racing | 1997 | 2 | Local | Split | Yes* | *The cheat code "Jointventure" is required to use in order to gain access to Co-op Adventure mode. 2P is active during races but cannot move in the overworld area. |
| Digimon World 4 | GC | Action RPG | 2005 | 4 | Local | Shared | Yes* | *Players can only move within the screen area and screen does not split. |
| Din's Curse | PC | Action RPG / Action | 2010 | 2+* | LAN, Online | Full | No | *An upper limit for the "maximum players" setting is not enforced |
| The Dishwasher: Dead Samurai | XB360* | Platform | 2009 | 3 | Local | Shared | No** | *XBLA **Find 2 amulets on the 2nd level of SP to unlock co-op. |
| Donkey Kong Country | SNES / GBA | Platform | 1994 | 2 | Local | Shared | Yes* | *Not simultaneous play. One player controls until damaged/life lost, then other player takes control. |
| Donkey Kong Country 2: Diddy's Kong Quest | SNES / GBA | Platform | 1995 | 2 | Local | Shared | Yes* | *Not simultaneous play. One player controls until damaged/life lost, then other player takes control. |
| Donkey Kong Country 3: Dixie Kong's Double Trouble! | SNES / GBA | Platform | 1996 | 2 | Local | Shared | Yes* | *Not simultaneous play. One player controls until damaged/life lost, then other player takes control. |
| Doom | PC | FPS | 1993 | 4 | LAN, Online(?) | Full | No | |
| Doom II: Hell on Earth | PC | FPS | 1994 | 4 | LAN, Online | Full | No | |
| Doom II: Hell on Earth | GBA | FPS | 2002 | 2 | Link Cable | Full | No | |
| Doom 3 | PC | FPS | 2004 | ? | LAN, Online | Full | No | |
| Doom 3 | Xbox | FPS | 2005 | 2 | System Link, Xbox Live | Full | No | |
| Doom 3: Resurrection of Evil | PC | FPS | 2005 | ? | LAN, Online | Full | No* | * SP campaign coop available via community mod. ("d3opencoop") |
| Doom 3: Resurrection of Evil | Xbox | FPS | 2005 | 4 | System Link, Xbox Live | Split, Full | Yes* | *Only bonus content Ultimate Doom, Doom II and Master Levels for Doom II are co-op playable. |
| Dota 2 | PC | MOBA | 2013 | 5 | LAN, online | Shared | No | |
| Double Dragon | Arcade / NES / GEN / Other / XB360* | Beat 'em up | 1987 | 2 | Local, Xbox Live** | Shared | No | *XBLA **Xbox 360 only |
| Double Dragon 3: The Rosetta Stone | PC / Arcade / NES / GEN | Beat 'em up | 1990 | 2 | Local | Shared | No | |
| Double Dragon II: The Revenge | Arcade / NES / GEN | Beat 'em up | 1989 | 2 | Local | Shared | No | |
| Draglade | DS | Fighting | 2007 | 2 | Local | Full | No | |
| Dr Mario Rx | Wii | Puzzle | 2008 | 4 | Local | Full | Yes | Can play virus blaster cooperatively with up to 4 players, with jumping in and out of play. |
| Drox Operative | PC | Action RPG | 2012 | 2+* | LAN, Online | Full | No | *An upper limit for the "maximum players" setting is not enforced |
| Duke Nukem 3D | PC / XB360 | FPS | 1996 | 2-8 | LAN, Online | Full | No | |
| Dungeon | PDP-10 | Early RPG | 1975 | ? | ? | ? | ? | |
| Dungeon Lords | PC | Action RPG | 2005 | | | | | |
| Dungeon Siege | PC | Action RPG | 2002 | 8 | LAN, Online | Full | No | SP-Campaign + Additional Koop-Content |
| Dungeon Siege II (expansion 1) | PC | Action RPG | 2005 | | LAN, Online | Full | No | |
| Dungeon Siege: Throne of Agony | PSP | Action RPG | 2006 | 2 | | | | |
| Dungeons & Dragons: Shadow over Mystara | Arcade / Saturn* | Beat 'em up / RPG | 1996 | 2** | Local | Shared | No | *Part of Dungeons & Dragons Collection. **4 in arcade version |
| Dungeons & Dragons: Tower of Doom | Arcade / Saturn* | Beat 'em up / RPG | 1996 | 2** | Local | Shared | No | *Part of Dungeons & Dragons Collection. **4 in arcade version |
| Dynamite Cop* | Arcade / DC | Beat 'em up | 1998 | 2 | Local | Shared | No | *also known as "Dynamite Deka 2" |
| Dynasty Warriors 3 | PS2 / Xbox | Beat 'em up | 2001 | 2 | Local | Split | No | see Xtreme Legends(PS2) |
| Dynasty Warriors 4 | PS2 / Xbox / PC* | Beat 'em up | 2005 | 2 | Local | Split | No | *see DW4 versions and expansions |
| Dynasty Warriors 5 | PS2 / Xbox / XB360* | Beat 'em up | 2005 | 2 | Local | Split | No | *see DW5 expansions |
| Dynasty Warriors 6 | PS3 / XB360 | Beat 'em up | 2007 | 2 | Local | Split | No | |
| Dynasty Warriors: Gundam | PS3 / XB360 | Beat 'em up | 2007 | 2 | Local | Split | No | |
| Dynasty Warriors: Gundam 2 | PS3 / XB360 | Beat 'em up | 2009 | 2 | Local | Split | No | |
| Dynasty Warriors: Gundam 3 | PS3 / XB360 | Beat 'em up | 2010 | 2/4* | Local, Online | Split | No | *2 players offline and 4 players online. |
| Dynasty Wars | Arcade | Beat 'em up | 1989 | 2 | Local | Shared | No | |
| E.X. Troopers | 3DS / PS3 | Action | 2012 | 2-3 | Local*, Online** | Full | Yes | *3DS only **PS3 only |
| Earth 2150 | PC | RTS | 2000 | 8 | Local, Online | Full | No | |
| Earth 2160 | PC | RTS | 2005 | 8 | Local, Online | Full | No | |
| Earth Defense Force 2017 | XB360 | TPS | 2006 | 3 | Local, Online | Full | No | |
| Earth Defense Force: Insect Armageddon | XB360 | TPS | 2011 | 2 | Local | Split | No | |
| Endless Ocean | Wii | Adventure | 2008 | 2 | WFC | Full | Yes* | *Joint divings |
| Eragon | PC / PS2 / Xbox / XB360 / DS / GBA / PSP | Action-Adv. | 2006 | 2 | Local | Shared | No | |
| Eternal Sonata | PS3 / XB360 | jRPG | 2007 | 3 | Local | Shared | Yes* | **Co-op is extremely limited: turn-based battles only |
| Evil Islands: Curse of the Lost Soul | PC | RPG / Stealth / RTS | 2000 | 6 | Local, Online | Full | Yes* | **Network co-op quests |
| James Bond 007: Everything or Nothing | GC / PS2 / Xbox | TPS | 2004 | 2 | Local, Online* | Split, Full* | Yes** | *PS2 version only **No SP campaign; separate co-op missions |
| Savage Bees* | Arcade / NES / PS1 / Saturn / Xbox / PS2** | Scrolling shooter | 1985 | 2 | Local | Shared | No | *US title: "Super Floating Fortress Exed Exes"; **Part of Capcom's Classics Collection and Generations |
| F.E.A.R. 3 | PS3 / XB360 PC | FPS | 2011 | 2/4* | Online | Full | No | *Full SP Campaign, 4 Player Horde Mode |
| F-22 Lightning 3 | PC | Flight Sim | 1999 | 8 | LAN, Online | Full | Yes* | *No SP campaign; separate co-op missions |
| Fable II | XB360 | Action RPG | 2008 | 2 | Local, Xbox Live | Shared | Yes* | *Numerous P2 limitations |
| Fable III | XB360, PC | Action RPG | 2010(XB360), 2011(PC) | 2 | Local, Xbox Live | | | |
| Faces of War | PC | RTS | 2006 | 4 | LAN, Online | Full | No | |
| Fairytale Fights | PC / PS3 / XB360 | Beat 'em up | 2009 | 4 | Local, Online | ? | No | |
| Fantastic 4 | PC / GC / PS2 / Xbox | Beat 'em up | 2005 | 2 | Local | Shared | No | |
| Fantastic Four | PS1 | Beat 'em up | 1997 | 4 | Local | Shared | No | |
| Fallout: Brotherhood of Steel | PS2 / Xbox | Action RPG | 2004 | 2 | Local | Shared | No | |
| Far Cry | PC | FPS | 2004 | | LAN, Online | Full | No | |
| Far Cry 3 | PC / PS3 / XB360 | FPS | 2012 | 4 | Online | Full | No | *Co-op story is a prequel to the single-player story |
| FIFA (series) | * | Sports | 1993+* | * | * | Shared, Full | No | *Numerous versions, see the main page |
| Fighting Force | PC / N64 / PS1 | Beat 'em up | 1997 | 2 | Local | Shared | No | |
| Final Doom* | PC | FPS | 1996 | 4 | LAN, Online | Full | No | |
| Final Fantasy VI | SNES / PS1 | RPG | 1994 | 2 | Local | Full | Yes* | *Battles only |
| Final Fantasy IX | PS1 | RPG | 2000 | 2 | Local | Shared | Yes | *Battles only |
| Final Fantasy: Crystal Chronicles | GC | RPG | 2003 | 2-4 | Local | Full | No | |
| Final Fantasy Tactics: The War of the Lions | PSP | TBS | 2007 | 2 | Ad Hoc | Full | No(?) | |
| Final Fight | Arcade / SNES / C64 / ZXS / GBA / PS2 / Xbox* | Beat 'em up | 1989 | 2 | Local | Shared | No | *Part of Capcom Classics Collection Vol.1 |
| Final Fight 2 | SNES | Beat 'em up | 1993 | 2 | Local | Shared | No | |
| Final Fight 3* | SNES | Beat 'em up | 1995 | 2 | Local | Shared | No | *Also known as "Final Fight Tough". |
| Final Fight: Streetwise | PS2 / Xbox | Beat 'em up | 2006 | 2 | Local | Shared | No(?)* | *Co-op Arcade mode. |
| FreeSpace 2 | PC | Space Sim | 1999 | | LAN, Online | Full | | |
| Freeciv | PC | TBS | 1996* | ? | LAN, Online | Full | No** | *Ongoing development **Custom matches only. |
| Freelancer | PC | Space Sim | 2003 | 128 | LAN, Online | Full | No | |
| Frozen Synapse | PC | Turn-based tactics | 2011 | 2 | LAN, Online | Full | No* | * Campaign coop requires the "Frozen Synapse Red" expansion pack. |
| Full Spectrum Warrior | PC / Xbox / PS2 | Tactical FPS | 2004 | 2 | LAN, Online | Full | ? | |
| Full Spectrum Warrior: Ten Hammers | PC / Xbox / PS2 | Tactical FPS | 2006 | 2 | LAN, Online | Full | No* | *Levels have to be completed in SP first. Hint: use the fullspectrumpwnage code ("Bonus"->"Cheats") to unlock all co-op levels. |
| Future Cop: LAPD | PC / PS1 | TPS | 1998 | 2 | Local, LAN* | Split, Full* | No | |
| G-Darius | Arcade / PC / PS1 / PS2* | Scrolling shooter | 1997 | 2 | Local | Shared | No | *As part of Taito Legends 2. |
| G.I. Joe: The Rise of Cobra | PS2 / PS3 / XB360 / Wii PSP / DS | Shoot 'em up | 2009 | 2 | Local | Shared | No | |
| Gain Ground | Arcade / GEN / SMS / PC Engine / PS2 / Other | Action / Strategy | 1988 | 2* | Local | Shared | No | *Up to 3 in arcade version |
| Gatling Gears | PS3 / PC / XB360 | Twin-Stick Shooter | 2011 | 2 | Local, Online | Shared | No | |
| Gauntlet | Arcade / XB360* | Beat 'em up | 1985 | 4 | Local | Shared | No | *XBLA |
| Gauntlet | NES / GEN | Beat 'em up | 1987 | 2 | Local | Shared | No | |
| Gauntlet | DS | Beat 'em up | 2008* | 4 | Online | Full | No | *Cancelled |
| Gauntlet Dark Legacy | Arcade / GC / PS2 / Xbox | Beat 'em up | 1999 | 4 | Local | Shared | No | |
| Gauntlet II | Arcade / C64 / ZXS / PS3 / Other | Beat 'em up | 1986 | 4 | Local, Online* | Shared | No | *PS3 version only |
| Gauntlet Legends | DC / N64 / PS1 | Beat 'em up | 1998 | 2 | Local | Shared | No | |
| Gauntlet: Seven Sorrows | PS2 / Xbox | Beat 'em up | 2005 | 4 | Local, Online | Shared | No | |
| Gears of War | PC | TPS | 2007 | 2 | LAN, Online | Full | No | |
| Gears of War | XB360 | TPS | 2006 | 2 | Local, System Link, Xbox Live | Split, Full | No | |
| Gears of War 2 | XB360 | TPS | 2008 | 2 | Local, System Link, Xbox Live | Split, Full | No | *Additional 5-player Horde Mode. |
| Gears of War 3 | XB360 | TPS | 2011 | 2 | Local, System Link, Xbox Live | Split, Full | No | *Additional 5-player Horde Mode and Beast Mode. |
| Gears of War: Judgement | XB360 | TPS | 2013 | 2 | Local, System Link, Xbox Live | Split, Full | No | *Additional 5-player Horde Mode, Beast Mode, OverRun and Free-for-all. |
| Gekido | PS1 | Beat 'em up | 2000 | 2 | Local | Shared | No | |
| General Chaos | GEN | RTS | 1994 | 2 | Local | Shared | No | |
| Geometry Wars: Retro Evolved 2 | XB360* | Shoot 'em up | 2008 | 2 | Local | Shared | No | *XBLA |
| Ghost Pilots | Arcade | Scrolling shooter | 1991 | 2 | Local | Shared | No | |
| Ghost Squad | Wii | Shooter | 2007 | 4 | Local | Shared | No | |
| Ghostbusters: The Video Game | PS3 / XB360 | Action | 2009 | 2 | Online | Full | Yes* | *No SP campaign; limited co-op minigames |
| Ghostbusters: The Video Game | Wii | Action | 2009 | 2 | Local | Split | No | |
| Gladius | PS2 / Xbox / GC | Tactical RPG | 2003 | 2** | Local | Shared | Yes* | *Restrictive 2nd player gameplay: battles only, **up to 4 players on Xbox. |
| Goemon's Great Adventure* | N64 | Platform | 1998 | 2** | Local | Shared | No | *Also known as "Mystical Ninja 2 Starring Goemon". **Unlockable 4-player co-op. |
| Gokujyou Parodius* | Arcade / Saturn / PS1** | Scrolling shooter | 1994 | 2 | Local | Shared | No | *Also known as "Fantastic Journey". **As part of Gokujo Parodius Da! Deluxe Pack |
| Golden Axe | Arcade / GEN / SMS / C64 / Other / PS2*/XB360** | Beat 'em up | 1989 | 2 | Local | Shared | No | *Part of Sega Ages 2500, vol.5 **XBLA |
| Golden Axe II | Arcade / GEN | Beat 'em up | 1991 | 2 | Local | Shared | No | |
| Golden Axe III | GEN | Beat 'em up | 1993 | 2 | Local | Shared | No | |
| Goof Troop | SNES | Action-Adv. | 1993 | 2 | Local | Shared | No | |
| Golden Axe: The Revenge of Death Adder | Arcade | Beat 'em up | 1992 | 4 | Local | Shared | No | |
| Gradius Gaiden | PS1 / PSP | Scrolling shooter | 1997 | 2 | Local | Shared | No(?) | |
| Gradius V | PS2 | Scrolling shooter | 2005 | 2 | Local | Shared | No | |
| Grand Theft Auto: San Andreas | PC / PS2 / Xbox | Action-Adv. | 2004 | 2 | Online*, Local | Full*, Shared | Yes | |
| Grand Theft Auto IV | PC / PS3 / XB360 | Action-Adv. | 2008 | 4 | Online, LAN* | Full | Yes** | |
| Grand Theft Auto V | PS3 / XB360 | Action-Adv. | 2013 | 4 | Online, LAN | Full | Yes | |
| Ground Control II | PC | RTS | 2004 | 3 | LAN, Online | Full | No* | |
| Guardian Heroes | Saturn / XB360 | Beat 'em up | 1996 | 6/12* | Local, Online* | Shared | No | *On Xbox Live Arcade |
| Guerrilla War | Arcade / C64 / NES / ZXS | Shoot 'em up | 1987 | 2 | Local | Shared | No | |
| Guild Wars (series) | PC | Action RPG | 2005+ | 4* | Online | Full | No | *up to 8, depending on an area. Cities act as player hubs, allowing larger player population. |
| Guitar Hero: Aerosmith | PC / PS2 / PS3 / Wii / XB360 | Music | 2008 | 2 | Local | Shared | No* | *No earnings, cutscenes, boss battle. |
| Guitar Hero II | PS2 / XB360 | Music | 2006 | 2 | Local | Shared | No* | *Co-op tiers need to be unlocked through SP. |
| Guitar Hero III | PC / PS2 / PS3 / Wii / XB360 | Music | 2007 | 2 | Local | Shared | No | |
| Guitar Hero World Tour | PS2 / PS3 / Wii / XB360 | Music | 2008 | 4* | Local | Shared | No | *Must own two guitar controllers, one drum controller and a microphone. |
| Guitar Hero 5 | PS2 / PS3 / Wii / XB360 | Music | 2009 | 4** | Local | Shared | No | **Must own specialized controllers. |
| Gunstar Heroes | GEN / PS2* | Shoot 'em up | 1993 | 2 | Local | Shared | No | *Part of Sega Ages 2500, vol.25 |
| Gitaroo Man Lives! | PSP | Music | 2006 | 2 | Local | Full | ? | |
| Gyruss | XB360* | Shoot' em up | 2007 | 2 | Xbox Live | Split | Yes** | *XBLA **Limited "co-op": completely separate side-by-side play with scores combined. |
| Half-Life | PC | FPS | 1998 | 32 | LAN, Online | Full | Yes | SP campaign is co-op playable through third-party mod "svencoop" |
| Half-Life: Decay | PS2 | FPS | 2001 | 2 | Local | Split | Yes* | *Separate storyline campaign for co-op |
| Half-Life 2 | PC | FPS | 2004 | ? | LAN, Online | Full | No* | *SP campaign is co-op playable through third-party mods |
| Halo 2 | Xbox | FPS | 2004 | 2 | Local | Split | No | |
| Halo 3 | XB360 | FPS | 2007 | 2* | Local, System link, Xbox Live | Split, Full | No** | *Up to 4 via Xbox Live or System Link, **Local cooperative presented in 4:3 with an 854x640 resolution instead of 16:9 with 1152x640 |
| Halo 3: ODST | XB360 | FPS | 2009 | 2* | Local, System link, Xbox Live | Split, Full | No** | *Up to 4 via Xbox Live or System Link, **Local cooperative presented in 4:3 with an 854x640 resolution instead of 16:9 with 1152x640 |
| Halo: Combat Evolved | Xbox | FPS | 2001 | 2 | Local | Split | No | |
| Halo: Reach | XB360 | FPS | 2010 | 2* | Local, System link, Xbox Live | Split, Full | No** | *Up to 4 via Xbox Live or System Link, **Local cooperative presented in 4:3 with an 854x720 resolution instead of 16:9 with 1152x720 |
| Halo Wars | XB360 | RTS | 2009 | 2 | Online | Full | No | |
| Harry Potter and the Goblet of Fire | PC / GC / PS2 / Xbox / PSP / DS / GBA | Action-Adv. | 2005 | 3 | Local | Shared | No | *(Handheld)Platform differences may apply |
| Haze | PS3 | FPS | 2008 | 4 | Local, Online | Split, Full | No | |
| Heavenly Guardian | PS2 / Wii | Shoot 'em up | 2007 | 2 | Local | Shared | No* | *2nd player replaces Toto |
| Heavy Barrel | Arcade / NES / PC | Shoot 'em up | 1987 | 2 | Local | Shared | No | |
| Heavy Weapon: Atomic Tank | PC / XB360* | Scrolling shooter | 2007 | 4 | Local, Xbox Live** | Shared | No** | *XBLA **Xbox Live: Survivor Mode, no campaign |
| Hellboy: The Science of Evil | PS3 / XB360 / PSP | Beat 'em up | 2008 | 2 | Local, Online | Split, Full | No | |
| Herc's Adventures | PS1 / Saturn | Action-Adv. | 1997 | 2 | Local | Shared | No | |
| Heretic | PC | FPS | 1994 | 4 | LAN, Online(?) | Full | No | |
| Heretic II | PC | TPS | 1998 | 4 | LAN, Online | Full | No | |
| Hexen | PC | FPS | 1995 | 4 | LAN, Online | Full | No | |
| Hexen | N64 | FPS | 1997 | 2 | Local | Split | No | |
| Hexen II | PC | FPS | 1997 | 4 | LAN, Online | Full | No | |
| Hexplore | PC | RPG | 1998 | 4 | LAN(?) | ? | No | |
| Hidden & Dangerous | PC | Tactical TPS | 1999 | 4 | LAN, Online | Full | No | |
| Hidden & Dangerous 2: Sabre Squadron | PC | Tactical TPS | 2004 | 6 | LAN, Online | Full | No | Co-op mode is available in expansion only - All single player missions HD2 + HD2:SS in co-op mode with mods "CMP (Coop Map Package)" |
| Hired Guns | Amiga | FPS | 1993 | 4 | Local | Shared | No | |
| The House of the Dead 2 | Arcade / PC / DC | Shooter | 1998 | 2 | Local | Shared | No | |
| House of the Dead III, The | PC | Shooter | 2002 | 2 | Local | Shared | No | |
| House of the Dead 4, The | Arcade | Shooter | 2005 | 2 | Local | Shared | No | |
| House of the Dead, The | PC | Shooter | 1996 | | Local | Shared | | |
| House of the Dead 2 & 3 Return, The | Wii | Shooter | 2008 | 2 | Local | Shared | No | |
| Hunter: The Reckoning | GC / Xbox | Action | 2002 | 4 | Local | Shared | No | |
| Hunted: The Demon's Forge | PC / Xbox 360 / PS3 | Action | 2011 | 2 | Local, Xbox Live, System Link | Shared | No | |
| Hunter: The Reckoning Redeemer | XB360 | Beat 'em up | 2003 | 4 | Local | Shared | No | |
| Hunter: The Reckoning Wayward | PS2 | Beat 'em up | 2003 | 2 | Local | Shared | No | |
| Ibara | PS2 / Arcade | Scrolling shooter | 2005 | 2 | Local | Shared | No | |
| ibb & obb | PS3, PC, Switch | Puzzle / Platform | 2013 | 2 | Local, Online | Shared | | |
| Ice Climber | Arcade / NES / Others | Platform | 1984* | 2 | Local | Shared | Yes | *Numerous versions, see the main page |
| Icewind Dale | PC | RPG | 2000 | 6 | LAN, Online | Full | No | |
| Icewind Dale II | PC | RPG | 2002 | 6 | LAN, Online | Full | No | |
| Ikari Warriors | NES / Other | Shoot 'em up | 1986 | 2 | Local | Shared | No | |
| Ikaruga | DC / GC / XB360* | Scrolling shooter | 2003 | 2 | Local, System Link**, Xbox Live** | Shared | No | *XBLA **XB360 version only |
| IL-2 Sturmovik: 1946 | PC | Combat flight simulator | 2007 | 80 | LAN, Online | Full | No* | * All campaigns / careers support cooperative multiplayer. |
| The Incredibles: Rise of the Underminer | PC / PS2 / Xbox / GC / DS / GBA | Action | 2005 | 2 | Local* | Shared* | No* | *Platform differences may apply |
| Iron Brigade | XB360 | TPS | 2011 | 4 | Online | Full | No | |
| J.R.R. Tolkien's The Lord of the Rings, Vol. I | SNES, Other | Action RPG | 1994 | 5 | Local | Shared | No | SNES version only; multitap required for 3+ players |
| Jackal | NES / Other | Shoot 'em up | 1986 | 2 | Local | Shared | No | |
| James Bond 007: Everything or Nothing | GC / PS2 / Xbox | TPS | 2004 | 2 | Local, Online* | Split, Full* | Yes** | *Online play: PS2 version only. **No SP campaign: separate co-op missions. |
| Jamestown | PC | Shoot 'em up | 2011 | 4 | Local | Shared | No | Accepts multiple keyboards/mice as individual player inputs |
| Jazz Jackrabbit 2 | PC | Shoot 'em up | 1998 | 4 | Local | Split | No | |
| Jet Force Gemini | N64 | TPS | 1999 | 2 | Local | | | |
| Jikkyō Oshaberi Parodius | PS1 / Saturn | Scrolling shooter | 1995 | 2 | Local | Shared | No | Other platforms: no co-op or turn-based |
| Joint Operations: Typhoon Rising | PC | FPS | 2004 | | LAN, Online | Full | No | |
| Joint Task Force | PC | RTS | 2006 | | LAN, Online | Full | | |
| Joust | Arcade / PC / GC / PlayStation 2 / Xbox / PS3 / PS1*/XB360** | Platform | 1982 | 2 | Local, Online*** | Shared | No | *Part of Midway Arcade Treasures. **PSN / XBLA ***PS3 and Xbox 360 versions only |
| Judge Dredd: Dredd Vs. Death | PS2 / PC / Xbox | FPS / Sci-Fi | 2003 | | LAN, Online | Shared | No | |
| Justice League Heroes | PS2 / Xbox | Action RPG | 2006 | 2 | Local | Shared | No | |
| Kameo: Elements of Power | XB360 | Action-Adv. | 2005 | 2 | Local | Split | Yes* | *Have to complete SP to unlock co-op; some levels are SP only. |
| Kane & Lynch: Dead Men | PC / PS3 / XB360 | TPS | 2007 | 2 | Local | Split | No* | *Requires a 360 controller for PC co-op |
| Kane & Lynch: Dog Days | PC / PS3 / XB360 | TPS | 2010 | 2 | Local | Split | No* | |
| Keep Talking and Nobody Explodes | PC, Xbox One, PS4, Switch, Android, iOS | Puzzle | 2015 | 2 | Local, Online | Full | N/A | * This game was designed specifically for co-op play. |
| Killing Floor | PC | FPS | 2009 | 6* | LAN, Online | Full | No | *Can be modified to include up to and more than 100 players. |
| Killzone: Liberation | PSP | FPS | 2006 | 2 | Local | Shared | No* | *Have to complete mission in SP to get it co-op unlocked |
| Kingdom Under Fire: Circle of Doom | XB360 | Action RPG | 2007 | 4 | Xbox Live | Full | No | |
| Kirby Super Star | SNES | Platform | 1996 | 2 | Local | Shared | No | |
| Kirby's Dream Land 3 | SNES | Platform | 1997 | 2 | Local | Shared | No | |
| Knights of the Round | Arcade / SNES / PS2* | Beat 'em up | 1991 | 2** | Local | Shared | No | *Part of Capcom Classics Collection Vol.2. **Up to 3 in arcade version |
| Kung Fu Panda | PC / PS2 / PS3 / XB360 / Wii | Action | 2008 | 2 | ? | ? | Yes* | *No SP campaign. Limited co-op mode unlockable through SP |
| Lara Croft and the Guardian of Light | PC / PS3 / XB360 | Action | 2010 | 2 | Local | Shared | No | |
| Last Resort | Arcade / PS2 / PSP / Wii* | Scrolling shooter | 1992 | 2 | Local | Shared | No | *As part of SNK Arcade Classics Vol. 1 |
| Left 4 Dead | PC | FPS | 2008 | 4 | LAN, Online | Full | No | Downloadable maps, campaigns. |
| Left 4 Dead | XB360 | FPS | 2008 | 2* | Local, System Link, Xbox Live | Split, Full | No | *Up to 4 online |
| Left 4 Dead 2 | PC | FPS | 2009 | 4 | LAN, Online | Full | No | Downloadable maps, campaigns. |
| Left 4 Dead 2 | XB360 | FPS | 2009 | 2* | Local, System Link, Xbox Live | Split, Full | No | *Up to 4 online |
| Legend of Spyro: Dawn of the Dragon, The | PS2 / PS3 / XB360 / DS / Wii | Action | 2008 | 2 | Local | Shared | No | |
| Legend of the Mystical Ninja | SNES / GBA | Platform | 1991 | 2 | Local | Shared | No | |
| Legend of Zelda: Four Swords Adventures, The | GC | Action-Adv. | 2004 | 4 | Local* | Full | No | *requires each player to have a GBA |
| Legendary Wings | Arcade / NES | Scrolling shooter | 1986 | 2 | Local | Shared | No | |
| Lego Batman | PC / PS2 / PS3 / XB360 / Wii / PSP / DS | Action-Adv. | 2008 | 2 | Local, Online | Shared | No | (Handheld)Platform differences may apply. |
| Lego Indiana Jones: The Original Adventures | PC / PS2 / PS3 / XB360 / Wii / PSP / DS | Action-Adv. | 2008 | 2 | Local* | Shared | No | *(Handheld)Platform differences may apply |
| Lego Star Wars III: The Clone Wars | PS3 / XB360 / DS / Wii / PC / 3DS / PSP | Action-Adv. | 2011 | 2 | Local | Shared | No | *(Handheld)Platform differences may apply |
| Lego Indiana Jones 2: The Adventure Continues | PS3 / XB360 / DS / Wii / PC / 3DS / PSP | Action-Adv. | 2011 | 2 | Local | Shared | No | *(Handheld)Platform Differences Apply |
| Lego Star Wars: The Complete Saga | PS3 / XB360 / DS / Wii | Action-Adv. | 2007 | 2 | Local*, XboxLive | Shared, Split, Full | No | *Platform differences apply |
| Lego Star Wars II: The Original Trilogy | PC / PS2 / Xbox / XB360 / PSP / DS / GBA / GC | Action-Adv. | 2006 | 2 | Local | Shared | No* | *(Handheld)Platform differences may apply |
| Lego Star Wars: The Video Game | PC / PS2 / Xbox / GC / GBA | Action-Adv. | 2006 | 2 | Local | Shared | No | *(Handheld)Platform differences may apply |
| Lethal Company | PC | Horror | 2023 | 4 | Local, Online | Full | | |
| Life Force | Arcade / NES / Other / PS1 / Saturn* | Scrolling shooter | 1986 | 2 | Local | Shared | No | *Part of Salamander Deluxe Pack Plus |
| LittleBigPlanet | PS3 | Platform | 2008 | 4 | Local, Online | Shared | No | |
| LittleBigPlanet 2 | PS3 | Platform | 2011 | 4 | Local, Online | Shared | No | |
| Lode Runner | XB360* | Platform | 2009 | 2 | Local, Xbox Live | Shared | No** | *XBLA **Separate, comparable Co-op Journey and Co-op Puzzle campaigns. |
| Lode Runner 2 | PC | Platform | 1998 | | | | Yes* | *Separate co-op levels |
| Loki | PC | Action RPG | 2007 | 6 | LAN, Online | Full | No | |
| Looney Tunes: Acme Arsenal | PS2 / XB360 / Wii | Beat 'em up | 2007 | 2 | Local, Xbox Live* | Split, Full* | No | *Online co-op: Xbox 360 only |
| Looney Tunes B-Ball | SNES | Sports | 1995 | 4 | Local | Shared, Full | No | |
| The Lord of the Rings: Conquest | PC / PS3 / XB360 | Action-Adv. | 2009 | 4 | Local, Online | Shared, Full | No | |
| Lord of the Rings: The Return of the King, The | PC / PS2 / Xbox / GC | Beat 'em up | 2003 | 2 | Local, Online* | Shared | No | *PS2 version only. |
| Lost Planet 2 | PC / PS3 / XB360 | TPS | 2010 | 4 | Local, Online | Split, Full | No | |
| Lost Vikings, The | Amiga / Amiga CD32 / Game Boy Advance / MS-DOS / Sega Mega Drive / SNES / PlayStation | puzzle-platform game | 1992 | 2 (3 only on Mega Drive) | Local | Full | Yes | Only one player has the focus (which can be switched) and the other player loses control when going off-screen (having to wait for the first player to either switch focus or come to the same place) |
| Lost Vikings 2, The | Super NES / MS-DOS / Windows / Saturn / PlayStation / Switch / PlayStation 4 / Xbox One | puzzle-platform game | 1997 | 2 | Local | Full | Yes | Only one player has the focus (which can be switched) and the other player loses control when going off-screen (having to wait for the first player to either switch focus or come to the same place) |
| Lovers in a Dangerous Spacetime | PC / MAC / Linux / PS3 / Xbox One | Arcade | 2015 | 4 | Local | Split | No | |
| Madden NFL (series) | * | Sports | 1988+* | * | * | Shared, Full | No | *Numerous versions, see the main page |
| Mage Arena | PC | Action | 2025 (early access) | * | Online | Full | | |
| Magic Ball | PS3 | Puzzle | 2009 | 2 | Local, Online | Shared | No | |
| Magic: The Gathering - Duels of the Planeswalkers 2012 | PC | Collectible card game | 2011 | 4* | Online | Full | No | *2v2xAI or 3v1xAI in coop mode |
| Magicka | PC | Action-Adv. | 2011 | 4 | Local, LAN, Online | Full | No | |
| Marathon 2: Durandal | PC | FPS | 1995 | 8(?) | LAN | Full | Yes(?) | |
| Marathon 2: Durandal | XB360* | FPS | 2008 | 4** | Local, Xbox Live | Split, Full | ? | *XBLA **Up to 8 through Xbox Live |
| Marathon Infinity | PC | FPS | 1996 | 8(?) | LAN, Online | Full | No(?) | |
| Marble Madness | Arcade / NES / SMS / GEN / Other | Platform / Racing | 1984 | 2 | Local | Full | No | |
| Mario Bros. | Arcade / NES / Others | Platform | 1983* | 2 | Local | Shared | No | *Numerous versions, see the main page. |
| Mario Kart: Double Dash | GC | Racing | 2003 | 2* | Local | Split, Full* | No** | *Two control a single kart (P1 drives, P2 uses items, players can swap); up to 2 karts. **No Time Trial. |
| Mario Kart Wii | Wii | Racing | 2008 | 4 | Local, Online | Split | Yes | *Can play on same team in red vs. blue races or battles. Grand Prix and Time Trials not available. New Vehicles/Characters can only be unlocked in single player. |
| Mario Kart 8 | Wii U | Racing | 2014 | 4 | Local, Online | Split | Yes | *Can play on same team in red vs. blue races or battles. Grand Prix and Time Trials not available. New Vehicles/Characters can be unlocked. |
| Marvel: Ultimate Alliance | PS2 / PS3 / Wii / XB360 / PSP | Action RPG | 2006 | 4 | Local, LAN, Online* | Shared | No | *Wii version: local co-op only. |
| Marvel: Ultimate Alliance 2 | PS2 / PS3 / Wii / XB360 / PSP / DS | Action RPG | 2009 | 4** | Local, LAN, Online** | Shared | No | **Platform differences may apply |
| MechWarrior 4 (expansion 1)(expansion 2) | PC | Mecha Sim | 2000 | 5 | LAN, Online | Full | No* | *SP campaign is co-op playable through third-party mods |
| Medal of Honor: Rising Sun | GC / PS2 / Xbox | FPS | 2003 | 4 | Local | Split | No | |
| MegaGlest | PC | RTS | 2010 | 2-8 | LAN, Online | Full | No | |
| Mega SWIV | GEN | Shoot 'em up | 1992 | 2 | Local | Shared | No | |
| Men of War | PC | RTS | 2009 | ? | LAN, Online | Full | No(?) | |
| Mendel Palace | NES | Action | 1989 | 2 | Local | Shared | No | |
| Mercenaries 2: World in Flames | PC / PS2 / PS3 / XB360 | Action-Adv. | 2008 | 2 | Online | Full | No | |
| Metal Gear Solid: Peace Walker | PSP / PS3 / XB360 | Stealth | 2010 | 2-4, depending on mission | Ad-hoc, online* | Full | No** | *Ad-hoc is only on PSP, PSP version requires Adhoc Party or XLink Kai to play online. **A small amount of missions are not playable in co-op. |
| Metal Slug (series) | * | Shoot 'em up | 1996-2008 | 2 | Local | Shared | No | *Numerous versions, see the main page |
| Michael Jackson's Moonwalker | Arcade | Beat 'em up | 1990 | 3 | Local | Full | No | |
| Mighty Morphin Power Rangers | SNES / GEN | Beat 'em up | 1995 | 2 | Local | Shared | No | |
| Millennium Soldier: Expendable | PC / DC / PS1 | Shoot 'em up | 1998 | 2 | Local | Shared | No | |
| Minecraft | PC | Sandbox | 2011 | 2-255* | Online, LAN | Full | No | *The maximum number of players depends on the server |
| Minecraft: Xbox 360 Edition | XB360 | Sandbox | 2012 | 2-8* | Online, Local | Full, Split | No | *Local max is 4 and online is 8 |
| Mission Against Terror | PC | FPS | 2011 | 2-16 | Online | Full | No | |
| Monster Hunter | PS2 | Action RPG | 2004 | 4 | Online | Full | No | |
| Monster Hunter Tri | Wii | Action RPG | 2010 | 4–5 | WFC, Local | Split, Full | No | |
| Monster Hunter Freedom | PSP | Action RPG | 2005 | 4 | Ad-hoc, online* | Full | No** | *Ad-hoc is only on PSP, online is required Adhoc Party or XLink Kai. **Most of SP, additional co-op specific content |
| Monster Madness: Battle for Suburbia | PC / XB360 | Shoot 'em up | 2007 | 4 | Local | Shared | No | |
| Monster Madness: Grave Danger | PS3 | Shoot 'em up | 2008 | 4 | Local, Online | Shared | No | |
| Monsters vs. Aliens | PS3 / XB360 / DS / Wii | Action | 2009 | 2 | Local | Shared | No* | *Limited co-op: P2 assists P1 with a reticle. |
| Moria | PLATO | Early RPG | 1975 | 10 | Online | Full | No | |
| Mortal Kombat: Shaolin Monks | PS2 / Xbox | Beat 'em up | 2005 | 2 | Local | Shared | No | |
| Mortimer Beckett and the Secrets of Spooky Manor | Wii* | Puzzle | 2008 | 4 | Local | Shared | No | |
| Moving Out | PC, Xbox One, PS4, Switch | Action | 2020 | 2-4 | Local | Full | N/A | * Main campaign was designed specifically for 2-player cooperative play, singleplayer is essentially "co-op campaign with less items". |
| Mutant Storm Empire | XB360* | Scrolling shooter | 2007 | 2 | Local, Xbox Live | Split, Shared | No | |
| Mystical Ninja 2 Starring Goemon | N64 | Platform | 1998 | 2 | Local | Shared | No | |
| Myth II | PC | RTS | 1998 | ? | LAN, Online | Full | No* | *SP units are shared between players.(?) Downloadable co-op maps |
| Myth III: The Wolf Age | PC | RTS | 2001 | ? | LAN, Online | Full | No(?) | |
| Naruto: Uzumaki Chronicles 2 | PS2 | Beat 'em up | 2006 | 2 | Local | Shared | No* | *Restricting camera issues; several (not many) missions are SP only. |
| Nation Red | PC | Action | 2009 | | Local, Online | Full | | |
| NBA Live (series) | * | Sports | 1994+* | * | * | Shared, Full | No | *Numerous versions, see the main page |
| Neo Contra | PS2 | Shoot 'em up | 2004 | 2 | Local | Shared | No | |
| Nerf N-Strike | Wii | Shooter | 2008 | 4 | Local | Shared | Yes* | *No SP Campaign; separate co-op modes. |
| Neverwinter Nights | PC | RPG | 2002 | 4 | LAN, Online | Full | No | |
| Neverwinter Nights 2 (expansions 1, 2, 3) | PC | RPG | 2006 | 4 | LAN, Internet | Full | No | |
| New Super Luigi U | Wii U | Platform | 2013 | 5 | Local | Shared | No | Available as a retail copy or as a DLC for New Super Mario Bros. U |
| New Super Mario Bros. 2 | N3DS | Platform | 2012 | 2 | Local | Shared | No | |
| New Super Mario Bros. U | Wii U | Platform | 2012 | 5 | Local | Shared | No | |
| New Super Mario Bros. Wii | Wii | Platform | 2009 | 4 | Local | Shared | No | |
| NHL (series) | * | Sports | 1991+* | * | * | Shared, Full | No | *Numerous versions, see the main page |
| Nickelodeon Kart Racers | Nintendo Switch, PlayStation 4, Xbox One | Racing | 2018 | 2* | Local | Splitscreen | | *Two players per team. Once both teammates collect a hammer, they can use it to stop every other team and get an advantage. |
| Nicktoons Unite! | GC / PS2 / DS / GBA | Adventure | 2005 | 4 | Local | Shared | | Platform differences apply |
| A Nightmare on Elm Street | NES | Platform | 1989 | 4 | Local | Shared | No | multitap required for 3+ players |
| Ninja Baseball Bat Man | Arcade | Beat 'em up | 1993 | 2 | Local | Shared | No | |
| Ninja Crusaders | NES | Beat 'em up | 1990 | 2 | Local | Shared | No | |
| Ninja Gaiden | Arcade | Beat 'em up | 1988 | 2 | Local | Shared | No | |
| Ninja Gaiden Sigma 2 | PS3 | Beat 'em up | 2009 | 2 | Online | Full | Yes** | **30 challenge missions; No SP campaign. |
| No One Lives Forever 2: A Spy in H.A.R.M.'s Way | PC | FPS | 2002 | 4 | LAN, Online | Full | Yes* | *Derivative co-op missions. Full Single player Co-op support through community Mods via Unity HQ website. |
| Nox | PC | Action RPG | 2000 | 6 | LAN, Online | Full | Yes* | *No SP campaign: separate, comparable co-op content available through free "Nox Quest Add-on Pack". |
| Onechanbara: Bikini Samurai Squad | XB360 | Beat 'em up | 2009 | 2 | Local | Split | No* | *5 of the 20 missions are SP only in Story Mode; 4 of them can later be played cooperatively in Freeplay. |
| OneChanbara: Bikini Zombie Slayers | Wii | Beat 'em up | 2009 | 2 | Local | Split | No | |
| ObsCure | PC / PS2 / Xbox | Action-Adv. | 2004 | 2 | Local | Shared | No* | *Certain 2nd player limitations |
| Obscure: The Aftermath | PC / PS2 / Wii | Action-Adv. | 2008 | 2 | Local | Shared | No | |
| Omega Five | XB360* | Scrolling shooter | 2008 | 2 | Local | Shared | No | *XBLA |
| Onslaught | Wii | FPS | 2009 | 4 | Online | Full | No(?) | |
| OpenTTD | PC / Other | Sim | 2007 | 8* | LAN, Online | Full | No | Max 8 companies, run singlehandedly or cooperatively. |
| Operation: Blockade | PC / Arcade | FPS | 2002 | 4 | LAN, Online | Full | Yes | Requires IPX |
| Operation Flashpoint: Cold War Crisis | PC | Tactical FPS | 2001 | ? | LAN, Online | Full | Yes | |
| Operation Flashpoint: Dragon Rising | PC / PS3 / XB360 | Tactical FPS | 2009 | 4* | LAN, Online | Full | Yes | *Main campaign and some other missions playable with 4 players on PC. |
| Operation Flashpoint: Red River | PC / PS3 / XB360 | Tactical FPS | 2011 | 4* | LAN, Online | Full | Yes | *Main campaign and some other missions playable with 4 players on PC. |
| Operation Darkness | XB360 | Tactical RPG | 2008 | 4 | Xbox Live | Full | No | |
| Outfit, The | XB360 | TPS | 2006 | 2 | Local, System Link, Xbox Live | Split, Full(?) | No | |
| Orcs Must Die! | PC | Tower defense/Action | 2011 | 2 | | | | |
| Orcs Must Die! 2 | PC | Tower defense/Action | 2012 | 2 | | | | |
| Out of Space | PC / PS4 | Arcade | 2020 | 4 | Local | Full | N/A | |
| Overcooked | PC, PS4, Xbox One, Switch | Arcade | 2016 | 4 | Local | Full | N/A | * Main campaign was designed specifically for 2-player cooperative play, singleplayer is essentially "one player controls both characters". |
| Path of Exile | PC | Action RPG | 2013 | 6 | | | | |
| Payday 2 | PC | FPS | 2013 | 4 | Online | Full | No | |
| Peace Keepers, The* | SNES | Beat 'em up | 1993 | 2 | Local | Shared | No | *Also known as "Rushing Beat Syura"; 3rd game in the Rushing Beat series |
| Perfect Dark | N64 | FPS | 2000 | 4 | Local | Split | No | |
| Perfect Dark Zero | XB360 | FPS | 2005 | 2 | Local, System Link, Xbox Live | Split, Full | No | |
| Phantasy Star Online Episode I & II | GC / Xbox | Action RPG | 2002 | 4 | Local/Xbox Live | Split, Full(?) | ? | Xbox Live GamerTag required for Xbox offline play |
| Pikmin 2 | GC | RTS | 2004 | 2 | Local | Split | Yes* | Campaign not available, only Challenge Mode. |
| Pico Park | Windows | Puzzle video game | 2016 | 2-8 | Online | No | | |
| Pirates of the Caribbean: The Legend of Jack Sparrow | PC / PS2 | Beat 'em up | 2006 | 2 | Local | Shared | No | |
| PixelJunk Eden | PS3 | RTS | 2008 | 3 | Local | Shared | No | |
| PixelJunk Monsters | PS3 | RTS | 2008 | 2 | Local | Shared | No | |
| PixelJunk Shooter | PS3 | Puzzle | 2009* | 2 | Local | Shared | ? | *Currently in development |
| Pocky & Rocky | SNES | Scrolling shooter | 1993 | 2 | Local | Shared | No | |
| Pocky & Rocky 2 | SNES | Scrolling shooter | 1994 | 2 | Local | Shared | No | |
| Portal 2 | Windows / Linux / macOS / PS3 / XB360 / Nintendo Switch | Puzzle / Action | 2011 | 2 | Local, Steam | Split, Full | Yes* | *The Co-op campaign is not the single-player one but the length is similar and it continues the storyline. |
| Power Stone 2 | DC / PSP | Fighter | 2000 | 4 | Local | Full | Yes* | *No Adventure mode |
| Progear | Arcade | Shoot 'em up | 2001 | 2 | Local | Shared | No | |
| Project Eden | PC | Action | 2001 | 4 | LAN, Online | Full | No | |
| Project Eden | PS2 | Action | 2001 | 4 | Local | Split | No | |
| Psi-Ops: The Mindgate Conspiracy | PS2 | TPS | 2004 | 2 | Local | Shared | Yes* | Co-op unlockable: 1st player controls movement, 2nd - weapons. |
| Punisher, The | Arcade / GEN | Beat 'em up | 1993 | 2 | Local | Shared | No | |
| Quake (expansions 1,2) | PC | FPS | 1996 | 4(?) | LAN, Online | Full | No | |
| Quake II | PC | FPS | 1997 | 4(?) | LAN, Online | Full | No* | *Cooperative multiplayer patch required |
| Raiden Fighters Aces | XB360 | Arcade | 2008 | 2 | Local | Shared | No | |
| Rampage | Arcade / NES / SMS / Other / PC / GC / PS2 / Xbox* | Action | 1986 | 2** | Local | Full | No | *As part of Midway Arcade Treasures **Up to 3 in Arcade version |
| Rampage World Tour | Arcade / N64 / PS1 / Saturn / GC / PS2 / Xbox* | Action | 1997 | 2** | Local | Full | No | *As part of Midway Arcade Treasures 2 **Up to 3 in Arcade and some other versions |
| Rampage: Total Destruction | GC / PS2 / Wii | Action | 2006 | 3 | Local | Full | No | |
| Ratchet: Deadlocked | PS2 | Action | 2005 | 2 | Local | Split | No(?) | |
| Rec Room | PC / PS4 | FPS / Action RPG | 2016 | 2-4* | Online | Full | | *No more than 4 players can cooperate in each team. |
| RecWar | PC | TPS | 2002 | 2/4* | Local, LAN** | Split, Full** | No | *4 players on LAN only **Simultaneous split-screen and LAN play possible. |
| Red Star, The | PS2 | Shoot 'em up | 2007 | 2 | Local | Shared | No | |
| Red Dead Redemption | PS3 / XB360 | Action-Adv. | 2010 | 4 | Online | Full | Yes | Originally the game comes without coop missions, which must be downloaded them on PSN or Xbox live. |
| Red Rope: Don't Fall Behind | PC | Puzzle-Adv. | 2016 | 2 | Local | Full | No | |
| Resident Evil 5 | PS3 / XB360 | Action-Adv. | 2009 | 2 | Local, Online | Split | No | Player 2 must press play during player 1 campaign to join in split-screen (offline) |
| Resident Evil 5 | PC | Action-Adv. | 2009 | 2 | Online | Full | No | |
| Resident Evil 6 | PS3 / XB360 | Action-Adv. | 2012 | 2 | Local, Online | Split | No | Player 2 must press play during player 1 campaign to join in split-screen (offline) |
| Resident Evil Outbreak | PS2 | Action-Adv. | 2003 | 4 | Online | Full | No | Alternate Online play possible via Japanese edition titled "Biohazard Outbreak" for proxy IP connect see fansite "obsrv.org" for details. |
| Resident Evil Outbreak File #2 | PS2 | Action-Adv. | 2006 | 4 | Online | Full | No | Alternate Online play possible via Japanese edition titled "Biohazard Outbreak File 2" for proxy IP connect see fansite "obsrv.org" for details. |
| Resident Evil: The Umbrella Chronicles | Wii | Shooter | 2007 | 2 | Local | Shared | No* | *Sub-chapter co-op is unlocked through SP; several levels are SP only. |
| Resistance: Fall of Man | PS3 | FPS | 2006 | 2 | Local | Split | No | |
| Resistance 2 | PS3 | FPS | 2008 | 8 | Local, Online | Split, Full* | Yes** | *Simultaneous split-screen and LAN play possible. **No SP campaign; separate co-op mode. |
| Restricted Area | PC | Action RPG | 2005 | 2 | LAN, Online | Full | Yes* | *Generic side missions only |
| Return to Castle Wolfenstein: Tides of War | Xbox | FPS | 2003 | 2 | Local | Split | Yes* | *Levels have to be unlocked in SP first; no saves |
| Rival Turf!* | SNES | Beat 'em up | 1993 | 2 | Local | Shared | No | *Also known as "Rushing Beat"; 1st game in the Rushing Beat series |
| River City Ransom* | NES / GBA | Beat 'em up | 1989 | 2 | Local | Shared | No | *Also known as "Downtown Nekketsu Monogatari" or "Street Gangs". |
| Road Rash: Jailbreak | PS1 / GBA | Car Combat | 1999* | 2 | Local | Shared | No** | *Released for PlayStation only in US (1999) and EU (2000). Released for GBA in 2003, only in EU and US. **Player 2 controls the sidecar and weapon while Player 1 drives the motorcycle. This mode is available in the GBA as well using two GBA consoles. |
| RoboCop 2 | Arcade | Shoot 'em up | 1991 | 2 | Local | Shared | No | |
| Rock Band | PS2 / PS3 / XB360 | Music | 2007 | 4* | Local | Shared | No** | *Must own two guitars, drums, microphone. **PS2 co-op is limited: no Band World Tour mode |
| Rock Band 2 | PS3 / XB360 / Wii | Music | 2008 | 4* | Local, Online | Shared | No | *Must own two guitar controllers, one drum controller and a microphone. |
| Rocketmen: Axis of Evil | PS3 / XB360* | Beat 'em up | 2008 | 4 | Local, Online | Shared | No | *PSN / XBLA |
| Rogue Trooper (video game) | PC | TPS | 2006 | 4 | LAN, Online | Full | Yes* | *SP campaign not available; 5 separate co-op levels. |
| Rogue Trooper (video game) | PS2 / Xbox / Wii | TPS | 2006 | 2-4* | Local, LAN, Online | Split, Full | Yes** | *Up to 4 players online PS2 & Xbox. Xbox System link 2+2. Wii 4P splitscreen. **No SP campaign: 5 separate co-op levels. |
| Rohga: Armor Force | Arcade / Saturn | Platform | 1994 | 2 | Local | ? | No | |
| Rumble Racing | PS2 | Racing | 2004 | 2 | Local | Shared | No(?) | |
| Roots of Pacha | PC | Life simulation | 2023 | 4 | Online | Full | No(?) | |
| Rune | PC | Action-Adv. | 2000 | 4 | Online | Full | Yes* | *Requires 1.07 patch and third-party "Rune Co-Op" mod |
| R-Type Dimensions | XB360* | Scrolling shooter | 2009 | 2 | Local, Xbox Live | Shared | No | *XBLA |
| R-Type Leo | Arcade | Scrolling shooter | 1997 | 2 | Local | Shared | No | |
| Sacred | PC | Action RPG | 2004 | 4 | LAN, Online | Full | No | |
| Sacred 2: Fallen Angel | PC | Action RPG | 2008 | 16 | LAN, Online | Full | No | |
| Sacred 2: Fallen Angel | PS3 / XB360 | Action RPG | 2009 | 2* | Local, Online | Shared, Full | No | *Up to 4 online. Simultaneous split-screen and LAN play possible. |
| Saints Row 2 | PC / PS3 / XB360 | Action-Adv. | 2008 | 2 | LAN, Online | Full | No | |
| Saints Row The Third | PC / PS3 / XB360 | Action-Adv. | 2011 | 2 | LAN, Online | Full | No | |
| Saints Row IV | PC / PS3 / XB360/PS4/XBO | Action-Adv. | 2013 | 2 | LAN, Online | Full | No | |
| Salamander | Arcade / NES / Other / PS1 / Saturn* | Scrolling shooter | 1986 | 2 | Local | Shared | No | *Part of Salamander Deluxe Pack Plus |
| Salamander 2 | Arcade / PS1 / Saturn* | Scrolling shooter | 1996 | 2 | Local | Shared | No | *Part of Salamander Deluxe Pack Plus |
| Samurai Warriors (expansion 1) | PS2 / Xbox | Beat 'em up | 2004 | 2 | Local | Split | No(?) | |
| Samurai Warriors 2 (expansions) | PS2 / XB360 | Beat 'em up | 2006 | 2 | Local | Split | No(?) | |
| Samurai Warriors 2 | PC | Beat 'em up | 2008 | 2 | Local | Split | No | |
| Saturn Bomberman | Sega Saturn | Action | 1997 | 2-10 | Local | Full | | Supports 10 players with 2 multitaps or 7 players with just one multitap |
| Schizoid | XB360* | Action | 2008 | 2 | Local, Xbox Live | Shared | No | *XBLA |
| The Scourge Project: Episode 1 and 2 | PC / XB360 / PS3 | Tactical TPS | 2010 | 4 | LAN, Online | Full | No | |
| Scud: The Disposable Assassin | Saturn | Shoot 'em up | 1997 | 2 | Local | Shared | ? | |
| Secret of Mana | SNES | Action RPG | 1993 | 3 | Local | Shared | No | |
| Seiken Densetsu 3 | SNES | jRPG | 1995 | 2* | Local | Shared | No | *Up to 3 with a ROM patch |
| Sengoku I, II, III | Arcade | Beat 'em up | 1991* | 2 | Local | Shared | No | *II — 1995, III — 2001 |
| Serious Sam | PC | FPS | 2001 | 16 | Local, LAN, Online* | Split, Full* | No | *Simultaneous split-screen and LAN play possible. |
| Serious Sam II | PC / Xbox | FPS | 2005 | 16* | LAN, Online, Xbox Live | Full | No | *4 on Xbox |
| Sexy video Parodius | Arcade / Saturn / PS1 | Scrolling shooter | 1996 | 2 | Local | Shared | No | |
| Shadow Warrior | PC | FPS | 1997 | ? | LAN, Online(?) | Full | ? | |
| Shadow the Hedgehog | PS2 / Xbox / GC | Action | 2005 | 2 | Local | Shared | Yes* | *Severe 2nd player limitations |
| Shadowgrounds | PC | Shoot 'em up | 2006 | 4 | Local | Shared | No | |
| Shadowgrounds Survivor | PC | Shoot 'em up | 2007 | 4 | Local | Shared | No | |
| Shank | PC / PS3 / XB360 | Beat 'em up | 2010 | 2 | Local | Shared | Yes | |
| Shining Soul II | GBA | Action RPG | 2004 | 4 | Local | Full | No* | *Bonus co-op content |
| Shining Tears | PS2 | jRPG | 2005 | 2 | Local | Shared | Yes* | *2nd Player: battle control only |
| Shock Troopers | Arcade | Shoot 'em up | 1997 | 2 | Local | Shared | No | |
| Shock Troopers: 2nd Squad | Arcade | Shoot 'em up | 1999 | 2 | Local | Shared | No | |
| Shrek 2 | GC / Xbox / PS2 | Action | 2004 | 4 | Local | | | |
| Silent Scope 2: Dark Silhouette | Arcade / PS2 | Shooter | 2000 | 2 | Local | Shared | No | |
| Silkworm | Amiga / NES | Scrolling shooter | 1988 | 2 | Local | Shared | No | |
| Silverfall | PC | Action RPG | 2007 | 8 | LAN, Online | Full | No* | *No introduction |
| Simpsons, The | Arcade | Beat 'em up | 1991 | 4 | Local | Shared | No(?) | |
| Simpsons Game, The | PS2 / PS3 / XB360 / Wii | Platform | 2007 | 2 | Local | Split | No | |
| Sims, The | PS2 / Xbox / GC | God | 2003 | 2 | Local | Split | ? | The story mode is not available for coop. |
| Sims 2, The | PS2 / Xbox / GC | God | 2003 | 2 | Local | Split | ? | |
| Shoot Many Robots | PC | Shooter / RPG | 2012 | 4 | Online | Full | | |
| Skull Fang | Arcade / Saturn | Scrolling shooter | 1996 | 2 | Local | Shared | No | |
| Sky Kid | Arcade / NES | Scrolling shooter | 1985 | 2 | Local | Shared | No | |
| Smash TV* | Arcade / NES / GEN / SNES / Other / XB360** | Shoot' em up | 1990 | 2 | Local, Xbox Live | Shared | No | *"Super Smash TV" on GEN and SNES. **XBLA |
| Snake Rattle 'n' Roll | NES | | 1990 | 2 | Local | Shared | | |
| Sniper Elite | PS2 / Xbox / PC | Tactical TPS | 2005 | 2 | LAN, Local | Split-Full* | No | *Depending on Platform |
| Snipperclips | Switch | Puzzle | 2017 | 2-4 | Local | Full | N/A | * This game was designed specifically for co-op play. |
| SOCOM U.S. Navy SEALs: Combined Assault | PS2 | Tactical TPS | 2006 | 4 | Online | Full | No(?) | |
| Soccer Brawl | Arcade | Sports | 1992 | 2 | Local | Shared, Full | No | up to 2 players, head to head |
| Soldiers: Heroes of World War II | PC | RTS | 2004 | 4 | LAN, Online | Full | No | |
| Sonic Adventure | DC / GC | Platform | 1998 | 2 | Local | Shared | Yes* | *P2 controls Tails during Sonic's story only. |
| Sonic The Hedgehog 2 | GEN / PS2 / Xbox / GC*/XB360** | Platform | 1992 | 2 | Local | Shared | No | *Part of Sonic Mega Collection. **XBLA |
| Sonic the Hedgehog 3 | GEN PS2 / Xbox / GC* | Platform | 1994 | 2 | Local | Shared | No | *Part of Sonic Mega Collection. |
| Soulcalibur Legends | Wii | Action-Adv. | 2007 | 2 | Local | Split | Yes* | *No Quest Mode (Party Mode only) |
| Söldner-X: Himmelsstürmer | PC / PS3 | Scrolling shooter | 2007 | 2 | Local | Shared | No | |
| Space Invaders Extreme | XB360* | Shoot 'em up | 2009 | 4 | Local, Xbox Live | Shared | No | *XBLA |
| Space Lords | Arcade | Space Sim | 1992 | 2 | Local | Shared | No | |
| Space Siege | PC | Action RPG | 2008 | 4 | LAN, Online | Full | Yes* | *Separate co-op missions |
| Spaceteam | Android/IOS | Real time space ship repair | 2012 | 4(8) | Local | Full | No | *Requires each player to have a phone connected to the same wifi network. |
| Spider-Man: Friend or Foe | PC / PS2 / XB360 / Wii / DS | Beat 'em up | 2007 | 2 | Local | Shared | No | |
| Spider-Man: The Video Game | Arcade | Beat 'em up | 1991 | 4 | Local | Shared | No | |
| Spikeout: Battle Street | Xbox | Beat 'em up | 2005 | 4 | Local, Xbox Live | Shared, Full | No | |
| SpongeBob SquarePants: Plankton's Robotic Revenge | PlayStation 3, Xbox 360, Wii, Wii U, Nintendo DS, Nintendo 3DS | Platform | 2013 | 2-5* | Local | Shared | | *Only the Wii U version includes support for up to five players. The PlayStation 3, Xbox 360, and Wii versions include support for up to four players, while the DS and 3DS versions are single-player only. |
| Spyborgs | Wii | Action-Adv. | 2009 | 2 | Local | ? | ? | |
| Star Trek: Away Team | PC | RTS | 2001 | 2 | LAN, Online | Full | No* | *SP units are shared between players. |
| Star Trek: Elite Force II | PC / MAC | FPS | 2003 | 8 | LAN, Online | Full | No | All Single-Player Missions available up to 4 or 8 players using the "HaZardModding Co-op Mod" found on ModDB.com |
| Star Wars Episode I: Jedi Power Battles | PS1 / DC | Beat 'em up | 2000 | 2 | Local | Shared | Yes* | *Handful of separate co-op missions |
| Star Wars Episode III: Revenge of the Sith | PS2 / XB / GBA / DS / Mobile Phone | Beat 'em up | 2005 | 2 | Local | Shared | Yes* | *4 separate co-op missions |
| Star Wars: Jedi Starfighter | PS2 / Xbox | Space Sim | 2002 | 2 | Local | Split | No* | *Player 2 either controls a ship or a turret depending on the mission. |
| Star Wars Rogue Squadron III: Rebel Strike | GC | Space Sim | 2003 | 2 | Local | Split | Yes* | *Co-op is a 2-player-only version (includes all but 2 missions) of Rogue Squadron II |
| Star Wars: X-Wing vs. TIE Fighter (expansion 1) | PC | Space Sim | 1997 | 4 | LAN | Full | No | |
| StarCraft (incl. expansion Brood War) | PC | RTS | 1998 | | LAN, Online | Full | Yes* | *No SP Campaign; Allied skirmishes vs AI |
| StarCraft II (incl. Wings of Liberty, Heart of the Swarm, Legacy of the Void) | PC | RTS | 2010 | | LAN, Online | Full | | |
| Starlancer | PC | Space Sim | 2000 | 4 | LAN, Online | Full | No | |
| Steel Beasts | PC | Sim | 2000 | | LAN, Online | Full | Yes | |
| Street Fighter Alpha 3 | PS1 / Saturn / DC | Fighter | 1999 | 2 | Local | Full | Yes* | *Beat the game on the maximum difficulty with any character in single player mode to activate Dramatic Mode. |
| Street Fighter IV | PC | Fighter | 2009 | 2 | Local, Online | Full | Yes* | |
| Street Smart | Arcade / GEN | Beat 'em up | 1989 | 2 | Local | Shared | No | |
| Streets of Rage | GEN / GG / Wii | Beat 'em up | 1991 | 2 | Local | Shared | No | |
| Streets of Rage 2 | GEN / GG / Wii | Beat 'em up | 1992 | 2 | Local | Shared | No | |
| Streets of Rage 3 | GEN / Wii | Beat 'em up | 1994 | 2 | Local | Shared | No | |
| Strike Gunner S.T.G | SNES | Shoot 'em up | 1991 | 2 | Local | Shared | No | |
| Stronghold Legends | PC | RTS | 2006 | 4 | LAN, Online | Full | No | |
| Stubbs the Zombie in Rebel Without a Pulse | Xbox | TPS | 2005 | 2 | Local | Split | No | |
| Supreme Commander | PC / XB360 | RTS | 2007 | 8 | LAN, Online | Full | Yes* | * No campaign, skirmish vs. AI only. |
| Supreme Commander 2 | PC / XB360 | RTS | 2010 | 8 | LAN, Online | Full | Yes* | * No campaign, skirmish vs. AI only. |
| Sum of All Fears, The | PC | Tactical FPS | 2002 | 3 | LAN, Online | Full | No(?) | |
| Sunset Riders | Arcade / GEN / SNES | Shoot 'em up | 1991 | 2* | Local | Shared | No | *4 in arcade version |
| Super Contra* | Arcade / C64 / NES / PC / Other / XB360** | Shoot 'em up | 1988 | 2 | Local, Xbox Live*** | Shared | No | *Also known as "Contra C". **XBLA ***XB360 only |
| Super Double Dragon | SNES | Beat 'em up | 1992 | 2 | Local | Shared | No | |
| Super Mario Galaxy | Wii | Platform | 2007 | 2 | Local | Shared | No* | *Limited co-op: P2 assists P1 with a reticle. |
| Super Mario Galaxy 2 | Wii | Platform | 2010 | 2 | Local | Shared | No* | *Limited co-op: P2 assists P1 with a reticle. |
| Super Smash Bros. | N64 | Fighting | 1999 | 4 | Local | Shared | Yes* | *No campaign; co-op only possible with team battles. |
| Super Smash Bros. Brawl | Wii | Fighting | 2008 | 4 | Local, WFC | Shared | No* | *Not available in Training or Classic modes. When playing story mode the game screen follows P1. |
| Super Smash Bros. Melee | GC | Fighting | 2001 | 4 | Local | Shared | Yes* | *No campaign; co-op only possible with team battles. |
| Super Mario Kart | SNES | Racing | 1992 | 2* | Local | split | No | *Players are not considered to be teammates, but rather competitors. |
| Super Stardust HD | PS3* | Action | 2007 | 2 | Local | Shared | No | *PSN |
| Survivor FPS | PC | Survival horrorFPS | 2013 | 64 | LAN, Online | | No | *Multiplayer simulates singleplayer experience |
| SWAT 3: Close Quarters Battle | PC | Tactical FPS | 1999 | | | | | |
| SWAT 4 (expansion 1) | PC | Tactical FPS | 2005 | 5 | LAN, Online | Full | No * | * All campaign missions can (and should) be played cooperatively. |
| Switchball | PC / XB360 | Puzzle | 2007 | 2 | Online | Split, Shared | Yes* | *4 separate co-op levels |
| System Shock 2 | PC | Action-Adv. | 1999 | 4 | LAN | Full | No | Co-op implemented with patch v2.3 |
| Tales of Destiny | PS1 | jRPG | 1997 | 4 | Local | Shared | Yes* | *Restrictive co-op: battles only |
| Tales of Destiny 2 | PS2 | jRPG | 2001 | 4 | Local | Shared | Yes* | *Restrictive co-op: battles only |
| Tales of Eternia | PSP | jRPG | 2005 | | | | Yes* | *Restrictive co-op: battles only |
| Tales of Symphonia | GC | jRPG | 2004 | 4 | Local | Shared | Yes* | *Restrictive co-op: battles only |
| Tales of Symphonia: Dawn of the New World | Wii | jRPG | 2008 | 4 | Local | Shared | Yes* | *Restrictive co-op: battles only |
| Tales of the Abyss | PS2 | jRPG | 2006 | 4 | Local | Shared | Yes* | *Restrictive co-op: battles only |
| Tales of Vesperia | XB360 | jRPG | 2008 | 4 | Local | Shared | Yes* | *Restrictive additional player gameplay: battles only |
| Target: Renegade | NES / ZXS | Beat 'em up | 1988 | 2 | Local | Shared | No | |
| Tasty Planet: Back for Seconds | PC | Puzzle | 2010 | 2 | Local | Shared | No | |
| Teenage Mutant Ninja Turtles | PS2 / Xbox / GC / DS | Beat 'em up | 2003 | 2 | Local | Shared | No | |
| Team Fortress 2 | PC / PS3 / XB360 | FPS | 2007 | 6 | Online | Full | Yes | *Regular Casual and Competitive game modes are not co-op, but the game mode Mann Vs. Machine has a team of 6 players fighting against waves of robots controlled by AI. Players are rewarded with in-game items upon completing missions |
| Teenage Mutant Ninja Turtles* | Arcade / NES / C64 / ZXS / XB360 / Other | Beat 'em up | 1989 | 4 | Local, Xbox Live | Shared | No | *All ports except that of XB360 (XBLA) are titled "Teenage Mutant Ninja Turtles II: The Arcade Game" |
| Teenage Mutant Ninja Turtles 3: Mutant Nightmare | PS2 / Xbox / GC / DS | Beat 'em up | 2005 | 4 | Local* | Shared | No | *DS:local Wi-Fi |
| Teenage Mutant Ninja Turtles III: The Manhattan Project | NES | Beat 'em up | 1991 | 2 | Local | Shared | No | |
| Teenage Mutant Ninja Turtles: Turtles in Time* | Arcade / GEN / SNES | Beat 'em up | 1991 | 2* | Local | Shared | No | *GEN remake is titled Teenage Mutant Ninja Turtles: The Hyperstone Heist **Up to 4 in Arcade version |
| Tenchu Z | XB360 | Action-Adv. | 2007 | 2 | System Link, Xbox Live | Full | No(?) | |
| Tenchu: Wrath of Heaven | PS2 | Action-Adv. | 2003 | 2 | Local | Split | Yes* | *Handful of co-op missions |
| Terraria | PC | Sandbox | 2011 | 2-8/255* | Online, LAN | Full | No | *8 unless running dedicated server software, in which case 255 players can be supported. |
| Terminator Salvation | PC / PS3 / XB360 | TPS | 2009 | 2 | Local | Split | No* | *Requires a 360 controller for PC co-op |
| This is Football 2003* | PS2 | Sports | 2002 | 8 | Local | Shared | No | *Also known as "This Is Soccer 2003" in Australia and "World Tour Soccer 2003" in North America. |
| The Legend of Aylesbury | XB360 | Platform | 2012 | 2 | Local | Shared | No | Available through XBLIG |
| The Legend of Aylesbury | XB360 | Platform | 2012 | 2 | Local | Shared | No | Available through XBLIG |
| The Lord of the Rings: Aragorn's Quest | Wii, PlayStation 3, PlayStation 2, PlayStation Portable, Nintendo DS | Action-adventure | 2010 | 2 | Local | Shared | No | Co-op only available on Wii/PS3, P2 controls Gandalf |
| The Red Solstice | PC | Real-time strategy | 2014 | 8 | Local, Online | Full | | |
| Time Crisis II | Arcade / PS2 | Shooter | 1999 | 2 | Local | Split, Shared* | No* | *Must own a GunCon 2 |
| Time Crisis 3 | PS2 | Shooter | 2003 | 2 | Local | Split | No | |
| Time Crisis 4 | PS3 | Shooter | 2007 | 2 | Local | Split | No | |
| TimeSplitters 2 | PS2 / Xbox / GC | FPS | 2002 | 2 | Local | Split | No | |
| TimeSplitters: Future Perfect | PS2 / Xbox / GC | FPS | 2005 | 2 | Local | Split | | |
| Titan Quest | PC | Action RPG | 2006 | 8 | LAN, Online | Full | No | |
| Titan Quest: Immortal Throne | PC | Action RPG | 2007 | 8 | LAN, Online | Full | No | |
| ToeJam & Earl | GEN | Dungeon crawl / Roguelike | 1992 | 2 | Local | Split, Shared | No | |
| ToeJam & Earl in Panic on Funkotron | GEN | Platform / Rogue-lite | 1993 | 2 | Local | Shared | No | |
| ToeJam & Earl: Back in the Groove | Xbox One, Switch, PS4, PC, Mac, Linux | Dungeon crawl / Roguelike | 2019 | 4 | Local, Online | Split, Shared | No | |
| Tom Clancy's Ghost Recon (expansion 1)(expansion 2) | PC | Tactical FPS | 2001 | 4(?) | LAN, Online | Full | No | |
| Tom Clancy's Ghost Recon (PS2 expansion) | GC / PS2 | Tactical FPS | 2002 | 2 | Local | Split | Yes* | *Levels have to be completed in SP first |
| Tom Clancy's Ghost Recon (expansion 1) | Xbox | Tactical FPS | 2002 | 2* | Local, Link cable, Xbox live | Split, Full | No(?) | *Link cable and online modes: up to 6 players |
| Tom Clancy's Ghost Recon 2 | Xbox | Tactical FPS | 2002 | 4 | Local, System Link, Xbox Live | Split, Full | Yes* | *3 of 15 SP missions are not playable |
| Tom Clancy's Ghost Recon Advanced Warfighter | PC | Tactical FPS | 2006 | 4 | LAN, Online | Full | No | OGR Co-op (up to 24 players) and downloadable maps. SP campaign playable on LAN. |
| Tom Clancy's Ghost Recon Advanced Warfighter | XB360 | Tactical FPS | 2006 | 4* | Local, System Link, Xbox Live | Split, Full | Yes** | *16 through Xbox Live **Handful of co-op maps |
| Tom Clancy's Ghost Recon Advanced Warfighter | Xbox | Tactical FPS | 2006 | 2 | Local, System Link | Split, Full | Yes | |
| Tom Clancy's Ghost Recon Advanced Warfighter 2 | PC | Tactical FPS | 2007 | 4 | LAN, Online | Full | No | OGR Co-op (up to 24 players) and downloadable maps. SP campaign playable on LAN. |
| Tom Clancy's Ghost Recon Advanced Warfighter 2 | PS3 / XB360 | Tactical FPS | 2007 | 4* | Local, Online | Split, Full | Yes** | *Up to 16 players online **Separate 6-mission Co-op Campaign |
| Tom Clancy's Ghost Recon Advanced Warfighter 2 | PSP | TPS | 2007 | 2 | Ad Hoc | Full | No | |
| Tom Clancy's H.A.W.X | PC / PS3 / XB360 | Flight Sim | 2009 | 4 | LAN, Online | Full | No* | *Default difficulty setting only. |
| Tom Clancy's Rainbow Six | PC | Tactical FPS | 1998 | 8(?) | LAN, Online | Full | No | |
| Tom Clancy's Rainbow Six | N64 | Tactical FPS | 1998 | 2 | Local | Split | No(?) | |
| Tom Clancy's Rainbow Six 3: Raven Shield | PC | Tactical FPS | 2003 | 8(?) | LAN, Online | Full | No | |
| Tom Clancy's Rainbow Six 3: Raven Shield | GC / PS2 / Xbox | Tactical FPS | 2003 | 2 | Local | Split | Yes | |
| Tom Clancy's Rainbow Six: Critical Hour | Xbox | Tactical FPS | 2006 | 2 | Local | Split | No(?) | |
| Tom Clancy's Rainbow Six: Lockdown | PC | FPS | 2005 | 4 | LAN, Online | Full | No | Additional co-op Terrorist Hunt mode. |
| Tom Clancy's Rainbow Six: Lockdown | GC / PS2 / Xbox | FPS | 2005 | 2* | Local, Online* | Split, Full* | No | *Xbox only: online co-op, up to 4 players. |
| Tom Clancy's Rainbow Six: Rogue Spear (expansions 1–4) | PC | Tactical FPS | 1999 | 8(?) | LAN, Online | Full | No | |
| Tom Clancy's Rainbow Six: Rogue Spear | PS1 / GBA | Tactical FPS | 2001 | 2 | Local | Full | No | |
| Tom Clancy's Rainbow Six: Vegas | PC | Tactical FPS | 2006 | 2 | LAN, Online | Full | No* | *No SP cutscenes. Additional Co-op Terrorist Hunt mode (up to 4 players). |
| Tom Clancy's Rainbow Six: Vegas | PS3 / XB360 | Tactical FPS | 2006 | 2* | Local, System Link, Xbox Live, PSN | Split, Full | No** | *Via split-screen; up to 4 players online. **No SP cutscenes. |
| Tom Clancy's Rainbow Six: Vegas 2 | PC | Tactical FPS | 2008 | 2 | LAN, Online | Full | No | Additional Co-op Terrorist Hunt mode (up to 4 players) |
| Tom Clancy's Rainbow Six: Vegas 2 | PS3 / XB360 | Tactical FPS | 2008 | 2 | Local, System Link, Xbox Live, PSN | Split, Full | No | Additional Co-op Terrorist Hunt mode (up to 4 players) |
| Tom Clancy's Splinter Cell: Chaos Theory | PC / PS2 / Xbox | Action-Adv. | 2005 | 2 | Lan | Split, Full | Yes* | *7 derivative story-driven missions |
| Tom Clancy's Splinter Cell: Conviction | PC / XB360 | Action-Adv. | 2010 | 2 | Online, Lan | Full | Yes* | *Separate co-op campaign. |
| Tom Clancy's Splinter Cell: Double Agent | PC / PS3 / XB360 | Action-Adv. | 2006 | 3 | Online | Full | Yes* | *No SP campaign or co-op missions. 6-player bot matches only. |
| Tom Clancy's Splinter Cell: Double Agent | PS2 / GC / Xbox / Wii | Action-Adv. | 2006 | 2 | Local, Xbox Live** | Split, Full** | Yes* | *No SP campaign; separate co-op missions **Online play: Xbox version only |
| Too Human | XB360 | Action-Adv. | 2008 | 2 | Xbox Live | Full | No | |
| Tools Up! | PS4 / Xbox One / Nintendo Switch / Windows | Action | 2019 | 2-4 | Local | Full | N/A | * Main campaign was designed specifically for 2-player cooperative play, singleplayer is essentially "co-op campaign for one player". |
| Torchlight II | PC | Action RPG | 2012 | 6 | LAN, Online | Full | | |
| Tornado Outbreak | PS3 / Wii / XB360 | Action-adventure | 2009 | 2 | Local | Shared, Split | No | Unlocks upon the completion of the first two levels Roadside Destruction and Chicken Con Carnage. |
| Trauma Center: New Blood | Wii | Action | 2007 | 2 | Local | Full | No | |
| Trauma Team | Wii | Action | 2009 | 2 | Local | Full | *Some modes are pass-and-play only | |
| Trine | PC / PS3 | Platform / Puzzle | 2009 | 3 | Local | Full | No | |
| Tunnels of Doom | TI-99/4A | Early RPG | 1982 | 4 | ? | Shared | No | |
| Turok | PC / PS3 / XB360 | FPS | 2008 | 4 | LAN, Online | Full | Yes* | *3 separate co-op levels; SP campaign not available. |
| TwinBee (series)* | Arcade / DS / GBA / NES / GEN / PS1 / Saturn / SNES* | Scrolling shooter | 1985+ | 2 | Local | Shared | No* | *Numerous titles, see the main page |
| Twisted Metal 2: World Tour | PS1 | Car Combat | 1996 | 2 | Local | Split | No | |
| Twisted Metal 3 | PS1 | Car Combat | 1998 | 2 | Local(?) | Split | No | |
| Twisted Metal 4 | PS1 | Car Combat | 1999 | 2 | Local(?) | Split | No | |
| Twisted Metal: Small Brawl | PS1 | Car Combat | 2001 | 2 | Local | Split | No | |
| Twisted Metal: Black | PS2 | Car Combat | 2001 | 2 | Local | Split | No | |
| Twisted Metal: Black Online | PS2 | Car Combat | 2003 | 2 | Online | Shared | No | |
| Twisted Metal: Head-On | PS2 / PSP | Car Combat | 2005 | 2 | Local | Split | No | |
| Twisted Metal (2012 video game) | PS3 | Car Combat | 2012 | 2 | Online | Shared | No | |
| Two Crude Dudes | GEN | Beat 'em up | 1992 | 2 | Local | Shared | No | |
| U.N. Squadron | Arcade | Scrolling shooter | 1991 | 2 | Local | Shared | No | |
| UFO: Alien Invasion | PC | TBS | 2008 | 8 | LAN, Online | Full | Yes* | Only battle mode, no geoscape mode |
| The Uncanny X-Men | NES | Action-Adv. | 1989 | 2 | Local | Shared | No | |
| Uncharted 2: Among Thieves | PS3 | Action-Adv. | 2009* | 3 | Online | Full | Yes | No SP campaign available. A 3-person online mode with certain missions using altered SP campaign maps. |
| Unreal | PC | FPS | 1998 | ? | LAN, Online | Full | No*(?) | *Requires patch 224v or later |
| Untold Legends: Brotherhood of the Blade | PSP | Beat 'em up | 2005 | 4 | Local | Full | No | |
| Untold Legends: Dark Kingdom | PS3 | Action RPG | 2006 | 2* | Local, Online | Shared(?) | No | *up to 4 online |
| Untold Legends: The Warrior's Code | PSP | Beat 'em up | 2006 | 4 | Local | Full | No | |
| Up | PC / PS2 / PS3 / XB360 / Wii / PSP / DS | Action-Adv. | 2009 | 2 | Local | Shared | No | (Handheld)Platform differences may apply. |
| Urban Reign | PS2 | Beat 'em up | 2005 | 2 | Local | Shared | Yes | *Only available on missions w/ partner after entering the co-op cheat. |
| Vampire Night | Arcade / PS2 | Shooter | 2000 | 2 | Local | Shared | No | |
| Vendetta | Arcade | Beat 'em up | 1991 | 2* | Local | Shared | No | *Up to 4, depending on version |
| Vietcong | PC | FPS | 2003 | 32* | LAN, Online | Full | Yes* | *No SP Campaign; bot matches only. Player made maps and custom campaigns. |
| Vietcong: Fist Alpha | PC | FPS | 2004 | 32* | LAN, Online | Full | Yes* | *No SP Campaign; bot matches only. Player made maps and custom campaigns. |
| Violent Storm | Arcade | Beat 'em up | 1993 | 3 | Local | Shared | No | |
| Virtua Cop | Arcade / PC / Saturn | Shooter | 1994 | 2 | Local | Shared | No | |
| Virtua Cop 2 | Arcade / PC / DC / Saturn | Shooter | 1995 | 2 | Local | Shared | No | |
| Virtua Cop 3 | Arcade | Shooter | 2003 | 2 | Local | Shared | No | |
| Virtua Cop: Elite Edition* | PS2 | Shooter | 1994 | 2 | Local | Shared | No | *aka Virtua Cop: Rebirth. Compilation of VC1 and VC2 |
| Viva Piñata: Trouble in Paradise | XB360 | Sim | 2008 | 2* | Local, Online | Shared, Full | Yes** | *Up to 4 online **Certain P2 limitations |
| Wakeboarding Unleashed | PC / PS2 / Xbox | Sports | 2003 | 2 | Local(?) | Shared | No(?) | P1 drives the boat, P2 controls the wakeboarder |
| Warcraft: Orcs & Humans | PC | RTS | 1994 | | LAN, Online(?) | Full | Yes* | |
| Warcraft II: Beyond the Dark Portal | PC | RTS | 1996 | | LAN, Online(?) | Full | Yes* | |
| Warcraft II: Tides of Darkness | PC | RTS | 1995 | 4(?) | LAN, Online(?) | Full | Yes* | *SP Campaign is not available; AI skirmishes only |
| Warcraft III: Reign of Chaos | PC | RTS | 2002 | | LAN, Online(?) | Full | Yes* | Campaign Coop (2-3 players) available through community forum downloads, Google "warcraft 3 campaign coop" for more details. |
| Warcraft III: The Frozen Throne | PC | RTS | 2003 | | LAN, Online(?) | Full | Yes* | Campaign Coop (2-3 players) available through community forum downloads, Google "warcraft 3 campaign coop" for more details. |
| Warhammer 40,000: Dawn of War II | PC | RTS | 2009 | 2 | Online | Full | No* | * Full campaign, though only the hosting player gets to keep achievements and progress. Also has a skirmish mode. |
| Warriors of Fate | Arcade / PS1 / Saturn | Beat 'em up | 1994 | 2* | Local | Shared | No | *3 in Arcade version |
| Warriors Orochi | PC / PS2 / XB360 / PSP | Beat 'em up | 2007 | 2 | Local* | Split | No | *PSP: Ad hoc |
| Warriors Orochi 2 | PS2 / XB360 | Beat 'em up | 2008 | 2 | Local | Split | No | |
| Warriors, The | PS2 / Xbox / PSP | Beat 'em up | 2005 | 2 | Local | Split | No | |
| Watchmen: The End Is Nigh | PC / PS3 / XB360 | Beat 'em up | 2009 | 2 | Local | Split | No | |
| We Love Katamari | PS2 | Puzzle | 2005 | 2 | Local | Shared | No(?) | |
| White Knight Chronicles | PS3 | jRPG | 2010 | 4 | PSN | Full | Yes* | *No SP campaign: separate co-op content. |
| Will Rock | PC | FPS | 2003 | 4 | LAN, Online | Full | No | |
| Wizard of Wor | Arcade / Atari 8-bit / Atari 2600 / Atari 5200 / Commodore 64 / Bally Astrocade | Action-adventure | 1981 | 2 | Local | Full | | |
| Wolf of the Battlefield: Commando 3 | PS3 / XB360* | Shoot 'em up | 2008 | 3 | Local, Online | Shared | No | *PSN / XBLA |
| Wolfenstein: Youngblood | PS4 / Xbox One / Nintendo Switch / Windows | First-person shooter / Action-adventure | 2019 | 2 | Local, Online | Shared | No | *Steam / PlayStation Network / Xbox Live |
| Wonder Boy III: Monster Lair | Gen | Platform | 1988 | 2 | Local | Shared | No | |
| Woody Woodpecker Racing | GBC / PSX / PC | Racing | 2000 | 2 | Local | Splitscreen | No | versus mode only |
| World Combat | Arcade | Shooter | 2003 | 2* | Local | ? | No | *2–4, depending on version |
| World in Conflict | PC | RTS | 2007 | 16(?) | LAN, Online | Full | Yes* | *SP Campaign is not available; AI skirmishes only |
| World in Conflict | XB360 | RTS | 2008 | ? | Xbox Live | Full | Yes(?)* | *SP Campaign is not available; AI skirmishes only(?) |
| World of Goo | Wii / Linux | Puzzle | 2008 | 1-4 | Local | Shared | No | *Linux need modify config to use more mouse |
| World of Illusion Starring Mickey Mouse and Donald Duck | GEN | Platform | 1992 | 2 | Local | Shared | No | |
| WorldShift | PC | RTS | 2008 | 2 | LAN, Online | Full | Yes* | *Separate co-op content needs to be unlocked through SP. |
| WWE SmackDown! Here Comes the Pain | PS2 | Wrestling | 2003 | 6 | Local | | | |
| WWE SmackDown! vs. Raw | PS2 | Wrestling | 2004 | 6* | Local, Online | | | *Only 2 players online |
| WWE SmackDown vs. Raw 2006 | PS2, PSP | Wrestling | 2005 | 6* | Local, Ad-hoc, Online | | | *Up to 4 players online |
| WWE SmackDown vs. Raw 2007 | PS2, PSP, XB360 | Wrestling | 2006 | 6* | Local, Ad-hoc, Online | | | *Up to 4 players online and 360 local |
| X-Men | Arcade | Action | 1992 | 2* | | | | *Up to 6, depending on a version |
| X-Men 2: Clone Wars | GEN | Action | 1995 | 2 | Local | Shared(?) | No | |
| X-Men Legends | PS2 / Xbox / GC / PSP | Action RPG | 2004 | 4 | Local, Online* | Shared* | No | *Platform differences apply |
| X-Men Legends II: Rise of Apocalypse | PC / PS2 / Xbox / GC / PSP | Action RPG | 2005 | 4 | Local, Online* | Shared* | No | *Platform differences apply |
| X-Men: Reign of Apocalypse | GBA | Beat 'em up | 2001 | 2 | Link Cable | Full | No(?) | - |
| Xenophobe | Arcade / NES / Other | Platform | 1987 | 2* | Local | Shared | No | *3 in Arcade version |
| ZeroRanger | PC | Scrolling shooter | 2018 | 2 | Local | Shared | No | |
| Zombie Wranglers | XB360* | Shoot 'em up | 2009 | 4 | Local, Xbox Live | Shared | No | *XBLA |
| Zombie Apocalypse | PS3 / XB360 | Shoot 'em up | 2009 | 4 | Local | Shared | Yes | |
| Zombieland: Double Tap – Road Trip | Windows, Nintendo Switch, PlayStation 4, Xbox One | Shoot 'em up | 2019 | 2-4 | Local | Shared | Yes* | *In the Switch version, players use the directional buttons to aim when using side-ways Joy-Cons. |
| Zombies Ate My Neighbors | GEN / SNES | Shoot 'em up | 1993 | 2 | Local | Shared | No | |
| Guacamelee! | PC / PS3 / PS4 / PS Vita / Wii U / XB360 / Xbox One / Nintendo Switch | Beat 'em up | 2013 | 1-4 | Local | Shared | Yes* | *The prologue is only playable in single player. |
| Icarus | Windows | Survival | 2021 | 1-8 | Online | Full | No | |
| It Takes Two | Windows, PS4, PS5 | Action-adventure, platform | 2021 | 2 | Local, Online | Full, Shared | | |
| Split Fiction | Windows, PS5, Xbox Series X/S | Action-adventure, platform | 2025 | 2 | Local, Online | Full, Shared | | |

== See also ==
- List of cooperative Xbox 360 games
