= Project Eden =

Project Eden or The Eden Project may refer to:

- Project Eden (video game), a 2001 action-adventure video game
- Dirty Pair: Project Eden, a 1986 anime film
- Eden Project, a visitor attraction in Cornwall, England
- Eden (Irish musician), formerly known as The Eden Project
