= Cooperative video game =

Type of video game

A cooperative video game, often abbreviated as co-op video game, is a video game that allows players to work together as teammates, usually against one or more non-player character opponents (PvE). Co-op games can be played locally using one or multiple input controllers or over a network via local area networks, wide area networks, or the Internet.

Co-op gameplay has gained popularity as controller and networking technology has developed. On PCs, consoles and mobile devices, cooperative games have become increasingly common, and many genres of games—including shooter games, sports games, real-time strategy games, and massively multiplayer online games—include co-op modes.

In 2025, cooperative games (specifically non-MMO games such as Lethal Company, R.E.P.O. and PEAK) gained the derogatory slang term Friendslop, coined alongside the complementary term "Friendfarming".

== History ==
=== Arcade co-op gaming ===
The first video game to feature co-op play dates back to 1973, with Atari's arcade video game Pong Doubles, which was a tennis doubles version of their hit arcade game Pong (1972). Co-op play was later featured in another Atari coin-op, Fire Truck (1978).

Several early 1980s arcade coin-op games allowed for co-op play. Wizard of Wor offered solo, competitive two-player, or co-op two-player gaming while Williams Electronics' Joust encouraged players to alternatively compete and cooperate by awarding bonus points for co-op play in some rounds and awarding bonuses for attacking the other player in others. Two-player games of Nintendo's Mario Bros. could be played competitively or cooperatively.

Co-op games became particularly popular among operators of coin-op video games as they had the potential to net double the revenue per game. Drop-in/drop-out co-op was pioneered by Gauntlet (1985) which came in models of two and four players for different locations. This trend was followed by the likes of Quartet (1986), Ikari Warriors (1986), and Rampage (1986) which became high-earners for American operators.

Beat 'em up games, exemplified by Double Dragon (1987), were among the most successful games of the late 1980s. Their co-op nature often included mechanics such as friendly fire, providing more opportunities for dynamic play. The feature became expected in the beat 'em up genre and was present in megahits such as Final Fight (1989), Teenage Mutant Ninja Turtles (1989), and The Simpsons (1991). Ports of these games to home consoles were often criticized for their lack of co-op functionality.

In 1998, Time Crisis II launched as the first in the series as a two-player arcade rail shooter where two players could provide cover for each other. In 2009 Konami and Activision released Guitar Hero Arcade, a co-op rhythm game which allowed players to work together to complete a song of their choosing or the two players could fight each other in the battle mode with each guitarist striving for a higher score.

=== Console co-op gaming ===
Early-generation home consoles typically did not offer co-op options, due to technical limitations which hindered the increased graphics required for simultaneous co-op play. Though consoles from the second generation of video games onward typically had controller ports for two-player games, most systems did not have the computing or graphical power for simultaneous play, leading most games that billed "2-player gameplay" as a feature to merely include the single player game mode with alternating players.

During this early era, many video games which featured co-op play (including beat 'em ups such as Double Dragon) were ported to less advanced home systems. Alternating play replaced the arcade's co-op play in the NES version (although Double Dragon II and III, for the same system, did retain their co-op gameplay). Most other titles featuring two-player were head-to-head sports titles. Though most of the console beat 'em ups were arcade ports, original franchises such as Streets of Rage and River City Ransom also became popular.

In the run-and-gun shooter genre, Contra was more successful in its NES incarnation than it was in the arcades in the North American market. Gunstar Heroes for the Sega Genesis and the Metal Slug series for the Neo Geo were also well-received titles.

Electronic Arts has produced key co-op sports games, including the original NHL Hockey (1991) and Madden NFL (1990) installments on the Sega Genesis. These games allowed two players or more to play against the CPU.

Due to the lack of online multiplayer, co-op games in the RPG genre have generally been less common on console systems than on PCs. Nevertheless, some of the earliest co-op action RPGs were console titles, including the TurboGrafx-16 game Dungeon Explorer (1989) by Atlus which allowed up to five players to play simultaneously, and Square's Secret of Mana (1993) for the Super NES which offered two- and three-player action once the main character had acquired his party members. Secret of Mana's co-op gameplay was considered innovative in its time, as it allowed the second or third players to drop in and out of the game at any time. This function influenced future titles, such as Dungeon Siege III. Final Fantasy VI (1994) offered a form of alternating co-op play for its battles, with the second player taking control of half of the characters in the party. Namco's Tales series allowed multiple players to take control of individual members in its real-time battles in some of the titles, such as Tales of Symphonia, while the Baldur's Gate: Dark Alliance games replicated the Diablo formula for consoles, offering two-player simultaneous play through the game's campaign.

With the release of the Nintendo 64 (1996, 1997), having four controller ports started to become a standard feature in consoles, as the Dreamcast, GameCube and Xbox all later featured them. As larger multiplayer games became feasible, co-op gameplay also became more available. The 7th and current generations of video game consoles all feature wireless controllers, removing port-based local player limits.

=== PC co-op gaming ===
==== First-person shooters ====
The release of Doom in 1993 was a breakthrough in network gaming. Up to four players could travel through the entire game together, playing on separate computers over a LAN. The game's campaign mode was designed primarily for single player, but the difficulty was tweaked to compensate for extra human players. The following three games produced by id Software (Doom II, Quake and Quake II) all featured co-op modes.

Starting from the early 2000s, however, some FPS developers didn't develop co-op campaign play, opting to focus more purely on either a more detailed and in-depth single player experience or a purely multiplayer game. Epic's Unreal Tournament series had shifted almost entirely towards deathmatch modes, and significant FPS releases such as Doom 3, Quake 4, and both Half-Life titles shipped without co-op gameplay modes. However, Killing Floor, originally a total conversion mod for the game Unreal Tournament 2004, first released in 2005, introduced the co-op wave-based survival game mode. After the Gears of War franchise introduced the term, Horde mode, which is a four-player co-op wave-based survival game mode, the co-op game mode has undergone a resurgence, starting a trend which included Halo 3: ODST's "Firefight" mode and Call of Duty: World at War's "Nazi Zombies" mode. More games in the genre from the 2010s include the Payday, Overwatch, and Destiny series.

==== Role-playing games ====
Most early role-playing video games were inspired by multiplayer tabletop game Dungeons & Dragons, but were restricted to single player due to the technology of the era. The earliest RPGs featuring something resembling co-op play were MUDs, which would later evolve into the MMOG genre.

In 1989, Image Works released Bloodwych for MS-DOS and various other platforms which featured a two-player co-op mode via split screen where 2 players needed to cooperate in order to solve puzzles and eliminate enemies.

Later PC RPGs allowed players to collaborate in games over the Internet. Blizzard Entertainment's Diablo (1996), which incorporated Blizzard's online matchmaking service, battle.net, allowing the game's players to play through the entire single player campaign together. The D&D-sanctioned Baldur's Gate and Icewind Dale games, released in 1998 and 2000, respectively, allowed up to six players to play through the campaign mode over a network. Atari's Neverwinter Nights (2002) was an official and comprehensive D&D simulator, featuring tools for players to create their own game content, and developed an online community. It allowed one player to serve as a Dungeon Master, shaping and altering the game world against a party of human-controlled players, playing co-op. (An earlier game, Vampire: The Masquerade – Redemption (2000) was the earliest CRPG to feature this sort of "storyteller" mode.)

Contemporary MMORPGs such as Blizzard Entertainment's World of Warcraft feature a mixture of single-player goals ("quests") and larger end-game challenges that can only be completed via intensive co-op play, of up to twenty-five (formerly forty) players in end-game raids, and up to forty versus forty in battlegrounds.

== Gameplay characteristics ==
=== Couch co-op and online co-op modes ===
Co-op games can be played locally using one or multiple input controllers or over a network via local area networks, wide area networks, or the Internet. Co-op games designed to be played by multiple players on the same display screen have come to be known as "couch co-op", "local co-op" or "split screen multiplayer" games. Co-op games in which players each use their own display system are known as "online co-op", "network co-op" or "multiplayer co-op" games due to the majority of such systems utilizing telecommunications networks to synchronize game state among the players. Games have also been brought to market in which both modes can be combined—accommodating more than one display with each display accommodating one or more players.

While there are no practical technical limits to how many players can be involved in a co-op game, the industry has settled on games that support up to four players as an informal standard. This comes from a combination of factors. Historically, co-op arcade video games maxed out at four players. Similarly, consoles which supported local co-op play on the same screen also maxed out at four players. There is also a human factor according to various developers. While having more than four players involved could make a game more interesting to play, this starts to exceed a comfortable number related to social interactions between players and may cause segmenting of the larger group into smaller ones, while up to four players encourages cooperation and coordination within that group.

=== Display features ===
Many video games support split screen displays in order to show two or more players in different regions of the game. Split screen displays would usually split the main screen into either two or four sub-regions so that 2–4 players can roam freely within the game world. Many first-person and third-person shooter games use this technique when played in multiplayer co-op mode, such as the console versions of games in the Rainbow Six series, the Halo series or the fifth installment of the Call of Duty series, Call of Duty: World at War.

Split screen modes have also been combined with 3D Television technology by hobbyists, using alternate-frame sequencing for the purpose of presenting each of two couch co-op players with their own 2D full-screen image on the same display, rather than for stereoscopy. Due to the complexity involved in correcting the resulting aspect ratios, and that in obtaining 3D glasses which allowed both lenses to synchronize to the same eye-frame, this remained the purview of enthusiasts until 2011, when Sony Computer Entertainment America began to market a 3D display product for their consoles. This display system supported this practice under the trademark SimulView. While the SimulView feature set was designed to work only with the Sony 3D monitor, the move renewed interest in this technology, and it was not long before the gaming community circumvented this vendor lock-in gambit, allowing SimulView-supporting games to utilize the feature on third-party 3DTV equipment.

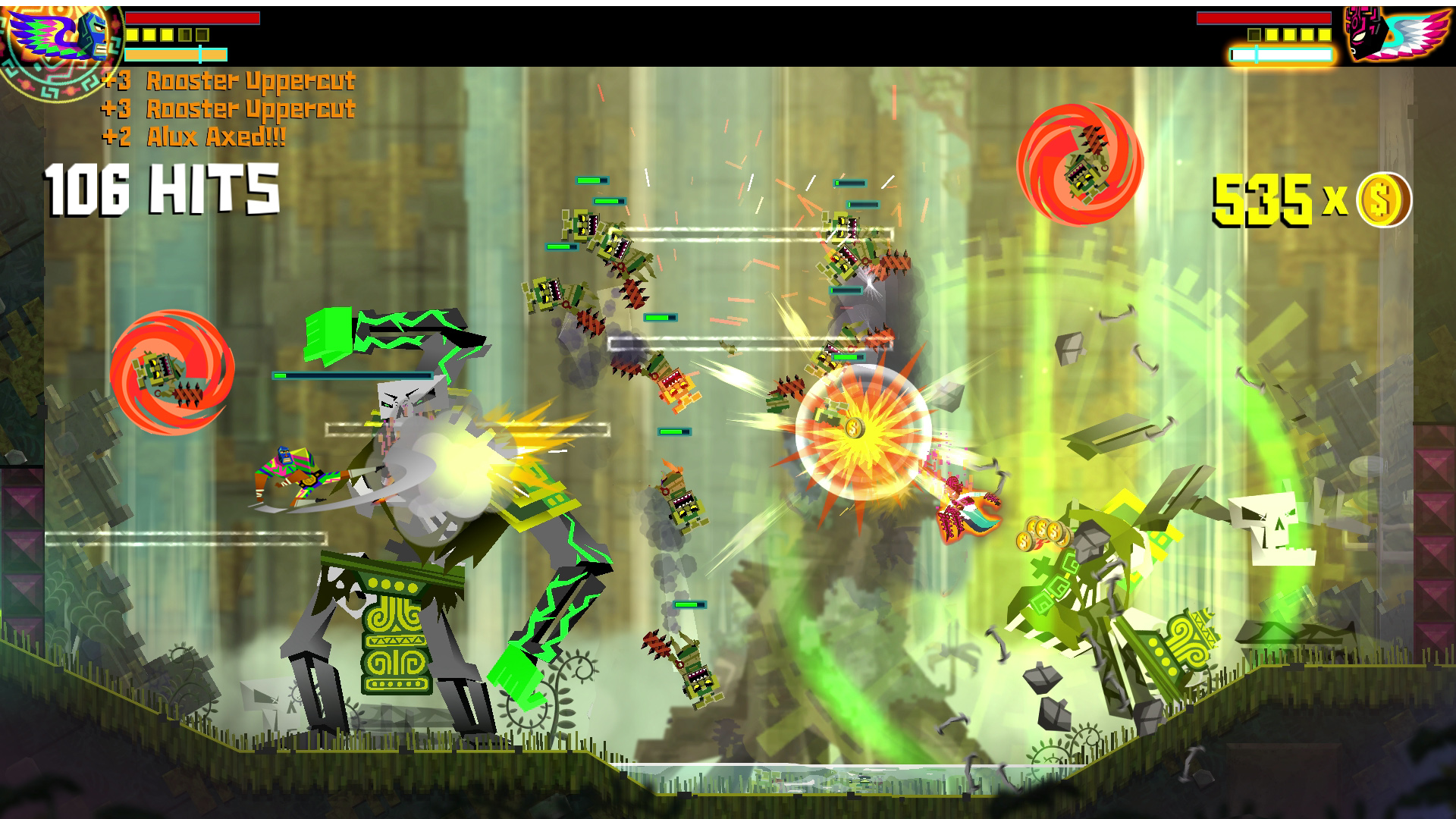
Guacamelee is a brawler-based platform game that features co-op play, allowing the two luchador characters to coordinate their actions for more effective combat.

By contrast, in co-op platform games, both players typically occupy the same screen and must coordinate their actions, particularly with regard to the scrolling. If the scrolling is limited to a forward direction only, players can potentially kill each other. For example, one player lagging behind could cause problems for his partner, as the screen will not scroll onward. If a player was attempting to complete a jump over a chasm, the "safe" surface on the far side of the chasm could be prevented from scrolling into view by a slow player.

Developers have attempted to counter these frustrations by using a camera that can zoom in and out over an entire level as needed, keeping both players within the scope of the camera. This type of camera was used to enable the display of four player co-op gameplay in New Super Mario Bros. Wii. Another strategy allows player screens to be split when the player characters are far apart, but combine into one full-screen image when player characters are close enough together. The 2005 video game The Warriors is considered notable for attempting this in a 3D third-person perspective format.

=== Resource management ===
A common concept in co-op games is the sharing of resources between players. For example, two players managing one team in a real-time strategy game, such as StarCraft, will often have to draw off the same pool of resources to build and upgrade their units and buildings. The sharing of resources, however, can be as simple as the system used in the Contra games (and other shoot-'em-up/beat-'em-up games) where a player who is out of spare lives could "steal" a life from the other player so both players could continue to play at the same time.

=== Role of the second player ===
The second player's role is pivotal in co-op video games, fundamentally altering the gaming experience by introducing a dynamic element of cooperation. Co-op games typically adapt their single-player counterparts, enabling additional players to assume control of distinct characters within the game's universe. These characters, while visually and physically separate from the first player's avatar, must adhere to the same fundamental game rules, including managing their individual health bars and resources. This co-op dynamic injects depth and collaboration into the gaming experience, fostering a sense of teamwork as players strategize and coordinate their actions to overcome challenges and achieve objectives throughout levels.

In some instances, co-op games transcend mere adaptation, offering a unique and immersive co-op system. These games may introduce entirely new co-op maps, characters, and mechanics specifically tailored to multiplayer gameplay. This approach enriches the overall gaming experience, catering to players who seek a more robust and engaging co-op adventure.

Furthermore, co-op games provide a range of options for players to engage with one another. Split-screen modes are a common feature, allowing players to share a single screen while independently controlling their characters. This setup enhances the social aspect of co-op gaming, enabling more effective communication and strategic coordination. Additionally, players can choose from various display options to match their preferences, whether it's playing on a single screen, utilizing multiple monitors, or participating in online multiplayer.

Some games, like Super Mario Galaxy, the Wii version of Prince of Persia: The Forgotten Sands, Super Mario Odyssey and some versions of Transformers: Revenge of the Fallen, however, limit the second player to an omniscient, invulnerable helper role, where they can assist the first player. This may include the ability to attack enemies within the first player's view, typically via a targeting reticle. Other co-op games such as It Takes Two and Evolve give the other player special roles, tasks or abilities.

In essence, the second player's role in co-op video games is far from a duplicate of the first player. It introduces a unique perspective, fostering a culture of teamwork and mutual support. Often, these games also incorporate additional features to enhance the co-op gaming experience, creating a space where players can come together, strategize, and share the joys of gaming in an interactive and immersive way.

== See also ==
- List of cooperative video games
- Player versus environment
- Player versus player

== Bibliography ==
- Smith, Jonas Heide (2007). "Tragedies of the ludic commons - understanding cooperation in multiplayer games". Game Studies. 7 (1). ISSN 1604-7982. Archived from the original on 2023-05-17.
- Williams, Dmitri (2005). A Brief Social History of Game Play. Digital Games Research Conference 2005. Vancouver.
