= Jackal (video game) =

1986 video game

- Flyer from the Konami Software Club
- Developer: Konami
- Publisher: Konami
- Platforms: Arcade, NES, Famicom Disk System, ZX Spectrum, Commodore 64, IBM PC, Mobile phone
- Release: Arcade: JP: October 15, 1986; NA: October 1986; Famicom Disk System: JP: May 2, 1988; NES: NA: October 1988
- Genre: Run and gun
- Modes: Single-player, multiplayer

Jackal (Note: Japanese: 特殊部隊ジャッカル, Hepburn: Tokushu Butai Jakkaru; lit. Special Forces Jackal), released in North America as Top Gunner, is a run and gun video game developed and published by Konami for arcades. It was released in October 1986 and ported to the Nintendo Entertainment System, Famicom Disk System, ZX Spectrum, Commodore 64, and IBM PC compatibles.

== Plot ==
The Jackal unit is an elite group of four soldiers that have undergone a harsh training regimen to survive in any environment. The team is composed of Colonel Decker, Lieutenant Bob, Sergeant Quint and Corporal Grey. They have been given a mission to drive two armed jeeps into hostile territory in order to rescue and extract POWs.

== Gameplay ==
Jackal can be played by up to two players simultaneously. A second player can join in during play any time and the two jeeps are numbered on their hoods to indicate which player is in control. The player must maneuver an armed jeep in order to rescue prisoners of war (POWs) trapped in enemy territory. The controls consist of an eight-way joystick and two attack buttons - one to fire the jeep's machine gun turret (which always shoots upwards) and another to launch grenades in the direction the jeep is facing. The grenade launcher can be upgraded into a missile launcher which can be further upgraded up to three times, giving it a longer reach and then allowing it to fire shrapnel rounds that spread in to two or four directions. The machine gun has weaker firepower but a faster firing rate, while the grenade/missile launcher can destroy most enemy vehicles and artillery in one shot, and can also destroy gates and buildings.

The game starts with a pair of transport helicopters dropping the player's jeep into the coast of the enemy territory, followed by a plane which drops the jeep's driver and gunner. The main objective is to penetrate the enemy's main headquarters and destroy their ultimate weapon. Along the way, the player will proceed through numerous internment camps where the POWs are held. Prisoners held in solitary camps will upgrade the jeep's grenade/missile launcher by one level. The player's jeep can only carry up to eight prisoners and once it is filled, the player must drive to the nearest heliport where an extraction chopper awaits to retrieve them. Players receive more points for extracting prisoners in succession. If a player successfully extracts eight prisoners in a row into the chopper, the jeep's missile launcher will be upgraded to the next level. Jackal does not have a traditional stage structure; instead, the entire game takes place in one long continuous level. The player will go through a variety of different areas throughout the course of the mission such as an ancient ruins, a lake, a hill and a mountain before reaching the enemy headquarters. The background music changes the further the players go into the game.

The player's jeep can run over foot soldiers, but will be destroyed if it gets shot by a projectile or collides with an enemy vehicle. When a player's jeep is destroyed, a replacement jeep will appear and the missile launcher will be downgraded by one level. If the previous jeep was carrying POWs, the survivors will spread themselves out from the wreckage, waiting to be picked up again. An extra jeep can be obtained by obtaining a certain number of points. The game ends when the player accomplishes the mission or runs out of replacement jeeps. A map is shown at the game over screen showing how far the player has progressed. While Jackal does feature a continue feature, the player can "cheat" the game by using the join-in feature and switching to the other control panel before being taken to the game over screen.

== Version differences ==
Jackal was originally designed to be played with rotary joysticks similar to the ones used by SNK in some of their games at the time such as TNK III and Ikari Warriors. The rotary joystick allowed the player to not only maneuver the jeep, but also control the direction of where the machine gun turret is aimed, allowing the player to shoot in any of eight directions. A version of Jackal with this control scheme was market tested, but didn't receive wide distribution. The wide releases of the game use a standard eight way joystick instead.

The game was distributed as Tokushu Butai Jackkaru (特殊部隊ジャッカル, literally, "Special Forces Jackal") in Japan, Top Gunner in North America and simply as Jackal in Europe, Oceania and Asia. The Japanese version of the game differs from the other releases in that the player's jeep shoots in the direction it faces instead of always shooting upwards, affecting the kind of tactics that the player must employ in order to proceed through the mission. Aside from the title, the Top Gunner variant of the game is almost identical to the international version of Jackal, but has a slight cosmetic difference: the yellow and blue flags that adorned the player jeeps in Jackal have each been replaced by the U.S. flag, while many of the enemy camps and vehicles are adorned with the Vietnamese flag.

== Ports ==
=== NES ===
Jackal was released for the Nintendo Entertainment System (NES) in October 1988 in North America. This version has the following differences from the arcade original:

- The two player jeeps are now colored differently. Player 1's jeep retains the standard green coloring, while Player 2 controls a brown jeep.
- The player has much more space to maneuver due to the change from a vertical orientation to a horizontal one.
- Instead of taking place in one long level, the game is now divided into six checkpoints named, in order of appearance, Alpha, Baker, Charlie, Delta, Tango, and Zulu. Each checkpoint features a different boss awaiting at the end, which include enemies not seen in the arcade version such as missile-spitting statues, a battleship and a new final boss (a giant tank equipped with a flamethrower, which can be destroyed effectively with the machine gun).
- The grenade/missile launcher only needs to be upgraded three times to reach its maximum power rather than four. However, if a player loses a jeep, the weapon will revert to the initial grenade launcher instead of being downgraded to its previous level.
- The player's jeep can carry as many POWs as there are in each stage rather than being limited to just eight. While there are no point bonuses for delivering POWs in succession, the player's grenade/missile launcher will be upgraded by one level when a certain number of prisoners are taken to the chopper.
- Three hidden power-up icons have been added: a green star that adds an extra jeep to the player's stock, a red star that kills all on-screen enemies and a flashing star that upgrades the missile launcher to the highest level. These can only be found by launching grenades or missiles in certain hiding spots.

A Japanese version was released for the Family Computer Disk System (FDS) a few months prior on May 2, 1988 under the title ファイナルコマンド 赤(あか) い 要(よう)塞(さい) (Fainaru Komando: Akai Yōsai, "Final Command: Red Fortress"). This earlier version lacks some of the content that was later added to its NES counterpart due to it being released in disk card format rather than on a ROM cartridge. Namely, the stages in the FDS version only scroll vertically, have different layouts and are much shorter as a result. Checkpoint Alpha is not featured in this version and thus, Checkpoint Baker serves as the introductory stage instead, and Checkpoint Zulu has no prisoners to rescue.

=== Other platforms ===
In Europe, Konami released ports of Jackal for the ZX Spectrum, Amstrad CPC and Commodore 64 in 1988. An MS-DOS version was released in North America in 1989 alongside a different Commodore 64 port. These versions were roughly based on the arcade game. A ROM image of the NES Jackal is included in the Windows PC compilation Konami Collector's Series: Castlevania & Contra released in 2002 in North America, but the game is inaccessible by legitimate means and can only be found by extracting it from the executable. The game is virtually identical to the original NES release, aside from the updated copyrights date.

In July 2009, Konami released a mobile version of Akai Yōsai for feature phones through their Konami Net DX service. This version features the added content from the NES version of Jackal, as well as improved graphics much closer in quality to the arcade version. An unrelated mobile version of Jackal (also based on the NES game) was released by Konami for the Chinese market on August 5, 2010.

The arcade version of Jackal was released for the Game Room service on October 27, 2010.

== Reception ==
In Japan, Game Machine listed Jackal on their November 15, 1986 issue as being the third most-successful table arcade unit of the month.

Jackal is ranked number 37 on IGN's top 100 NES games list.
