= Project Eden (video game) =

2001 video game

- NTSC cover art
- Developer: Core Design
- Publisher: Eidos Interactive
- Producer: Andy Watt
- Designers: Heather Gibson; Neal Boyd
- Programmers: Gavin Rummery; Phil Callaghan; Ray Tran
- Artists: Stuart Atkinson; Joss Charmet
- Writer: Gavin Rummery
- Composer: Martin Iveson
- Platforms: Windows; PlayStation 2
- Release: Windows: NA: 12 October 2001; EU: 26 October 2001; PlayStation 2: NA: 22 October 2001; EU: 2 November 2001
- Genre: Action-adventure
- Modes: Single-player, multiplayer

Project Eden is a 2001 action-adventure video game developed by Core Design and published by Eidos Interactive. It was released for Windows and the PlayStation 2. The planned Dreamcast version was cancelled. The development took approximately four years, the team having previously worked on Tomb Raider II (1997). The plot involves a squad of four law enforcement agents investigating the disappearances of people by working their way downwards through layers of a towering megacity. Project Eden's gameplay emphasises puzzle-solving, requiring the player or players to control each of the four characters and use their individual abilities to make progress. A single player can control any one of the characters, and jump between them at will or up to four players can play simultaneously as different members of the team.

== Plot ==
The game starts with Urban Protection Agency (UPA) agents Carter Dorlan, Andre Herderman, Minoko Molensky, and Amber Torrelson heading below city limits to find two technicians missing from the Real Meat Company (a corporation that ironically produces synthetic meat). The suspicions of the team revolve around a local and dangerous gang named the Death Heads. The UPA team tracks the gang down to their base in St. Lucia's Church; but on their way, the gang members and many animals also start mutating into strange creatures. Clearing their way through the Church, battling the mutants, the UPA Team finally get close to the technicians, only to see them being taken far below city limits, possibly to Ground Zero (the term used for the ground level of the earth itself). The UPA Control instructs the UPA Team to recover a creature, a live one, for analysis; which shows that it has been a regular dog which had been tampered with using an old gene splicer (this hints at the fact that genetic engineering has advanced greatly). The analysis also reveals that the creatures they have been attacked by are being controlled by a signal; which is their next job, to both find and if possible, recover the technicians, and locate the source of the signal.

On their way the UPA Team encounter little girls who are blonde, wear a red dress and call themselves Lucy. After some talk they mutate into dangerous beasts. Minoko, while going to another sector of the city by a high-speed railcar, mentions that she once had a sister named Lucy, but that Lucy had died due to a genetic disorder that she and their mother suffered from. As they continue, the team starts to question if Minoko's family was involved in their situation. The train crashes before reaching its destination, and leaves Minoko trapped in by a group of cannibals. Upon their arrival, Carter asks Control to check out Minoko's father, Dr. Joseph Molenski, who was once a skilled technician and a biological engineer, and who was dismissed from Real Meat for stealing machinery for his own research. As a fugitive, Molenski was never apprehended by the UPA, nor was Lucy. Minoko was taken to the UPA Recreation Program, and thus became a UPA Agent.

After traversing a former zoo that is now inhabited by cannibals and mutants, the team arrive at Ground Zero, the nominal ground level of the city. The team continues to levels below sea level. During their investigation, they stumble upon a video recording of Dr. Molenski, saying that he has found a nuclear bunker underneath, and has also rigged up a basic gene splicer. He also mentions that using it, he hopes to cure Lucy.

The UPA Team enter the Eden Bunker, and upon their entrance, they discover that Dr. Molenski was trapped in a time dilation field, a field that which stops time around a given area, or slows it down immensely; similar to the effect of the team's Timeshock weapon. Molenski appears to be reaching out towards a computer. After deactivating the time dilation field, Minoko is kidnapped. Lucy tells Minoko that she has been creating the creatures, and the girls that mutated (in attempt to find a new body for herself) were her failures due to the different DNA of those girl victims that were too much to deal with. Since Minoko is her biological sister, Lucy wishes to take her body.

Meanwhile, Molenski is told that fifteen years have passed, and asked what has happened. The answer is simple; in order to keep Lucy alive, Molenski had linked her mind to the computers, running half of her brain with them, while keeping her body in a time dilation field. However, since the computers were networked, Lucy took them over and tried to solve things her own way. The other three UPA Team members rescue Minoko, and they deactivate Lucy's time dilation field causing her death. Molenski removes the computer connected to Lucy's head and inserts it into a robot body he has built for her to try to keep her brain alive. Mission accomplished, the UPA Team returns to the surface.

== Critical reception ==
Reception

Aggregate score
| Aggregator | Score | |
| Aggregator | PC | PS2 |
|---|---|---|
| Metacritic | 72/100 | 71/100 |

Review scores
| Publication | Score | |
| Publication | PC | PS2 |
|---|---|---|
| Computer Games Magazine | 3.5/5 | N/A |
| Computer Gaming World | 1.5/5 | N/A |
| Edge | 7/10 | 7/10 |
| Eurogamer | N/A | 7/10 |
| Game Informer | N/A | 5.5/10 |
| GamePro | N/A | 4/5 |
| GameRevolution | B− | N/A |
| GameSpot | 7.8/10 | 7.6/10 |
| GameSpy | 81% | 70% |
| GameZone | 7.8/10 | 7/10 |
| IGN | 9/10 | 7.8/10 |
| Next Generation | 3/5 | N/A |
| Official U.S. PlayStation Magazine | N/A | 3.5/5 |
| PC Gamer (US) | 59% | N/A |

Project Eden received "average" reviews on both platforms according to the review aggregation website Metacritic. The Electric Playground gave the PC version a favorable review and said, "A few minor annoyances like poor enemy AI and some puzzles that seem almost too difficult keep it from a higher score, but if you're looking for a game you can invest some time in and not feel like you came away with nothing, welcome to Eden." AllGame gave both console versions three stars out of five each, saying of the PC version, "Playing Project Eden at least once is worthwhile, but the linear puzzles, bad combat engine, and a multiplayer component that utilizes it limit hard-drive life considerably. Once finished, it's doubtful any gamer will return to the city depths"; and of the PlayStation 2 version, "It is designed specifically for those who enjoy using their minds, and it will occasionally even frustrate the best of those players."

Kevin Rice reviewed the PC version of the game for Next Generation, rating it three stars out of five, and stated that "This game needs a coat of wax and a buffing, but the creativity in its design and execution warrant playing through."

IGN ranked it as the 87th best PlayStation 2 game. Project Eden was a nominee for GameSpot's 2001 "Best Adventure Game" award, which ultimately went to Myst III: Exile.
