= David Banner (game designer) =

Welsh game designer

Dr David Banner MBE
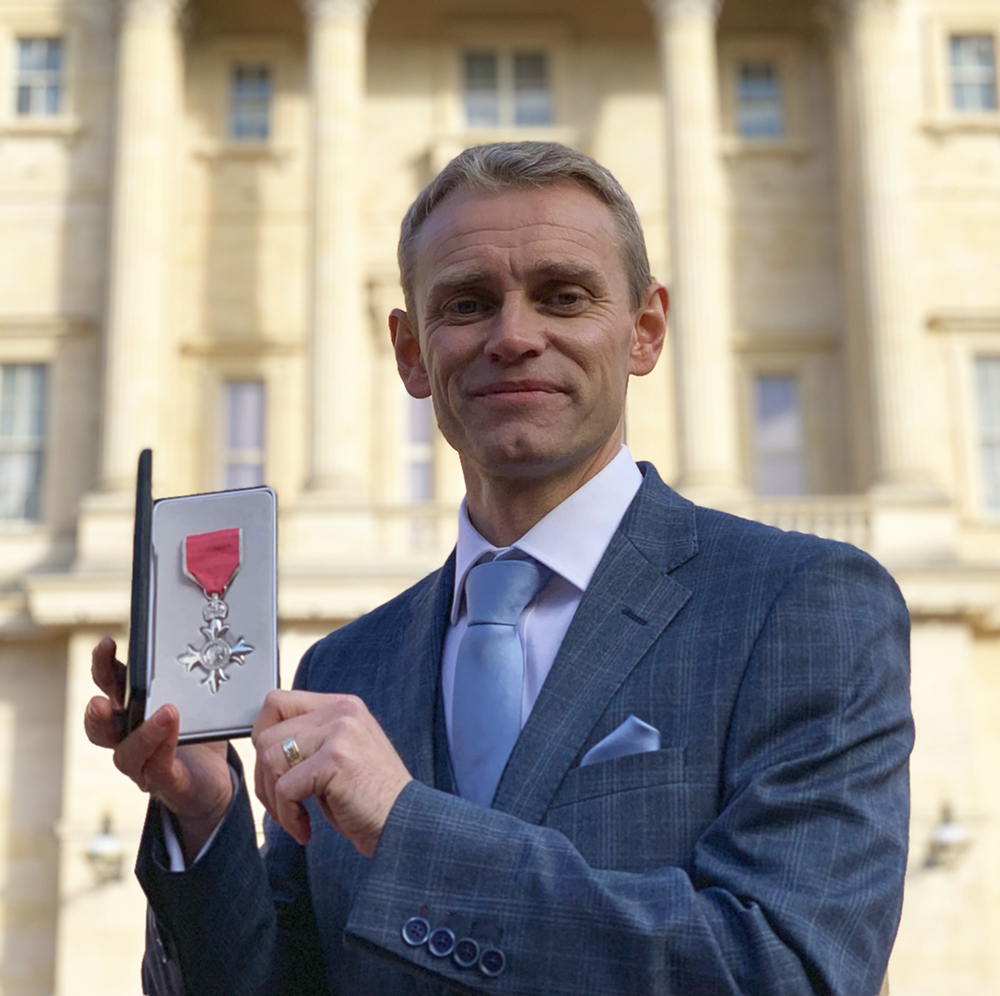
- David Banner at Buckingham Palace 2018
- Born: 1 November 1972 (age 53); Rhondda, Wales
- Occupations: Video games and interactive film artist, designer, producer, director and entrepreneur
- Known for: Co-founder of Wales Interactive, Co-creator for Maid of Sker, Sker Ritual and Soul Axiom. Executive Producer for Late Shift, The Complex, Five Dates, Ten Dates and Dead Reset.

David Banner MBE (born November 1972) is a Welsh video games and interactive film designer. He is also known in the video games and interactive film industries as “Dai”.

He is the co-founder and CEO of video game and interactive film developer and publisher Wales Interactive.

== Biography ==
Banner was born on 1 November 1972 in Rhondda, Wales. He attended Treorchy Comprehensive School and Tonypandy Comprehensive School, then Mid Glamorgan Centre for Art, Design and Technology. He then received a Graphic Design degree at De Montfort University, Leicester, where he graduated in 1995 with a first-class honour. After graduating, Banner started his professional video game career in London as an artist and designer for video game developer and publisher Domark, which later became Eidos Interactive.

Banner first professional game as an artist and game designer was Crimewave released on Sega Saturn in 1996. Banner also worked as a game artist on both All Star Soccer which launched in 1997 and Viva Football which launched 1998.

In 1998 Banner co-founded Genuine Games and held the roles of Managing Director and Art Director.

In 1999 Banner worked for Broadsword Interactive as lead artist on Spirit of Speed 1937 and Paris Dakar Rally.

In 2002 Banner worked for Pivotal Games as lead artist and designer on Conflict: Desert Storm II, The Great Escape, Conflict: Vietnam and Conflict: Denied Ops.

Banner created Flibbidy Jibs: Stop the Machine!!! developed by Genuine Games and published by Singularity Software in 2004.

In 2007 Banner became a visiting lecturer at University of Glamorgan (now University of South Wales). With his participation at the University of South Wales, a separate course for a degree in game art was created.

In November 2008 Banner undertook a Sahara Trek to raise money for The Marie Curie Hospice in Penarth. In May 2009 Banner did the National 3 Peaks Challenge to again raise money for The Marie Curie Hospice in Penarth.

In 2010 Banner was Project Manager for DigiLab, later renamed Gameslab, a collaborative project between University of Glamorgan (now part of University of South Wales) and Swansea Metropolitan University (now part of University Wales Trinity St David) designed to support and develop the computer games sector in Wales.

Banner co-founded the multi-award winning video games and interactive film company Wales Interactive in 2012. The company Develops and Publishes titles across PC, PlayStation, Xbox, Nintendo, iOS and Android platforms worldwide.

In 2017, he won the St David Awards for Enterprise. In 2018, he was made a Member of the Order of the British Empire (MBE) for service to the video game industry.

In 2018, Banner won Digital Ambassador of the Year at the Wales Online Awards and the Pride of De Montfort University Alumni Award.

In 2020 Banner was awarded the title of Honorary Doctor of Technology from De Montfort University. Banner was appointed by Welsh Government as Creative Wales Non-Executive Board Member in 2020.

In 2025 Banner won IOD Wales Director of the Year for Innovation

He is co-creator and co-director of Sker Ritual and Maid of Sker games, both global hits based on Welsh folklore.

Banner has contributed to the re-invention of the interactive film genre with titles such as Late Shift, which won the BAFTA Cymru game award in 2018 and, The Complex, which received 7 nominations in the British Film Festival Awards, going on to win in two categories. In 2023 Five Dates was nominated for the BAFTA Cymru Feature/Television Film Award. In 2026 Dead Reset won the Gameplay Innovation of the Year Award at MCV/Develop Awards

His combined portfolio of games has achieved in excess of 21 million downloads worldwide.

== Games ==
- Crimewave (1996)
- All Star Soccer (1997)
- Viva Football (1998)
- Spirit of Speed 1937 (1999)
- Paris Dakar Rally (2001)
- The Great Escape (2003)
- Conflict: Desert Storm II (2003)
- Conflict: Vietnam (2004)
- Flibbidy Jibs: Stop the Machine!!! (2004)
- Paradise (2006)
- Conflict: Denied Ops (2008)
- Attack Kumquat (2010)
- Gravity Badgers (2013)
- Master Reboot (2013)
- Infinity Runner (2014)
- Soul Axiom (2015)
- Don’t Knock Twice (2017)
- Time Carnage VR (2018)
- Maid of Sker (2020)
- Sker Ritual (2024)
- Hazard Levels (2026)

== Interactive films ==
- The Bunker (2016)
- Late Shift (2017)
- The Shapeshifting Detective (2018)
- The Complex (2020)
- Five Dates (2020)
- Night Book (2021)
- I Saw Black Clouds (2021)
- Bloodshore (2021)
- Who Pressed Mute on Uncle Marcus? (2022)
- Ten Dates (2023)
- Mia and the Dragon Princess (2023)
- The Isle Tide Hotel (2023)
- Dead Reset (2025)
- The Heart of the Forest (2026)
