= The Complex =

The Complex may refer to:

- The Complex (album), by Blue Man Group
- The Complex (film), 2013 film directed by Hideo Nakata
- The Complex (Los Angeles, California), a historic mixed-use building that formerly housed a theater of the same name
- The Complex (Valdosta, Georgia), a multi-purpose arena
- The Complex (video game), a 2020s video game released by Wales Interactive
- The Complex: An Insider Exposes the Covert World of the Church of Scientology, 2008 book by John Duignan
- The Complex: How the Military Invades Our Everyday Lives, 2008 book by Nick Turse
- The Complex, the name used to refer to the Backrooms in Backrooms (web series)

== See also ==
- Complex (disambiguation)
