= Don't Knock Twice =

Don't Knock Twice may refer to:

- Don't Knock Twice (film), a supernatural horror film directed by Caradog W. James
- Don't Knock Twice (video game), a horror video game developed by Wales Interactive
