= Knee Deep (disambiguation) =

"Knee Deep" is a song recorded by the Zac Brown Band with Jimmy Buffett.

Knee Deep may also refer to:

- Knee Deep (video game)
- "Knee Deep" (Home Improvement)
- "Knee Deep" (Roseanne)
- "Knee Deep" (Lydia song)
- "(Not Just) Knee Deep", a song by Funkadelic
