= Turn of the Screw (disambiguation) =

The Turn of the Screw is a novella by Henry James.

(The) Turn of the Screw(s) may also refer to:

== Film ==
- The Turn of the Screw (1974 film), a film by Dan Curtis
- The Turn of the Screw (1999 film), a film by Ben Bolt
- The Turn of the Screw (2009 film), a film by Tim Fywell
- The Turn of the Screw (1982 film), a film by Petr Weigl, starring Magdaléna Vášáryová
- The Turn of the Screw (1990 film), a film by Graeme Clifford
- The Turn of the Screw (1992 film), a film by Rusty Lemorande
- The Turn of the Screw (2020 film), a film by Alex Galvin

== Music ==
- The Turn of the Screw (opera), a 1954 opera by Benjamin Britten
- The Turn of the Screw, a 1980 ballet score by Luigi Zaninelli
- Turn of the Screw, a 1989 album by Dirty Looks
- Turn of the Screw (album), a 2004 album by 1208
- The Turn of the Screw, a 2009 song by Heaven and Hell from The Devil You Know

== Stage ==
- The Turn of the Screw (play), a 1996 stage play adaptation by Jeffrey Hatcher
- The Turn of the Screw, a 2013 stage play adaptation by Rebecca Lenkiewicz

== Television ==
- The Turn of the Screw (Ford Startime), a 1959 adaptation for Ford Startime, directed by John Frankenheimer.
- The Turn of the Screw (1999 film), a British television film adaptation starring Jodhi May
- "Turn of the Screws", an episode of CSI: Crime Scene Investigation
- "Turn of the Screw", an episode of Blade: The Series
- The Haunting of Bly Manor (2020 limited television series)

== See also ==
- The Innocents (play), a 1950 play by William Archibald based on the James novella
- The Innocents (1961 film), a film by Jack Clayton based on the Archibald play and the James novella
