= Simulacra (video game) =

2017 detective-horror video game

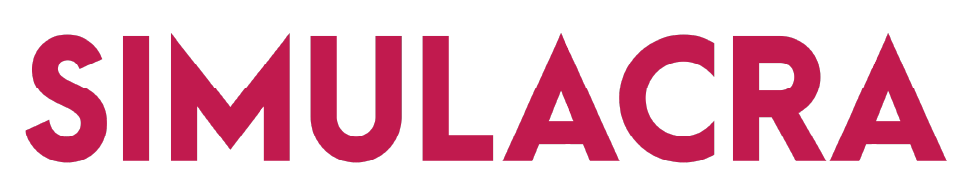
- Game logo
- Developer: Kaigan Games
- Publisher: Kaigan Games (Note: Console versions published by Wales Interactive.) (Note: PC version published by Neon Doctrine and Kaigan Games.)
- Writers: Shern Chong, Jeremy Ooi, David Teigen
- Series: Simulacra
- Engine: libGDX
- Platforms: Android; iOS; Windows; macOS; Nintendo Switch; PlayStation 4; Xbox One
- Release: Android, iOS, Windows; October 26, 2017 macOS; June 2, 2018; Switch, PS4, Xbox One; December 3, 2019
- Genre: Horror
- Mode: Single-player

Simulacra (stylized in all caps) is a 2017 detective-horror game developed and published by Malaysian video game developer Kaigan Games. It was released for the Windows, iOS, Android, macOS, PlayStation 4, Xbox One and Nintendo Switch.

== Plot ==
The player finds a lost mobile phone that belonged to a person named Anna. Attempting to access the phone through the lock screen causes the phone to suddenly crackle, with the distorted screen showing "Help me". The phone continues to do things on its own, leading to a certain video. It's showing a scared Anna begging whoever is watching not to come after her. In order to find out what happened to Anna, the goal for the player is to collect all the information possible and try to find the AI Simulacrum, the one behind Anna's disappearance.

== Gameplay ==
As a spiritual successor to the game Sara is Missing, Simulacra revolves around exploring the missing person's phone. There are various contacts that can be interacted with, such as her friends or boyfriend. The players can also fix glitched messages and images or check the installed apps like Spark, Jabbr and Surfer. However, during these said ventures, the player may experience some glitches and jumpscares on the phone and an individual called "Aulner" trying to message the player in odd capitalization, asking the player to find him and by doing so the player will supposedly find Anna.

The game has 4 endings unlocked by following a specific narrative branch.

== Reception ==
Simulacra Reception

Aggregate score
Aggregator	Score
Metacritic	72/100 (Xbox One & PS4) 64/100 (Nintendo Switch) 82/100 (iOS)

Review scores
Publication	Score
Adventure Gamers	3/5 stars
IGN	8.4/10

Simulacra received "mixed or average" reviews from critics for the Xbox One, PlayStation 4 and Nintendo Switch versions of the game, while the iOS version received "generally favorable" reviews, according to review aggregator Metacritic. Simulacra has garnered an 8.4/10 on IGN, with them saying "Overall, the game offers a compelling yet uncomfortable journey, a must try for horror fans!".

== Sequels ==
Release timeline
2015	Sara is Missing
2016
2017	Simulacra
2018	Simulacra: Pipe Dreams
2019
2020	Simulacra 2
2021
2022	Simulacra 3

Kaigan Games have also released several follow-up games: a spin-off; Simulacra: Pipe Dreams on October 26, 2018, and two sequels Simulacra 2 and Simulacra 3 on January 30, 2020, and October 25, 2022, respectively.
