= White Noise: The Light =

- UK theatrical release poster
- Directed by: Patrick Lussier
- Written by: Matt Venne
- Produced by: Shawn Williamson
- Starring: Nathan Fillion; Katee Sackhoff; Craig Fairbrass; Tegan Moss
- Cinematography: Brian Pearson
- Edited by: Tom Elkins; Patrick Lussier
- Music by: Normand Corbeil
- Distributed by: TVA Films (Canada); Rogue Pictures (United States)
- Release date: January 5, 2007 (UK)
- Running time: 99 minutes
- Countries: Canada; United States
- Language: English
- Budget: $10 million
- Box office: $8.5 million

White Noise: The Light, also marketed as White Noise 2, is a 2007 supernatural horror thriller film directed by Patrick Lussier and starring Nathan Fillion and Katee Sackhoff. Written by Matt Venne, it is a stand-alone sequel to the 2005 film White Noise, directed by Geoffrey Sax.

The film received a theatrical release internationally on January 5, 2007, but was released direct-to-video in the United States on January 8, 2008. The film received generally positive reviews, but was not commercially successful, and failed to recoup its $10 million budget.

== Plot ==
After witnessing the murder of his wife and young son at the hands of Henry Caine (Craig Fairbrass), who then turned the gun on himself, Abe Dale (Nathan Fillion) is so distressed that he attempts to take his own life. A near-death experience follows that leaves Abe with the ability to identify those who are about to die. He acts on these premonitions to save three people from death, among them a nurse met during his recovery, Sherry Clarke (Katee Sackhoff).

Abe soon learns that Henry, before murdering Abe's wife and son, actually saved their lives. Abe concludes that Henry also had the ability to see death. Wanting to learn more about Henry, Abe visits his house only to learn that Henry survived his suicide. Investigating further, Abe discovers the phenomenon of "Tria Mera", The Third Day, when Christ was resurrected. Also on the third day the devil takes possession of the mortals who cheated death. Abe concludes that three days after he saved their lives, those he saved will be possessed and compelled to take the lives of others. Accepting this responsibility, Abe comes to terms with the horrible fact that he must consider killing those he had saved to prevent further tragedy.

Abe is unsuccessful in preventing the second man he saved from killing others, arriving seconds too late. However, Abe is able to take the gun from the man before he kills himself. Abe tries to explain the situation to Sherry but she is at first non-receptive and he must follow her to the cafe where his wife and son were murdered. While driving he sees his own aura in the rear view mirror, predicting his own death. This time, Sherry listens but, just as Abe brings up the gun, police who are already in the cafe shoot him dead. Abe spends his last minutes trying to convince Sherry she must kill herself before her own possession is complete. However, as she reaches for the gun the police pick it up and she becomes hysterical, and is put into an ambulance.

As the ambulance leaves, Sherry struggles against the demons inside her. Back at the cafe, Abe's life force leaves his body as a lightning streak in pursuit of Sherry's ambulance vaulting from one utility post to the next. He reaches the ambulance and appears to Sherry as a spectre of himself. He is able to comfort her before the demons possess her. She acknowledges him and expires peacefully after he places his hand over her heart. Up ahead, the speeding ambulance is unaware of an accident blocking its path. An 18-wheel fuel tanker is disabled and a commuter bus is stopped. Abe, still manifested as a ghostly spirit, appears on the street directly in front of the ambulance, causing the driver to swerve, avoid a near miss collision with the tanker, thus saving all the people at the scene, including the EMTs. Abe's mission completed, he finally sees a bright white light in front of him with his family waiting in the distance and is able to move on. Back at Blackmount County Asylum, Henry is tormented and driven further insane by the restless spirits of all the victims who died at the hands of people he saved.

== Cast ==
- Nathan Fillion as Abe Dale
- Katee Sackhoff as Sherry Clarke
- Craig Fairbrass as Henry Caine
- Adrian Holmes as Marty Bloom
- Kendall Cross as Rebecca Dale
- Teryl Rothery as Julia Caine
- William MacDonald as Dr. Karras
- David Milchard as Kurt Green
- Tegan Moss as Liz
- Chris Shields as Father Nathan
- David Orth as Dr. Serling

== Production ==
Budgeted at approximately $10 million, the film is rated PG-13 for intense sequences of violence and terror, some disturbing images, thematic material and some language.

== Release ==
The film was released to 915 movie theaters internationally and was released direct-to-video in the United States on January 8, 2008.

=== Home media ===
The film's first Blu-ray release occurred in Canada on November 18, 2008, in a double feature with the first film. It has since gone out of print. The film debuted on Blu-ray for the first time in the United States on February 11, 2020, in a double feature release with Rosewood Lane (2011). The disc was released by Mill Creek Entertainment.

== Soundtrack ==
In the film, Abe witnesses a children's prayer concert that includes "The Spirit of Radio" by Rush, as arranged by Terry Frewer, a Vancouver-based composer, and performed by the Vancouver Bach Children's Chorus. Soloists for this performance include Madeline Busby and Olivia Curth.

== Box office ==
White Noise: The Light grossed US$8.52 million internationally as of January 27, 2008.

== Reception ==
The film received better reviews than its predecessor. As of June 2020, the review aggregate website Rotten Tomatoes reported a 75% approval rating with an average rating of 5.14 out of 10, based on eight reviews.
