= Dead Reset =

2025 video game

- Developers: Dark Rift Horror; Wales Interactive
- Publisher: Wales Interactive
- Platforms: Android; iOS; macOS; Nintendo Switch; PlayStation 4; PlayStation 5; Windows; Xbox One; Xbox Series X/S
- Release: WW: September 11, 2025
- Genre: Adventure game
- Mode: Single-player

Dead Reset is a 2025 adventure game using full motion video developed by Dark Rift Horror and Wales Interactive. Wales Interactive published it in September 2025 for multiple platforms.

== Gameplay ==
Players control Cole Mason, an amnesiac surgeon trapped in a time loop. As Mason comes to in a research lab, he is required to operate on a patient who has a monstrous parasite growing in her. At various points in the story, which is presented via full motion video, players must choose between two options. Some choices reset the time loop with Mason's death. Others reveal information about what is going on or advance the plot down different paths. Cinematic sequences are skipped over if players have seen them before. There are multiple endings. It includes a "streamer mode", which allows people watching a livestream to influence outcomes.

== Plot ==
Cole Mason suddenly awakens inside a facility with no memory of how he got there. He is met by Magson, the facility director; Slade, the chief of security; Fearne, the head researcher; Weir, the psychologist; and Cooper, the engineer. As the facility surgeon, Cole is ordered to perform an operation on a patient named Amanda in order to remove a foreign growth in her body. However, upon beginning his operation, Cole finds the growth is some kind of alien creature, which bursts out of Amanda's body and proceeds to kill everybody in the room. When Cole dies, he finds himself looped back to the moment he wakes up. After several loops, he finally convinces the other staff to believe he is trapped in a time loop, and they sedate the creature and successfully remove it, but Cole is unable to save Amanda.

With the creature in containment, Cole learns that the facility is meant to study a special time displacement machine that Magson had invented. For some reason, he feels compelled to touch the machine, which triggers him to see visions of possible events which he uses to save Cooper from being electrocuted from a power surge. However, the creature manages to escape containment and kills Cooper before escaping into the vents. The creature also inadvertently damages some power conduits, initiating a lockdown and trapping everybody inside the control room. Magson forces Cole to enter the vents to repair the damage and override the lockdown. Fearne helps him escape the vents and reveals Magson has been using convicted criminals as test subjects for her time displacement machine, which has killed almost everybody who has used it. She also admits Amanda was her sister. Slade then arrives to confront them, until they realize the creature has absorbed the biomass of the deceased test subjects in the morgue and has grown exponentially in size. Cole tries to fight the creature, but realizes to his horror that it can predict all his moves. Weir opens the elevator to help them escape, but he is killed by the creature.

Cole, Slade, and Fearne confront Magson. She theorizes that Cole is undergoing time loops due to his contact with the time displacement machine and the creature also apparently retains memories from previous loops. She also admits that a side effect of the time displacement machine is that it alters the DNA of anybody that uses it, which is what results in a high fatality rate but also what caused the mutation in Amanda's body that created the creature. When the trio demands that they leave the facility, Magson reveals they are currently located 10,000 meters beneath the ocean, and the only way to leave is via an escape pod that will take two hours to arrive from the surface. She then tells the trio that the time displacement machine is malfunctioning and drawing too much power from the reactor, which will cause a cascade failure that will destroy the facility in one hour.

Cole is forced to head down to the lab level to reactivate the life support system so Magson can access the time displacement machine's override. After restoring oxygen and evading the creature again, Cole finds a prototype time displacement gun as well as videos showing he is actually one of the test subjects who managed to survive. He angrily confronts Slade and Fearne, who admit he arrived in the facility six months ago as a test subject, and one of the side effects of the time displacement machine is memory loss. Magson then stabs Fearne and locks them in the lab, intending to escape by herself. Slade uses the prototype gun to breach the lab while Cole attempts to save Fearne's life, with him succeeding or failing depending on his relationship with her. The survivors then make their way to the escape pod, where they find Magson slain by the creature. At this point, the endings diverge based on whether Fearne is alive or not.

If Fearne is dead, Cole and Slade attempt to fight the creature, with Slade being mortally wounded. Cole can then either destroy the time displacement machine or reset it in hopes of looping back to the point where he was first put into the time displacement machine.

- If Cole decides to reset the machine, Slade takes the opportunity to leave in the escape pod. Unfortunately, the reset point causes Cole to enter a shorter time loop where he's endlessly killed by the creature.
- If Cole decides to destroy the machine, he attempts to leave in the escape pod, only for Slade to attack and stab him to death. The escape pod suffers damage and explosively decompresses, killing Slade.

If Fearne survives, Slade is killed fighting the creature, leaving Cole with the choice to either try to kill the creature, or escape with Fearne.

- If Cole chooses to fight, he manages to apparently kill the creature, but the escape pod automatically detaches with Fearne inside, leaving him stranded. Some time later, it's revealed the creature has assimilated Cole into its body.
- If Cole chooses to escape, both he and Fearne manage to leave in the escape pod safely. However, the creature impersonates Slade's voice to call a rescue team.

== Development ==
Developer Dark Rift Horror was founded in York, England in 2015. Wales Interactive released Dead Reset for Windows, macOS, PlayStation 4 and 5, Xbox One and Series X/S, Android, iOS, and Nintendo Switch on September 11, 2025.

== Reception ==
Dead Reset received mixed reviews on Metacritic. Despite their initial feeling that Dead Reset felt like an Alien clone, Bloody Disgusting enjoyed the story and found the various narrative paths to all be interesting. They praised the visuals, practical special effects, and acting, though they said the limited gameplay will probably appeal more to horror film fans than hardcore gamers. Nintendo Life found the gory death scenes amusing. Although they praised the story and production design, they were less impressed by the acting and found the low budget distracting. They also experienced bugs on the Switch. Reviewing a preview, Nintendo World Report said they "broadly enjoyed" the early part of the story that they got to experience, and they praised the acting. PC Gamer, after playing a demo, called it "an utter riot" that was part Alien, The Evil Dead, and Stargate SG-1.
