= Don't Knock Twice (film) =

- Official release poster
- Directed by: Caradog W. James
- Written by: Mark Huckerby; Nick Ostler
- Starring: Katee Sackhoff; Lucy Boynton; Javier Botet; Nick Moran; Richard Mylan
- Cinematography: Adam Frisch
- Edited by: Matt Platts-Mills
- Music by: James Edward Barker; Steve Moore
- Production companies: Seymour Films; Red & Black Films
- Release dates: 22 September 2016 (Raindance Film Festival); 3 February 2017 (United States)
- Running time: 93 minutes
- Country: United Kingdom
- Language: English

Don't Knock Twice is a 2016 British supernatural horror film directed by Caradog W. James.

== Plot ==
In Wales, Jessica "Jess" Webb-Thomas, an American sculptor and former drug addict, meets with her estranged daughter Chloe (from Jess's prior marriage and sent to foster care due to the former's drug addiction) and invites her to come live with her and her second husband, Ben Thomas. Chloe declines. That night, Chloe goes out with her friend Danny to a house where legend says a witch lived. The two knock twice on the door and leave. Danny starts experiencing paranormal occurrences and is later dragged away by an unseen force. When the demonic spirit frightens Chloe, she accepts Jess' offer and moves in with her.

Chloe is initially hostile to her family. Strange events unfold, beginning when Chloe finds a human molar in her carrot and coriander soup. Jess suffers from a nightmare about an old woman crying in her house. In her nightmare, the woman looks at Jess and says "Przepraszam" ("I'm sorry" in Polish), before slitting her own throat. Jess tells Chloe about her dream and, finding this description familiar, Chloe tells her about Mary Aminov, a supposed witch that used to live next door. After her death by suicide, an urban legend started that she would come and get you if you knocked twice on her door. While sculpting, Jess's model Tira is disturbed by Chloe's presence and leaves. Chloe believes to be haunted by Baba Yaga, a demonic witch from Slavic folklore.

Chloe slowly warms up to her mother. One day, Jess discovers her workshop in shambles with "She's mine" scrawled on the floor. That night, the two are terrorized by the witch. The next day, a portal opens and Chloe is almost dragged inside but is saved by Jess. They meet with Tira, who says that Mary was never a witch. Because Chloe helped spread the false rumor of witchcraft, Mary's spirit wants revenge. Chloe flees in panic, convinced that the disappearances were her fault. She is found and returned to the foster home. Jess goes to retrieve her and has an epiphany that the true culprit of the disappearances was not Mary but Detective Boardman. Chloe is taken by the witch.

Jess breaks into Mary's abandoned house, injuring her foot on an old nail. She is caught and sent to the police station, but not before knocking twice at the door. When she is alone in her prison cell, she is taken through the same portal. She wanders into a cave where she finds a cage with Chloe in it. Jess gets her out and Baba Yaga pursues them; meanwhile, Boardman arrives at the witch's home. The pair are able to escape through the front door, but Boardman is dragged inside by the witch.

Ben returns home and is confronted by a mysterious figure in their bedroom. Jess and Chloe arrive home but find Ben missing. Tira is shown leaving the property covered in blood with Ben's dead body in the trunk of her car. The "Slave of Baba Yaga" symbol is shown on her chest. Jess informs Chloe that Boardman was the culprit, but Chloe reveals that while in the other world she saw Michael, and that he was indeed taken by Mary and fed to Baba Yaga and that Boardman was innocent. It's then that Jess realizes that Tira lied and tricked her into offering Boardman's life to Baba Yaga in order to transfer the demon to Jess.

Jess is surprised by a sudden burning sensation from her necklace and realizes that she now has the mark of Baba Yaga. The room goes dark and there are two knocks at the door. As it opens, the figure of Baba Yaga reaching toward them is the last thing seen before the film ends.

== Cast ==
- Katee Sackhoff as Jessica "Jess" Webb-Thomas*
- Lucy Boynton as Chloe Webb*
- Javier Botet as Ginger Special
- Nick Moran as Detective Boardman
- Jordan Bolger as Danny
- Pooneh Hajimohammadi as Tira
- Richard Mylan as Ben Thomas*
- Ania Marson as Mary Aminov
- Callum Griffiths as Michael Flowers

Note: Their surnames are revealed in the video game adaptation.

== Reception ==
Don't Knock Twice received mixed to negative reviews. The review aggregator Rotten Tomatoes gave a 28% approval rating with a weighted average of 5.2/10. Noel Murray of the LA Times called the film " a warmed-over hash of Candyman, Oculus, Insidious and a half-dozen other spook-shows." Simon Abrams of rogerebert.com noted how "the makers of Don't Knock Twice never successfully flesh out their characters as people, leaving viewers to roll their eyes whenever characters open the wrong door."

== Video game ==
A first-person survival horror video game developed and published by Wales Interactive, Don't Knock Twice has been adapted from the film with the same title, sharing a loosely similar story as the film. The game was released worldwide for the virtual reality platforms PlayStation VR, HTC Vive, and Oculus Rift, as well as versions for Xbox One, PlayStation 4, and Microsoft Windows on September 5, 2017, and another version for the Nintendo Switch was released on October 17, 2017.
