= Joe Sowerbutts =

British actor (born 1988)

- Born: Joseph John Sowerbutts; 1988 (age 37–38); London, UK
- Education: Latymer Upper School, London
- Occupation: Actor
- Years active: 1999–present

Joseph John Sowerbutts (born 1988) is a British actor, who is known for playing the part of Thomas Mortmain in the 2003 film I Capture the Castle and for voicing Harry Potter in Harry Potter and the Philosopher's Stone video game.

== Early life and education ==
He was born Joseph John Sowerbutts in London, England in 1988, to Julia and Kevin Sowerbutts. He was educated at Latymer Upper School, an independent school in Hammersmith, London.

== Career ==
Sowerbutts made his professional acting debut as Miles in the 1999 television film The Turn of the Screw. He would later star in several other television series such as Harry Morant in The Inspector Lynley Mysteries Alex Maclean in Doctors.

He would later star in the 2003 film I Capture the Castle as the character Thomas.

His other television film credits include Young Sexton film in Goodbye, Mr. Chips, Russel in The Lost Prince and Harry Bowden in Doc Martin and the Legend of the Cloutie. He also had a recurring role as Neal in the 2016 film Ghost Nets and had several small parts in various television shows, such as The Lost Prince and Casualty.

Sowerbutts also provided the voice of Harry Potter, Draco Malfoy, Vincent Crabbe and Gregory Goyle in the Harry Potter and the Philosopher's Stone video game.

It has been rumored that in the 2001 film Harry Potter and the Philosopher's Stone, Sowerbutts dubbed several of Daniel Radcliffe's lines in a few scenes after Radcliffe's voice began to break. A spokesperson from Warner Bros. Studios however, denied this claim.

Recently, he starred as Matt in the cinematic interactive movie video game Late Shift.

== Filmography ==
=== Film ===
Year	Title	Role	Notes
2003	I Capture the Castle	Thomas	
2012	Break Time	James	
2014	Parallel Lines	Jake Laris	
2016	Ghost Nets	Neal	
2019	MX: Ihminen	Son	Short film

=== Television ===
Year	Title	Role	Notes
1999	The Turn of the Screw	Miles	Television film
2002	The Inspector Lynley Mysteries	Harry Morant	Episode: "Well Schooled in Murder"
2002	Goodbye, Mr. Chips	Young Sexton	Television film
2003	The Lost Prince	Russell	Television film
2003	Doc Martin and the Legend of the Cloutie	Harry Bowden	Television film
2012	Casualty	Jonas Wiley	2 episodes
2017	Doctors	Alex Maclean	Episode: "Monsters"

=== Video games ===
Year	Title	Role	Notes
2001	Harry Potter and the Sorcerer's Stone	Harry Potter, Draco Malfoy, Vincent Crabbe, Gregory Goyle	
2016	Late Shift	Matt	
