= Five Dates =

2020 video game

- Developers: Wales Interactive, Good Gate Media
- Publisher: Wales Interactive
- Director: Paul Raschid
- Writer: Paul Raschid
- Engine: Unity
- Platforms: Windows, macOS, PlayStation 4, Playstation 5, Xbox One, Nintendo Switch, iOS, Android
- Release: 17 November 2020
- Genres: Romance, full-motion video

Five Dates is a 2020 interactive romance full-motion video game developed by Wales Interactive and Good Gate Media and published by Wales Interactive. It was conceptualised, developed and shot entirely during the United Kingdom's 2020 COVID-19 lockdowns. It was followed in 2023 by a sequel named Ten Dates.

== Overview ==
In this choose-your-own-adventure style video game, the player controls Vinny, a millennial man who joins a video dating app during the COVID-19 lockdowns. Over the course of a playthrough, he virtually interacts with five potential female matches in an attempt to start a relationship.

== Reception ==
Reception

Aggregate scores
Aggregator	Score
Metacritic	(PC) 64/100 (PS4) 79/100 (Switch) 56/100
OpenCritic	42% recommend

Review score
Publication	Score
Nintendo Life	6/10

Five Dates received "generally favorable" reviews, according to review aggregator Metacritic. Fellow review aggregator OpenCritic assessed that the game received fair approval, being recommended by 42% of critics.

CD-Action compared the game positively to romantic sitcoms such as Friends and How I Met Your Mother, praising the cast and the relationship building.

Screen Rant criticized the lack of interactivity, suggesting the game might have been better if it rewarded players for choosing responses based on their memory and on noticing clues in prior interactions.
