= I Capture the Castle (film) =

2003 film by Tim Fywell

- Original British quad format film poster
- Directed by: Tim Fywell
- Screenplay by: Heidi Thomas
- Based on: I Capture the Castle by Dodie Smith
- Produced by: David Parfitt
- Starring: Romola Garai; Rose Byrne; Bill Nighy; Henry Thomas; Marc Blucas; Tara Fitzgerald; Henry Cavill; Joe Sowerbutts
- Cinematography: Richard Greatrex
- Edited by: Roy Sharman
- Music by: Dario Marianelli
- Production companies: Distant Horizon; BBC Films; Trademark Films
- Distributed by: Momentum Pictures
- Release date: 9 May 2003
- Running time: 117 minutes
- Country: United Kingdom
- Language: English
- Budget: $8 million
- Box office: $6.6 million

I Capture the Castle is a 2003 British romantic comedy film directed by Tim Fywell. It is based on the 1948 novel of the same name by Dodie Smith, with the screenplay written by Heidi Thomas. The film was released in the UK on 9 May 2003.

Romola Garai played the lead role of Cassandra Mortmain alongside Bill Nighy, Rose Byrne and Tara Fitzgerald.

== Plot ==
The Mortmain family live in genteel poverty in a decaying English castle, which family patriarch James Mortmain leased years ago to cure his writers' block. James hasn't written anything in 12 years, since the spectacular success of his first novel. The film is narrated by his daughter, 17-year-old Cassandra Mortmain, who develops her writing ability by capturing life in the castle in her journal. Her older sister Rose is beautiful and desires above all to marry for money and escape poverty. Their Bohemian stepmother, Topaz, is an ex-model who sunbathes in the nude. The family is helped by Stephen, the son of the family's former maid, who harbors unrequited romantic feelings for Cassandra.

The family suddenly encounters their new, wealthy American landlord, Simon Cotton, and his brother, Neil. Simon is the heir to his English father's fortune and title. Rose becomes determined to marry Simon, but flirts awkwardly and openly with him when they return for a visit and seemingly ruins her chances.

When the family learns of the death of a wealthy relative, Rose and Cassandra go to London and find they've been left a pair of exotic but unattractive fur coats. They return home to Suffolk and encounter Simon and Neil on the platform and attempt to hide, which amuses the brothers and leads to the families becoming good friends.

With Cassandra and Topaz's help, Rose attracts Simon and he proposes, which incenses Neil, who tells Cassandra that Rose is a gold digger. Rose goes to London with Simon, Topaz and his mother and receives a fashionable makeover and a new wardrobe. She writes to Cassandra, admitting feeling homesick, and listing the many luxuries she's received since her engagement. This alarms Cassandra, as Rose had promised she was truly in love with Simon. Topaz, meanwhile, has begun an affair with an art collector in London.

Simon comes to visit and spends an evening alone with Cassandra. They share a romantic moment and kiss. Cassandra finds herself in love with Simon and is forced to tell Stephen that she doesn't reciprocate his feelings. Heartbroken, Stephen goes to London to pursue a modeling career.

Cassandra goes to London to visit Rose and discovers the engagement has estranged Simon and Neil. Rose is indeed caught up in her fiance's wealth and nonchalantly admits to Cassandra that she isn't in love with Simon but still intends to marry him. The sisters argue, and Rose realizes that Cassandra is in love with Simon.

Cassandra returns home and traps her father in a medieval tower to help him recover his writer's block. After several days, he confesses his immense guilt and grief over the death of his wife and the two reconcile. He slowly begins to write again, and Topaz returns to him.

Simon comes to the castle to tell Cassandra that Rose has vanished. Together, they search for her and soon discover her and Neil in a seaside hotel together. It becomes clear that Rose and Neil had loved each other from the start, but Rose pursued Simon for his money. With the Cotton family's clear disapproval, Rose and Neil marry. Weeks later, Simon approaches Cassandra and invites her to come to America with him. She declines, knowing he still loves Rose, and writes in the final pages of her journal that she knows she will love again some day.

== Production ==
Parts of the film were shot in Laxey film studio on the Isle of Man. Manorbier Castle in Pembrokeshire, Wales, supplied exteriors for the castle, and Eltham Palace in London some interiors.

== Main cast ==
- Romola Garai as Cassandra Mortmain
- Henry Thomas as Simon Cotton
- Rose Byrne as Rose Mortmain
- Bill Nighy as James Mortmain
- Tara Fitzgerald as Topaz Mortmain
- Marc Blucas as Neil Cotton
- Henry Cavill as Stephen Colley
- Sinéad Cusack as Elspeth Cotton
- Joe Sowerbutts as Thomas Mortmain
- James Faulkner as Aubrey Fox-Cotton
- Sarah Woodward as Leda Fox-Cotton
- David Bamber as the Vicar
- Helena Little as Mother

== Reception ==
On the review aggregator website Rotten Tomatoes, 78% of 85 critics' reviews are positive, with an average rating of 6.7/10. The website's consensus reads: "A handsome and charming adaptation of the novel."
