= Blacksmith (character) =

Publication information
- Publisher: DC Comics
- First appearance: Flash: Iron Heights (2001)
- Created by: Geoff Johns, Ethan Van Sciver

In-story information
- Alter ego: Amunet Black
- Species: Metahuman
- Team affiliations: Rogues; Legion of Zoom
- Partnerships: Keith Kenyon (Goldface, ex-husband)
- Abilities: Merge metal with flesh and shape it to her will

Blacksmith (Amunet Black) is a DC Comics supervillain and an enemy of the Flash (Wally West). Blacksmith first appeared in Flash: Iron Heights (2001) and was created by Geoff Johns and Ethan Van Sciver. She is the ex-wife of Goldface.

Blacksmith made her live action debut as a recurring character on season 4 of The Flash, portrayed by Katee Sackhoff.

== Fictional character biography ==
For 15 years, Amunet Black has been running and operating the Network, an underground black market in Central City and Keystone City, the twin cities, for supervillains to buy, sell, or move contraband. During that time, she had a brief marriage to Goldface. When they divorced, she stole the elixir that gave him his powers and changed it to gain the ability to merge metal with flesh and shape it to her will. She was able to keep the Network hidden from the authorities and if any villain reformed or quit crime, she made sure the memories of the Network were erased from their minds. Soon, with a vision of power, Blacksmith planned out her takeover of the twin cities, with her as the leader.

First, she organized a new group of Rogues, which consisted of the Weather Wizard, Mirror Master, Magenta, Murmur, Girder, Plunder, and the Trickster. She made sure that her Rogues were strong and had better control of their powers. She had Magenta use her powers to keep Girder from rusting and taught the Weather Wizard better control of his wand.

Second, she and her Rogues had the Flash's allies removed or incapacitated. Mirror Master framed the Pied Piper for the murder of his parents. Plunder took out Chunk, shot his mirror image Detective Jared Morillo, and assumed his identity. Mirror Master kidnapped Cyborg and police officer Fred Chyre, trapping them in a mirror universe along with all the other cops of Keystone City. The Rogues then removed the speedsters by giving Jesse Quick's company financial trouble and then sent Jay Garrick to a hospital in Denver when his wife got sick. Finally, Murmur and Mirror Master attacked radio stations and reprogrammed their antennas to broadcast a mirror shield around the twin cities to prevent anyone from coming in or going out. After everything had been put into place, Blacksmith and her Rogues launched their takeover and began by attacking the Flash. They attacked hard and fast, which left the Flash tired and badly injured, but just as they were about to finish him off, they were stopped by the Thinker, who wanted to use the Flash's brain to upload information. After the Thinker was defeated, Blacksmith and the rogues resumed their plan and attacked the Flash and Goldface. They successfully trounced the Flash while Goldface escaped. During the fight, Blacksmith used her power to transform her body into ebony metal, while villains in the Network began to loot and pillage the two cities. Luckily, Goldface led the people of the twin cities against the Network and the Flash managed to defeat the Weather Wizard, Mirror Master, and the Trickster, before they escaped when Captain Cold froze the ground and Mirror Master used it to retreat. With her Rogues defeated, she tried a desperate attack by collapsing the bridge that connects Keystone City and Central City. The Flash quickly managed to rebuild the bridge and finally defeat Blacksmith by stranding her on a barge in the middle of the river (she could not enter the water for fear of rusting her metal skin). With her Network discontinued, she was sent to Iron Heights, where she was severely wounded by the escaping Gorilla Grodd.

Although she survived her injuries, Blacksmith has not been seen since that incident, although she did show up for "Digger" Harkness' funeral.

== Powers and abilities ==
Blacksmith's body was mutated to be the perfect fusion between organic and inorganic matter. As a result, she possesses the ability to fuse such materials together.

== In other media ==
Amunet Black appears in The Flash, portrayed by Katee Sackhoff. This version is a former flight attendant named Leslie Jocoy. After gaining the power to telekinetically manipulate anything made of alnico, Jocoy began carrying a quantity of alnico shards, took on the alias of "Amunet Black", and became a crime lord specializing in black market metahuman trafficking. Additionally, she is the ex-girlfriend of fellow crime lord Goldface.
