= Katee Sackhoff =

American actress (born 1980)

- Sackhoff at Dragon Con in 2026
- Born: April 8, 1980 (age 46); Portland, Oregon, U.S.
- Occupation: Actress
- Years active: 1997–present
- Notable work: The Mandalorian, Battlestar Galactica
- Spouse: Robin Gadsby (m. 2021)
- Children: 2
- Website: Official website

Katee Sackhoff (born April 8, 1980) is an American actress known for playing Lieutenant Kara "Starbuck" Thrace on Battlestar Galactica (2003–2009), Victoria "Vic" Moretti on Longmire (2012–2017), Niko Breckenridge on Another Life (2019–2021), and Bo-Katan Kryze on The Mandalorian (2020–2023). She also provided the voice of Bo-Katan in Star Wars: The Clone Wars (2012–2013; 2020), Star Wars Rebels (2017) and Star Wars: Tales of the Empire (2024), as well as the voice of Bitch Pudding on Robot Chicken (2005–present). She was nominated for four Saturn Awards for Battlestar Galactica and won Best Supporting Actress on Television in 2005.

Sackhoff also starred in the short-lived TV series The Fearing Mind (2000–2001) and The Education of Max Bickford (2001–2002). She had recurring roles in the TV series Bionic Woman (2007), Nip/Tuck (2009), and CSI: Crime Scene Investigation (2010–2011). Sackhoff had a lead role in the eighth season of 24 as Dana Walsh (2010). She had recurring roles on The Flash as Blacksmith and appeared twice as herself on The Big Bang Theory.

She had lead roles in the films Halloween: Resurrection (2002), White Noise: The Light (2007), Batman: Year One (2011), The Haunting in Connecticut 2: Ghosts of Georgia (2013), Sexy Evil Genius (2013), Riddick (2013), Oculus (2013), and Don't Knock Twice (2016).

== Early life ==
Sackhoff was born in Portland, Oregon, and grew up in St. Helens, Oregon. Her mother, Mary, was an English-as-second-language (ESL) program coordinator, and her father, Dennis, a land developer. She graduated from Sunset High School in Beaverton in 1998. She began swimming at an early age and by high school planned to pursue a career in the sport until her right knee was injured. This led her to begin practicing yoga—which she continues today—and to pursue an interest in acting.

== Career ==
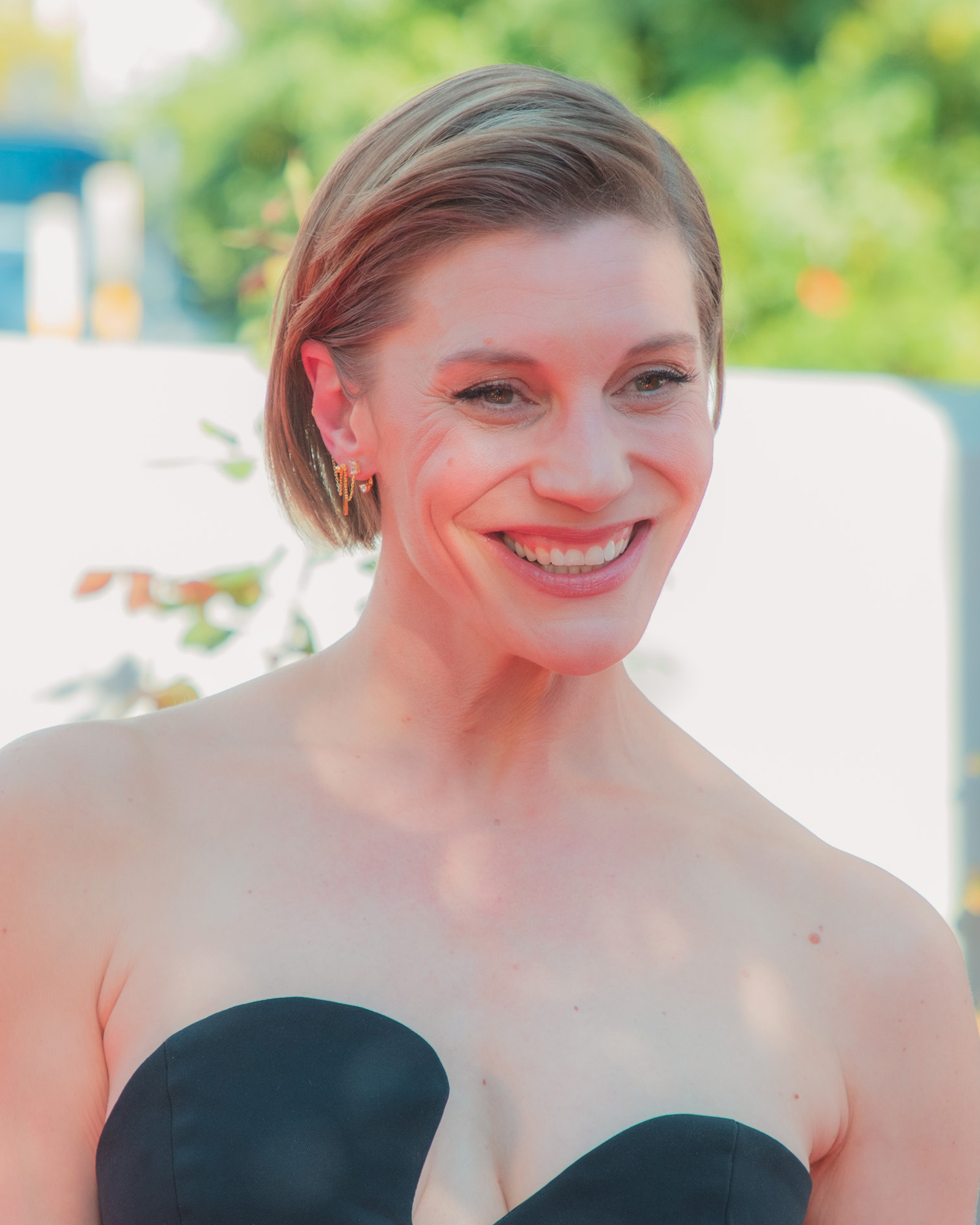
Sackhoff at the 53rd Saturn Awards in 2026

Sackhoff moved to Los Angeles when she was 17 years old. Her first acting role was in the Lifetime film Fifteen and Pregnant (starring Kirsten Dunst), which motivated her to move to Hollywood and pursue an acting career after she graduated from high school. Sackhoff's first recurring role was as Annie in MTV's Undressed; she next won a supporting role as Nell Bickford in The Education of Max Bickford. She made her motion picture debut in My First Mister, then appeared as Jenna "Jen" Danzig in Halloween: Resurrection.

Sackhoff's most widely known role is as Kara "Starbuck" Thrace in the miniseries and follow-up TV series Battlestar Galactica, for which she won a Saturn Award in 2006 for Best Actress on Television. Her persona led the writers to develop the character as more complex and volatile. Galactica's executive producer Ron Moore described Sackhoff as having "magnetism"; and producer David Eick said, "We saw this whole other side that was all because of Katee: vulnerability, insecurity, desperation. We started freeing ourselves up to explore the weakness of the character because we knew Katee could express those things without compromising the character's strength." Sackhoff said her performance was inspired by Linda Hamilton's portrayal of Sarah Connor in Terminator 2: Judgment Day: "I think that was the one character that I kind of looked to as far as body image and strength. I think I looked to her character and said, 'OK, that's kind of what you need to embody.'" Toward the end of the filming of Battlestar Galactica, Sackhoff began feeling physically weak. Soon after filming wrapped, she was diagnosed with thyroid cancer. After surgery to remove her thyroid, she required no radiation treatments and by February 2009 was in remission.

In 2007, Sackhoff was cast as the evil cyborg Sarah Corvus in the short-lived NBC series Bionic Woman. David Eick, the show's executive producer, said, "[Sackhoff is] a very special find. Those actors who can combine the qualities of strength and vulnerability—they usually call those people movie stars." Sackhoff plays the female lead in the action/sci-fi film The Last Sentinel and the supernatural thriller White Noise: The Light.

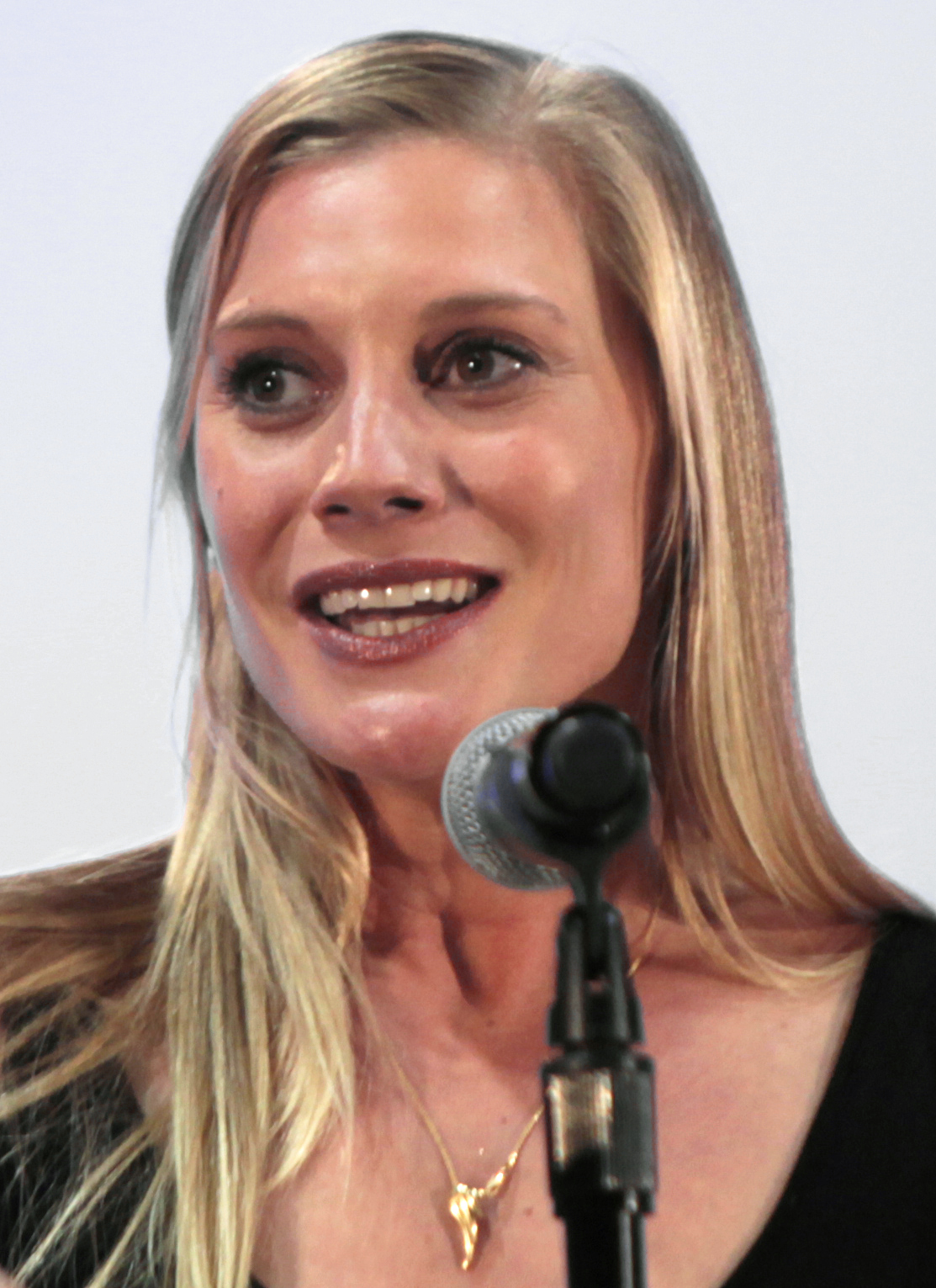
Sackhoff in 2015

Sackhoff appears as the main character in the Lifetime film How I Married My High School Crush. She has made guest appearances in Cold Case, ER, Law & Order, and Robot Chicken. Sackhoff provided the voice of a female marine in the video game Halo 3 and is featured in the viral marketing campaign for Resistance 2. In 2011, she provided the voice for Black Cat 2099 in Spider-Man: Edge of Time. She voiced Sarah Essen in the DC Comics animated film, Batman: Year One. She appears in four episodes of the fifth season of the series Nip/Tuck playing a new doctor, Dr. Theodora Rowe. However, for the sixth season Sackhoff was replaced by Rose McGowan for the role due to scheduling conflicts. Sackhoff headlined NBC's Dick Wolf-produced cop drama Lost and Found as Tessa, "an offbeat female LAPD detective who, after butting heads with the higher-ups, is sent as a punishment to the basement to work on John Doe and Jane Doe cases." The pilot was filmed in January 2009. NBC decided not to pick up the series. In 2009, she appeared as herself in The Big Bang Theory episode "The Vengeance Formulation", being fantasized as Howard Wolowitz's dream girl. She appears again in season 4, in the same role. Sackhoff appeared as a series regular in the eighth season of the TV series 24, playing Dana Walsh, a CTU data analyst with a secret.

In February 2010, Sackhoff signed on to play the lead in an ABC crime drama pilot, Boston's Finest. ABC decided not to pick up the series.

She made a special appearance in the Futurama episode "Lrrreconcilable Ndndifferences". In the fall of 2010, Sackhoff joined the cast of CSI: Crime Scene Investigation as Detective Reed, a smart investigator who does not do well with sensitivity. In 2011, Sackhoff guest starred in an episode of Workaholics as a homeless drug addict named Rachel.

From 2012 to 2017, Sackhoff co-starred as the lead female role in Longmire, an A&E/Netflix television series based on the novels by Craig Johnson. Sackhoff played Sheriff's Deputy Vic Moretti.

From 2012, Sackhoff provided voice acting for the Lucasfilm Animation series Star Wars: The Clone Wars, in which she played Bo-Katan Kryze, member of the revolutionary Mandalorian Death Watch and Nite Owls. She reprised this role in the sequel to the series, Star Wars Rebels, and in the seventh season of the original series produced by Disney+ in 2020. Also in 2020, Sackhoff appeared as Bo-Katan Kryze in the Disney+ live action original series The Mandalorian.

Sackhoff played Dahl, a mercenary hired to track down Vin Diesel's intergalactic convict character in Riddick.

In August 2012, Sackhoff became the cohost of the Toad Hop Network podcast Schmoes Know Movies. One of her first shows was with guest Sean Astin.

Sackhoff announced in April 2015 a new TV series project, Rain, which she wrote and is executive-producing through her Fly Free Productions. She also had a role in the video game Call of Duty: Black Ops III, performing voice over and motion capture as Sarah Hall. She portrayed Pink Ranger Kimberly in Power/Rangers, a short depicting a dystopian future in the Power Rangers universe.

In 2017, Sackhoff joined The CW series The Flash in the recurring role of villain Blacksmith for its fourth season, billed as a special guest star.

On April 26, 2018, it was announced that Sackhoff was cast in a main role on the Netflix science-fiction drama series, Another Life. It ran for two seasons from 2019 to 2021. Sackhoff announced its cancellation in February 2022.

In 2023, she launched her podcast called Blah Blah Blah with Katee Sackhoff. After a rebranding, the podcast was relaunched on April 23, 2024, under the name The Sackhoff Show. At the end of December 2025, Sackhoff announced that The Sackhoff Show would be pivoting to primarily become a Battlestar Galactica rewatch podcast.

== Personal life ==
Sackhoff and her Battlestar Galactica co-star Tricia Helfer co-founded the Acting Outlaws, a motorcycle-riding charity with which they have worked to raise awareness and funds for causes including the Gulf Restoration Network, the Humane Society, and the Red Cross amfAR.

From 2014 to 2018, she was in a relationship with actor Karl Urban.

In 2018, Sackhoff met actor Robin Gadsby in Vancouver, British Columbia. The couple married in October 2021 and have a daughter and son together.

Sackhoff has ADHD and takes medication for it, as revealed on her episode of the Family Trips with the Meyers Brothers broadcast.

Sackhoff moved back to Oregon in 2024, with her husband and their children.

== Filmography ==
Key
†	Denotes films that have not yet been released

=== Film ===
Year	Title	Role	Notes
2001	My First Mister	Ashley	
2002	Halloween: Resurrection	Jen Danzig	
2007	White Noise: The Light	Sherry Clarke	
2007	The Last Sentinel	Girl	
2011	Batman: Year One	Sarah Essen	Voice; direct-to-video
2012	A Deadly Obsession	Suzanne Hollander	
2013	The Haunting in Connecticut 2: Ghosts of Georgia	Joyce	
2013	Sexy Evil Genius	Nikki Franklyn	
2013	Riddick	Dahl	
2013	Oculus	Marie Russell	
2014	Tell	Beverley	
2015	Power/Rangers	Kimberly Scott (née Hart)	Short film
2016	Girl Flu.	Jenny Styles	
2016	Don't Knock Twice	Jess	
2018	2036 Origin Unknown	Mackenzie "Mack" Wilson	
2021	Night of the Animated Dead	Judy	Voice
2021	Batman: The Long Halloween – Part Two	Pamela Isley / Poison Ivy	Voice; direct-to-video
2024	Justice League: Crisis on Infinite Earths – Part Three	Pamela Isley / Poison Ivy	Voice; direct-to-video
2024	Watchmen Chapter I	Laurie Juspeczyk / Silk Spectre	Voice; direct-to-video
2024	Watchmen Chapter II	Laurie Juspeczyk / Silk Spectre	Voice; direct-to-video
2025	Fight or Flight	Katherine Brunt	

=== Television ===
Year	Title	Role	Notes
1998	Fifteen and Pregnant	Karen Gotarus	Television film
1999	Locust Valley	Claire Shaw	Television film
1999	Zoe, Duncan, Jack and Jane	Susan	Episode: "Sympathy for Jack"
1999	Chicken Soup for the Soul	Claire	Episode: "Starlight, Star Bright"
1999	Hefner: Unauthorized	Mary	Television film
2000	Undressed	Annie	4 episodes
2000–2001	The Fearing Mind	Lenore Fearing	Main role
2001–2002	The Education of Max Bickford	Nell Bickford	Main role
2002	ER	Jason's Girlfriend	Episode: "A Hopeless Wound"
2003	Battlestar Galactica	Kara "Starbuck" Thrace	Miniseries
2003	Boomtown	Holly	Episode: "The Big Picture"
2004	Cold Case	Terri Maxwell (1969)	Episode: "Volunteers"
2004–2009	Battlestar Galactica	Kara "Starbuck" Thrace	Main role
2007	How I Married My High School Crush	Sara Jacob	Television film
2007	Bionic Woman	Sarah Corvus	Recurring role
2007	Battlestar Galactica: Razor	Kara "Starbuck" Thrace	Direct-to-DVD movie
2007–2022	Robot Chicken	Bitch Pudding / various characters	Voice; 14 episodes
2008; 2024	Law & Order	Dianne Cary	Episode: "Knock Off"
2008; 2024	Law & Order	Vanessa Gallo	Episode: "Big Brother"
2009	Lost and Found	Tessa Cooper	Pilot
2009	Nip/Tuck	Theodora "Teddy" Rowe	Recurring role
2009–2010	The Big Bang Theory	Herself	2 episodes
2010	Boston's Finest	Julia Scott	Television film
2010	24	Dana Walsh / Jenny Scott	Main role (season 8)
2010	Futurama	Grrrl	Voice; episode: "Lrrreconcilable Ndndifferences"
2010–2011	CSI: Crime Scene Investigation	Frankie Reed	3 episodes
2011	The Super Hero Squad Show	She-Hulk	Voice; episode: "So Pretty When They Explode!"
2011	The Cleveland Show	Herself	Voice; episode: "Hot Cocoa Bang Bang"
2011	Workaholics	Rachel	Episode: "Karl's Wedding"
2012–2013; 2020	Star Wars: The Clone Wars	Bo-Katan Kryze	Voice; 9 episodes
2012–2017	Longmire	Victoria "Vic" Moretti	Main role
2017	Star Wars Rebels	Bo-Katan Kryze	Voice; 2 episodes
2017–2020	The Flash	Amunet Black / Blacksmith	Recurring role; season 4 and 6
2019–2021	Another Life	Niko Breckinridge	Main cast; also producer (season 1) and executive producer (season 2)
2020–2023	The Mandalorian	Bo-Katan Kryze	Main role (season 3); recurring role (season 2)
2021	Christmas Sail	Liz Darling	Television film
2021	The Bleepin' Robot Chicken Archie Comics Special	Bitch Pudding	Voice; Television special
2024	Star Wars: Tales of the Empire	Bo-Katan Kryze	Voice; episode: "The Path of Hate"
2025	Robot Chicken: Self Discovery Special	Bitch Pudding	Voice; television special
2026	Robot Chicken Adult Swim Special	Bitch Pudding	Voice; television special
2026	Lego Star Wars: The Mandalorian	Bo-Katan Kryze	Voice; television special
2026	Carrie	Amanda	2 episodes

=== Video games ===
Year	Title	Voice role	Notes
2007	Halo 3	Female Marine 3	
2008	Resistance 2	Cassie Aklin	
2011	Spider-Man: Edge of Time	Black Cat 2099	
2015	Call of Duty: Black Ops III	Sarah Hall	Also motion-capture
2016	Eve: Valkyrie	Rán Kavik	
2018	Call of Duty: Black Ops 4	Sarah Hall	
2025	ARK: Survival Ascended Lost Colony Expansion Pack	Diana Altaras	

=== Audio ===
Year	Title	Role	Notes
2021	The Division: Hearts on Fire	Melanie Hoskins	Audio drama based on the video game series.

== Awards and nominations ==
Year	Award	Category	Nominated work	Result
2003	Saturn Awards	Best Supporting Actress on Television	Battlestar Galactica	Nominated
2005	Saturn Awards	Best Supporting Actress on Television	Battlestar Galactica	Won
2006	Saturn Awards	Best Actress on Television	Battlestar Galactica	Nominated
2008	Saturn Awards	Best Supporting Actress on Television	Battlestar Galactica	Nominated
2024	Saturn Awards	Best Supporting Actress on Television	The Mandalorian	Nominated
2010	Teen Choice Awards	Choice TV Actress: Action	24	Nominated
2015	Fangoria Chainsaw Awards	Best Supporting Actress	Oculus	Won
