= Tobias Weber =

Swiss film director

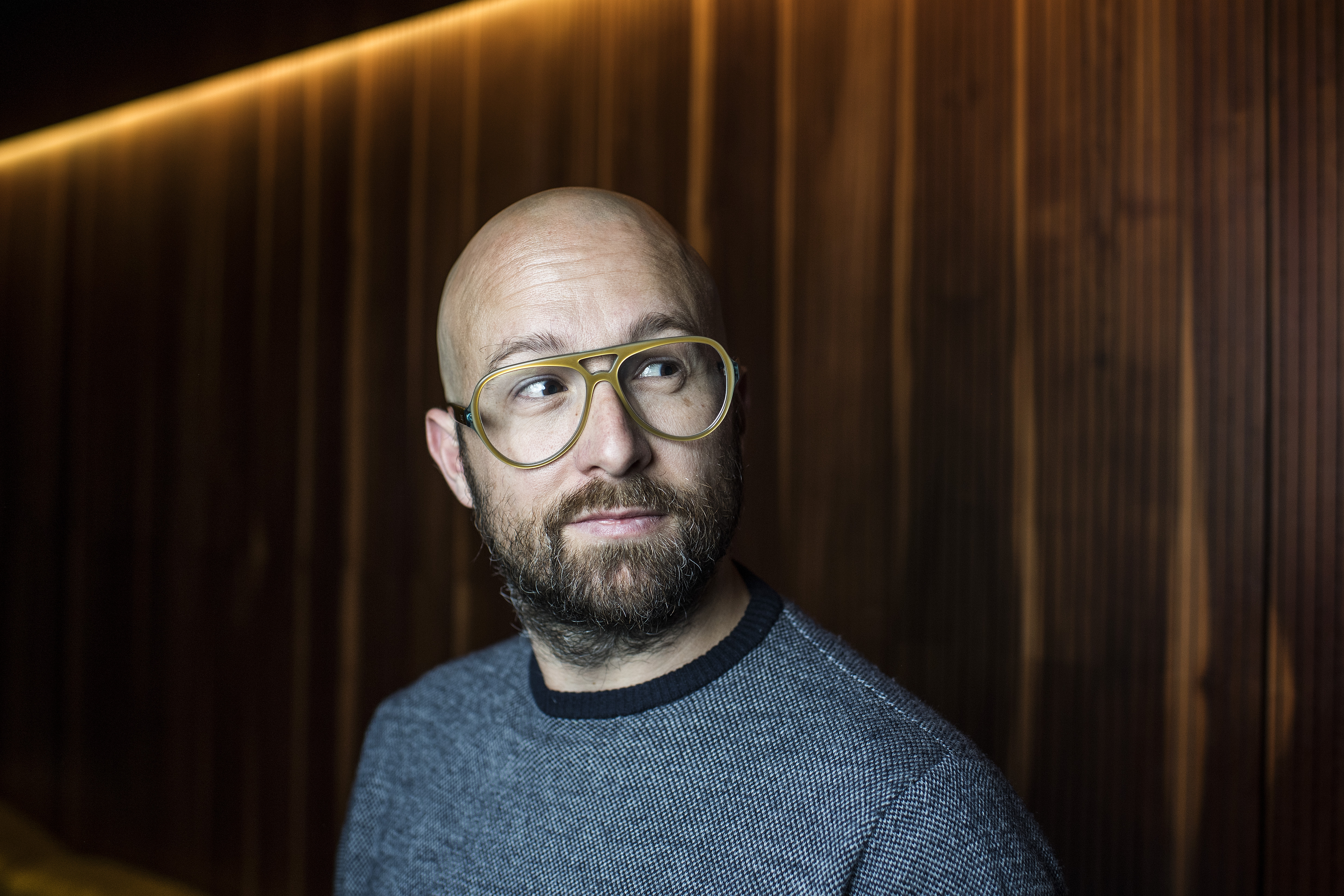
- Tobias Weber Director by Valeriano Di Domenico
- Born: 14 February 1977 (age 49); Zürich, Switzerland
- Education: London Film School
- Occupations: Director; Screenwriter; Technology Entrepreneur
- Years active: 2002–present
- Spouse: Rahel Weber-Ingold (m. 2011)
- Children: 3
- Parents: Phyllis Weber-Niederer; Max Weber-Niederer

Tobias Weber (born 14 February 1977) is a Swiss film director, screenwriter and technology entrepreneur. He is best known for directing the interactive feature film Late Shift (2016), for which he won the BAFTA Cymru award. He is the founder of participative motion picture technology company CtrlMovie AG and Los Angeles based production company Kino Industries.

== Biography ==
Weber grew up in Switzerland and studied filmmaking at London Film School.

Working as a commercial director he was looking for alternative forms of advertising and branded entertainment, when he re-discovered his fascination with multi-branched storytelling that rooted in the adventure games he played and choose your own adventure books he read as a kid, a format that he now applied to movies.

He shot an interactive proof of concept film in 2013 and set up interactive movie technology company CtrlMovie AG the year after. In 2015 he shot Late Shift in London, the interactive feature-length film that he wrote together with Michael Robert Johnson. The film was first released in 2016 at the Cannes Film Festival (Next), travelled on to festivals such as the New York Film Festival, Raindance and the Locarno International Film Festival and won multiple awards including a BAFTA Cymru award.

The CtrlMovie technology was subsequently adopted by Hollywood studios such as Paramount Pictures, 20th Century Fox and Amblin Partners.

Together with his partners Tobias Weber runs CtrlMovie AG as well as Los Angeles based production company Kino Industries LLC.

== Filmography ==
Year	Title	Director	Writer	Notes
2017	Late Shift	Yes	Yes	BAFTA Cymru Award for Best Game
