= Attack of the Earthlings =

2018 video game

- Developer: Team Junkfish
- Publishers: Team Junkfish; Wales Interactive
- Platforms: Linux; macOS; Windows; PlayStation 4; Xbox One
- Release: Windows; WW: February 8, 2018; PS4, Xbox One; WW: March 5, 2019
- Genre: Turn-based tactics
- Mode: Single-player

Attack of the Earthlings is a turn-based tactics video game developed by Team Junkfish. It was published for Linux, macOS, and Windows in 2018, and Wales Interactive published it for the PlayStation 4 and Xbox One in 2019.

== Gameplay ==
Players control an alien insectoid queen whose planet has been colonized by humans. Players must fight off the humans and destroy their drill, which is stripping the planet of resources. Combat is turn-based and tactical. Although humans are weak, they have greater numbers and powerful weapons. Players initially control only the queen, but they can create more units by eating humans and hatching spawn. The spawn can be given skills that based on power, stealth, or crowd control.

== Development ==
Team Junkfish, an independent studio in Scotland, published Attack of the Earthlings for Windows in February 2018. Wales Interactive published it for PlayStation 4 and Xbox One on March 5, 2019.

== Reception ==
Attack of the Earthlings received mixed reviews on Metacritic. GameSpot praised the humor, writing, and unit differentiation, but they said the premise wears thin after a while. They recommended it to players who are not looking for a deep tactical experience and are interested in following a story that is not particularly malleable. Digitally Downloaded said the level design leaves players with limited choices and replayability but increases the immersion of being the antagonist in a science fiction film. They recommended it to people looking for more narrative and humor than the typical strategy game. Bit-Tech called it "competent and engaging" but said it is a bit short.
