= Harry Potter (character) =

Protagonist of the Harry Potter literature and film series

- Harry Potter character
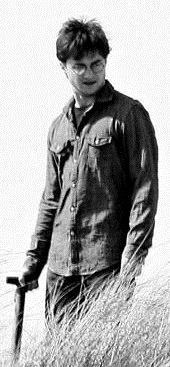
- Daniel Radcliffe as Harry Potter on the set of Harry Potter and the Deathly Hallows – Part 2
- First appearance: Harry Potter and the Philosopher's Stone (1997)
- Created by: J. K. Rowling
- Portrayed by: Daniel Radcliffe (films); Dominic McLaughlin (television series)
- Voiced by: Joe Sowerbutts (Note: Philosopher's Stone video games (PlayStation, PC and GBA)); Harry Robinson (Note: Chamber of Secrets and Prisoner of Azkaban video games, Quidditch World Cup); Josh Jamieson (Note: Philosopher's Stone 2003 video game); Daniel Larner (Note: Goblet of Fire video game and some lines in Order of the Phoenix video game); Adam Sopp (Note: Order of the Phoenix, Half-Blood Prince, Deathly Hallows – Part 1 and Deathly Hallows – Part 2 video games, Harry Potter for Kinect); Kyle McCarley (Note: Wizards Unite); Frankie Treadaway (Note: first three Full-Cast Audio Editions); Jaxon Knopf (Note: remaining four Full-Cast Audio Editions); Sam Stafford (Note: Final chapter in Deathly Hallows Full-Cast Audio Edition)

In-universe information
- Full name: Harry James Potter
- Family: Lily Potter (mother); James Potter (father)
- Spouse: Ginny Weasley
- Children: James Sirius Potter; Albus Severus Potter; Lily Luna Potter
- Relatives: Petunia Dursley (aunt); Vernon Dursley (uncle); Dudley Dursley (cousin)
- Nationality: British
- House: Gryffindor
- Born: 31 July 1980

Harry Potter is a fictional character and the protagonist of the Harry Potter series of novels by J. K. Rowling. The plot of the seven-book series chronicles seven years in the life of the orphan Harry, who, on his eleventh birthday, learns he is a wizard. He attends Hogwarts, a school of magic, where he receives guidance from the headmaster Albus Dumbledore and becomes friends with Ron Weasley and Hermione Granger. Harry learns that during his infancy, the dark wizard Lord Voldemort murdered his parents but was unable to kill him as well. The plot of the series revolves around Harry's struggle to adapt to the wizarding world and defeat Voldemort.

Harry is regarded as a fictional icon and has been described by critics and publications as one of the greatest characters of all time. He is portrayed by Daniel Radcliffe in all eight Harry Potter films, and will be played by Dominic McLaughlin in the upcoming television series. Harry also appears in the play Harry Potter and the Cursed Child, which has been produced on stage since 2016.

== Character ==
According to Rowling, the idea for Harry Potter and the novel series came to her while she was waiting for a train in 1990. She first conceived of Harry as a "scrawny, black-haired, bespectacled boy" who is unaware that he is a wizard. While developing ideas for the first book, she decided to make Harry an orphan who attends a boarding school called Hogwarts. She explained in a 1999 interview with The Guardian: "Harry had to be an orphan—so that he's a free agent, with no fear of letting down his parents, disappointing them ... Then there's the security. Having a child of my own reinforces my belief that children above all want security, and that's what Hogwarts offers Harry."

The death of Rowling's mother in December 1990 inspired her to write Harry as a boy longing for his dead parents. She explained that his anguish became deeper and "much more real" than in earlier drafts of the first book because she related to it herself. In a 2000 interview, Rowling said that the character Wart in T. H. White's novel The Once and Future King is Harry's "spiritual ancestor". Although Rowling gave Harry her own birth date of 31 July, she maintains that he is not directly based on any real-life person. She says that he came "out of a part of [her]".

In the novels, Harry is described as having his father's perpetually untidy black hair, his mother's bright green eyes, and a lightning bolt-shaped scar on his forehead. At the beginning of the series, he is short and skinny for his age, but in later novels he grows enough that other characters describe him as tall. Harry has a thin face and "knobbly" knees, and he wears Windsor glasses, which Rowling said point to his vulnerability. When asked about the meaning behind Harry's scar, Rowling said she wanted him to be "physically marked by what he has been through". She said the scar is "an outward expression of what he has been through inside".

Rowling has described Harry as honourable. She says that he is strongly guided by his own conscience, and has a keen feeling of what is right and wrong. In her eyes, he is competitive but not cruel, and he is a fighter who refuses to take abuse. She calls him a normal boy who has qualities most people admire, which makes him a hero in her view, and very likeable. She has claimed that Harry is a suitable role model for real-world children.

Rowling admits that Harry sometimes makes mistakes, and she says his character flaws include anger and impulsiveness. She said that because he has limited access to caring adults, he is forced to make his own choices at a younger age than most people. According to Rowling, a pivotal moment in Harry's life occurs in the fourth novel, when he protects the body of Cedric Diggory from Voldemort, because it shows he is brave and selfless.

== Appearances ==
=== Novels ===
==== Harry Potter and the Philosopher's Stone ====
Harry is first introduced in Harry Potter and the Philosopher's Stone (1997) as an orphan living with his abusive aunt and uncle, Vernon and Petunia Dursley, and their bullying son, Dudley. On his eleventh birthday, Harry discovers he is a wizard when Rubeus Hagrid brings him an acceptance letter from Hogwarts School of Witchcraft and Wizardry. Harry learns that his parents, James and Lily Potter, were murdered by a powerful Dark wizard, Lord Voldemort, who also tried to kill Harry. However, Voldemort's killing curse bounced back and apparently destroyed him, leaving Harry with a lightning-bolt-shaped scar on his forehead. Due to his miraculous survival, Harry became famous among wizards.

Hagrid takes Harry to Diagon Alley to shop for school supplies. Harry buys a wand, and the proprietor tells him that his wand and Voldemort's wand contain feathers from the same phoenix. At the end of the summer, Harry boards the Hogwarts Express, where he befriends Ron Weasley and meets Hermione Granger. When he arrives at Hogwarts, he is assigned to Gryffindor House by the Sorting Hat. During the school year, he receives guidance from the Transfiguration professor Minerva McGonagall and the headmaster Albus Dumbledore. He develops animosity towards a fellow first-year named Draco Malfoy, and becomes increasingly wary of the Potions professor, Severus Snape. Harry and Ron become friends with Hermione after they save her from a troll, and Harry becomes the youngest Seeker on the Gryffindor Quidditch team in a century.

During Christmas holidays, Harry receives an anonymous gift – his father's invisibility cloak. Aided by the cloak, he is able to explore the school freely. He, Ron and Hermione decide to enter a trapdoor they discovered one night, which is guarded by an enormous three-headed dog. They believe a valuable magical object, the Philosopher's Stone, lies beyond the door. After they navigate a series of obstacles, Harry faces Professor Quirrell, whose body has been possessed by Voldemort. When Harry obtains the Stone, Quirrell tries to kill him. However, Quirrell's flesh burns upon contact with Harry's skin, and Harry passes out.

Harry awakens in the Hogwarts infirmary, where Dumbledore explains that Harry was protected by his mother's love, which also killed Quirrell. Voldemort survived, and the Philosopher's Stone was destroyed. During the school's end-of-year feast, Gryffindor is awarded the House Cup thanks to the many points Harry and his friends obtained from their adventure.

==== Harry Potter and the Chamber of Secrets ====
In Harry Potter and the Chamber of Secrets (1998), Muggle-born students are being Petrified in the Hogwarts castle. Some students suspect that Harry is behind the attacks, which alienates him from his peers. Harry learns that he shares Voldemort's ability to communicate with snakes, and he begins to question whether he is worthy of Gryffindor House. After Ron's sister Ginny disappears, Harry enters the Chamber of Secrets to rescue her. He battles Tom Riddle, a version of Voldemort that lives in a diary which had possessed Ginny. In addition to Riddle, Harry encounters the basilisk which has been attacking students. To defeat it, Harry summons the Sword of Gryffindor from the Sorting Hat. After Harry triumphs over the basilisk and saves Ginny, Dumbledore reassures him that he is worthy of Gryffindor.

==== Harry Potter and the Prisoner of Azkaban ====
Near the beginning of Harry Potter and the Prisoner of Azkaban (1999), Harry becomes angry after his Aunt Marge disparages his parents. He accidentally inflates her with magic, then runs away from home. As he re-enters the wizarding community, he learns about Sirius Black, a notorious killer who escaped from the wizard prison Azkaban. On the train to Hogwarts, Harry is assaulted by Dementors, which cause him to relive his worst memories. During a Care of Magical Creatures lesson with Hagrid, Draco is injured after provoking a hippogriff named Buckbeak. As a result, the Ministry of Magic sentences Buckbeak to death. After Harry has more encounters with Dementors, he asks the new Defence Against the Dark Arts professor, Remus Lupin, to help him ward them off. Lupin teaches Harry the Patronus charm, which Harry struggles to master.

While in the village of Hogsmeade, Harry learns that his parents were betrayed by Sirius, their friend and Harry's godfather, and that Sirius also killed Peter Pettigrew. After Ron is taken to the Shrieking Shack by a wild dog, Harry and Hermione give chase and realize the dog is Sirius in Animagus form. Lupin arrives, and he and Sirius explain that Sirius did not kill Pettigrew. They also reveal that Ron's pet rat, Scabbers, is Pettigrew. Lupin then transforms into a werewolf and injures Sirius, and Pettigrew escapes amid the chaos. A swarm of Dementors appear, but they are driven off by a Patronus cast by a mysterious figure.

Awakening in the school infirmary, Harry and Hermione learn that Sirius is being held captive in Hogwarts and is awaiting the Dementor's Kiss. At Dumbledore's advice, they use a Time-Turner to travel back in time to the moment before Buckbeak's execution. After they save the hippogriff, Harry notices the past versions of himself, Hermione, and Sirius being attacked by Dementors. He conjures a strong Patronus to fight them off, then realizes that he was the mysterious figure who appeared earlier. Harry and Hermione free Sirius, who flies away on Buckbeak, still a wanted fugitive. Harry and Hermione then return to their original timeline.

==== Harry Potter and the Goblet of Fire ====
In Harry Potter and the Goblet of Fire (2000), Harry is mysteriously chosen by the Goblet of Fire to compete in the dangerous Triwizard Tournament, even though another Hogwarts champion, Cedric Diggory, has already been selected. During the Tournament's final challenge, Harry and Cedric are transported to a graveyard, where Cedric is killed by Peter Pettigrew. Voldemort, aided by Pettigrew, uses Harry's blood to resurrect his body. Harry then duels Voldemort, and their wands connect. Spirit echoes of Voldemort's victims, including Harry's parents, emerge from his wand. The spirits protect Harry as he escapes to Hogwarts with Cedric's body.

Rowling said it was necessary to depict violence and death in this novel because it allows Harry's bravery and compassion to show. She said that Harry's effort to prevent Cedric's body from falling into Voldemort's hands was based on the scene in Homer's Iliad where Achilles retrieves the corpse of his friend Patroclus from his enemy Hector. She stated that Goblet of Fire marks a turning point in Harry's life—he has been "very protected until now" but now he is no longer protected.

==== Harry Potter and the Order of the Phoenix ====
In Harry Potter and the Order of the Phoenix (2003), the Ministry of Magic wages a smear campaign against Harry and Dumbledore, disputing their claims that Voldemort has returned. The Ministry appoints Dolores Umbridge as the new Defence Against the Dark Arts teacher. Because the Ministry suspects that Dumbledore is building a student army, Umbridge refuses to teach students practical defensive magic. Harry, Hermione and Ron subsequently form a secret group called Dumbledore's Army to teach students defensive spells. The group is disbanded, however, when one student informs Umbridge about it. To shield his students from punishment, Dumbledore falsely claims that Dumbledore's Army was his idea. As a result, he is ousted from his position as headmaster and replaced with Umbridge.

During this time, Harry's increasingly angry and erratic behaviour nearly estranges him from Ron and Hermione. He suffers another emotional blow when his godfather Sirius is killed by the Death Eater Bellatrix Lestrange during a battle at the Department of Mysteries. Also present is Voldemort, who tries to possess Harry so Dumbledore will kill him. This ruse fails, and Harry and Dumbledore thwart Voldemort's plan to steal an important prophecy. Later, Dumbledore explains to Harry that Voldemort chose Harry as his equal, and that either he or Voldemort must eventually kill the other. A subplot of the novel involves Harry's romance with Cho Chang, which quickly unravels.

Rowling said she put Harry through extreme emotional stress in Order of the Phoenix to show his emotional vulnerability and humanity, which contrast with Voldemort's inhumanity.

==== Harry Potter and the Half-Blood Prince ====
In Harry Potter and the Half-Blood Prince (2005), Dumbledore brings Harry along as he attempts to persuade Horace Slughorn to rejoin the Hogwarts faculty as the Potions professor. Harry excels in Slughorn's class after he begins using an old textbook that once belonged to someone known as "The Half-Blood Prince". Outside of class, Dumbledore uses the Pensieve to teach Harry about Voldemort's life and his rise to power. Harry and Dumbledore learn that Voldemort created six Horcruxes to gain immortality, and that they must be destroyed before Voldemort can be killed. Harry repeatedly warns Dumbledore that Draco Malfoy is an agent of Voldemort, but Dumbledore refuses to take action against Draco. He tells Harry that he already knows more about what is happening than Harry does. During the course of the novel, Harry becomes romantically involved with Ginny.

Near the end of the book, Dumbledore and Harry enter a cave in search of a Horcrux. Dumbledore drinks a potion inside the Horcrux's container and begins to scream in agony. When Harry attempts to retrieve some lake water for Dumbledore to drink, he is attacked by Inferi. They try to drown Harry, but Dumbledore rescues him. Dumbledore and Harry then return to the Hogwarts Astronomy Tower with the Horcrux. Dumbledore asks Harry not to interfere in the events that are about to take place, and puts him in a body-binding curse. Immobilized, Harry is unable to intervene as Snape arrives and kills Dumbledore. Later, Harry ends his relationship with Ginny to protect her from Voldemort.

Rowling said that Harry's tumultuous puberty in the novel is based on her own difficult teenage years and those of her sister. She said that after Half-Blood Prince Harry becomes "battle-hardened" and is ready to fight and take revenge against Voldemort and Snape.

==== Harry Potter and the Deathly Hallows ====
Harry, Ron, and Hermione leave Hogwarts in Harry Potter and the Deathly Hallows (2007) to search for and demolish Voldemort's four remaining Horcruxes. They must be destroyed with basilisk venom, the Sword of Gryffindor, or some other powerful means. Ron, Hermione, Vincent Crabbe and Neville Longbottom each destroy one of these Horcruxes. After a battle at Hogwarts, Harry goes into the Forbidden Forest to meet Voldemort, who uses the Elder Wand to cast the Killing Curse on Harry. The curse stuns Harry into a deathlike state, and he finds himself in an ethereal realm with Dumbledore. The deceased headmaster tells Harry that he is a Horcrux that Voldemort unknowingly created. There was a part of Voldemort's soul inside Harry, but it was destroyed by the curse Voldemort cast moments ago. Harry subsequently returns to the living world and duels with Voldemort. Voldemort uses the Killing Curse again, but it rebounds and kills him. Harry, not Voldemort, was the true master of the Elder Wand, and the wand did not wish to harm its master. Harry decides to leave the Elder Wand in Dumbledore's tomb and the Resurrection Stone hidden in the forest, but he keeps the Invisibility Cloak.

In the epilogue, set nineteen years after Voldemort's death, Harry and Ginny are a married couple and have three children: James Sirius Potter, Albus Severus Potter and Lily Luna Potter. Albus is departing for his first year at Hogwarts, and is worried that he will be sorted into Slytherin. Harry explains to him that not all Slytherins are bad, and that his life will be shaped by his own choices.

Rowling said the death of Harry's owl Hedwig in Deathly Hallows represents a loss of innocence and security. She said that Hedwig's death upset many readers.

=== Film adaptations ===
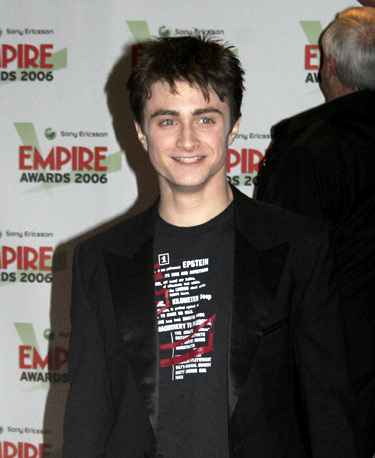
Daniel Radcliffe in 2006

Harry is portrayed by Daniel Radcliffe in all eight Harry Potter film adaptations. Radcliffe was asked to audition for the role in 2000 by David Heyman, who was producing the first film in the series. Radcliffe met Heyman while attending a London play called Stones in His Pockets.

In a 2007 interview with MTV, Radcliffe described the development of his character during the course of the series: "That's what the films are about for me: a loss of innocence, going from being a young kid in awe of the world around him, to someone who is more battle-hardened by the end of it." Radcliffe said that after the death of Cedric Diggory in Goblet of Fire, Harry experiences survivor's guilt and feels immense loneliness. Because of this, Radcliffe talked to a bereavement counsellor to help him prepare for the role. Radcliffe stated that the question he has most frequently been asked is how Harry Potter has influenced his life, to which he regularly answers it has been "fine". He felt it was a tremendous privilege to play Harry, and he did not feel pigeonholed by the role.

In 2011, Empire magazine ranked Radcliffe's Harry Potter as the 36th greatest film character of all time. The magazine published another character ranking in 2018, this time placing Harry at 67th.

=== Stage adaptation ===
Harry Potter and the Cursed Child is a play written by Jack Thorne from a story by Thorne, J. K. Rowling and John Tiffany. It takes place nineteen years after the events of Deathly Hallows. In the play, Harry is Head of the Department of Magical Law Enforcement at the Ministry of Magic. The story focuses on Harry's son, Albus Severus Potter.

=== Television adaptation ===
Harry is set to be portrayed by Scottish actor Dominic McLaughlin in the upcoming HBO Max television series Harry Potter in 2026.

== Reception ==
In 2002, Book magazine ranked Harry Potter No. 85 among the "100 Best Fictional Characters since 1900". Entertainment Weekly ranked him number 2 on its 2010 "100 Greatest Characters of the Last 20 Years" list, saying "Long after we've turned the last page and watched the last end credit, Harry still feels like someone we know. And that's the most magical thing about him." Harry was ranked number 36 on Empire's 2008 list of "100 Greatest Movie Characters of All Time". IGN said that Harry was their favourite Harry Potter character, calling him a "sympathetic figure". The Reverend John Killinger has called the Harry Potter series "the Christ story of the 21st century", and has argued that Harry is a Christ figure. Rowling revealed in 2007 that she was inspired by Christian themes when writing the novels.

Harry has also received criticism. In 2010, he was voted the 35th "Worst Briton" on Channel 4's "100 Worst Britons We Love to Hate" programme. Writing in The Irish Times, Ed Power called Harry an "anointed cherub" who is "told he is special" before he achieves anything.

== In popular culture ==
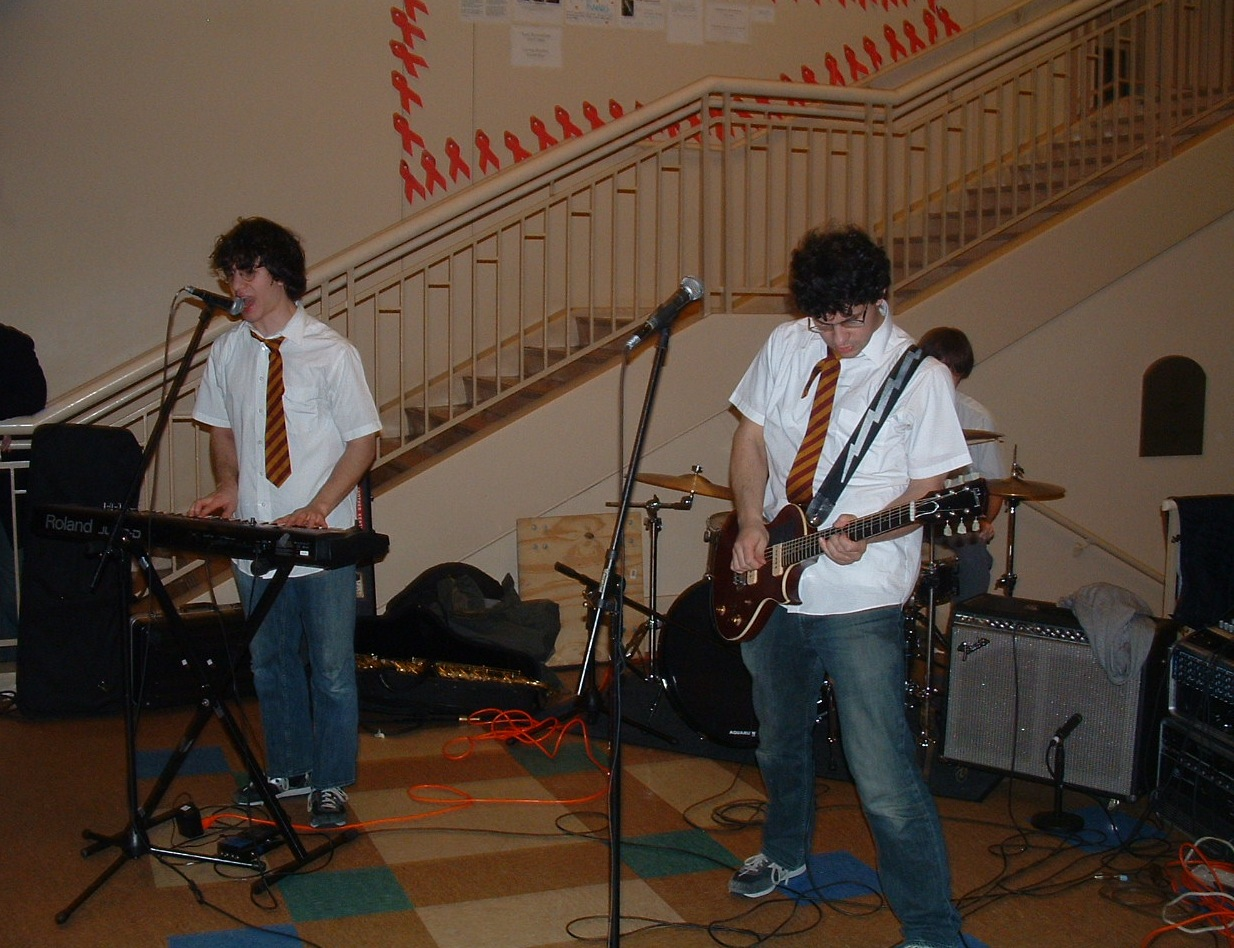
Harry and the Potters perform at the Horace Mann School in New York in 2007

The Harry Potter series has inspired "wizard rock" bands whose members dress up like Harry during performances. According to MTV, the genre was popularized by the Massachusetts duo Harry and the Potters in 2002, and became an international phenomenon, although it waned in popularity after the release of the final Harry Potter novel. (Note: Attributed to multiple references:)

Harry Potter is parodied in the Barry Trotter book series by American writer Michael Gerber. The series features the antihero Barry Trotter, who has been described by Gerber as an unpleasant character who "drinks too much, eats like a pig, sleeps until noon, and owes everybody money".
