= Soul Axiom =

2016 video game

- Developer: Wales Interactive
- Publisher: Wales Interactive
- Engine: Unity
- Platforms: Microsoft Windows; OS X; Linux; PlayStation 4; Wii U; Xbox One; Nintendo Switch
- Release: Windows, OS X, Linux; February 29, 2016; PlayStation 4, Xbox One; June 7, 2016; Wii U September 29, 2016; Nintendo Switch; February 27, 2020
- Genres: Adventure, puzzle
- Mode: Single-player

Soul Axiom is a first-person adventure-puzzle video game developed and published by Wales Interactive. The game is set inside a "Digital Soul Provider" called Elysia, and combines exploration with puzzle solving elements to unlock the mystery of your character's digital afterlife. It follows a similar visual style from its predecessor, Master Reboot, and while it is not a direct sequel, it is set in the same world but with new characters, a new story and new set of game mechanics. The game was released on February 29, 2016. PlayStation 4 and Xbox One ports were released in June 2016. The Wii U version launched on September 29, 2016. The game was released on February 27, 2020, for Nintendo Switch as Soul Axiom Rebooted.

== Gameplay ==
In Soul Axiom, the player plays an unknown protagonist, utilizing a first person camera as they wander through strange landscapes of unknown memories. The player will experience traditional adventure/puzzle gameplay, by interacting with physical puzzles, making psychological decisions and exploring the environment to find the right information to unlock the story of your character. The player is slowly granted abilities in the form of a hand power system which enables them manipulate the objects and environments around them, which will allow them to navigate through the world of Elysia. These abilities also further complicate the puzzles that the player is given.

The narrative is told through collectible items which take the form of a small symbol monkey. They are known as a PEMO (Personal Message Object) and act as messages from the outside world, usually in the form of news articles, emails, letters etc. Sometimes they are easy to find and other times you will have to explore the environment to find them. To support the PEMO's, you will unlock memories after each level you complete to piece together the story, these memories come in the form of a 3D animated cutscene. A gameplay trailer was released on January 20, 2015.

== Development ==
Soul Axiom was initially released on Steam Early Access on November 23, 2014, which included Chapter 1 and parts of Chapter 2. Since then, the developers have been releasing frequent updates which often contain new content in the form of more levels to play as well as bug fixes and general improvements that the community have suggested. The Early Access development was delayed due to a major engine upgrade from Unity 4 to Unity 5. It wasn't until February 29, 2016, when Soul Axiom left Early Access.

Releasing first for PC, Mac and Linux, Soul Axiom was announced to be launched on PlayStation 4, Xbox One and Wii U in 2016. Throughout the development, the game has been supported by the likes of Microsoft and Nintendo. Microsoft has taken the title to be exhibited on several of their gaming stands at events such as GDC San Francisco (2015) and EGX Rezzed (2015 & 2016). Microsoft also financially supported the game towards the end of development, accepting the game onto their Greenshoots programme. Similarly, Nintendo also exhibited the game on their stand at EGX (2015) and Gamescom Cologne (2015). Arguably, Wales Interactive's most successful promotion came from Nintendo's E3 Nindies@Home program, where an early demo of the game was free to download on Wii U with a launch day discount offer for anyone who downloaded the demo.

== Reception ==
After the game left early access, it has received mixed reviews collated on Metacritic for PC, receiving a total score of 56/100.

Soul Axiom was a finalist for "Use of Narrative" at the Develop Awards in 2015, and was nominated for a BAFTA Cymru Games Award for "Best Game".

Ben Barrett from Rock, Paper, Shotgun wrote: "It really is beautiful, nailing a Tron-like neon cyberspace feel...In the thirty minutes I gave the game this was never exploited to its full potential, but the odd bit of interaction was enough to keep me exploring the environments"

Ken Talbot from Push Square said: "The puzzle mechanics themselves are the game's key failing. Given abilities that control the environment around him, our silent protagonist is never allowed to use them in inventive or even organic ways." He gave the game a score of 50/100.

Reviewing the Early Access version, Mike Cosimano from Destructoid said: "Soul Axiom is an unsettling and compelling techno/cyber-thriller, with a killer visual style that matches its high-concept premise. Whether it actually delivers on its many promises is another thing entirely, but there's a lot to be excited about so far." However, Joe Parlock reviewed the final version for Destructoid and gave the game its worst Metacritic score to date, 25/100.

Staff from Attack Of The Fanboy wrote: "I would probably put it up there as one of, if not, the most pretty looking indie games I've ever played...While it wasn't advertised as a horror game, it sure can do plenty to scare you with just the general ambience."

PC Gamer wrote about the game several times during development and eventually gave a score of 55/100 in their review by James Davenport. Davenport wrote "Soul Axiom wants to be a huge, cerebral puzzle game. I admire the scope and variety of its modular environments, each with completely different aesthetics and puzzle mechanics ... Soul Axiom nearly gets by on intrigue. For the first two hours, however inconsistent, I was curious to explore the varied environments and play around with the shallow puzzles."

Jordan Helm from Hardcore Gamer compared the game to Tron, Bioshock and The Talos Principle and wrote: "Simplistic and often jarring its intended design may seem, Soul Axiom is a game that requires, as much cunningly desires, the player's warranted need to look beyond the surface that's initially presented. Whether that be in its puzzle design or the ample conflict of environments, Wales Interactive do just enough with the overarching themes of simulation and replication to make its superficial locales feel that extra bit suspicious." The review ended with a score of 3.5/5.

Pavel Valek from games.cz gave the game a 40/100: "If you expect a fun puzzle game, you have to look elsewhere. Soul Axiom offers plenty of easy levels and dull puzzles that will resolve themselves."

Peter Parrish from PC Invasion gave the game 7/10: "As a consequence of action sequences being a bit clunky, Soul Axiom's final encounter is a bit of a let down," and concluded with, "Soul Axiom consistently finds new and engaging ways for the player to use the same set of powers to overcome obstacles, and does an able job weaving its (justifiably) fragmented story throughout the game's hub structure."
