= CrimeWave =

1996 video game

- North American box art
- Developer: Eidos Interactive
- Publisher: Eidos Interactive
- Designer: Jim Blackler
- Artists: Joe Groombridge; David Banner
- Composers: Joe Myers; Mike Ash
- Platform: Sega Saturn
- Release: EU: November 8, 1996; NA: March 10, 1997
- Genre: Vehicular combat
- Mode: Single-player

CrimeWave is a 1996 vehicular combat video game developed and published by Eidos Interactive for the Sega Saturn.

== Gameplay ==
Gameplay screenshot.

The player's task is to patrol the city and chase down violent vehicle-bound criminals, destroying the offenders with various weaponry within a given time limit. Each criminal killed earns the player bounty money (called "Meks"), but money is subtracted for every civilian vehicle the player destroys in the process. Additional weapons and ammunition can be collected as powerups scattered throughout the map or salvaged from destroyed enemies. Other cops sometimes show up; they treat the player as competition and attack them as well as the criminals. After set amounts of Meks have been earned, additional regions of the city open up. If the player fails to kill enough criminals within the time limit, their vehicle self-destructs, resulting in a game over.

The game takes an isometric overhead view with the cars being pre-rendered sprites, but the buildings and scenery are rendered in 3D.

== Plot ==
CrimeWave takes place in the fictional futuristic city of Mekeo, plagued by rampant crime and chaos. To combat this crimewave, the corrupt mayor has privatized the city's police force and offers bounties to anyone that takes out a wanted criminal, effectively turning the police into bounty hunters. The player takes the role of a member of the Mekeo Vehicle Police patrolling the city with their heavily armed police car to take out criminals and collect bounty money while simultaneously fighting off rival cops that are out for the same bounties.

== Development ==
CrimeWave was Eidos Interactive's first Sega Saturn game. It was developed specifically with the Saturn in mind, primarily because Saturn development kits were less expensive than the ones for the Sony PlayStation at the time. Though Eidos originally announced the game as a multiplatform title, only the Saturn version was ultimately released. A promotional disc with a playable demonstration of the game was also released in Europe.

== Reception ==
Reception

Review scores
Publication	Score
AllGame	2.5/5
Edge	4/10
Electronic Gaming Monthly	6.125/10
EP Daily	6/10
Famitsu	18/40
Game Informer	7.5/10
GameSpot	5.3/10
IGN	7/10
Next Generation	3/5
Sega Saturn Magazine	73%

CrimeWave received mediocre reviews. While critics complimented the sharpness of the graphics and great amount of detail, they generally found that the sensitive controls, the high density of vehicles on the road, and the rotation of the camera when the player's car turns make the game disorienting and sometimes frustrating to play. Rob Allsetter wrote in Sega Saturn Magazine, "Although Crimewave has its moments, it's let down by gameplay that's too repetitive and controls that are often frustrating." GamePro's Coach Kyle similarly described it as "an average driving/shooting game that's neither varied enough nor thrilling enough to offer great gunplay." (Note: GamePro gave the game 3.5/5 for graphics, 3.5/5 for sound, 2/5 for control, and 3/5 for fun factor.) Shawn Smith and Crispin Boyer of Electronic Gaming Monthly were slightly more positive, with Boyer opining, "Crime Wave doesn't offer revolutionary graphics or especially innovative gameplay. It's just a fun title that delivers plenty of arcade action." Co-reviewers Dan Hsu and Sushi-X fell more in line with the majority; Hsu said the game made him throw his controller down in frustration. Ryan MacDonald of GameSpot concluded that CrimeWave "isn't bad", but that the gameplay is limited and average enough that it becomes dull after a relatively short time.

Next Generation had a different take, arguing that the level design and controls are brilliant, but that the mid-level loading "leaves the player frustrated and transforms it into a merely noteworthy game instead of a classic."
