= The Turn of the Screw (1999 film) =

1999 television movie directed by Ben Bolt

- DVD cover
- Based on: The Turn of the Screw by Henry James
- Written by: Nick Dear
- Directed by: Ben Bolt
- Starring: Colin Firth; Jodhi May; Pam Ferris
- Composer: Adrian Johnston

Production
- Producer: Martin Pope
- Running time: 101 minutes
- Production companies: United Film and Television; Meridian Broadcasting; Martin Pope Productions

Original release
- Network: ITV
- Release: 26 December 1999
- Network: WGBH Boston
- Release: 27 February 2000

The Turn of the Screw is a 1999 television film based on the 1898 novel The Turn of the Screw by Henry James. The production starred Colin Firth as the Master, Jodhi May as the governess 'Miss' and Pam Ferris as Mrs Grose. The 138 minute film was made for the American series Masterpiece Theatre, a drama anthology television series produced by WGBH Boston, and was directed by Ben Bolt. The score was composed by Adrian Johnston while the screenplay was written by Nick Dear.

== Synopsis ==
An impressionable young governess (Jodhi May), the youngest daughter of a poor Hampshire parson, is employed by the Master (Colin Firth) to take charge of his orphaned nephew and niece. But he makes one stipulation - he must never be contacted about the children at all. The young woman, known as 'Miss' to her charges, finds a friend and ally in the housekeeper, Mrs Grose (Pam Ferris), but soon comes to believe that the orphans are communicating with the ghosts of the previous governess and her lover.

== Cast ==
- The Master - Colin Firth
- Miss (the governess) - Jodhi May
- Mrs Grose - Pam Ferris
- Miss Jessel - Caroline Pegg
- Peter Quint - Jason Salkey
- Miles - Joe Sowerbutts
- Flora - Grace Robinson
- Cook - Jenny Howe

== Production ==
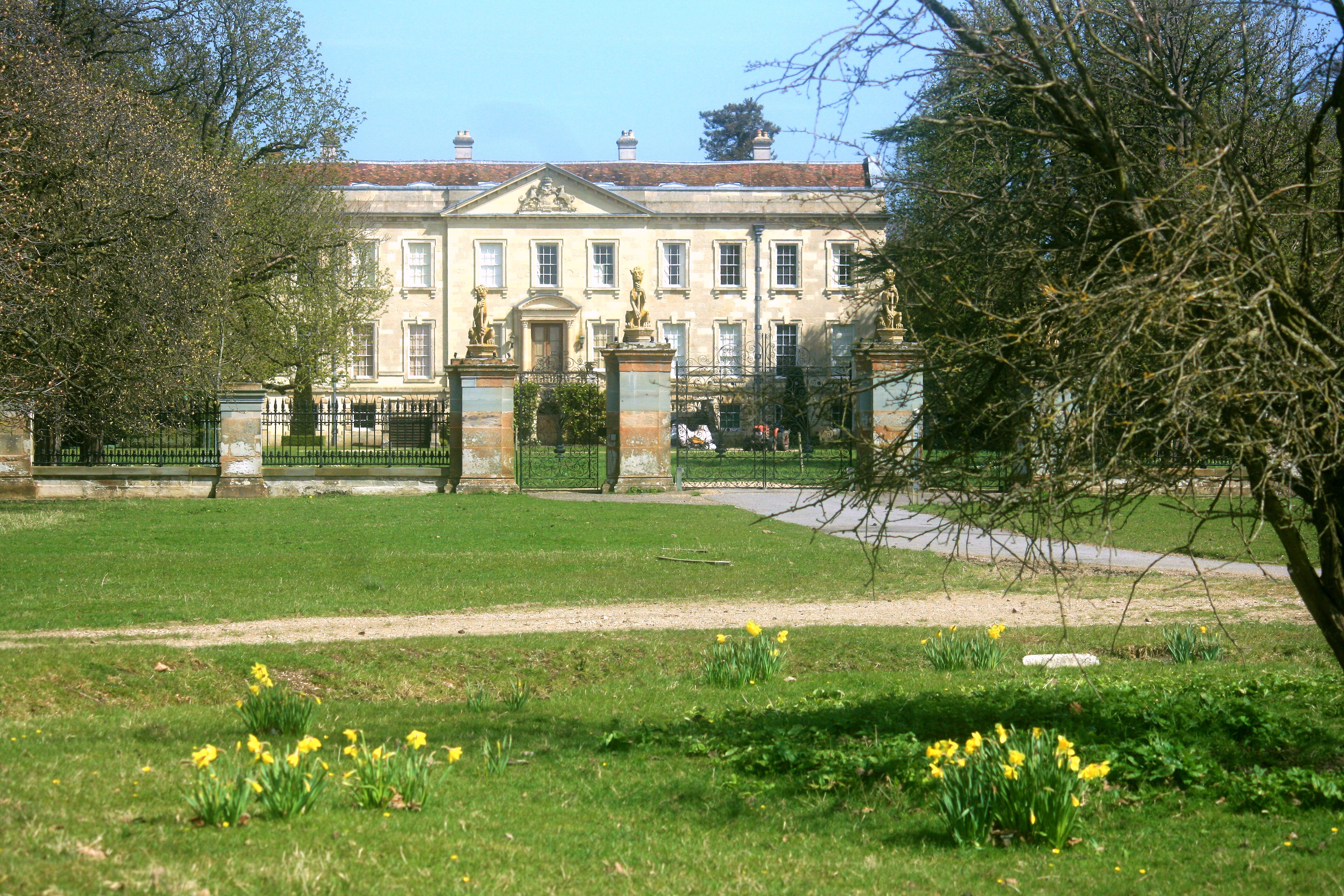
Filming took place at Thame Park in Oxfordshire

The film was made in London and at the country house Thame Park at Thame in Oxfordshire.

A review in Variety said:

Filmed countless times for both the bigscreen and the tube, Henry James' timeless ghost story still carries a provocative charge. This straightforward, solid adaptation for Masterpiece Theatre brings nothing especially new to the rich material, but fine performances and a seamless production deliver the requisite chills. There may be no burning reason for yet another screen version of the masterful short novel, other than the profound pull of the story, but perhaps that’s reason enough.

Walter Goodman, the critic of The New York Times, wrote:

Despite the periodic scenes of the unstable governess running around the stately mansion bearing a candle that does little to lighten the gloomy staircase and corridors, the apparitions or ghosts are not particularly spooky...

Actress Jodhi May, who played the unnamed governess in the drama, said that she believed that Nick Dear's adaptation focused on the darkness of the novel:

He has captured in his version her constantly having a sense of doubt whether the children are innocent or incredibly sophisticated. The sense of her not being able to define reality or reason with the situation in any kind of rational way is really what makes the piece so disturbing.

Director Ben Bolt said he believed that the children weren't possessed by the ghosts, but were, instead, psychologically disturbed by the loss of their parents:

...their parents died in India when they were very young and they had been stuck in this big old country house. This made them very close to each other, which a certain suspicious kind of adult [like Miss] would find worrying, that they would whisper and be private with each other... But they [the ghosts] only appear because of her mixed-up psychological state ... These ghosts were lying in their pit or wherever ghosts hang out and were awakened by her hysteria.
