= Knee Deep (video game) =

2017 adventure video game

- Developer: Prologue Games
- Publisher: Wales Interactive
- Engine: Unity
- Platforms: Microsoft Windows, PlayStation 4, Xbox One, MacOS, Linux
- Release: January 31, 2017
- Genre: Adventure
- Mode: Single-player

Knee Deep is a 2017 adventure video game, with a graphic design as if it was being performed on stage at the theatre. It has three acts, the first of which was released in 2015.

== Production ==
Dialogue choices impact the game's story

After working on various genres of video games, Colin Dwan and Wes Platt decided to work on a purely narrative-driven game. After a few months of pre-production, the duo raised funding and quit their jobs to pursue the project.

The game was first showcased at Rezzed in March 2015.

== Plot ==
The player investigates the suicide of a washed-up actor in the backwater Florida town of Cypress Knee.

The game consists of three acts: Act 1: Wonderland, Act 2: Festival, and Act 3: Boomtown.

== Gameplay ==
The game plays largely like an interactive movie. Players choose dialogue options at certain points that affect the narrative.

== Reception ==
Reception

Aggregate score
Aggregator	Score
Metacritic	PS4: 54/100; PC: 66/100

Review score
Publication	Score
Destructoid	7/10

Alissa McAloon of Destructoid thought the game was let down by the final two acts. John-Paul Jones of PSU praised the title for its innovativeness. The Digital Fix's Edd Harwood compared the gameplay to that of Telltale games, and noted the game's odd sense of humour. Alice O'Connor of Rock, Paper, Shotgun deemed the style ugly yet bold, and a good compromise for the company's small development team.
