= The Complex (video game) =

2020 video game

- Developer: Wales Interactive
- Platform: iOS; macOS; Microsoft Windows
- Release: 2020
- Genres: Science fiction, full-motion video

The Complex is a 2020 interactive science fiction full-motion video game.

== Overview ==
In this choose-your-own-adventure style video game the player portrays Dr. Amy Tennant (played by Michelle Mylett), trapped in a bunker after a bio-weapon attack on London in a race against time to escape alive.

== Reception ==
Engadget said in their review "Fundamentally, it's a mostly entertaining way to spend $13, and an evening, but I doubt that you'll feel too compelled to find all nine endings unless you're a real obsessive."

Screen Rant said "Overall, The Complex is another FMV game that does not live up to the potential this genre of interactive movie/gaming hybrid could potentially offer."
