= The Bunker (video game) =

2016 video game

- Developer: Splendy Games
- Publisher: Wales Interactive
- Director: Allan Plenderleith
- Producers: Cloudtopia Entertainment, Henrik Gwinner
- Writers: Kevin Beimers; Steve Ince; Allan Plenderleith
- Composer: Dom Shovelton
- Engine: Unity
- Platforms: Windows; Nintendo Switch; OS X; PlayStation 4; Xbox One
- Release: Windows, OS X, PS4; 20 September 2016; Xbox One; 23 September 2016; Nintendo Switch; 9 April 2018
- Genres: Adventure, horror
- Mode: Single-player

The Bunker is a full motion video (FMV) adventure horror video game developed by British game developer Splendy Games and published by Wales Interactive. It was released for Windows, OS X, and PlayStation 4 on 20 September 2016 followed by Xbox One on 23 September 2016 and Nintendo Switch on 9 April 2018.

The Bunker is Splendy Games' first major title as an independent games studio after having released the FMV zombie horror video game The Hunting for iOS and Android. The development team includes the writers and designer of The Witcher, Broken Sword, and SOMA.

== Gameplay ==
The game's player follows the daily routine of the main protagonist, John (played by Adam Brown), who grew up in a fallout shelter in Britain following a nuclear war. When an alarm is triggered, the player has to guide John around the bunker to venture into forgotten areas, recovering his repressed memories and unlocking the secrets of the bunker. The player is presented with live action footage throughout the entire game, with a point and click style of adventure gameplay. Utilising a third and first person camera, the player is presented with both flashback sequences and present day footage of an underground nuclear bunker.

== Plot ==
On July 3, 1986, England falls under nuclear attack, forcing the government and its populace to evacuate into underground fallout bunkers. In one such military bunker, one of the staff, Margaret, is pregnant and ends up giving birth to her son John right when the bombs fall.

Thirty years later, a now adult John is apparently the sole survivor of the bunker after Margaret passes away from old age. He listens to his mother's advice and follows the rigid daily routine she taught to him, checking on the bunker's systems and taking proper food and medication while never leaving the isolated section of the bunker he is living in. However, several days after Margaret's death, the bunker's server fails, forcing John to leave level 1 of the bunker and journey down to level 2 to reset the server. Upon resetting the server, John is horrified to learn that the air filtration system is failing and heads down to level 3 to replace the filters. However, as he attempts to reactivate the system, he falls off a ladder and breaks his arm while inadvertently activating the contaminated backup air filter system. John returns to level 1 to perform first aid on his arm, and quickly learns that the contaminated backup air filtration system is slowly spreading radiation throughout the entire bunker. He is forced to take the emergency exit to level 4 and then to level 5, where starts to recall repressed memories from his childhood.

Twenty years prior, conditions inside the bunker were grim due to radiation levels outside being far higher than expected, meaning it would not be safe to leave for another twenty to thirty years instead of the originally planned ten years. Margaret learned that the bunker's commander, Hurley, was keeping secret the fact that the bunker only had less than a year's worth of supplies to feed the whole staff and contact with all the other bunkers had been lost, meaning no help would be arriving. Intent on protecting her son, Margaret tricked John into planting poison in the bunker's ventilation system while they themselves took shelter in a sealed room, killing all of the staff except Hurley. An enraged Hurley attacked Margaret, forcing John to shoot him with his own gun. With Margaret and John as the sole survivors, the remaining supplies could last them for another sixty years.

Horrified upon realizing the role he played in the death of the rest of the staff, John is haunted by visions of their ghosts as he makes his way to the emergency exit. Upon reaching the exit, he is confronted by Margaret's ghost, who begs him not to abandon her and to stay with her in the bunker instead. John can choose to stay in the bunker and inevitably die of radiation poisoning, or leave the bunker and take his first breath of the outside air, uncertain if it is safe to do so.

== Development ==
After releasing The Hunting, Splendy Games set out to create a more ambitious live action game with an increased budget and significantly higher production values. The Bunker was filmed entirely at the Kelvedon Hatch Secret Nuclear Bunker in Essex, England over 15 days, with the entire game development spreading over a year. For the main characters, Splendy Games hired a cast of actors including Adam Brown who had played Ori in The Hobbit film series, and Sarah Greene who played Hecate Poole in the Penny Dreadful TV series and who also voiced Anne Bonny in Assassin's Creed IV: Black Flag. The game also stars Grahame Fox who had portrayed Ralf Kenning in the Game of Thrones and Jerome St. John Blake who played various characters in Star Wars.

== Reception ==
=== Critical reception ===
The Bunker received mixed reviews following the launch. Review aggregator Metacritic shows an average score of 68 out of 100 for the PlayStation 4 version, and 66 out of 100 for the Xbox One version. Praise was particularly directed at the game's narrative, and the actors' performance. However, the game's lack of interactivity was often criticised.

GamesRadar's David Roberts lauded the game's sound design and music, remarking that "the John Carpenter-ian strains of its synths and the quality foley work help sell some of its more distressing moments... Playing in the dark with my headphones in, this scene got under my skin in a way few games have"

Anthony John Agnello visited the game for GamesRadar and called it "PS4's freakiest post-apocalyptic game".

After naming the game as "the strangest game played at Gamescom 2016", IGN's Joe Skrebels said "it's really weird and interesting and exactly the kind of thing you come to these kind of conventions to see."

Stephen Turner of Destructoid praised the atmospheric mood of the game, "The Bunker perfectly captures John’s sense of claustrophobia and paranoia with intense close-ups, security footage, and just a really good use of lighting." However, Xbox Achievement's Richard Walker disagreed with this concluding "A linear interactive drama that fails to engender any sense of genuine drama or tension."

A mixed review by Eurogamer's Christian Donlan spoke highly of the production, stating "it affords this production the means of incorporating a real Cold War bunker which, as Martin mentioned in his preview, is the true star of the show: a place both echoey and claustrophobic, and grimly evocative of old-school Britain in its range of institutional greens and greys". However, he went on to criticise the game's limited gameplay aspects, saying "The Bunker is a fairly simple-minded game – at most you will be tasked with finding the odd key in order to proceed through the linear plot – and while it's often a memorable one, that's more down to its setting and throw-back tech than its design or its narrative."

=== Accolades ===
The Bunker has received three award nominations at the TIGA Games Industry Awards 2016 for Most Original Game, Audio Design and Game of the Year
