= Paris-Dakar Rally (video game) =

2001 video game

- Developer: Broadsword Interactive
- Publisher: Acclaim Entertainment
- Platforms: Microsoft Windows, PlayStation 2
- Release: EU: 7 September 2001; NA: 4 October 2001 (PS2)
- Genre: Racing
- Modes: Single-player, multiplayer

Paris-Dakar Rally is a racing video game developed by Broadsword Interactive and published by Acclaim Entertainment for Microsoft Windows and PlayStation 2. It is based on the real-life Paris Dakar Rally – one of the world's most difficult and dangerous sporting events. Based on the 2000 running of the rally, the game features ten locations (each containing four stages) beginning in Senegal and ending in Wadi Elrayan, Egypt.

== Reception ==
Reception

Aggregate score
Aggregator	Score	
Aggregator	PC	PS2
Metacritic	N/A	36/100

Review scores
Publication	Score	
Publication	PC	PS2
4Players	N/A	59%
Consoles +	N/A	70%
EP Daily	N/A	3.5/10
GameSpot	N/A	2.9/10
GameStar	51%	N/A
IGN	N/A	2.5/10
Jeuxvideo.com	8/20	9/20
Official U.S. PlayStation Magazine	N/A	2/5
PC Games (DE)	30%	N/A
PC Zone	55%	N/A

The PlayStation 2 version received "unfavourable" reviews according to the review aggregation website Metacritic.

It was nominated for GameSpot's 2001 "Worst Game" award among console games, which went to Kabuki Warriors.
