= Late Shift (video game) =

2017 video game

- Developer: CtrlMovie
- Publisher: Wales Interactive
- Director: Tobias Weber
- Producers: Baptiste Planche; Kurban Kassam
- Writers: Tobias Weber; Michael R. Johnson
- Composer: Cyril Boehler
- Engine: Unity
- Platforms: macOS; Windows; PlayStation 4; Xbox One; Nintendo Switch
- Release: Windows, macOS, PS4, Xbox One; WW: 18 April 2017; Switch; WW: 26 April 2018
- Genres: Adventure, interactive movie
- Mode: Single-player

Late Shift is an interactive FMV video game written and directed by Tobias Weber. The participation film technology behind the title was developed by CtrlMovie. The title was screened at many international film festivals, including the New York Film Festival, Raindance Film Festival, and the Festival du nouveau cinéma.

== Gameplay ==
Late Shift is presented much like a regular movie. During the film, the player is able to make choices on behalf of the protagonist. The presentation doesn't pause during the decision-making process, so viewers must react in real-time. There are 180 choice points in the feature-film, and the user interaction influences characters and the events of the game and lead the story to one of seven different endings.

== Plot ==
The main protagonist is Matt Thompson, a college student who works as a parking lot attendant in London. One night, an armed robbery crew steals a BMW i8 from the garage to later use as a getaway car, and Matt is kidnapped by them in the process. Because one of the robbers broke his arm and they can't find a replacement in time, they coerce Matt into participating in the robbery with them. Their target is a centuries-old Chinese porcelain rice bowl that historically belonged to the Tchoi family, but is now being auctioned off by British steel magnate Samuel Parr at the auction house Hainsworth's. The Tchoi family attend the auction and win the bid for the bowl, but the crew assaults Hainsworth's employee Sebastian Leclerc in the basement for the bowl and escape. However, their van is run off a bridge by another car, overturns and catches fire. Matt and a young woman from the crew, May-Ling, are the only survivors and leave with the bowl intact - based on the player's decisions, Matt has the opportunity to cooperate, befriend and even become romantic with May-Ling.

Depending on the player's choices, it can be revealed that Parr previously paid May-Ling to forge a copy of the bowl, and also paid Leclerc to swap the bowls and hide the real one in a separate auction item that Parr bought. May-Ling also surmises that Parr orchestrated their car accident, because the van catching fire would have made the fake bowl identical to the real one under thermoluminescence. The player's choices influence the events of the game and can lead to 7 different endings.

== Cast ==
- Joe Sowerbutts as Matt Thompson
- Haruka Abe as May-Ling
- Richard Durden as Samuel Parr
- Lily Travers as Élodie
- Joel Basman as Sébastien
- Sol Heras as Jeff
- Tom Phillips as Simon
- Johnny Sachon as Lee
- Daryl Kwan as Father Tchoi
- Junix Inocian as Mr. Woe
- Tai Yin Chan as Tchoi Jr.

== Reception ==
Reception

Aggregate score
Aggregator	Score			
Aggregator	NS	PC	PS4	Xbox One
Metacritic	73/100	79/100	59/100	72/100

Review scores
Publication	Score			
Publication	NS	PC	PS4	Xbox One
Destructoid	N/A	N/A	5/10	N/A
Game Informer	N/A	N/A	6.5/10	N/A
Nintendo Life	8/10	N/A	N/A	N/A
Nintendo World Report	8/10	N/A	N/A	N/A

Late Shift received "mixed or average reviews" on all platforms, according to review aggregator Metacritic, except for the PC version, which received "generally favorable reviews". The Sunday Times named it "the most important film of the year", The Guardian called it "a digital experience to look out for". The film won many awards, including a BAFTA Cymru Award (Best Game), "Best Mobile/Tablet" and "Most Creative and Original" at Game Connection Development Awards and "Best Narrative" at BIG Festival Brazil. Further it was nominated for an IMG Award, for "Visual Design" and "Action and Adventure Game" at The Independent Game Developers' Association Awards 2017, and for "Writing or Narrative Design" and "Gameplay Innovation" at the 2018 Develop Awards.

Apart from the majority of positive reactions there were also a few critical voices. Vice deemed it an "intriguing failure". Eurogamer noted the game's continuity errors.
