= Wales Interactive =

Welsh video game publisher

Wales Interactive Limited
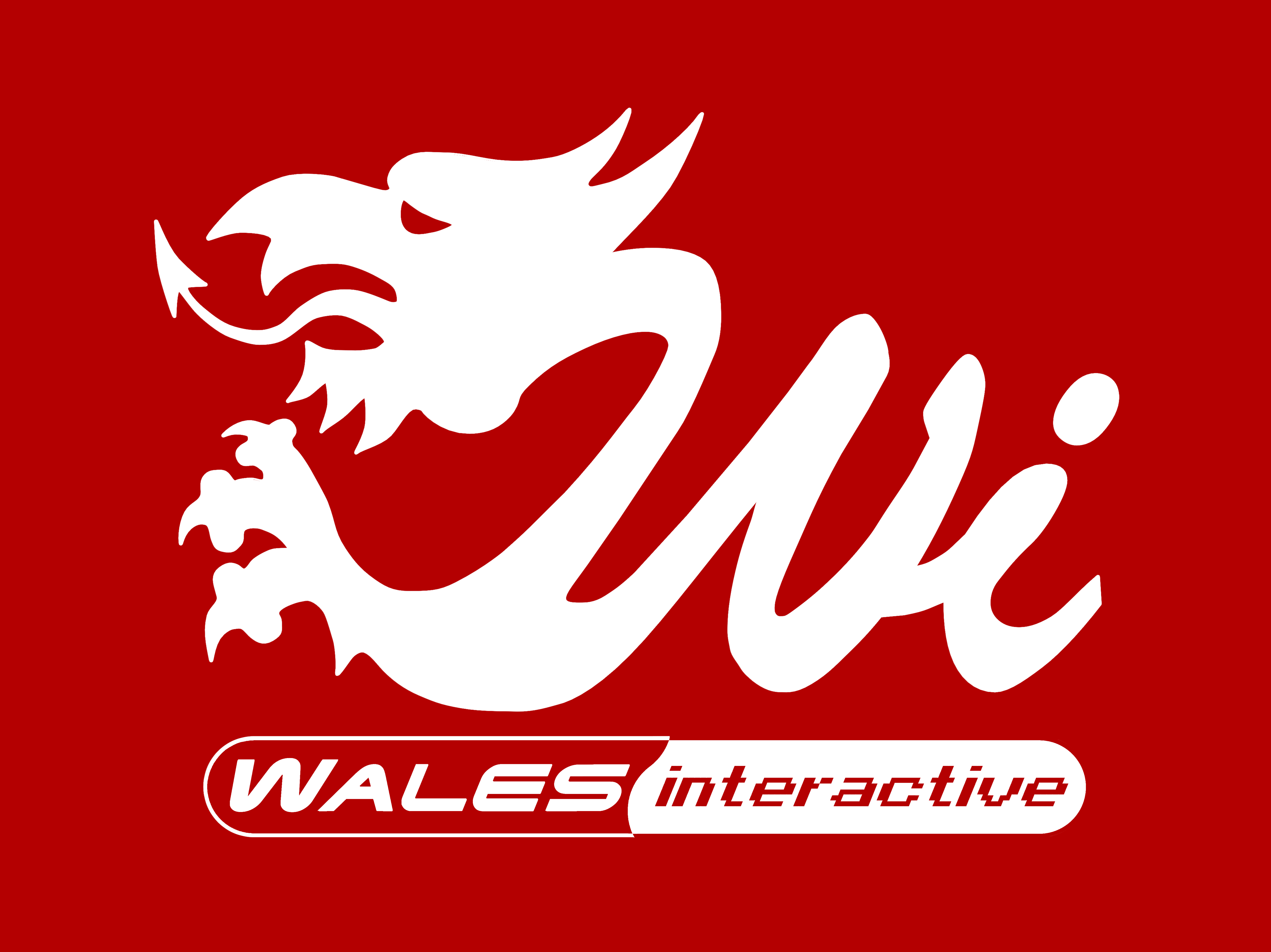
- Type: Private
- Industry: Video games
- Founded: 24 October 2011; 14 years ago
- Headquarters: Penarth, Wales
- Key people: David Banner MBE; Richard Pring
- Number of employees: 10
- Website: walesinteractive.com

Wales Interactive Limited is a Welsh independent video game developer and publisher established in 2011 and based in Penarth, Wales. The studio, best known for Sker Ritual, Maid of Sker, The Bunker, Five Dates and The Complex, have published over 30 video game titles for PC, mobile and video game consoles. They received the BAFTA Cymru Games Award 2012 and 2018, Appster's Award for Best Indie Game Developer 2014, GREAT Face of British Business Winner 2015, South Wales Business of the Year 2014 and 2016, and Wales Technology Award Winner 2017 and 2018. The studio supports a variety of gaming platforms including PlayStation 5, Xbox Series X and Series S, Nintendo Switch, and Microsoft Windows as well as virtual reality devices including HTC Vive, Oculus Quest 2 and PlayStation VR. Wales Interactive develop and publish their own original intellectual property as well as third-party titles. Wales Interactive was part of the mid-2010s revival of the genre of FMV games.

== History ==
The company was formed in 2012 by co-founders Dr David Banner MBE and Richard Pring. Both founders previously co-managed GamesLab Wales together under University of Glamorgan (now University of South Wales). Banner, a former employee of Pivotal Games and Eidos Interactive, also founded the Wales Games Development Show. Wales Interactive was formed with an aim to create original games that entertain the world as well as put Wales on the video games map. In 2018, David Banner a received a Member of the Order of the British Empire (MBE) recognition in the Queen's Birthday Honours List for services to the video games industry.

Most of Wales Interactive's early work consisted of mobile apps and games as well as a series of Welsh e-books which were supported by S4C's digital fund. In 2013, they shifted development to focus on PC and consoles with their title, Gravity Badgers, and the psychological horror Master Reboot. The development team released Infinity Runner with Oculus Rift support, a first for the company. Infinity Runner went on to being the first PlayStation 4 and Xbox One game to be made entirely in Wales. The studio gained a major publication feature in a studio profile for Edge, which coincided with the early access development stages of their science fiction adventure game Soul Axiom.

In 2015, Wales Interactive established its third-party publishing label. They partnered with UK independent developers Milky Tea to bring their title Coffin Dodgers to Xbox One and PlayStation 4. The studio continues to develop their label by co-developing and publishing the FMV survival horror video game The Bunker.

== Games ==
=== Published games ===
Title	Year	Developers	Platform(s)
Sker: The Bleeding Viel	2027	Stormind Games, Wales Interactive	PC, PlayStation 5, Xbox Series X/S
Beaten Path	2027	Peacebreak Studios, Wales Interactive	PC, Nintendo Switch, PlayStation 5, Xbox Series X/S
Hazard Levels	2026	Wales Interactive	PC, PlayStation 5, Xbox Series X/S
The Crimson Maid	2026	GrimTalin, Darkania Works, Wales Interactive	PC, PlayStation 5, Xbox Series X/S
Heart of the Forest	2026	Wales Interactive, Trapped Predator	PC, Nintendo Switch, PlayStation 5, Xbox Series X/S, iOS, Android
Dead Reset	2025	Wales Interactive, Dark Rift Horror	PC, Nintendo Switch, PlayStation 5, Xbox Series X/S, iOS, Android
Sker Ritual	2024	Wales Interactive	PC, PlayStation 5, Xbox Series X/S
The Isle Tide Hotel	2023	Wales Interactive, Interflix Media	PC, Nintendo Switch, PlayStation 5 PlayStation 4, Xbox One, Mac OS, iOS
Mia and the Dragon Princess	2023	Wales Interactive, Good Gate Media, Dead Pixel Productions	PC, Nintendo Switch, PlayStation 5 PlayStation 4, Xbox One, Mac OS, iOS
Ten Dates	2023	Wales Interactive, Good Gate Media	PC, Nintendo Switch, PlayStation 5 PlayStation 4, Xbox One, Mac OS, iOS
Deathtrap Dungeon: The Golden Room	2022	Wales Interactive, Good Gate Media	PC, Nintendo Switch, PlayStation 5 PlayStation 4, Xbox One, Mac OS, iOS
Who Pressed Mute on Uncle Marcus?	2022	Wales Interactive, Good Gate Media	PC, Nintendo Switch, PlayStation 5, PlayStation 4, Xbox One, Mac OS, iOS
Bloodshore	2021	Wales Interactive, Good Gate Media	PC, Nintendo Switch, PlayStation 5, PlayStation 4, Xbox One, Mac OS, iOS
Night Book	2021	Wales Interactive, Good Gate Media	PC, Nintendo Switch, PlayStation 5, PlayStation 4, Xbox One, Mac OS, iOS
I Saw Black Clouds	2021	Wales Interactive, Ghost Dog Films	PC, Nintendo Switch, PlayStation 5, PlayStation 4, Xbox One, Mac OS, iOS
Five Dates	2020	Wales Interactive, Good Gate Media	PC, Nintendo Switch, PlayStation 5, PlayStation 4, Xbox One, Mac OS, iOS, Android
The Complex	2020	Wales Interactive, Good Gate Media	PC, Nintendo Switch, PlayStation 5, PlayStation 4, Xbox One, Mac OS, iOS, Android
Maid of Sker	2020	Wales Interactive	PC, Nintendo Switch, PlayStation 4, PlayStation 5, Xbox One, Xbox Series X/S, Mac OS
Headspun	2019	Superstring	PC, Nintendo Switch, PlayStation 4, Xbox One
Attack of the Earthlings	2019	Team Junkfish	PlayStation 4, Xbox One
Time Carnage	2018	Wales Interactive	PC, Nintendo Switch, PlayStation 4, Xbox One
The Shapeshifting Detective	2018	Wales Interactive, D'Avekki Studios	PC, Nintendo Switch, PlayStation 4, Xbox One, Mac OS, iOS
The Infectious Madness of Doctor Dekker	2018	D'Avekki Studios	PC, Nintendo Switch, PlayStation 4, Xbox One
Typoman	2018	Brainseed Factory	Nintendo Switch
SIMULACRA	2017	Kaigan Games	PC, Nintendo Switch, PlayStation 4, Xbox One, Mac OS, iOS, Android
Don't Knock Twice	2017	Wales Interactive	PC, Mac OS, Nintendo Switch, PlayStation 4, Xbox One
Late Shift	2017	CtrlMovie	Android, iOS, PC, Mac OS, Nintendo Switch, PlayStation 4, Xbox One
Knee Deep	2017	Prologue Games	PlayStation 4, Xbox One
The Bunker	2016	Splendy Games, Wales Interactive	PC, Mac OS, Nintendo Switch, PlayStation 4, Xbox One, iOS, Android
Coffin Dodgers	2016	Milky Tea	Nintendo Switch, PlayStation 4, Xbox One
Soul Axiom	2016	Wales Interactive	PC, Mac OS, Linux, PlayStation 4, Xbox One, Wii U
Infinity Runner	2014	Wales Interactive	PC, Mac OS, Linux, PlayStation 4, Xbox One, Wii U
Master Reboot	2013	Wales Interactive	PC, Mac OS, Linux, PlayStation 3, Wii U
Gravity Badgers	2012	Wales Interactive	Android, iOS, Windows Mobile, PlayStation Vita, PC, Mac OS, Linux, PlayStation 3, Wii U
Stride Files: The Square Murder	2012	Wales Interactive	Android, iOS, Windows Mobile, PC, Mac OS, Linux
Jack Vs Ninjas	2012	Wales Interactive	Android, iOS, Windows Mobile,

=== Entertainment and interactive books ===
Title	Year	Developers	Platform(s)
Mr Frog the Neighbours Dog	2012	Wales Interactive	Android, iOS, Amazon Appstore
Mrs Sprat Next Doors Cat	2012	Wales Interactive	Android, iOS, Amazon Appstore
Miss Giraffe the Farmers Calf	2012	Wales Interactive	Android, iOS, Amazon Appstore
Mrs Doe the Local Crow	2012	Wales Interactive	Android, iOS, Amazon Appstore
Mr Tiger the House Spider	2012	Wales Interactive	Android, iOS, Amazon Appstore
Jibs Jump Fruit Frenzy	2012	Wales Interactive	Android, iOS, Amazon Appstore
Kitten Calculator	2012	Wales Interactive	Android, iOS, Amazon Appstore
World Torch Challenge	2012	Wales Interactive	Android, iOS, Amazon Appstore
Jibs Arcade	2012	Wales Interactive	Microsoft Windows
Super Combombo	2013	Wales Interactive	Android, iOS, Amazon Appstore
DJ Space	2013	Wales Interactive	Android, iOS, Amazon Appstore, Microsoft Windows
