= Don't Knock Twice (video game) =

2017 survival horror video game

- Developer: Wales Interactive
- Publisher: Wales Interactive
- Engine: Unity
- Platforms: Microsoft Windows, PlayStation 4, Xbox One, Nintendo Switch
- Release: Microsoft Windows, PlayStation 4, Xbox One: WW: September 5, 2017; Nintendo Switch: WW: October 17, 2017
- Genre: Survival horror
- Mode: Single-player

Don't Knock Twice is a first-person survival horror video game developed and published by Wales Interactive. The game is compatible with the PlayStation VR, HTC Vive and Oculus Rift virtual reality platforms. It was released worldwide in September 2017. A version for the Nintendo Switch was released in October 2017. Don't Knock Twice shares the same name as the film and is loosely based on the same story. The player takes the role of a guilt-ridden mother who must save her estranged daughter by uncovering the truth behind the urban tale of a vengeful, demonic witch.

== Gameplay ==
The player is free to explore a grand manor house in search of their character's lost daughter. In VR, they can teleport to move around and interact with almost every item. The player has a mobile phone, which guides them through the house and leaves hints to what challenges or puzzles lay ahead. While searching for their daughter, the player is haunted by a demonic witch, Baba Yaga, who is able to appear from anywhere at any time. There are some combat elements such as wielding an axe to chop down doors and creating flamethrowers by combining two items.

== Plot ==
Loosely based on the film, the game follows guilt-ridden artist/sculptor mother Jessica Webb-Thomas, as she uncovers the terrifying truth behind the frightening urban legend of the vengeful, demonic witch Baba Yaga from Slavic folklore in order to save her estranged daughter Chloe.

== Development ==
The game was announced by Wales Interactive on October 24, 2016, with a free playable demo, which was released on Steam for HTC Vive. A following update included support for Oculus Rift with Oculus Touch controls. On December 12, 2016, Wales Interactive campaigned for a place in the VRDB "2016 VR of the Year Awards" and went on to reaching the final round of nominations after achieving a mention in the Top 50 list.

== Reception ==
Reception

Aggregate score
Aggregator	Score
Metacritic	PC: 56/100; PS4: 56/100; XO: 53/100; NS: 39/100

Review scores
Publication	Score
GameSpot	5/10
Nintendo Life	4/10
UploadVR	5/10

Don't Knock Twice received mixed to negative reviews from critics. On Metacritic, the game holds scores of 56/100 for the PC version based on six reviews, 56/100 for the PlayStation 4 version based on seven reviews, and 39/100 for the Switch version based on five reviews.

The game was nominated for the "Creativity and Heritage Award" at The Independent Game Developers' Association Awards 2017, and for "Sound Design" at the 2018 Develop Awards.
