= List of prequels =

This is a list of prequels.

Works with darker gray background shading have been primarily described as a sequel, remake, or reboot, but have also been regarded as prequels in a broad sense of the word.

== Literature ==
Prequel	Original
The Argonautica (3rd Century BCE)	The Iliad (c. 8th Century BCE)
The History of the Holy Grail (c. 1230)	Death of Arthur (c. 1210)
The Last of the Mohicans (1826) The Pathfinder (1840); The Deerslayer (1841)	The Pioneers (1823)
Wide Sargasso Sea (1966)	Jane Eyre (1847)
Porto Bello Gold (1924)	Treasure Island (1883)
Finn: A Novel (2007)	Adventures of Huckleberry Finn (1884)
Sir Nigel (1906)	The White Company (1891)
Wicked: The Life and Times of the Wicked Witch of the West (1995)	The Wonderful Wizard of Oz (1900)
Just Patty (1911)	When Patty Went to College (1903)
Before Green Gables (2008)	Anne of Green Gables (1908)
Mr. Midshipman Hornblower (1950); Lieutenant Hornblower (1952); Hornblower and the Atropos (1953); Hornblower and the Hotspur (1962); Hornblower and the Crisis (1967)	The Happy Return (1937)
The Man Who Sold the Moon (1949)	Requiem (1940)
The Crown of Violet (1952)	The Hills of Varna (1948)
Prelude to Foundation (1988); Forward the Foundation (1993)	Foundation (1951)
The Deceivers (1952); Coromandel! (1955)	Nightrunners of Bengal (1951)
The Horse and His Boy (1954); The Magician's Nephew (1955)	Prince Caspian (1951)
Forever and a Day (2018)	Casino Royale (1953)
They Shall Have Stars (1956)	Earthman, Come Home (1955)
Prelude to Dune (1999–2001); Legends of Dune (2002–2004)	Dune (1965)
When the Tripods Came (1988)	The White Mountains (1967)
The Family Corleone (2012)	The Godfather (1969)
Gods and Generals (1996)	The Killer Angels (1974)
Ecotopia Emerging (1981)	Ecotopia (1975)
Castle Roogna (1979)	A Spell for Chameleon (1977)
Murder in Amityville (1979)	The Amityville Horror (1977)
First King of Shannara (1996)	The Sword of Shannara (1977)
Garden of Shadows (1986)	Flowers in the Attic (1979)
Hannibal Rising (2006)	Red Dragon (1981)
Prizzi's Family (1986)	Prizzi's Honor (1982)
The Life and Times of Scrooge McDuck (1995)	Carl Barks Library (1983–1990)
Myth-Ion Improbable (2001)	Hit or Myth (1983)
Patriot Games (1987); Red Rabbit (2002)	The Hunt for Red October (1984)
Invasion (2013)	Fallen Angels (1988)
The Dark Elf Trilogy (1990–1991)	The Icewind Dale Trilogy (1988–1990)
New Spring (1999)	The Wheel of Time (1990)
Once Upon a Time in the North (2008)	His Dark Materials (1995–2000)
Untitled Harry Potter short story (2008)	Harry Potter (1997–2007)
The Enemy (2004); The Affair (2011)	Killing Floor (1997) and other books in the Jack Reacher series
The Prophet of Yonwood (2006)	The City of Ember (2003)
Bluestar's Prophecy (2009); Crookedstar's Promise (2011)	Into the Wild (2003)
Ali's Pretty Little Lies (2013)	Pretty Little Liars (2006)
The Infernal Devices (2010); The Last Hours	The Mortal Instruments (2007)
The Kill Order (2012); The Fever Code (2016)	The Maze Runner (2009); The Scorch Trials (2010); The Death Cure (2011)
Pride and Prejudice and Zombies: Dawn of the Dreadfuls (2010)	Pride and Prejudice and Zombies (2009)
The Ballad of Songbirds and Snakes (2020); Sunrise on the Reaping (2025)	The Hunger Games (2008); Catching Fire (2009); Mockingjay (2010)
Darkwing (2007)	Silverwing (1997)
Mossflower (1988); Mariel of Redwall (1991); Salamandastron (1992); Martin the Warrior (1993); The Bellmaker (1994); Outcast of Redwall (1995); The Legend of Luke (1999); Lord Brocktree (2000)	Redwall (1986)

== Plays ==
Prequel	Original
Richard II; Henry IV, Part 1; Henry IV, Part 2; Henry V	Henry VI, Part 1; Henry VI, Part 2; Henry VI, Part 3; Richard III
Homelife (2007)	The Zoo Story (1958)

== Films ==
Prequel	Original
The Golem: How He Came into the World (1920)	The Golem (1915)
Hey! Hey! USA (1938)	Good Morning, Boys (1937)
Oz the Great and Powerful (2013); Wicked (2024); Wicked: For Good (2025)	The Wizard of Oz (1939)
Another Part of the Forest (1948)	The Little Foxes (1941)
Bambi II (2006, video)	Bambi (1942)
The Seventh Victim (1943)	Cat People (1942)
The Brute Man (1946)	House of Horrors (1946)
Davy Crockett and the River Pirates (1956)	Davy Crockett, King of the Wild Frontier (1955)
Psycho IV: The Beginning (1990, TV)	Psycho (1960)
Zulu Dawn (1979)	Zulu (1964)
The Good, the Bad and the Ugly (1966)	A Fistful of Dollars (1964); For a Few Dollars More (1965)
Godzilla vs. Hedorah (1971); Godzilla vs. Gigan (1972); Godzilla vs. Megalon (1973); Godzilla vs. Mechagodzilla (1974); Terror of Mechagodzilla (1975)	Destroy All Monsters (1968)
Escape from the Planet of the Apes (1971); Conquest of the Planet of the Apes (1972); Battle for the Planet of the Apes (1973)	Planet of the Apes (1968); Beneath the Planet of the Apes (1970)
Butch and Sundance: The Early Days (1979)	Butch Cassidy and the Sundance Kid (1969)
Easy Rider: The Ride Back (2012)	Easy Rider (1969)
The Rainbow (1989)	Women in Love (1969)
The Godfather Part II (1974)	The Godfather (1972)
Mortal Kombat: The Journey Begins (1995 animated film)	Mortal Kombat (1995)
Dominion: Prequel to the Exorcist (2005); Exorcist: The Beginning (2004)	The Exorcist (1973)
Leatherface (2017)	The Texas Chain Saw Massacre (1974)
Fatal Flying Guillotine (1977)	Master of the Flying Guillotine (1976)
Star Wars: Episode I – The Phantom Menace (1999); Star Wars: Episode II – Attack of the Clones (2002); Star Wars: The Clone Wars (2008); Star Wars: Episode III – Revenge of the Sith (2005); Rogue One: A Star Wars Story (2016); Solo: A Star Wars Story (2018)	Star Wars (1977)
Predator: Killer of Killers (2025); Prey (2022)	Predator (1987); Predator 2 (1990)
Alien vs. Predator (2004); Aliens vs. Predator: Requiem (2007)	The Predator (2018); Predators (2010); Predator: Badlands (2025)
Prometheus (2012); Alien: Covenant (2017)	Alien (1979)
Alien: Romulus (2024)	Aliens (1986); Alien 3 (1992); Alien Resurrection (1997)
Amityville II: The Possession (1982); The Amityville Murders (2018)	The Amityville Horror (1979)
Amityville 4: The Evil Escapes (1989, TV)	Amityville 3-D (1983)
Night of the Living Dead 3D: Re-Animation (2012)	Night of the Living Dead 3D (2006)
Cruella (2021)	101 Dalmatians (1996); 102 Dalmatians (2000)
Love Begins (2010, TV); Love's Everlasting Courage (2011, TV)	Love Comes Softly (2003, TV)
Kermit's Swamp Years (2002, video)	The Muppet Movie (1979)
Indiana Jones and the Temple of Doom (1984)	Raiders of the Lost Ark (1981)
The Fox and the Hound 2 (2006, video)	The Fox and the Hound (1981)
The Thing (2011)	The Thing (1982)
Caravan of Courage: An Ewok Adventure (1984, TV); Ewoks: The Battle for Endor (1985, TV)	Return of the Jedi (1983)
Missing in Action 2: The Beginning (1985)	Missing in Action (1984)
The First 9½ Weeks (1998, video)	9½ Weeks (1986); Another 9½ Weeks (1997, video)
Dirty Dancing: Havana Nights (2004)	Dirty Dancing (1987)
The Little Mermaid: Ariel's Beginning (2008, video)	The Little Mermaid (1989)
Puppet Master III: Toulon's Revenge (1991, video)	Puppet Master (1989, video); Puppet Master II (1991, video)
Tremors 4: The Legend Begins (2004, video)	Tremors (1990)
Twin Peaks: Fire Walk with Me (1992)	Twin Peaks (1990)
An American Tail: The Treasure of Manhattan Island (1998, video); An American Tail: The Mystery of the Night Monster (2000, video)	An American Tail: Fievel Goes West (1991)
Red Dragon (2002); Hannibal Rising (2007)	The Silence of the Lambs (1991); Hannibal (2001)
Carlito's Way: Rise to Power (2005, video)	Carlito's Way (1993)
Gods and Generals (2003)	Gettysburg (1993)
Dumb and Dumberer: When Harry Met Lloyd (2003)	Dumb and Dumber (1994)
Romy and Michele: In the Beginning (2005, TV)	Romy and Michele's High School Reunion (1997)
The Flintstones in Viva Rock Vegas (2000)	The Flintstones (1994)
The Lion King 1½ (2004, video)	The Lion King (1994)
Casper: A Spirited Beginning (1997, TV); Casper Meets Wendy (1998, TV)	Casper (1995)
Captain America: The First Avenger (2011); Captain Marvel (2019); Eternals (2021)	Iron Man (2008)
From Dusk Till Dawn 3: The Hangman's Daughter (2000, video)	From Dusk Till Dawn (1996); From Dusk Till Dawn 2: Texas Blood Money (1999)
Cube Zero (2004, video)	Cube (1997)
Joseph: King of Dreams (2000, video)	The Prince of Egypt (1998)
Ring 0: Birthday (2000)	Ring (1998)
The Brave Little Toaster to the Rescue (1999, video)	The Brave Little Toaster Goes to Mars (1998, video)
Cinderella III: A Twist in Time (2007, video)	Cinderella II: Dreams Come True (2002, video)
Cruel Intentions 2 (2001, video)	Cruel Intentions (1999)
Old Men in New Cars (2002)	In China They Eat Dogs (1999)
The Second Renaissance (2003 short animated film)	The Matrix (1999 live-action film)
Tarzan II (2005, video)	Tarzan (1999)
Final Destination 5 (2011)	Final Destination (2000)
Ginger Snaps Back: The Beginning (2004)	Ginger Snaps (2000)
X-Men Origins: Wolverine (2009); X-Men: First Class (2011); X-Men: Days of Future Past (2014); X-Men: Apocalypse (2016); Dark Phoenix (2019)	X-Men (2000)
Fantastic Beasts and Where to Find Them (2016); Fantastic Beasts: The Crimes of Grindelwald (2018); Fantastic Beasts: The Secrets of Dumbledore (2022)	Harry Potter and the Philosopher's Stone (2001)
La Tour 2 contrôle infernale (2016)	La Tour Montparnasse Infernale (2001)
Monsters University (2013)	Monsters, Inc. (2001)
The Hobbit: An Unexpected Journey (2012); The Hobbit: The Desolation of Smaug (2013); The Hobbit: The Battle of the Five Armies (2014); The Lord of the Rings: The War of the Rohirrim (2024) The Lord of the Rings: The Hunt for Gollum (2027)	The Lord of the Rings: The Fellowship of the Ring (2001); The Lord of the Rings: The Two Towers (2002); The Lord of the Rings: The Return of the King (2003)
Cabin Fever: Patient Zero (2014)	Cabin Fever (2002); Cabin Fever 2: Spring Fever (2009)
Infernal Affairs II (2003)	Infernal Affairs (2002)
National Lampoon's Van Wilder: Freshman Year (2009, video)	National Lampoon's Van Wilder (2002)
Dragonheart 3: The Sorcerer's Curse (2015); Dragonheart: Battle for the Heartfire (2017); Dragonheart: Vengeance (2020)	Dragonheart (1996)
Aileen Wuornos: American Boogeywoman (2021)	Monster (2003)
The Texas Chainsaw Massacre: The Beginning (2006)	The Texas Chainsaw Massacre (2003)
Bionicle 2: Legends of Metru Nui (2004, video); Bionicle 3: Web of Shadows (2005, video)	Bionicle: Mask of Light (2003, video)
Tinker Bell (2008-2015, video)	Peter Pan (1953)
Lilo & Stitch 2: Stitch Has a Glitch (2005, video)	Stitch! The Movie (2003, video)
Underworld: Rise of the Lycans (2009)	Underworld (2003); Underworld: Evolution (2006)
Wrong Turn 4: Bloody Beginnings (2011, video); Wrong Turn 5: Bloodlines (2012, video)	Wrong Turn (2003); Wrong Turn 2: Dead End (2007); Wrong Turn 3: Left for Dead (2009, video)
Leprechaun in the Hood (2000, video); Leprechaun: Back 2 tha Hood (2003, video)	Leprechaun 4: In Space (1997, video)
Hellraiser: Inferno (2000, video); Hellraiser: Hellseeker (2002, video); Hellraiser: Deader (2005, video); Hellraiser: Hellworld (2005, video); Hellraiser: Revelations (2011, video); Hellraiser: Judgment (2018, video)	Hellraiser: Bloodline (1996)
The Case of Hana & Alice (2015)	Hana and Alice (2004)
Puss in Boots (2011)	Shrek 2 (2004)
Van Helsing: The London Assignment (2004 animated film)	Van Helsing (2004)
The Dukes of Hazzard: The Beginning (2007, TV)	The Dukes of Hazzard (2005)
Fast & Furious (2009); Fast Five (2011); Fast & Furious 6 (2013)	The Fast and the Furious: Tokyo Drift (2006)
Billa II (2012)	Billa (2007)
Messengers 2: The Scarecrow (2009, video)	The Messengers (2007)
Paranormal Activity 2 (2010); Paranormal Activity 3 (2011)	Paranormal Activity (2007)
Smokin' Aces 2: Assassins' Ball (2010, video)	Smokin' Aces (2007)
Bumblebee (2018); Transformers: Rise of the Beasts (2023)	Transformers (2007)
Transmorphers: Fall of Man (2009, video)	Transmorphers (2007, video)
Vacancy 2: The First Cut (2009, video)	Vacancy (2007)
Marley & Me: The Puppy Years (2011, video)	Marley & Me (2008)
Death Race 2 (2010, video); Death Race 3: Inferno (2013, video)	Death Race (2008)
Open Season: Scared Silly (2016, video)	Open Season 3 (2011, video)
The Search for Santa Paws (2010); Santa Paws 2: The Santa Pups (2012)	Santa Buddies (2009)
Orphan: First Kill (2022)	Orphan (2009)
Minions & Monsters (2026); Minions (2015); Minions: The Rise of Gru (2022)	Despicable Me (2010)
Insidious: Chapter 3 (2015); Insidious: The Last Key (2018)	Insidious (2010); Insidious: Chapter 2 (2013)
Red Dog: True Blue (2016)	Red Dog (2011)
Annabelle (2014); Annabelle: Creation (2017); The Nun (2018); Annabelle Comes Home (2019); The Nun II (2023)	The Conjuring (2013); The Conjuring 2 (2016)
The First Purge (2018)	The Purge (2013); The Purge: Anarchy (2014); The Purge: Election Year (2016); The Forever Purge (2021)
Rise of the Footsoldier: The Pat Tate Story (2017); Rise of the Footsoldier: Marbella (2019); Rise of the Footsoldier: Origins (2021)	Rise of the Footsoldier (2007)
Wonder Woman (2017); Wonder Woman 1984 (2020)	Man of Steel (2013); Batman v Superman: Dawn of Justice (2016); Justice League (2017)
Zack Snyder's Justice League (2021)	Aquaman (2018)
Kong: Skull Island (2017)	Godzilla (2014); Godzilla: King of the Monsters (2019); Godzilla vs. Kong (2021); Godzilla x Kong: The New Empire (2024)
Wonder Woman: Bloodlines (2019, video)	Justice League: War (2014, video)
Ouija: Origin of Evil (2016)	Ouija (2014)
The King's Man (2021)	Kingsman: The Secret Service (2014); Kingsman: The Golden Circle (2017)
The Hunger Games: The Ballad of Songbirds & Snakes (2023) The Hunger Games: Sunrise on the Reaping (2026)	The Hunger Games (2012); The Hunger Games: Catching Fire (2013); The Hunger Games: Mockingjay – Part 1 (2014); The Hunger Games: Mockingjay – Part 2 (2015)
Saw X (2023)	Saw II (2005)
The First Omen (2024)	The Omen (1976)
Bereavement (2010)	Malevolence (2004)
Amici miei - Come tutto ebbe inizio (2011)	My Friends (1975)
Black Widow (2021)	Avengers: Infinity War (2018)
Pearl (2022)	X (2022)
The Scorpion King 2: Rise of a Warrior (2008, video)	The Scorpion King (2002)
The Scorpion King (2002); The Scorpion King 3: Battle for Redemption (2012, video); The Scorpion King 4: Quest for Power (2015, video); The Scorpion King: Book of Souls (2018, video)	The Mummy (1999); The Mummy Returns (2001)
Candyman (2021)	Candyman 3: Day of the Dead (1999, video)
A Quiet Place: Day One (2024)	A Quiet Place (2018)
Mufasa: The Lion King (2024)	The Lion King (2019)
Jigarthanda DoubleX (2023)	Jigarthanda (2014)
From the World of John Wick: Ballerina (2025)	John Wick: Chapter 4 (2023)
Kantara: Chapter 1 (2025)	Kantara: A Legend (2022)
They Call Him OG (2025)	Saaho (2019)
John Rambo (2027)	First Blood (1982)
Clayface (2026)	Superman (2025)
Aurora Teagarden Mysteries: Something New (2023, TV), Aurora Teagarden Mysteries: A Lesson in Murder (2024, TV); Aurora Teagarden Mysteries: Death at the Diner (2024, TV)	A Bone to Pick: An Aurora Teagarden Mystery (2015, TV)

== Channel and television series ==
Prequel	Original
Baby Looney Tunes (2002–2005)	Looney Tunes (1930–present)
Smallville (2001–2011)	Superman (1939–present)
Pennyworth (2019–2022); Gotham (2014–2019)	Batman (1940–present)
Tom & Jerry Kids (1990–1993)	Tom & Jerry (1940–1967; 2001; 2005)
Ponderosa (2001–2002)	Bonanza (1959–1973)
Bates Motel (2013–2017)	Psycho (1959 novel)
Crystal Lake: Friday... (2026 episode; season 1)	Crystal Lake: Camp Crystal (2026 episode; season 1); Friday the 13th (1980 film)
The Flintstone Kids (1986–1988)	The Flintstones (1960–1966)
Yo Yogi! (1991–1992)	The Yogi Bear Show (1961–1962)
Ratched (2020–present)	One Flew Over the Cuckoo's Nest (novel/film) (1962/1975)
Pink Panther and Pals (2010)	The Pink Panther (1964–1980)
Star Trek: Enterprise (2001–2005); Star Trek: Discovery (2017–2024); Star Trek: Strange New Worlds (2022–present)	Star Trek (1966–1969)
The New Archies (1987–1988)	The Archie Show (1968–1969)
Pufnstuf (1970)	H.R. Pufnstuf (1969–1970)
A Pup Named Scooby-Doo (1988–1991); Scooby-Doo! Mystery Incorporated (2010–2013)	Scooby-Doo, Where Are You! (1969–1970)
First of the Summer Wine (1988–1989)	Last of the Summer Wine (1973–2010)
Muppet Babies (1984 cartoon) or Muppet Babies (2018 cartoon)	The Muppet Show (1974-1981 including syndication); The Muppet Movie (1979)
Casper's Halloween Special (1979); Casper's First Christmas (1979)	Casper and the Angels (1979)
Clarice (2021)	Hannibal (2001 film)
Hannibal (2013–2015)	Red Dragon (1981 novel)
Alien: Earth: In Space, No One... (2025 episode; season 1)	Alien: Earth: Neverland (2025 episode; season 1); Alien (1979 film)
House of the Dragon (2022- ) A Knight of the Seven Kingdoms (2026- )	Game of Thrones (2011-2019)
Rock & Chips (2010–2011)	Only Fools & Horses (1981–2003)
Freddy's Nightmares: No More Mr. Nice Guy (October 9, 1988)	A Nightmare on Elm Street (November 9, 1984)
ALF: The Animated Series (1987–1989)	ALF (1986–1990)
Endeavour (2012–2023)	Inspector Morse (1987–2000); Lewis (2006-2015)
Rugrats Pre-School Daze (2005); Rugrats (2021-present reboot)	Rugrats (1991–2004)
Young Hercules (1998–1999)	Hercules: The Legendary Journeys (1995–1999)
The Carrie Diaries (2013–2014)	Sex and the City (1998–2004)
The Wild Thornberrys: Gift of Gab (2000 episode - Season 2)	The Wild Thornberrys: Flood Warning (1998 episode - Season 1)
Justice League (2001–2004); Justice League Unlimited (2004–2006)	Batman Beyond (1999–2001)
Kamp Koral: SpongeBob's Under Years (2020–2024)	SpongeBob SquarePants (1999–present)
Walking with Monsters (2005)	Walking with Dinosaurs (1999)
Clifford's Puppy Days (2003–2006)	Clifford the Big Red Dog (2000–2003)
Caprica (2010 TV series); Battlestar Galactica: Blood & Chrome (2012 online series)	Battlestar Galactica (2003 miniseries)
Gossip Girl: Valley Girls (2009 episode - season 2)	Gossip Girl (2007)
Etheria (2005–2006)	Encantadia (2005)
Meerkat Manor: The Story Begins (2008)	Meerkat Manor (2005–2008)
1883 (2021-22); 1923 (2022-25)	Yellowstone (2018-24)
Westside (2015)	Outrageous Fortune (2005–2010)
Young Sheldon (2017–2024); Georgie & Mandy's First Marriage (2024-present)	The Big Bang Theory (2007–2019)
Total DramaRama (2018)	Total Drama Island (2007–2008)
Better Call Saul (2015–2022)	Breaking Bad (2008–2013)
We Baby Bears (2022–present)	We Bare Bears (2015–2019)
Craig Before the Creek (2023 film)	Craig of the Creek (2018–present)
Spartacus: Gods of the Arena (2011)	Spartacus: Blood and Sand (2010)
Fear the Walking Dead (2015–2023)	The Walking Dead (2010–2022)
Transformers One (2024 film)	The Transformers (1984-1987)
Sonic the Hedgehog SatAM (1993-1994)	Adventures of Sonic the Hedgehog (1993-1996)
Mickey Mouse Clubhouse: Oh Toodles (2016 episode - Season 4)	Mickey Mouse Clubhouse: Donald's Brand New Clubhouse (2015 episode - Season 4)
The Amazing World of Gumball: The Origins (2016 episodes - Season 4); The Amazing World of Gumball: The Rival (2018 episode - Season 6)	The Amazing World of Gumball: The DVD / The Responsible (2011 episodes - Season 1)
Mixed-ish (2019–2021)	Black-ish (2014–2022); Grown-ish (2018–2024)
PJ Masks: PJ Robot / PJ Power Up (2018 episodes - Season 2)	PJ Masks: Wacky Floats / Romeo's Disguise (2018 episodes - Season 2)
PJ Masks: Take Romeo Off The Road / Mission: PJ Seeker (2019 episodes - Season 3)	PJ Masks: PJ Racing (2019 short)
Pretty Little Liars: The First Secret (2011 episode - Season 2)	Pretty Little Liars: Pilot (2010 episode - Season 1)
Abby Hatcher: When Abby Met Bozzly (2019 episode - Season 1)	Abby Hatcher: Abby's Squeaky Peeper Panic (2019 episode - Season 1)
The VeggieTales Show: God Wants Us To Make Peace (2020 episode - Season 1)	The VeggieTales Show: The Best Christmas Gift (2019 episode - Season 1)
The Loud House: Schooled! (2020 special episode - Season 5)	The Casagrandes: Cursed! (2020 special episode - Season 1)
VeggieTales: Duke and the Great Pie War (2005 episode)	VeggieTales: King George and the Ducky (2000 episode)
Where's Waldo?: Flipping for Japan (2021 episode - Season 2)	Where's Waldo?: Gibraltar Rocks! (2020 episode - Season 2)
The Loud House: Great Lakes Freakout! (2022 special episode - Season 6)	The Casagrandes: Race Against the Machine / My Fair Cat Lady (2022 episodes - Season 3)
The Casagrandes: Phantom Freakout (2022 special episode - Season 3)	The Loud House: Hiccups and Downs / The Loathe Boat (2022 episodes - Season 6); The Casagrandes: Sidekickin' Chicken / Silent Fight (2022 episodes - Season 3)
The Purge (2018–2019)	The Purge: Election Year (2016); The Forever Purge (2021)
The Acolyte (2024)	Star Wars: Episode I – The Phantom Menace (1999)
The Mandalorian (2019–present); The Book of Boba Fett (2021–2022); Ahsoka (2023–present); Star Wars: Skeleton Crew (2024)	Star Wars: The Force Awakens (2015)
Andor (2022–25)	Rogue One: A Star Wars Story (2016)
Dexter: Original Sin (2024–25)	Dexter (2006-2013)

== Feature films ==
Prequel	Original
The Turbo Charged Prelude for 2 Fast 2 Furious (2003); Los Bandoleros (2009)	2 Fast 2 Furious (2003); Fast & Furious (2009)
The Origin of Stitch (2005)	Stitch! The Movie (2003, video)
Pirates of the Caribbean: Tales of the Code – Wedlocked (2011)	Pirates of the Caribbean: The Curse of the Black Pearl (2003)
Rings (2005)	The Ring Two (2005)
The Final Chapter: The Death of Xander Cage (2005)	XXX: State of the Union (2005)
TED 2023 (2012)	Prometheus (2012)
Quarantine (2014); All Fall Down (2014); The Gun (2014)	Dawn of the Planet of the Apes (2014)
Alien: Covenant – Prologue: The Crossing (2017)	Alien: Covenant (2017)
Blade Runner Black Out 2022 (2017); 2036: Nexus Dawn (2017); 2048: Nowhere to Run (2017)	Blade Runner 2049 (2017)
Under the Sea: A Descendants Story (2018)	Descendants 3 (2019, video)
The Sire (2003)	The Young Black Stallion (2003)
Lilo & Scratch (2026)	Lilo & Stitch 2: Stitch Has a Glitch (2005, video)

== Albums ==
Prequel	Original
Act II: The Father of Death (2009)	The Protomen (2005)

== Music videos ==
Prequel	Original
Green Day: "Holiday" (2005)	"Boulevard of Broken Dreams" (2004)
Carrie Underwood: "Last Name" (2008)	"Before He Cheats" (2006)
Iyaz: "Replay (Prequel)" (2009)	"Replay" (2009)
LMFAO: "Sorry for Party Rocking" (2012)	"Party Rock Anthem" (2011)
Bebe Rexha: "Heart Wants What It Wants (The Prequel)" (2023)	"Heart Wants What It Wants" (2023)
Japanese Breakfast: "Savage Good Boy" (2021)	"Posing in Bondage" (2021)

== Comics ==
Prequel	Original
Superboy (1945–)	Action Comics (1938–); Superman (1939–)
Scrooge Mcduck - The Dragon Of Glasgow (2023)	DuckTales Comics (1985–); DuckTales 2017 Comics
Transformers '84 (2019)	The Transformers (1984-1991)
All Star Batman and Robin the Boy Wonder (2005)	Batman: The Dark Knight Returns (1986)
The Man Who Falls (1989)	Batman: Year One (1987)
Tales of the Jedi: The Golden Age of the Sith (1997); Tales of the Jedi: The Fall of the Sith Empire (1998)	Tales of the Jedi series (1994–1996)
Batman and the Monster Men (2005–2006); Batman and the Mad Monk (2006–2007); Batman: The Man Who Laughs (2005)	Batman: The Long Halloween (1996–1997); Batman: Dark Victory (1999–2000)
The Kingdom (1999)	Kingdom Come (1996)
Mr. and Mrs. Spider-Man (2008–2009)	Spider-Girl (1998–1999); Amazing Spider-Girl (2006–2009)
Marvel Nemesis: Rise of the Imperfects (comics) (2005–2006)	Marvel Nemesis: Rise of the Imperfects (2005)
Marvel Zombies vs. The Army of Darkness (2007); Marvel Zombies: Dead Days (2007)	Marvel Zombies (2005–2006)

== Consoles, computer and video games ==
Prequel	Original
Ninja Gaiden (2004); Ninja Gaiden: Dragon Sword (2008); Ninja Gaiden II (2008); Ninja Gaiden 3 (2012); Ninja Gaiden 4 (2025); Ninja Gaiden Shadow (1991)	Ninja Gaiden (1988); Ninja Gaiden: Ragebound (2025)
Ninja Gaiden III: The Ancient Ship of Doom (1991)	Ninja Gaiden II: The Dark Sword of Chaos (1990)
Super Mario World 2: Yoshi's Island (1995); Yoshi's New Island (2014); Yoshi's Island DS (2006); Yoshi's Story (1997); Yoshi's Woolly World (2015); Yoshi's Crafted World (2019)	Yoshi's Universal Gravitation (2004); Yoshi and the Mysterious Book (2026)
Ion Fury/Ion Fury: Aftershock (2019/2021); Phantom Fury (2024)	Bombshell (2016)
Bayonetta Origins: Cereza and the Lost Demon (2023)	Bayonetta (2009); Bayonetta 2 (2014); Bayonetta 3 (2022)
Sacred 2: Fallen Angel (2008)	Sacred (2004)
Daymare: 1994 Sandcastle (2023)	Daymare: 1998 (2019)
Fire 'n Ice (1992)	Solomon's Key (1986)
Ys Origin (2020)	Ys I: Ancient Ys Vanished (1987); Ys II: Ancient Ys Vanished – The Final Chapter (1988)
Ys X: Nordics (2023); Ys: Memories of Celceta (2012)	Ys III: Wanderers from Ys (1989); Ys V: Lost Kefin, Kingdom of Sand (1995)
Ys VIII: Lacrimosa of Dana (2016)	Ys VI: The Ark of Napishtim (2003); Ys Seven (2009); Ys IX: Monstrum Nox (2021)
Yandere Simulator 1980s Mode (2023)	Yandere Simulator (2014-present)
Silent Hill: Origins (2007)	Silent Hill (1999); Silent Hill 2 (2001)
Silent Hill: Homecoming (2008)	Silent Hill 3 (2003); Silent Hill 4: The Room (2004); Silent Hill: Downpour (2012)
Xenoblade Genesis (2027)	Xenoblade Chronicles (2010); Xenoblade Chronicles 2 (2017); Xenoblade Chronicles 3 (2022)
Doom: The Dark Ages/Doom: The Dark Ages - Revelations (2025/2026)	Doom (2016); Doom Eternal (2020)
Mafia: The Old Country/Mafia: The Old Country - Man of Honor (2025/2026)	Mafia (2002); Mafia II (2010); Mafia III (2016)
Lies of P: Overture (2025)	Lies of P (2023)
Pokémon Legends: Arceus (2022)	Pokémon Diamond and Pearl/Pokémon Platinum/Pokémon Brilliant Diamond and Shining Pearl (2006/2008/2021)
Metroid Prime (2002); Metroid Prime Hunters (2006); Metroid Prime 2: Echoes (2004); Metroid Prime 3: Corruption (2007); Metroid Prime: Federation Force (2016)	Metroid II: Return of Samus (1991); Super Metroid (1994)
Metroid: Other M (2010); Metroid Prime 4: Beyond (2025)	Metroid Fusion (2002); Metroid Dread (2021); Metroid Ravenous (2027)
Metro Awakening (2024)	Metro 2033 (2010); Metro: Last Light (2013); Metro Exodus (2019); Metro 2039 (2027)
Fear Effect 2: Retro Helix (2001)	Fear Effect (2000)
Metal Gear Solid 3: Snake Eater (2004); Metal Gear Solid: Portable Ops (2006); Metal Gear Solid: Peace Walker (2010); Metal Gear Solid V: Ground Zeroes/Metal Gear Solid V: The Phantom Pain (2014/2015)	Metal Gear (1987); Metal Gear 2: Solid Snake (1990); Metal Gear Solid (1998); Metal Gear Solid 2: Sons of Liberty (2001); Metal Gear Solid 4: Guns of the Patriots (2008); Metal Gear Rising: Revengeance (2013)
Deus Ex: Human Revolution/Deus Ex: Human Revolution – The Missing Link (2011); Deus Ex: The Fall (2013); Deus Ex: Mankind Divided (2016)	Deus Ex (2000); Deus Ex: Invisible War (2003)
God of War Sons of Sparta (2026); God of War: Ascension (2013); God of War: Chains of Olympus (2008)	God of War (2005)
God of War: Ghost of Sparta (2010); God of War: Betrayal (2007)	God of War II (2007); God of War III (2010); God of War (2018); God of War Ragnarök/God of War Ragnarök: Valhalla (2022); God of War Laufey (2027)
Ratchet & Clank: Size Matters (2007); Secret Agent Clank (2008)	Ratchet & Clank Future: Tools of Destruction (2007); Ratchet & Clank Future: Quest for Booty (2008); Ratchet & Clank Future: A Crack in Time (2009); Ratchet & Clank: All 4 One (2011); Ratchet & Clank: Full Frontal Assault (2012); Ratchet & Clank: Into the Nexus (2013); Ratchet & Clank: Rift Apart (2021)
Daxter (2006)	Jak II (2003); Jak 3 (2004); Jak X: Combat Racing (2005); Jak and Daxter: The Lost Frontier (2009)
The Legend of Zelda: The Minish Cap (2005)	The Legend of Zelda: Four Swords (2002)
The Legend of Zelda: Skyward Sword (2011)	The Legend of Zelda
Hyrule Warriors: Age of Calamity (2020)	The Legend of Zelda: Breath of the Wild (2017)
Crisis Core: Final Fantasy VII (2007); Before Crisis: Final Fantasy VII (2004)	Final Fantasy VII (1997)
Kingdom Hearts Birth by Sleep (2010)	Kingdom Hearts (2002)
Resident Evil Zero (2002)	Resident Evil (1996)
Resident Evil Outbreak/Resident Evil Outbreak: File 2 (2003/2004); Resident Evil 3: Nemesis (1999)	Resident Evil 2 (1998); Resident Evil Survivor (2000); Resident Evil – Code: Veronica (2000); Resident Evil: Dead Aim (2003); Resident Evil 4 (2005)
Resident Evil: Revelations (2012)	Resident Evil 5 (2009)
Resident Evil: Revelations 2 (2015); Umbrella Corps (2016)	Resident Evil 6 (2012); Resident Evil 7: Biohazard (2017); Resident Evil Village (2021); Resident Evil Requiem (2026)
Devil May Cry 3: Dante's Awakening (2005)	Devil May Cry (2001)
Devil May Cry 2 (2003)	Devil May Cry 4 (2008); Devil May Cry 5 (2019)
Resonance: A Plague Tale Legacy (2026)	A Plague Tale: Innocence (2019); A Plague Tale: Requiem (2022)
Suikoden IV (2005); Suikoden Tactics (2005); Suikoden V (2006)	Suikoden (1996)
Heroes of Might and Magic III: The Shadow of Death (2000)	Heroes of Might and Magic III: Armageddon's Blade (1999)
Homeworld: Deserts of Kharak (2016)	Homeworld (1999)
Samurai Shodown V (2003); Samurai Shodown (2019)	Samurai Shodown (1993)
Samurai Shodown III (1995); Samurai Shodown IV (1996)	Samurai Shodown II (1994); Samurai Shodown 64 (1997); Samurai Shodown 64: Warriors Rage (1998)
Samurai Shodown Sen (2008)	Samurai Shodown: Warriors Rage (1999)
Tenchu 2: Birth of the Stealth Assassins (2000); Tenchu: Dark Secret (2006)	Tenchu: Stealth Assassins (1998); Tenchu: Wrath of Heaven (2003); Tenchu: Fatal Shadows (2004); Tenchu: Time of the Assassins (2005); Tenchu: Shadow Assassins (2008)
Halo Wars (2009); Halo: Reach (2010)	Halo: Combat Evolved (2001); Halo 2 (2004)
Halo 3: ODST (2009)	Halo 3 (2007)
Halo: Spartan Assault (2013)	Halo 4 (2012)
Halo: Spartan Strike (2015)	Halo 5: Guardians (2015)
Halo Wars 2 (2017)	Halo Infinite (2021)
Mortal Kombat: Special Forces (2000); Mortal Kombat Mythologies: Sub-Zero (1997)	Mortal Kombat (1992); Mortal Kombat II (1993); Mortal Kombat 3 (1995); Mortal Kombat 4 (1997); Mortal Kombat: Deadly Alliance (2002); Mortal Kombat: Deception (2004); Mortal Kombat: Armageddon (2006)
Contract J.A.C.K. (2003)	No One Lives Forever 2: A Spy in H.A.R.M.'s Way (2002)
Call of Juarez: Bound in Blood (2009)	Call of Juarez (2006)
Grand Theft Auto: Vice City Stories (2006); Grand Theft Auto: Vice City (2002); Grand Theft Auto: San Andreas (2004); Grand Theft Auto: Liberty City Stories (2005); Grand Theft Auto Advance (2004)	Grand Theft Auto III (2001); Grand Theft Auto IV/Grand Theft Auto IV: The Lost and Damned/Grand Theft Auto: The Ballad of Gay Tony (2008/2009); Grand Theft Auto: Chinatown Wars (2009); Grand Theft Auto V (2013); Grand Theft Auto VI (2026)
Serious Sam 4 (2020); Serious Sam 3: BFE (2011)	Serious Sam: The First Encounter/Serious Sam: The Second Encounter (2001/2002)
S.T.A.L.K.E.R.: Clear Sky (2008)	S.T.A.L.K.E.R.: Shadow of Chernobyl (2007); S.T.A.L.K.E.R.: Call of Pripyat (2010); S.T.A.L.K.E.R. 2: Heart of Chornobyl (2024)
Fatal Frame: Mask of the Lunar Eclipse (2008)	Fatal Frame (2002); Fatal Frame II: Crimson Butterfly (2003); Fatal Frame III: The Tormented (2005); Fatal Frame: Maiden of Black Water (2014)
Lufia II: Rise of the Sinistrals (1996)	Lufia & the Fortress of Doom (1993)
Far Cry Primal (2016); Far Cry 2 (2008); Far Cry 3 (2012); Far Cry 4 (2014); Far Cry 5 (2018); Far Cry 6 (2021)	Far Cry (2004)
NecroVisioN: Lost Company (2010)	NecroVisioN (2009)
Valkyrie Profile 2: Silmeria (2006)	Valkyrie Profile: Lenneth (1999)
Tales of Symphonia (2004)	Tales of Phantasia (1995)
Fire Emblem: The Blazing Blade (2003)	Fire Emblem: The Binding Blade (2002)
Dragon Quest III (1988)	Dragon Quest I (1986)
Dragon Quest Yangus (2006)	Dragon Quest VIII: Journey of the Cursed King (2004)
Zork Zero: The Revenge of Megaboz (1988)	Zork I: The Great Underground Empire (1980)
Perfect Dark Zero (2005)	Perfect Dark (2000)
Castlevania: Lament of Innocence (2003); Castlevania III: Dracula's Curse (1990); Castlevania: Curse of Darkness (2005); Castlevania: Belmont's Curse (2026); Castlevania: The Adventure (1989); Castlevania II: Belmont's Revenge (1991)	Castlevania (1986); Castlevania II: Simon's Quest (1987)
Castlevania: Harmony of Dissonance (2002)	Castlevania: Rondo of Blood (1993); Castlevania: Symphony of the Night (1997)
Castlevania: Order of Ecclesia (2008); Castlevania Bloodlines (1994); Castlevania: Portrait of Ruin (2006)	Castlevania: Aria of Sorrow (2003); Castlevania: Dawn of Sorrow (2005)
Atelier Iris 2: The Azoth of Destiny (2005)	Atelier Iris: Eternal Mana (2004)
Lunar: Dragon Song (2005)	Lunar: The Silver Star (1992)
Baten Kaitos Origins (2006)	Baten Kaitos: Eternal Wings and the Lost Ocean (2003)
Enemy Territory: Quake Wars (2007)	Quake II (1997); Quake 4 (2005)
Banjo-Kazooie: Grunty's Revenge (2003)	Banjo-Tooie (2000); Banjo-Kazooie: Nuts & Bolts (2008)
Rayman Origins (2011); Rayman Legends (2013)	Rayman (1995); Rayman 2: The Great Escape (1999); Rayman 3: Hoodlum Havoc (2003)
SegaSonic the Hedgehog (1993); Tails' Skypatrol (1995); Sonic Labyrinth (1995); Sonic CD (1993); Tails Adventure (1995)	Sonic the Hedgehog 2 (1992); Sonic Chaos (1993); Sonic the Hedgehog 3/Sonic & Knuckles (1994); Sonic the Hedgehog: Triple Trouble (1994); Knuckles' Chaotix (1995); Sonic 3D Blast (1996); Sonic Blast (1996); Sonic the Hedgehog 4: Episode I/Sonic the Hedgehog 4: Episode II (2010/2012); Sonic Mania (2017)
Sonic Superstars (2023)	Sonic Adventure (1998); Sonic Adventure 2 (2001); Sonic Advance (2001); Sonic Advance 2 (2002); Sonic Heroes (2003)
Shadow the Hedgehog (2005)	Sonic Battle (2003); Sonic Advance 3 (2004); Sonic Rush (2005); Sonic Rush Adventure (2007)
Sonic and the Secret Rings (2007)	Sonic Unleashed (2008); Sonic and the Black Knight (2009); Sonic Colors (2010); Sonic Generations/Shadow Generations (2011/2024); Sonic Lost World (2013); Sonic Forces (2017); Sonic Frontiers (2022)
Vindictus (2010)	Mabinogi (2004)
Dissidia 012 Final Fantasy (2011)	Dissidia: Final Fantasy (2008)
Dead to Rights: Reckoning (2005); Dead to Rights II (2004)	Dead to Rights (2002)
Dead Space: Extraction (2009)	Dead Space (2008)
Dead Space (2011); Dead Space Ignition (2010)	Dead Space 2 (2011); Dead Space 3 (2013)
Batman: Arkham Origins (2013); Batman: Arkham Origins Blackgate (2013); Batman: Arkham Shadow (2024)	Batman: Arkham Asylum (2009)
Batman: Arkham City Lockdown (2011)	Batman: Arkham City (2011)
Batman: Arkham VR (2016)	Batman: Arkham Knight (2015)
Medal of Honor: Rising Sun (2003); Medal of Honor: Pacific Assault (2004); Medal of Honor: European Assault (2005); Medal of Honor: Vanguard (2007); Medal of Honor: Airborne (2007); Medal of Honor: Underground (2000); Medal of Honor: Allied Assault (2002)	Medal of Honor (1999)
Medal of Honor: Frontline (2002)	Medal of Honor: Heroes (2006); Medal of Honor: Heroes 2 (2007)
Borderlands: The Pre-Sequel (2014)	Borderlands 2 (2012)
Tales from the Borderlands (2014)	Borderlands 3 (2019)
New Tales from the Borderlands (2022)	Borderlands 4 (2025)
Assassin's Creed Odyssey/Assassin's Creed Odyssey – Legacy of the First Blade (2018); Assassin's Creed Origins (2017); Assassin's Creed Mirage (2023); Assassin's Creed Valhalla (2020); Assassin's Creed: Altaïr's Chronicles (2008)	Assassin's Creed/Assassin's Creed: Bloodlines (2007/2009); Assassin's Creed II/Assassin's Creed II: Discovery (2009); Assassin's Creed: Brotherhood (2010); Assassin's Creed Revelations (2011)
Assassin's Creed Chronicles: China (2015); Assassin's Creed Shadows (2025); Assassin's Creed IV: Black Flag/Assassin's Creed Freedom Cry (2013); Assassin's Creed Rogue (2014)	Assassin's Creed III/Assassin's Creed III: Liberation/Assassin's Creed III: The Tyranny of King Washington (2012/2013); Assassin's Creed Unity (2014)
Assassin's Creed Chronicles: India (2015)	Assassin's Creed Syndicate/Assassin's Creed Syndicate: Jack the Ripper (2015); Assassin's Creed Chronicles: Russia (2015)
Professor Layton and the Last Specter (2009); Professor Layton and the Miracle Mask (2011); Professor Layton and the Azran Legacy (2013)	Professor Layton and the Curious Village (2007); Professor Layton and the Diabolical Box (2007); Professor Layton and the Unwound Future (2008)
LEGO The Hobbit (2014)	LEGO The Lord of the Rings (2012)
LEGO City Undercover: The Chase Begins (2013)	LEGO City Undercover (2013)
Stranger Than Heaven (2027); Yakuza 0 (2015)	Yakuza (2005); Yakuza 2 (2006); Yakuza 3 (2009); Yakuza 4 (2010); Yakuza 5 (2012); Yakuza 6: The Song of Life (2016); Yakuza: Like a Dragon (2020); Like a Dragon Gaiden: The Man Who Erased His Name (2023); Like a Dragon: Infinite Wealth (2024); Like a Dragon: Pirate Yakuza in Hawaii (2025)
Lost Planet 3 (2013)	Lost Planet: Extreme Condition (2006); Lost Planet 2 (2010)
Prince of Persia: The Forgotten Sands (2010)	Prince of Persia: Warrior Within (2004)
Drakensang: The River of Time (2010)	Drakensang: The Dark Eye (2009)
Five Nights at Freddy's 2 (2014)	Five Nights at Freddy's (2014)
Infamous First Light (2014)	Infamous Second Son (2014)
Wolfenstein: The Old Blood (2015)	Wolfenstein: The New Order (2014)
Outlast: Whistleblower (2014); The Outlast Trials (2022)	Outlast (2013); Outlast 2 (2017)
Gears of War: E-Day (2026); Gears of War: Judgment (2013); Gears Tactics (2020); Gears of War: RAAM's Shadow (2011)	Gears of War (2006); Gears of War 2 (2008); Gears of War 3 (2011); Gears of War 4 (2016); Gears 5 (2019)
Life Is Strange: Before the Storm (2017)	Life Is Strange (2015)
Red Dead Redemption 2 (2018)	Red Dead Redemption (2010)
Fallout 76 (2018)	Fallout (1997); Fallout 2 (1998); Fallout 3 (2008); Fallout: New Vegas (2010); Fallout 4 (2015)
Half-Life: Alyx (2020)	Half-Life 2 (2004)
Nioh 2 (2020)	Nioh (2017); Nioh 3 (2026)
Desperados III (2020)	Desperados: Wanted Dead or Alive (2001)
Driver 76 (2007)	Driver 3 (2004)
Driver: San Francisco (2011)	Driver (1999)
Driver: Renegade (2011)	Driver 2 (2000); Driver: Parallel Lines (2006)
Road 96: Mile 0 (2023)	Road 96 (2021)
Uncharted: Golden Abyss (2011)	Uncharted: Drake's Fortune (2007); Uncharted 2: Among Thieves (2009); Uncharted 3: Drake's Deception (2011); Uncharted 4: A Thief's End (2016)
Way of the Samurai 2 (2003)	Way of the Samurai (2002); Way of the Samurai 3 (2008); Way of the Samurai 4 (2011)
Sniper Elite III (2014); Sniper Elite 4 (2017); Sniper Elite 5 (2022); Sniper Elite: Resistance (2025)	Sniper Elite V2 (2012)
Darksiders Genesis (2019)	Darksiders (2010); Darksiders II (2012); Darksiders III (2018)
Hard Corps: Uprising (2011)	Contra (1987); Super Contra (1988); Operation C (1991); Contra III: The Alien Wars (1992); Contra 4 (2007)
Contra: Rogue Corps (2019)	Contra: Hard Corps (1994); Contra: Shattered Soldier (2002); Neo Contra (2004)
Resistance: Burning Skies (2012); Resistance: Retribution (2009)	Resistance 2 (2008); Resistance 3 (2011)
Killzone: Mercenary (2013)	Killzone 3 (2011); Killzone Shadow Fall (2013)
Mega Man Xtreme (2000)	Mega Man X3 (1995)
Mega Man Xtreme 2 (2001)	Mega Man X4 (1997); Mega Man X5 (2000); Mega Man X6 (2001); Mega Man X7 (2003); Mega Man X8 (2004)
Mega Man Zero (2002); Mega Man Zero 2 (2003); Mega Man Zero 3 (2004); Mega Man Zero 4 (2005); Mega Man ZX (2006); Mega Man ZX Advent (2007); The Misadventures of Tron Bonne (1999)	Mega Man Legends (1997); Mega Man Legends 2 (2000)
Dark Reign 2 (2000)	Dark Reign: The Future of War (1997)
RayCrisis (1998)	RayForce (1994)
Forever Kingdom (2001)	Evergrace (2000)
The Inpatient (2018)	Until Dawn (2015); Until Dawn 2 (2027)
Cybernator (1992)	Target Earth (1990)
Styx: Master of Shadows (2014); Styx: Shards of Darkness (2017); Styx: Blades of Greed (2026)	Of Orcs and Men (2012)
Call of Duty: Black Ops Cold War (2020); Call of Duty: Black Ops 6 (2024)	Call of Duty: Black Ops II (2012)
Call of Duty: Black Ops 7 (2025); Call of Duty: Black Ops 4 (2018)	Call of Duty: Black Ops III (2015)
Street Fighter Alpha 2 (1996); Street Fighter Alpha 3 (1998)	Street Fighter II (1991)
Street Fighter IV (2008); Street Fighter V (2016)	Street Fighter III: New Generation (1997); Street Fighter III: 3rd Strike (1999); Street Fighter 6 (2023)
Art of Fighting (1992); Art of Fighting 2 (1994); Art of Fighting 3: The Path of the Warrior (1996)	Fatal Fury: King of Fighters (1991); Fatal Fury 2 (1992); Fatal Fury 3: Road to the Final Victory (1995); Real Bout Fatal Fury (1995); Garou: Mark of the Wolves (1999); Fatal Fury: City of the Wolves (2025)
Battlefield 1 (2016)	Battlefield 1942 (2002); Battlefield 1943 (2009)
Battlefield V (2018)	Battlefield: Vietnam (2004); Battlefield 2 (2005); Battlefield 3 (2011); Battlefield 4 (2013)
Battlefield 6 (2025); Battlefield 2042 (2021)	Battlefield 2142 (2006)
Wipeout 2048 (2012)	Wipeout (1995); Wipeout 2097 (1996); Wipeout 64 (1998); Wipeout 3 (1999); Wipeout Fusion (2002); Wipeout Pure (2005); Wipeout Pulse (2007); Wipeout HD (2008)
Ax Battler: A Legend of Golden Axe (1991)	Golden Axe (1989); Golden Axe II (1991)
Golden Axe (2027)	Golden Axe III (1993)
Golden Axe: The Revenge of Death Adder (1992)	Golden Axe: The Duel (1995)
Double Dragon IV (2017)	Double Dragon 3: The Rosetta Stone (1990)
GreedFall 2: The Dying World (2026)	GreedFall (2019)
The G.G. Shinobi (1991); The G.G. Shinobi II: The Silent Fury (1993)	Shinobi (1987); The Revenge of Shinobi (1989); Shinobi III: Return of the Ninja Master (1993)
Shinobi: Art of Vengeance (2025)	Shadow Dancer (1989)
Jydge (2017)	Neon Chrome (2016)
Conflict: Vietnam (2004)	Conflict: Desert Storm (2002); Conflict: Desert Storm II (2003); Conflict: Global Terror (2005); Conflict: Denied Ops (2008)
Metal Slug 1st Mission (1999); Metal Slug 2nd Mission (2000)	Metal Slug (1996); Metal Slug 2 (1998); Metal Slug 3 (2000)
Metal Slug 6 (2006)	Metal Slug 4 (2002); Metal Slug 5 (2003)
Metal Slug (2006)	Metal Slug Advance (2004); Metal Slug 7 (2008)
Zoopunk (2027)	F.I.S.T.: Forged In Shadow Torch (2021)
My Singing Monsters: Dawn of Fire (2015)	My Singing Monsters (2012)

== Mangas ==
Prequel	Original
Fist of the Blue Sky (2001–current)	Fist of the North Star (1983–1988)
Dragon Ball Z: Bardock – The Father of Goku (1990); Jaco the Galactic Patrolman (2013)	Dragon Ball (1984–1995 manga series); Dragon Ball (1986–1989 anime)
Dragon Ball Super (2015–2018); Dragon Ball Super: Broly (2018)	Dragon Ball GT (1996–1997)
Dragon Ball Daima (2024-2025)	Dragon Ball Super (2015-2018); Dragon Ball Z: Battle of Gods (2013)
Go Nagai's Demon Knight (2007)	Devilman (1972)
Rozen Maiden: Ouvertüre (2006)	Rozen Maiden (2004); Rozen Maiden: Träumend (2005–2006)
Hellsing: The Dawn (2001–current)	Hellsing (1997–current)
Good luck, Nakamura-kun!! (2026) - Retro Anime 1980s	Modern Anime 2010s 2020s
Saint Seiya Episode.G (2002–current)	Saint Seiya (1986–1991)
Saint Seiya: Next Dimension (2006–current); Saint Seiya: The Lost Canvas (2006–2011)	Saint Seiya Episode.G (2002–current); Saint Seiya (1986–1991)
Ga-Rei Zero (2008 anime series)	Ga-Rei (2005–2010 manga series)
Lupin III: The Woman Called Fujiko Mine (2012 anime series)	Lupin III (1967 manga series)
2112: The Birth of Doraemon (1995)	Doraemon (1969–1996 manga series)
Perman: The Birdman has Arrived! (1983)	Perman (1967 manga series)
Pokémon Journeys episode 1: Enter Pikachu! (2019)	Pokémon (1997–current)
Fairy Tail Zero (2016)	Fairy Tail (2006–2017)
Ginga Densetsu Riki (2002 manga series)	Ginga Nagareboshi Gin (1983–1987)
One Piece: Strong World Episode 0 (2009 anime)	One Piece (1997–current)
Tenchi Muyo! In Love (1996)	Tenchi Universe (1995)
Tenchi Muyo! Ryo Ohki OVA 3 (2003)	Tenchi Muyo! GXP (2002)
Hakaba Kitaro (2008)	GeGeGe no Kitaro (1968-1969)
Fire Force (2015-2022)	Soul Eater (2004-2013)

== Cross-media ==
Prequel	Original
30 Days of Night: Blood Trails (2007 web series); 30 Days of Night: Dust to Dust (2008 web series)	30 Days of Night (2007 film); 30 Days of Night: Dark Days (2010 film)
Alien: Earth (2025–present; TV series)	Alien (1979 film)
Alien: Isolation (2014 video game); Alien: Isolation – The Digital Series (2019 animated web series); Alien: Blackout (2019 video game); Alien: Isolation 2 (TBA video game)	Aliens (1986 film)
Charlie's Angels: Animated Adventures (2003 animated web series)	Charlie's Angels: Full Throttle (2003 film)
Crystal Lake (2026 TV series)	Friday the 13th (1980 film)
Darkness Falls: The Tragic Life of Matilda Dixon (2003 comic)	Darkness Falls (2003 film)
Fast & Furious: Showdown (2013 video game)	Fast & Furious 6 (2013 film)
Fast & Furious Crossroads (2020 video game)	F9 (2021 film)
Paranormal Activity: The Jacob Degloshi Tapes (2012 web series)	Paranormal Activity: The Ghost Dimension (2015 film)
The Lost Symbol (2021 TV series)	The Da Vinci Code (2006 film)
Grease: Rise of the Pink Ladies (2023 TV series)	Grease (1978 film)
The Nightcomers (1971 film)	The Turn of the Screw (1898 novel)
Thunderbirds (2004 film)	Thunderbirds (1965–1966 TV series)
Star Trek (2009 film)	Star Trek (1966–1969 TV series)
Jungle Cubs (1996–1998 TV series)	The Jungle Book (1967 film)
The Little Mermaid (1992 TV series)	The Little Mermaid (1989 film)
The Warriors (2005 video game)	The Warriors (1979 film)
The Young Indiana Jones Chronicles (1992–1996 TV series); Indiana Jones and the Emperor's Tomb (2003 video game); Indiana Jones and the Temple of Doom (1984 film)	Raiders of the Lost Ark (1981 film)
Indiana Jones and the Great Circle (2024 video game)	Indiana Jones and the Last Crusade (1989 film)
Indiana Jones and the Staff of Kings (2009 video game); Indiana Jones and the Fate of Atlantis (1992 video game); Indiana Jones and the Infernal Machine (1999 video game)	Indiana Jones and the Kingdom of the Crystal Skull (2008 film); Indiana Jones and the Dial of Destiny (2023 film)
Gremlins: Secrets of the Mogwai (2022 TV series)	Gremlins (1984 film); Gremlins 2: The New Batch (1990 film)
The Dark Tower: The Gunslinger Born (2007 comic); The Dark Tower: The Long Road Home (2008 comic); The Dark Tower: Treachery (2008–2009 comic); The Dark Tower: The Sorcerer (2009 comic); The Dark Tower: The Fall of Gilead (2009 comic); The Dark Tower: Battle of Jericho Hill (2009–2010 comic); The Little Sisters of Eluria (1998 comic)	The Dark Tower (1982–2004 novels)
Star Trek Generations (1994) (prologue)	Star Trek: The Next Generation (1987–1994 TV series)
Twin Peaks: Fire Walk with Me (1992 film)	Twin Peaks (1990–1991 TV series)
The Many Saints of Newark (2021 film)	The Sopranos (1999–2007 TV series)
Wing Commander (1999 film)	Wing Commander (1991 video game)
The Nightmare Before Christmas: The Pumpkin King (2005 video game)	The Nightmare Before Christmas (1993 film); The Nightmare Before Christmas: Oogie's Revenge (2004 video game)
The Powerpuff Girls Movie (2002 film)	The Powerpuff Girls (1998–2009 TV series)
Totally Spies! The Movie (2009 film)	Totally Spies! (2001–present TV series)
Lizzie McGuire: Magic Train (2004 TV episode - Season 2)	The Lizzie McGuire Movie (2003 film)
Rugrats: The Family Tree (1998 TV special episode - Season 5)	The Rugrats Movie (1998 film)
Rugrats: Acorn Nuts and Diapey Butts (2000 TV special episode - Season 6)	Rugrats in Paris: The Movie (2000 film)
The Chronicles of Riddick: Escape from Butcher Bay (2004 video game); The Chronicles of Riddick: Assault on Dark Athena (2009 video game)	Pitch Black (2000 film)
Monsters University (2013 film); Monsters, Inc. Scream Team (2001 video game)	Monsters, Inc. (2001 film)
Halo: The Fall of Reach (2001 novel)	Halo: Combat Evolved (2001 video game)
Dragon of Doom (1994 TV film) (flashback); Island of Assassins (1997 TV film) (flashback); Lupin the Third: The Woman Called Fujiko Mine (2012); Jigen's Gravestone (2014 film); The Mystery of Mamo (1978 film); Lupin the Third: The Castle of Cagliostro (1979 film); Lupin III: The First (2019 film)	Lupin the Third Part I (1971–1972); Goemon's Blood Spray (2017 film); Fujiko's Lie (2019 film)
The Scorpion King 2: Rise of a Warrior (2008 film); The Scorpion King: Rise of the Akkadian (2002 video game); The Scorpion King (2002 film); The Scorpion King: Sword of Osiris (2002, video game); The Scorpion King 3: Battle for Redemption (2012 film); The Scorpion King 4: Quest for Power (2015 film); The Scorpion King: Book of Souls (2018 film)	The Mummy Returns (2001 film)
Serenity: Better Days (comic book 2008)	Serenity (2005 film)
Spider-Noir (2026 TV series); Madame Web (2024 film)	Venom (2018 film); Venom: Let There Be Carnage (2021 film); Morbius (2022 film); Venom: The Last Dance (2024 film); Kraven the Hunter (2024 film)
Stargate Origins (2018 web series)	Stargate (1994 film)
The Acolyte (2024 TV Show); Tales of the Jedi (2022 web series)	Star Wars: Episode I – The Phantom Menace (1999 film)
Star Wars: The Clone Wars (2008 film); Star Wars: The Clone Wars (2008 TV show)	Star Wars: Episode III – Revenge of the Sith (2005 film)
Star Wars: The Bad Batch (2021 TV Show); Tales of the Empire (2024 web series); Star Wars: Maul – Shadow Lord (2026 TV Show); Star Wars Jedi: Fallen Order (2019 video game); Star Wars: A New Dawn (2014 novel); Obi-Wan Kenobi (2022 TV Show); Solo: A Star Wars Story (2018 film); Star Wars Rebels (2014 TV show); Andor (2022 TV Show); Rogue One: A Star Wars Story (2016 film)	Star Wars Episode IV: A New Hope (1977 film)
The Mandalorian (2019 web series); The Book of Boba Fett (2021 web series); Ahsoka (2023 web series); The Mandalorian and Grogu (2026 film); Star Wars Resistance (2018 TV show)	Star Wars: The Force Awakens (2015 film)
Furiosa: A Mad Max Saga (2024 film); Mad Max: Fury Road (2015 comic book)	Mad Max: Fury Road (2015 film)
Scream: If I Die (2016 web series)	Scream (2015–2019 TV series)
Land of the Dead: Road to Fiddler's Green (2005 video game)	Land of the Dead (2005 film)
The Hills Have Eyes: The Beginning (2007 comic)	The Hills Have Eyes (2006 film)
Year of the Black Rainbow (2010 album – novel)	The Second Stage Turbine Blade (2002 music album – comic book) In Keeping Secrets of Silent Earth: 3 (2003 music album); Good Apollo, I'm Burning Star IV, Volume One: From Fear Through the Eyes of Madness (2005 music album – graphic novel); Good Apollo, I'm Burning Star IV, Volume Two: No World for Tomorrow (2007 music album)
Terminator Salvation: The Machinima Series (2009 animated web series); Terminator Salvation (2009 video game)	Terminator Salvation (2009 film)
Transformers: Tales of the Fallen (2009–2010 comic book); Transformers: Defiance (2009 comic book); Transformers: Foundation (2011 comic book); Transformers: Movie Prequel (2007 comic book); Transformers: Saga of the Allspark (2008 comic book); Transformers: The Reign of Starscream (2008 comic book); Transformers: Sector 7 (2010–2011 comic book); Transformers: Convergence (2011 prose story); Transformers: Ghosts of Yesterday (2007 novel); Transformers: Movie Prequel Special (2008 comic book)	Transformers (2007 film)
Transformers One (2024 film)	Transformers (1984-present)
Transformers: Saga of the Allspark (2008 comic book); Transformers: The Reign of Starscream (2008 comic book); Transformers: Alliance (2008–2009 comic book); Transformers: Tales of the Fallen (2009–2010 comic book); Transformers: The Veiled Threat (2009 novel); Transformers: Convergence (2011 prose story)	Transformers: Revenge of the Fallen (2009 film)
Treadstone (2019 TV series)	The Bourne Identity (2002 film)
Dead Space: Martyr (2010 novel); Dead Space: Catalyst (2012 novel)	Dead Space (series) (2008)
Dead Space: Downfall (2008 animated film); Dead Space (2008 comics); Dead Space: Extraction (2009 video game)	Dead Space (2008 video game)
Hulk Vs. Wolverine (2009 video)	Wolverine and the X-Men (2009 TV series)
The Lord of the Rings: The War of the Rohirrim (2024, animated film)	The Lord of the Rings: The Fellowship of the Ring (2001 film)
Jake and the Neverland Pirates (2011–2016 TV series)	Peter Pan (1953 film)
James Cameron's Avatar: The Game (2009 video game)	Avatar (2009 film)
Transformers: Dark of the Moon (2011 video game); Transformers: Convergence (2011 prose story); Transformers: Foundation (2011 comic book); Transformers: Sector 7 (2010–2011 comic book)	Transformers: Dark of the Moon (2011 film)
Resident Evil: Degeneration (2008 film)	Resident Evil 5 (2009 video game)
Red Faction: Origins (2011 film)	Red Faction: Guerrilla (2009 video game)
The Walking Dead: Torn Apart (2011 web series); The Walking Dead: Cold Storage (2012 web series); The Walking Dead: Survival Instinct (2013 video game)	The Walking Dead (2010–2022 TV series)
Tron: Uprising (2012 TV series); Tron: Evolution (2010 video game)	Tron: Legacy (2010 film)
Batman: Arkham City (2011 comic)	Batman: Arkham City (2011 video game)
Dead Space: Aftermath (2011 animated film)	Dead Space 2 (2011 video game)
The Fog (2005 comic)	The Fog (2005 film)
Disney's Stitch: Experiment 626 (2002 video game)	Lilo & Stitch (2002 film)
Mass Effect: Revelation (2007 novel)	Mass Effect (2007 video game)
Mass Effect: Redemption (2010 comic); Mass Effect: Incursion (2010 comic); Mass Effect: Evolution (2011 comic); Mass Effect: Ascension (2008 novel); Mass Effect Galaxy (2009 video game)	Mass Effect 2 (2010 video game)
Mass Effect: Homeworlds (2012 comic); Mass Effect: Retribution (2010 novel); Mass Effect: Deception (2012 novel); Mass Effect: Inquisition (2010 comic); Mass Effect Infiltrator (2012 video game); Mass Effect: Invasion (2012 comic); Mass Effect: Conviction (2011 comic); Mass Effect: Paragon Lost (2013 anime)	Mass Effect 3 (2012 video game)
Meet the Robinsons (2007 video game)	Meet the Robinsons (2007 animated film)
Lion of Oz (2000 animated film); Oz the Great and Powerful (2013 film)	The Wonderful Wizard of Oz (1900 novel)
The Chronicles of Riddick: Dark Fury (2004 animated film)	The Chronicles of Riddick (2004 film)
Modern Warfare 2: Ghost (2009 comics)	Call of Duty: Modern Warfare 2 (2009 video game)
Back to the Future (2010 video game)	Back to the Future (1991–1992 TV series)
Pan (2015 film); Neverland (2011 miniseries)	The Little White Bird (1902 novel)
Top Cat Begins (2015 animated film)	Top Cat (1961–1962 animated TV series); Top Cat: The Movie (2011 animated film)
Slayers: The Motion Picture (1995 animated film)	Slayers (1989 novel)
All Hail King Julien (2014–2017 web television series); Madagascar: A Little Wild (2020 streaming show)	Madagascar (2005 film)
Muppet Babies (1984–1991) or Muppet Babies (2018–2022)	The Muppet Show (1976–1981)
Sesame Beginnings (2006–2007 video)	Sesame Street (1969–current)
Cloudy with a Chance of Meatballs (2017–2018 TV series)	Cloudy with a Chance of Meatballs (2009 film)
Ultraman Cosmos: The First Contact (2001)	Ultraman Cosmos (2001–2002)
Underworld: Endless War (2011 animated film)	Underworld: Awakening (2012 film)
The Vampire Diaries: A Darker Truth (2009 web series)	The Vampire Diaries (2009–2017 TV series)
Lost Boys: Reign of Frogs (2008 comic book)	Lost Boys: The Tribe (2008 film)
Assassin's Creed: Lineage (2009 short films)	Assassin's Creed II (2009 video game)
Legends of the Dark Crystal (2007–2010, manga); Jim Henson's The Dark Crystal: Creation Myths (2011–2015, comics); The Dark Crystal: Age of Resistance (2019 Netflix TV series)	The Dark Crystal (1982 film)
Gotham (2014–2019 TV series); Pennyworth (2019 TV series – present)	Batman (1940 comic book – present)
Krypton (2018–2019 TV series)	Superman (1938 comic book – present)
Spirit Untamed (2021)	Spirit Riding Free (2017 TV series)
Labyrinth: Coronation (2019 comic)	Labyrinth (1986 film)
Maya the Bee Movie (2014 film)	Maya the Bee (2012–2017 TV series)
The Lion Guard (2016-2019 TV series)	The Lion King II: Simba's Pride (1998 film)
Thomas & Friends: The Adventure Begins (2015 film)	Thomas & Friends (1984–2021 TV series)
Tangled: Before Ever After (2017 TV film); Rapunzel's Tangled Adventure (2017–2020 TV series)	Tangled Ever After (2012 short film)
Teenage Mutant Ninja Turtles: Lone Rat and Cubs (2017 TV episode)	Teenage Mutant Ninja Turtles: Rise of the Turtles (2012 TV episode)
Miraculous: Tales of Ladybug & Cat Noir, The Movie (2023 Netflix film)	Miraculous: Tales of Ladybug & Cat Noir (2015-present TV series)
The Wolf Among Us (2013-14 video game)	Fables (2002- comics series)
Last Order: Final Fantasy VII (2005 animated film)	Final Fantasy VII (1997 video game)
RoboCop: Rogue City (2023 video game)	RoboCop 3 (1993 film)
Mission: Impossible – Operation Surma (2003 video game)	Mission: Impossible III (2006 film)
Blade Runner Black Out 2022 (2017 short animated film); Blade Runner: Black Lotus (2021 miniseries); Blade Runner 2033: Labyrinth (video game); 2036: Nexus Dawn (2017 short film); 2048: Nowhere to Run (2017 short film)	Blade Runner 2049 (2017 film)
The Loud House Movie (2021 Netflix film)	The Loud House: Schooled! (2020 TV episode)
The Many Saints of Newark (2021 film)	The Sopranos (1999 TV series)
No Time to Spy: A Loud House Movie (2024 TV film)	The Loud House: Waking History / Pranks Fore Nothing (2023 TV episodes)
A Loud House Christmas Movie: Naughty or Nice (2025 TV film)	The Loud House: Crystal Ballin' / The Most Dangerous Gamer (2025 TV episodes)
It - Welcome to Derry (2025 TV series)	It (2017 film); It Chapter Two (2019 film)
