= Dead to Rights (disambiguation) =

Dead to Rights is a video game series.

Dead to Rights may also refer to:

- Dead to Rights (video game), a 2002 video game, first game in the Dead to Rights video game series
  - Dead to Rights (GBA video game), a 2004 video game, a version of the 2002 game, part of the Dead to Rights video game series
- Batman: Dead to Rights, a DC Comics comic book, an omnibus collection volume of Batman Confidential
- "Dead to Rights" (Arrow), a 2013 episode from season 1 of the TV show Arrow
- "Dead to Rights" (Burn Notice), a 2011 episode from season 1 of the TV show Burn Notice
- Dead to Rights (film), a 2025 Chinese film about the Nanjing Massacre (the Rape of Nanking)
- Dead to Rights (album), a 2026 album by Metal Church
- Dead to rights, an idiom meaning to already have enough evidence to prove that one is guilty of a crime or other misdeed
