= Gotham Games =

American video game publisher

Gotham Games, Inc.
- Type: Subsidiary
- Industry: Video games
- Founded: July 22, 2002; 23 years ago
- Founder: Jamie Leece
- Defunct: December 18, 2003; 22 years ago
- Fate: Dissolved, operations folded into Gathering of Developers and Global Star Software
- Headquarters: New York City, US
- Key people: Jamie Leece (president)
- Parent: Take-Two Interactive

Gotham Games, Inc. was an American video game publisher based in New York City. Founded in July 2002 and headed by Jamie Leece, the company was shut down in December 2003.

== History ==
Gotham Games was launched as a publishing label and subsidiary of Take-Two Interactive on July 22, 2002, with Take-Two Interactive's vice-president of publishing and business development, Jamie Leece, promoted to Gotham Games' president. At the time, Gotham Games was the third label for Take-Two Interactive, after Rockstar Games and Gathering of Developers, because of which Take-Two Interactive ceased publishing under their self-named label, citing a "global branding strategy".

Its titles were aimed for all ages at a budget price point, including AAA games, contrasting to the Rockstar Games label. In 2003, the company expanded to the children's market, by publishing its video game Piglet's Big Game.

At the May 2003 Electronic Entertainment Expo, Gotham Games announced that they were seeking new video game developers who were willing to have their game published by them. In early late 2003, Take-Two and NewKidCo entered into a partnership, leveraging by their distribution relationship with Jack of All Games, where Take-Two could co-publish NewKidCo games with Gotham Games, and Dora the Explorer: Super Spies was one of the titles came out of a co-publishing deal.

On December 18, 2003, Take-Two Interactive's chief executive officer, Jeffrey Lapin, announced that Gotham Games had been dissolved as part of a "larger internal reorganization". As part of the plan, its titles slated for release by Gotham, including Mafia, were absorbed into Gathering of Developers, which was expanding beyond PC into AAA console games, and Global Star Software, which had briefly becoming an AAA game publisher, before the arrival of 2K in 2005.

== Games published ==
Title	Platform(s)	Release date	Developer	Ref.
Austin Powers Pinball	PlayStation	September 10, 2002	Wildfire Studios	
Conflict: Desert Storm	Microsoft Windows	September 30, 2002	Pivotal Games	
Conflict: Desert Storm	PlayStation 2	September 30, 2002	Pivotal Games	
Conflict: Desert Storm	Xbox	September 30, 2002	Pivotal Games	
Spec Ops: Airborne Commando	PlayStation	October 31, 2002	Big Grub	
Serious Sam	Xbox	November 12, 2002	Croteam	
Disney's Piglet's Big Game	GameCube	March 18, 2003	Doki Denki	
Disney's Piglet's Big Game	PlayStation 2	March 18, 2003	Doki Denki	
Big Strike Bowling	PlayStation	March 19, 2003	Coresoft	
Patriotic Pinball	PlayStation	April 17, 2003	Wildfire Studios	
Conflict: Desert Storm	GameCube	April 22, 2003	Pivotal Games	
Motocross Mania 2	PlayStation	June 25, 2003	Alpine Studios	
The Great Escape	PlayStation 2	July 22, 2003	Pivotal Games	
The Great Escape	Xbox	July 22, 2003	Pivotal Games	
The Great Escape	Microsoft Windows	July 23, 2003	Pivotal Games	
ATV Mania	PlayStation	July 23, 2003	Deibus Studios	
Starsky & Hutch	PlayStation 2	September 9, 2003	Minds Eye Productions	
Starsky & Hutch	Xbox	September 10, 2003	Minds Eye Productions	
Starsky & Hutch	Microsoft Windows	September 11, 2003	Minds Eye Productions	
Ford Truck Mania	PlayStation	September 16, 2003	Alpine Studios	
Conflict: Desert Storm II – Back to Baghdad	Microsoft Windows	October 7, 2003	Pivotal Games	
Conflict: Desert Storm II – Back to Baghdad	PlayStation 2	October 7, 2003	Pivotal Games	
Conflict: Desert Storm II – Back to Baghdad	Xbox	October 7, 2003	Pivotal Games	
Conflict: Desert Storm II – Back to Baghdad	GameCube	January 6, 2004	Pivotal Games	
MTV's Celebrity Deathmatch	PlayStation 2	October 14, 2003	Big Ape Productions	
MTV's Celebrity Deathmatch	Xbox	October 14, 2003	Big Ape Productions	
MTV's Celebrity Deathmatch	PlayStation	October 15, 2003	Coresoft	
MTV's Celebrity Deathmatch	Microsoft Windows	October 19, 2003	Big Ape Productions	
Dora the Explorer: Super Spies	Game Boy Advance	October 25, 2003	CinéGroupe	
Ford Racing 2	Xbox	December 11, 2003	Razorworks	
Ford Racing 2	PlayStation 2	December 18, 2003	Razorworks	
