= Prequel =

Fictional work whose story precedes that of a previous work

A prequel is a literary, dramatic or cinematic work whose story precedes that of a previous work, by focusing on events that occur before the original narrative. A prequel is a work that forms part of a backstory to the preceding work.

The term "prequel" is a 20th-century neologism from the prefix "pre-" (from Latin prae, "before") and "sequel".

Like sequels, prequels may or may not concern the same plot as the work from which they are derived. More often they explain the background that led to the events in the original, but sometimes the connections are not completely explicit. Sometimes prequels play on the audience's knowledge of what will happen next, using deliberate references to create dramatic irony.

== History ==
Though the word "prequel" is of recent origin, works fitting this concept existed long before. The Cypria, presupposing hearers' acquaintance with the events of the Homeric epic, confined itself to what preceded the Iliad, and thus formed a kind of introduction.

According to the Oxford English Dictionary, as well as the Merriam-Webster.com Dictionary, the word "prequel" first appeared in print in 1922, in Publishers' Weekly. It was subsequently used in 1958 in an article by Anthony Boucher in The Magazine of Fantasy & Science Fiction, used to describe James Blish's 1956 story They Shall Have Stars, which expanded on the story introduced in his earlier 1955 work, Earthman Come Home. However, Christopher Tolkien, writing about the history of The Silmarillion in 1977, claims that his father, J. R. R. Tolkien, "coined the highly uncharacteristic word 'prequel'" when badgered for a definition of the relationship between The Lord of the Rings and The Silmarillion sometime after 1955.

The term came into general usage in the 1970s and 1980s.

Butch and Sundance: The Early Days (1979) may have introduced the term "prequel" into the mainstream.

An example of a prequel is C. S. Lewis's 1955 children's book, The Magician's Nephew, that explained the creation of Narnia—the subject of Lewis's seven-book series The Chronicles of Narnia—which began with The Lion, the Witch and the Wardrobe (1950).

The Adventures of Ben Gunn, a 1956 novel by R. F. Delderfield, was written as a prequel to the novel Treasure Island.

== Usage ==
Rather than being a concept distinct from that of a sequel, a prequel still adheres to the general principle of serialization, defined only by its internal chronology and publication order. For example, Star Wars: Episode I – The Phantom Menace (1999) is a prequel to the Star Wars original trilogy (1977–1983), but is only a predecessor of Star Wars: Episode II – Attack of the Clones (2002) because of the release order. Likewise, 1984's Indiana Jones and the Temple of Doom is a prequel to 1981's Raiders of the Lost Ark, in that it is set in 1935, one year before the first film. In some cases, such as this one, there is little impact by the relative placement over overarching plotlines. When an entire continuity is started over again, a so-called reboot, such as in the case of Casino Royale or Batman Begins, it is typically not thought of as a prequel, although it is set earlier in the common chronology of the characters and may give away plot points common to both timelines.

=== Complications ===
Sometimes "prequel" describes follow-ups where it is not always possible to apply a label defined solely in terms of intertextuality. In the case of The Godfather Part II, the narrative combines elements of a prequel with those of a more generalized sequel by having two intercut narrative strands, one continuing from the first film (the mafia family story under the leadership of Michael Corleone), and one, completely separate, detailing events that precede it (the story of his father Vito Corleone in his youth, included). In this sense the film can be regarded as both a "prequel and a sequel" (i.e., both a prior and a continuing story), and is often referred to in this manner. Mufasa: The Lion King begins after the events of the 2019 remake of the original film, where Rafiki tells the story of Mufasa to his granddaughter Kiara. The film then flashes back and spends most of its runtime chronicling that story, with some scenes in the present day included in between to add commentary, as well as at the end of the film.

Time-travel often results in a work being considered both a prequel and a sequel, or both a prequel and a "soft" reboot, depending on how drastically history is altered. Examples of arguable soft-reboot prequels include Star Trek, and The Flash, the latter of which completely erases the events of the DC Extended Universe film series to make way for the reboot series. Time-travel sequel-prequels can be found in the original Planet of the Apes series. Even though the latter three films depict world events chronologically prior to those of the first two films, the narrative itself is continuous for the main characters, as three apes from the first two films go back in time. The later installment Escape from the Planet of the Apes served as both a sequel and prequel to the first film. X-Men: Days of Future Past begins in the dystopian future following the X-Men original trilogy, where Wolverine's conscience is sent back in time to 1973, before the events of the trilogy and after the events of the prequel film X-Men: First Class, to prevent the future from happening. The film alternates between the two timelines, functioning as both a sequel-prequel to the original trilogy and a sequel to First Class.Transformers: Beast Wars is an example of a TV series that uses time-travel to serve as both a sequel and prequel to another series (in this case, the original Transformers cartoon).

The term "prequel" has also been applied, sometimes incorrectly, to origin-story reboots, such as Rise of the Planet of the Apes, Batman Begins, and Casino Royale. The creators of both Batman Begins and Rise of the Planet of the Apes also stated their intent to dispense with the continuity of the previous films so they would exist as separate pieces of work, with Christopher Nolan—director of Batman Begins—explicitly stating he does not consider it a prequel. Here, "prequel" denotes status as a "franchise-renewing original" that depicts events earlier in the (internally inconsistent) narrative cycle than those of a previous installment. Most reviewers require that a prequel must lead up to the beginning of its original work, which is inconsistent with works that dispense with the narrative of previous work and are not significantly within the same continuity. At times, the term has been used to refer to a work that was released, as well as chronologically set, before any other work. However, that usage conflicts with the fact that a prequel is a type of sequel.

== See also ==
- Backstory
- List of prequels
- Sequel
- Spin-off
- Origin story
