= Dead to Rights II =

2005 video game

- PAL cover art featuring Jack Slate (top) and his pet and K-9 Shadow (bottom).
- Developers: Widescreen Games; Namco (PC)
- Publishers: NA: Namco Hometek; EU: Electronic Arts
- Series: Dead to Rights
- Engine: RenderWare
- Platforms: PlayStation 2 Xbox; Windows
- Release: PlayStation 2 & Xbox: NA: April 12, 2005; EU: October 28, 2005; Windows: NA: August 15, 2005; EU: 2005
- Genre: third-person shooter
- Mode: Single-player

Dead to Rights II is a third-person shooter video game developed by Widescreen Games and published by Namco Hometek. It is a prequel to Dead to Rights. A prequel to Dead to Rights II for the PlayStation Portable, titled Dead to Rights: Reckoning, was released in June 2005.

== Gameplay ==
Dead to Rights II is primarily a third person action game with a focus on shooting and fist fighting. Levels were designed for the player to be able to run and gun while providing the option to take cover and play more tactfully. The game uses an action camera which allows the player to target the nearest enemy without having to aim and would switch targets to the next enemy upon defeating the first. The targeting system is color coded to show how accurate and damaging a shot will be, red reflecting poor accuracy and damage and green indicating high accuracy and maximum damage.

The player can initiate a dive maneuver, where time slows down and the player can still shoot multiple targets, while consuming energy. Energy is a resource which replenishes after defeating an enemy, over time or disarming and enemy. It is used to dive, take human shields and get the players' canine companion to take enemies down and retrieve their weapons. The player has a wide variety of guns to choose from. While the player can not reload their weapon, when the gun is out of ammunition the player will drop that weapon and use one of the many other ones available.

There are explosives which can be shot to damage targets as well as grenades and explosive canisters the player can use to defeat enemies. The player can also vault over obstacles in the environment and use them for cover. The fist fighting segments take a back role to the shooting, but the player can perform melee kills and take downs and has a wide range of melee weapons to choose from.

== Plot ==
A reputable judge Alfred McGuffin uncovers a citywide crime syndicate, and is kidnapped. The judge was a friend of Jack's father, so the cop is obligated to send a few hundred men to their graves in order to make things right. Before long, all hell breaks loose, so Jack and his K-9 cohort Shadow must take on a powerful mob in the fight of their lives to break the city's spiral of betrayal and corruption. In the end, the judge is murdered and although Jack gets the killer, goons of a high-ranking Russian crime lord named Blanchov get the judge's files. Jack's girlfriend Ruby is murdered by Blanchov and although Jack never retrieves the files (they were likely Hennesey's files from the first game), he goes after Blanchov for revenge. Jack kills Blanchov, but gets no satisfaction out of it knowing that Blanchov is just a highly placed puppet that can easily be replaced. Having lost Ruby, Jack has nothing to really live for anymore. Also he claims that who has him Dead to Rights as they got the files and he ended up with nothing.

== Reception ==
Reception

Aggregate score
Aggregator	Score	
Aggregator	PS2	Xbox
Metacritic	51/100	54/100

Review scores
Publication	Score	
Publication	PS2	Xbox
Edge	N/A	3/10
Electronic Gaming Monthly	4.83/10	4.83/10
Eurogamer	6/10	N/A
Game Informer	5/10	5/10
GamePro	3/5	3/5
GameRevolution	D	D
GameSpot	6.8/10	6.8/10
GameSpy	2/5	2/5
GameZone	6/10	6/10
IGN	6.8/10	6.8/10
Official U.S. PlayStation Magazine	2/5	N/A
Official Xbox Magazine (US)	N/A	6.3/10

The PlayStation 2 and Xbox versions received "mixed" reviews according to video game review aggregator Metacritic.
