= Conflict: Global Terror =

2005 video game

- Developer: Pivotal Games
- Publishers: PAL: SCi Games (Note: Even though the Eidos logo appears on the packaging and before the intro of the game, the game is copyrighted and published to SCi as it was finished before they bought out Eidos Interactive.); NA: 2K; WW: Synergenix (Mobile)
- Series: Conflict
- Platforms: Windows, PlayStation 2, Xbox
- Release: PAL: September 30, 2005; NA: October 6, 2005; AU: October 7, 2005 (PC)
- Genre: Tactical shooter
- Modes: Single-player, multiplayer

Conflict: Global Terror (called Conflict: Global Storm in Europe) is a tactical shooter video game developed by Pivotal Games and Synergenix, and published by SCi Games and 2K for PlayStation 2, Xbox and Microsoft Windows. It is the fourth installment in the Conflict series.

The action focuses on an elite rapid response special forces unit, using the four original members of the Desert Storm series and a new member. Bradley, Foley, Connors, Jones and Sherman must overcome terrorists over many different countries, including Colombia, South Korea, Ukraine, Egypt, the Philippines and Kashmir.

== Gameplay ==
The game plays primarily in third-person perspective with controls similar to a standard first-person shooter. The player directly controls one member of the team at a time, but can issue commands to teammates and also swap direct control between any of the four characters on the fly. Such a control mechanism is designed to allow tactical play to emerge, with many players preferring a "slow and steady" approach, unlike many contemporary first- and third-person shooters. The AI in the game will advance, use cover, use grenades and retreat when injured.

== Plot ==
The game starts with Red Team performing a HALO insertion into the Colombian jungle where they are captured and taken to a nearby town controlled by militia forces. Connors escapes and subsequently frees the rest of Red Team, whom then continue with their mission to destroy the drug factory. After completing the mission and capturing Mandel, Red Team head to the landing zone, however Foley stays behind to defend the rest of the team. He does not make it to the landing zone before Bradley decides to pull out and is captured by the militia. He reappears in Conflict: Denied Ops as a prisoner.

The team is given a replacement sniper, Carrie Sherman. They are then sent on a mission to protect senator Jack Maguire on his diplomatic mission to South Korea, then to Ukraine to secure a pesticide plant where sarin gas is being manufactured, then to Chechnya to capture some sarin gas tanks from Chechen rebels and help Orlov, a Russian agent, to take the tanks to the Russian lines, and then Egypt to a terrorist camp to disable all anti aircraft systems and laser designate the command bunker for an air strike, before the identity of the traitor who betrayed Red Team in the first mission is revealed.

The traitor is revealed to be Strachen. Red Team are then sent to the Philippines to meet up with Connors' brother Alan and locate Strachen. Red Team set up a safehouse near Hotel Mantki where Strachen is present as the information given by Alan Connors. The team are attacked by terrorists and escape, but fail to apprehend Strachen before retracting. Strachen is later tracked down to an estate where he has taken 4 hostages and is hiding with an army of highly-trained mercenaries led by Hans Klerbler. Red Team eliminates Klerbler in revenge for the brutal murder of Alan Connors. Strachen is captured and reveals Mandel to be in Kashmir.

The final mission is set in Kashmir, where Mandel plans to launch nuclear missile at Pakistan to trigger a war between them and India. Red Team disarms the missiles and Mandel is killed when his Mi-24 Hind is shot down by Red Team. The game ends with Red Team deciding to return to Colombia to find Foley. After agreeing with the idea, the game ends with a cut-scene of Red Team leaving in a helicopter.

== Reception ==
Reception

Aggregate score
| Aggregator | Score | | |
| Aggregator | PC | PS2 | Xbox |
|---|---|---|---|
| Metacritic | 61/100 | 62/100 | 62/100 |

Review scores
| Publication | Score | | |
| Publication | PC | PS2 | Xbox |
|---|---|---|---|
| Edge | N/A | N/A | 7/10 |
| Eurogamer | N/A | N/A | 6/10 |
| Game Informer | N/A | 6.75/10 | 6.75/10 |
| GamePro | N/A | 3/5 | 3/5 |
| GameSpot | 6.2/10 | 6.2/10 | 6.1/10 |
| GameSpy | 3/5 | 1.5/5 | 1.5/5 |
| GameZone | N/A | N/A | 6.2/10 |
| IGN | 6/10 | 6/10 | 6/10 |
| Official U.S. PlayStation Magazine | N/A | 3/5 | N/A |
| Official Xbox Magazine (US) | N/A | N/A | 7.4/10 |
| PC Gamer (US) | 49% | N/A | N/A |
| The Sydney Morning Herald | 3/5 | 3/5 | 3/5 |

The game received "mixed" reviews on all platforms according to the review aggregation website Metacritic.

== Sequel ==
The next game in the Conflict series, Conflict: Denied Ops, was released in 2008. The only character who returned was Paul Foley.
