= Dead to Rights (video game) =

2002 video game

- European PlayStation 2 cover art featuring the main protagonist, Jack Slate
- Developer: Namco Hometek
- Publishers: NA: Namco Hometek; EU: Electronic Arts; JP: Namco; NA/EU: Light & Shadow Production (PC)
- Director: Andre Emerson
- Producer: Andre Emerson
- Writers: Flint Dille; Andre Emerson; Mike Kennedy
- Composers: Kevin Manthei; Kevin Riepl
- Series: Dead to Rights
- Platforms: Xbox, PlayStation 2, GameCube, Windows
- Release: August 20, 2002: Xbox; NA: August 20, 2002; JP: November 28, 2002; EU: February 21, 2003 PS2 & GameCube; NA: November 18, 2002 (PS2); NA: November 25, 2002 (GC); JP: August 7, 2004 (PS2); EU: August 22, 2003 Windows; NA: November 10, 2003; EU: November 14, 2003
- Genre: Third-person shooter
- Mode: Single-player

Dead to Rights is a third-person shooter video game developed and published by Namco Hometek. It was released in 2002 as a timed exclusive for the Xbox and released for the PlayStation 2 and GameCube thereafter. A year after its console debut, the game was released for Microsoft Windows. A separate game for the Game Boy Advance was released in 2004 to significantly worse reception. The story follows police officer Jack Slate who is framed for murder. Jack's police dog, Shadow, assists him during gameplay.

The game received mixed to positive reviews across all platforms. Dead to Rights was followed by three sequels: Dead to Rights II in 2005, Dead to Rights: Reckoning for the PSP, also in 2005, and Dead to Rights: Retribution on the PlayStation 3 and Xbox 360 in 2010.

== Gameplay ==
Dead to Rights makes use of bullet time (a mechanism used mostly in the Max Payne series), a popular gameplay mechanic of the time. The game advertises itself as drawing inspiration from Hong Kong action cinema, i.e. gun fu. The player is sometimes accompanied by Shadow, a canine partner who can attack enemies on command, and who will automatically kill whatever enemy he's aimed at and then bring the player whatever the enemy was carrying (to keep the dog from being too powerful, his attack can only be used when a meter for it fills up). In some puzzle sections, the player actually takes direct control of Shadow to reach areas that the human character cannot (although this only happens twice in the game).

== Plot ==
Jack Slate is a police officer partnered with his K-9 unit, Shadow. The two patrol Grant City, a metropolis seemingly populated with more criminals than honest citizens. One night, while on a routine patrol, Jack responds to a call at a construction zone, only to find his own father, Frank Slate, murdered. In pursuit of his father's killer (presumably Augie Blatz, a racket boss with a grudge against Frank), Jack is led through a labyrinth of crime and corruption. He is eventually framed for another murder by the corrupt police chief, Richard "Dick" Hennesey, in a bid to stop Jack before he undermines the status quo. After seven months in prison, Jack escapes from imprisonment by putting battery acid on the electric chair wires and hunts down Hennesey, clearing away the city's crime lords in the process. He first gets clothes at the apartment he was framed at and goes to Chinatown for information. There, he battles Fat Chow and his goons and interrogates Marvin Silt (a goon who tried to run him down outside the prison) before a woman named Eve Adams murders Silt. Eve is able to identify the assassin who was hired to frame Jack, and the two have to battle Fat Chow and his goons again, with Jack killing Fat Chow before they are able to escape. Afterwards, Jack visits his father's grave and meets Hildy, his father's former assistant; he learns from her that his father was investigating the city's corrupt mayor and police force for mayoral candidate Gloria Exner before his murder. Jack comes under attack by unknown attackers in clown masks, but he eventually escapes the cemetery and links up with Eve again to foil an assassination attempt on Exner at a public debate. The two foil the attempt, but Eve is murdered by Patch, the assassin who framed Jack. Jack chases down Patch and causes his limo to crash, but the crash kills Patch, preventing interrogation, although Jack takes his pager.

Jack then protects Exner from corrupt police officers attempting to murder her and learns a little more about what his father was investigating, but she never found out what he knew as he was murdered before he could tell her. After receiving a message on Patch's pager, Jack chases a man named Gofer around the docks hoping for answers, but he finds Gofer murdered and is injured. While Hildy helps him, mercenaries led by Rafshoon Diggs captured both Hildy and Jack, and Jack is taken to meet Fahook Ubduhl, a Middle Eastern crime lord who basically runs the Grant City underworld. With the help of Shadow, Jack escapes and finally learns what this is really about: Gold; the mayor was running a gold mining operation, and Jack's father stumbled on it. Jack returns to the prison, where he kills Diggs and confronts the mayor, who confirms all he's found out already and fills in the rest: The mayor was running a gold mining and smuggling operation with Fahook, as well as Hennessey, who had been blackmailing many key people and had his hands in the operation already. As he would lose money if the mayor was shut down, Hennessey murdered Frank to protect it.

The mayor and Jack ally to take down Hennessey, with Jack getting incriminating files from the police station in exchange for a pardon from the mayor. Jack gets the files (learning at the same time that the attackers in the cemetery were corrupt police officers in disguise), but he decides to give them to Exner instead, only for Exner to betray him and take the files to give to the mayor out of fear. However, Exner is murdered by Hildy, who is now working for Fahook. She takes the files, but she doesn't harm Jack, who follows her to an abandoned Air Force base, reveled to be Fahook's hideout. There, Hildy is murdered by the mayor after giving Fahook the files, and Jack kills the mayor in revenge. Fahook escapes on a plane, but Jack manages to get on board, blowing up the base at the same time. Jack chases Fahook through the plane and battles him in the cargo hold, finally killing him by knocking him out of the plane in mid-flight while getting the files at the same time. The plane crashes back at the airbase, and Jack is the only survivor.

Jack then gives the files to reporter Kip Waterman to put on the news before he heads off to get his revenge on Hennessey. At the end of the game, Jack kills Hennessey in the boiler room of Blatz's apartment building and leaves town, stating that while he has justice for his father's murder, it will take more than him to clear the city of crime. Jack also observes that the deaths of the city's three major crime lords - Hennessey, Blatz (the man that he was framed for murdering), and Fahook - will result in a struggle for power among the criminal underworld. The FBI investigate the case and presumably clear him of the murder charges, but only Waterman knows that Jack is still alive. During the credits, Preacherman Jones, the man who helped Jack escape from prison and was also framed for a crime, receives a package from Jack with a note saying "Faith padre, faith" (something that Jack had told him earlier in the game when promising to come back for him), a bar of gold, and evidence taken from Hennessey's files that could clear Jones' name. Jones then summons a guard, presumably to give him the evidence.

== Reception ==
Reception

Aggregate score
Aggregator	Score			
Aggregator	GameCube	PC	PS2	Xbox
Metacritic	77 / 100	67 / 100	73 / 100	73 / 100

Review scores
Publication	Score			
Publication	GameCube	PC	PS2	Xbox
Edge	N/A	N/A	N/A	(UK) 7 / 10 (US) 6 / 10
Electronic Gaming Monthly	N/A	N/A	7.5/10, 7/10, 6.5/10	5.5 / 10
Eurogamer	6 / 10	6 / 10	6 / 10	6 / 10
Famitsu	N/A	N/A	N/A	8/10, 8/10, 8/10, 9/10
Game Informer	8.75 / 10	N/A	9.25 / 10	9.25 / 10
GamePro	4/5	N/A	3.5/5	3.5/5
GameRevolution	N/A	N/A	C+	C+
GameSpot	7.6 / 10	7.2 / 10	7.6 / 10	7.6 / 10
GameSpy	N/A	3/5	N/A	82%
GameZone	N/A	7.9 / 10	8 / 10	7.9 / 10
IGN	8.1 / 10	7.5 / 10	8.1 / 10	8.5 / 10
Nintendo Power	4 / 5	N/A	N/A	N/A
Official U.S. PlayStation Magazine	N/A	N/A	3/5	N/A
Official Xbox Magazine (US)	N/A	N/A	N/A	8.5 / 10
PC Gamer (US)	N/A	71%	N/A	N/A
The Cincinnati Enquirer	N/A	N/A	N/A	4/5
Entertainment Weekly	N/A	N/A	N/A	B−

The GameCube version received "generally favorable reviews", while the rest of the console versions received "average" reviews according to video game review aggregator website Metacritic. In Japan, Famitsu gave the Xbox version a score of 33 out of 40. Dead to Rights won GameSpot's 2002 "Best Story on Xbox" and "Best Story on PlayStation 2" prizes. It was a runner-up for GameSpot's annual "Best Shooter on GameCube" award, which went to TimeSplitters 2.

Maxim gave the same console version a perfect ten: "The body count is rivaled only by novel game-play features and production values that make blood spurts akin to snowflakes—no two are the same. Looking to put a new action hero on the case? Slate's the guy. Just pray he doesn't charge by the bullet". Playboy gave it a score of 85%, while The Cincinnati Enquirer gave it four stars out of five, both saying that "taking it for what it is -- a fast-paced, story-based action game with plenty of enemies and violent ways of eliminating them -- Dead to Rights is a highly enjoyable adult diversion for Xbox owners". However, AllGame gave it a score of three-and-a-half stars out of five, calling it "one of the few tough-as-nails games with the power to keep drawing you back to it, long after you've screamed enough words at the television screen to make a sailor blush". Entertainment Weekly gave it a B−, saying that the Xbox version "is weighed down with too many bad minigames, most of which seem designed with the sole intent of inducing repetitive-stress injuries".

IGN ranked the game at #90 on the list of the Top 100 PlayStation 2 Games. The staff noted that the PS2 version had improved over the Xbox version.
