= The Great Escape (2003 video game) =

- Developer: Pivotal Games
- Publishers: NA: Gotham Games; EU/AU: SCi Games
- Platforms: PlayStation 2, Xbox, Windows
- Release: NA: 23 July 2003; EU/AU: 29 August 2003; EU/AU: 12 September 2003 (PC)
- Genres: Action-adventure, stealth
- Mode: Single-player

The Great Escape is an action-adventure stealth video game based on the 1963 film of the same name. It was developed by UK-based developer Pivotal Games. The game was released on Xbox, Microsoft Windows and PlayStation 2.

== Plot ==
The game begins with a recreation of the opening moments of the movie, featuring the dialogue between Oberst von Luger, the commandant of Stalag Luft III, and RAF Group Captain Ramsey, the de facto leader of the Allied prisoners in the camp.

The first few levels of the game are framed as Ramsey recounting the previous exploits of the prominent prisoners in the camp to RAF Squadron Leader Bartlett. These include MacDonald's winter escape from Dulag Luft X and then a castle prison in 1940; Sedgwick's daring attempts to prevent the Germans from retrieving a communications code book from the wreckage of a downed RAF bomber in 1941; and Hilts' escape from Dulag Luft V in 1942. All three men are eventually captured by the Germans and transported to Stalag Luft III.

In 1944, Hilts joins the escape committee overseen by Ramsey and Bartlett. One level follows Hilts escaping the camp via the blind spot between two guard towers to perform area reconnaissance for Bartlett; the other, set during the night of the fateful escape itself, sees Sedgwick and Ashley-Pitt retrieving the length of rope requested by Hilts. A total of 76 prisoners manage to escape the camp in the dark of night.

The later levels of the game, mostly based on scenes from the movie, follow the four playable characters as they attempt to leave Germany. Hendley and Blythe jump off a moving train to avoid Gestapo officers and later steal a fighter plane from a German airfield. MacDonald and Bartlett attempt to board a bus, but are nearly captured after a Gestapo officer tricks MacDonald into responding in English, leading to a frantic rooftop chase. In France, Sedgwick helps the French Resistance ambush a German convoy in exchange for their help leaving the country. Lastly, at the Austrian-Swiss border, Hilts steals a German motorcycle and attempts to reach Switzerland.

The ending of the game differs substantially from the events of the movie. Whereas only Sedgwick escapes in the movie, with the other three characters being recaptured or killed, all of them are successful in the game. Sedgwick escapes to Spain as he does in the movie, Hendley and Blythe reach Switzerland safely, MacDonald escapes Germany aboard a cargo ship (although Bartlett's fate remains unknown), and Hilts manages to jump the border fence into Switzerland.

== Gameplay ==
Combat sequence in The Great Escape where a Heer soldier is shot.

There are four playable characters, from the film, each with a special ability:

- MacDonald (Gordon Jackson's character), who can speak German to pass himself off as a guard.
- Sedgwick (James Coburn's character), who can fix mechanical devices.
- Hilts (Steve McQueen's character), who can pick locks to get into buildings.
- Hendley (James Garner's character), who can pick pockets to get papers, keys, etc., and must also act as guide/escort to Blythe (Donald Pleasence's character).

There are 18 levels in the game. Some of these recreate scenes from the film, but most are original scenarios. The early levels of the game are all original scenarios, depicting the characters' first captures and their early escape attempts from other POW camps, all of which ultimately fail and lead to their being sent to Stalag Luft III (whereas the film began with the prisoners arriving at that camp). By contrast, the later levels of the game are nearly all based on scenes from the film, albeit significantly expanded, in particular in the case of Sedgwick, who is shown undertaking several missions for the French Resistance before escaping with their help into Spain.

Despite the cover showing Hilts with a gun hiding from a guard in the camp, such a scene never occurs in either the game or the film. The front cover may have been inspired by a scene late in the film where Hilts, disguised in German uniform, holds a gun while hiding behind a shed after trying to escape a German patrol on a motorbike.

== Cast information ==
Sound bites of Steve McQueen as Hilts were taken from the film and used in the game, famous lines such as "250", "Walking down the road" and "20 feet short" were used to recreate iconic scenes from the film. Two sound bites of McQueen replying "Yeah" were also used to respond in the affirmative when talking to other characters.

The original film score by Elmer Bernstein is heard throughout the game and adds to the authenticity.

== Reception ==
Reception

Aggregate score
Aggregator	Score		
Aggregator	PC	PS2	Xbox
Metacritic	54/100	57/100	55/100

Review scores
Publication	Score		
Publication	PC	PS2	Xbox
Computer Games Magazine	2/5	N/A	N/A
Computer Gaming World	2/5	N/A	N/A
Electronic Gaming Monthly	N/A	5/10	5/10
Eurogamer	N/A	4/10	N/A
Famitsu	N/A	27/40	N/A
Game Informer	N/A	6.5/10	7/10
GamePro	N/A	N/A	2.5/5
GameRevolution	N/A	N/A	D
GameSpot	6.1/10	6.1/10	6.1/10
GameZone	6.3/10	5.8/10	6.2/10
IGN	5/10	5/10	5/10
Official U.S. PlayStation Magazine	N/A	3.5/5	N/A
Official Xbox Magazine (US)	N/A	N/A	5.5/10
PC Gamer (US)	62%	N/A	N/A
Maxim	N/A	6/10	6/10
Playboy	N/A	63%	63%

The Great Escape received "mixed" reviews on all platforms according to video game review aggregator Metacritic. In Japan, where the PlayStation 2 version was ported and published by Marvelous Entertainment under the name Daidassō: The Great Escape (大脱走 THE GREAT ESCAPE, Daidassō Za Gureito Esukēpu) on 14 October 2004, Famitsu gave it a score of 27 out of 40. Edge gave the Xbox version a score of four out of ten and said that it was "saved by a few good set-pieces and the licence", but was critical to its gameplay in general.
