= Dead to Rights (GBA video game) =

2004 video game

- North American box art
- Developer: Torus Games
- Publishers: EU: Zoo Digital Publishing; NA: Namco Hometek
- Series: Dead to Rights
- Platform: Game Boy Advance
- Release: EU: November 26, 2004; NA: December 1, 2004
- Genre: Action
- Mode: Single-player

Dead to Rights is a 2004 top-down shooter video game developed by Torus Games and published by Namco Hometek for the Game Boy Advance. It is loosely based on the original Dead to Rights console game.

== Reception ==
Reception

Aggregate score
Aggregator	Score
Metacritic	40/100

Review scores
Publication	Score
1Up.com	F
GameSpot	3.9/10
Nintendo Power	2.8/5

The game received "generally unfavorable reviews" according to video game review aggregator Metacritic.
