= Conflict: Desert Storm II =

2003 video game

- Developer: Pivotal Games
- Publishers: PAL: SCi Games; NA: Gotham Games
- Series: Conflict
- Platforms: PlayStation 2, Windows, Xbox, GameCube
- Release: PlayStation 2, Windows, Xbox: AU: 18 September 2003; EU: 19 September 2003; AU: 26 September 2003 (PC); NA: 7 October 2003; GameCube: NA: 6 January 2004; EU: 6 February 2004; AU: 20 February 2004
- Genre: Tactical shooter
- Modes: Single-player, multiplayer

Conflict: Desert Storm II (known as Conflict: Desert Storm II - Back to Baghdad in North America) is a tactical shooter video game developed by Pivotal Games. It was released for Microsoft Windows, PlayStation 2, Xbox and GameCube. It is a sequel to Conflict: Desert Storm and the second installment in the Conflict series.

== Gameplay ==
Conflict: Desert Storm II is set during the Persian Gulf War and is based on the covert operations of 'Alpha One', a four-man special forces team of either the British SAS or US Delta Force. The player can control one member at a time but can also give remote commands to other squad members. It is possible for two players to play simultaneously, each controlling two soldiers. Up to four can play in the GameCube and Xbox versions.

The player can use different tactics, such as focusing on a head on approach or by using stealth against a variety of forces from the Iraqi military. Experience garnered by each member of the team over time results in promotions and medals awarded for distinguished conduct during missions. Several licensed weapons and vehicles such as the M16 Assault Rifle or Bradley Infantry Fighting Vehicle are also usable in-game. Different orders, such as "follow me" or "fire at will" can be given to the soldiers not being controlled by the player, who can switch control between them at will.

Each member of the four man team specialises in a specific role. For example, Foley is the designated marksman and expert sniper, Jones is the engineer and explosives expert, Connor the heavy weapons specialist and Bradley the team lead and radioman - facilitating the ability to call in air-strikes when needed.

The Xbox version of the game included the option to download additional maps via Xbox Live.

== Plot ==
On August 2, 1990, Iraqi forces invade and occupy Kuwait, resulting in an allied coalition of over 100 countries to come to the aid of Kuwait against Iraq. During the first days of Kuwait's liberation, Special Forces team Alpha One is deployed on a rescue mission to Al-Hadar, where 'Delta Two', an allied Special Forces team is trapped behind Iraqi lines. With gunships providing assistance, Alpha One breach the city walls, locate and secure Delta Two's last known position but does not immediately make visual contact with them. Alpha One continues to search the city for them the next morning, and finally locate them after battling through several Iraqi troops and supporting armour in the city. Alpha One then escort Delta Two to an evacuation point at an Iraqi communications post, which Alpha One subsequently destroy upon Delta Two's extraction before leaving themselves.

Alpha One are then sent on a covert operation to destroy an Iraqi radar site and fuel dump. Sneaking past the base defences, Alpha One successfully destroy the designated targets, however upon completion of their mission Alpha One find themselves surrounded by Iraqi troops, tanks and gunships. Seeing very little option, Bradley orders his team to surrender, and Alpha One are taken prisoner. Inside an Iraqi prison, Alpha One are brutally interrogated by their captors. A flight of Stealth fighters drop smart bombs over the complex, providing Alpha One a means to escape. Before returning to the Allied lines, Alpha One are deployed to a site housing Sarin gas as well as multiple SCUD missiles and launchers that they disarm and destroy respectively.

As the liberation of Kuwait draws near, retreating Iraqi troops are ordered to set fire to numerous Kuwaiti oil wells as part of a scorched earth policy. Alpha One are ordered to halt further damage by disarming numerous explosives on several oil wells, before linking up with forward elements of the 2nd Marines. Alpha One and the 2nd Marines then embark on a mission inside Kuwait City, where Iraq has constructed two Superguns used to stall the advance of Coalition troops in the desert. Alpha One secure an airport where Iraqi troops have emplaced SAM sites as well as an air defence grid which Alpha One both render inoperable. With air superiority ensured for the coalition troops, Alpha One then embark on the destruction of both guns in the city's harbour, eradicating any hope remaining for the Iraqi forces of success.

In an ending cutscene, Alpha One are seen viewing the re-established Emir of Kuwait thanking the Coalition forces for their assistance as Kuwait is finally liberated.

== Reception ==
Reception

Aggregate score
Aggregator	Score			
Aggregator	GameCube	PC	PS2	Xbox
Metacritic	73/100	65/100	70/100	71/100

Review scores
Publication	Score			
Publication	GameCube	PC	PS2	Xbox
Edge	N/A	N/A	N/A	7/10
Electronic Gaming Monthly	N/A	N/A	5.17/10	5.17/10
Eurogamer	N/A	6/10	N/A	6/10
Game Informer	N/A	N/A	7.75/10	7.75/10
GamePro	N/A	N/A	3/5	N/A
GameSpot	6.7/10	6.3/10	6.7/10	6.7/10
GameSpy	3/5	N/A	3/5	3/5
GameZone	7.9/10	N/A	8.2/10	8/10
IGN	7.9/10	7.9/10	7.9/10	7.9/10
Nintendo Power	3.1/5	N/A	N/A	N/A
Official U.S. PlayStation Magazine	N/A	N/A	3/5	N/A
Official Xbox Magazine (US)	N/A	N/A	N/A	7/10
PC Gamer (US)	N/A	72%	N/A	N/A

The game received "mixed or average reviews" on all platforms according to the review aggregation website Metacritic. In Japan, where the PlayStation 2 version was ported for release under the name Conflict Delta II: Wangan Sensō 1991 (コンフリクト・デルタII 湾岸戦争 1991, Konfurikuto Deruta Tsu Wangan Sensō 1991; lit. "Conflict Delta II: The 1991 Gulf War") and published by Capcom on June 30, 2005, Famitsu gave it a score of three sevens and one eight for a total of 29 out of 40.
