= Dead to Rights: Reckoning =

2005 video game

- Developer: Rebellion Developments
- Publishers: NA: Namco Hometek; EU: Electronic Arts
- Director: Tim Jones
- Series: Dead to Rights
- Platform: PlayStation Portable
- Release: NA: June 28, 2005; EU: February 3, 2006
- Genre: Third-person shooter
- Modes: Single-player, multiplayer

Dead to Rights: Reckoning is a third-person shooter video game developed by Rebellion Developments and published by Namco Hometek for the PlayStation Portable. It was released on June 28, 2005 in North America and February 3, 2006 in Europe, and is the third installment of the Dead to Rights series. It is a prequel to Dead to Rights II.

== Plot ==
Grant City police officer Jack Slate and his K-9 companion must rescue the daughter of a Grant City Senator.

== Gameplay ==
The gameplay of Dead to Rights: Reckoning is very similar to Dead to Rights II and retains the series' signature usage of bullet time, disarming moves and the ability to use Shadow as an attack dog. Similar to Dead to Rights II, this game does not contain minigames.

== Development ==
Kim Randall spoke to Games That Weren't through e-mail in February 2025 and said that Reckoning was originally a cancelled game known as 100 Bullets.

== Reception ==
Reception

Aggregate score
| Aggregator | Score |
|---|---|
| Metacritic | 54/100 |

Review scores
| Publication | Score |
|---|---|
| Game Informer | 6.5/10 |
| GameRevolution | D |
| GameSpot | 5.7/10 |
| GameSpy | 2.5/5 |
| GameZone | 6.5/10 |
| IGN | 5/10 |
| PlayStation Official Magazine – UK | 6/10 |
| Official U.S. PlayStation Magazine | 2.5/5 |
| PlayStation: The Official Magazine | 6/10 |
| VideoGamer.com | 4/10 |
| Detroit Free Press | 2/4 |

Dead to Rights: Reckoning received "mixed" reviews according to video game review aggregator Metacritic.
