= F.I.S.T.: Forged In Shadow Torch =

2021 video game

- Developer: TiGames
- Publisher: Bilibili (Note: Physical copies of the game were published by Microids.)
- Producer: Isaac Zhang
- Designers: Xuedong Song; Chuanjie Lin; Zhongyuan Liu; Kaifeng Yao
- Programmers: Jerry Yuan; Tuoming Li; Zhongwei Wu; Tak Zhang
- Artists: Zhuobin Fang; Sam Wu
- Writers: Chenchen Hu; Jia Hu
- Composer: Caisheng Bo
- Engine: Unreal Engine 4
- Platforms: PlayStation 4; PlayStation 5; Microsoft Windows; Nintendo Switch; Xbox Series X/S
- Release: PlayStation 4, PlayStation 5: WW: September 7, 2021; Microsoft Windows: WW: October 3, 2021; Nintendo Switch: EU/NA: July 12, 2022; JP: July 14, 2022; Xbox Series X/S: WW: June 27, 2023
- Genre: Metroidvania
- Mode: Single-player

F.I.S.T.: Forged In Shadow Torch is a 2021 metroidvania video game developed by TiGames and published by Bilibili. It was released on PlayStation 4 and PlayStation 5 on September 7, 2021, followed by a Windows port on October 3, 2021. The game launched on the Nintendo Switch in July 2022. It also released for Xbox Series X/S in June 2023. The game received positive reviews from critics, citing its graphics, world and gameplay.

A prequel Zoopunk will be released in 2027 for PlayStation 5, Xbox Series X/S and Microsoft Windows

== Synopsis ==
The game follows Rayton, an anthropomorphic rabbit and resident of Torch City who served as a pilot in a past conflict against the "Machine Legion". Now wielding a powerful mechanical arm fashioned from the remains of his damaged combat armor, he journeys into the heart of the city to battle the Legion and uncover a sinister conspiracy.

== Reception ==
Reception

Aggregate score
Aggregator	Score
Metacritic	PS4: 66/100; PS5: 80/100; PC: 81/100; NS: 79/100

Review scores
Publication	Score
Destructoid	8/10
Game Informer	8.5/10
Push Square	8/10

F.I.S.T. received "generally favorable reviews" on Metacritic for the PlayStation 5, Windows, and Switch versions. The PlayStation 4 version of the game received "mixed or average reviews".

Marcus Stewart of Game Informer rated the game 8.5/10, calling it "another fine example of an exploration-focused side-scroller". He praised the combat and multiple unlockable weapons, though he criticized the game's dearth of fast travel points.

John Cal McCormick of Push Square rated the game 8/10 stars, praising the graphics as "astonishing" and the characters as charming, but called some of the game's translation "clunky".

Jeremy Peeples of Hardcore Gamer rated the game 4/5, calling it a "must-buy for Metroidvania fans" with a "richer storyline than most", also saying it "controls like a dream". He compared the gameplay to Shatterhand, while calling the world reminiscent of Beyond Good & Evil.
