= Pivotal Games =

Former video game developers

Pivotal Games Limited
- Type: Subsidiary
- Industry: Video games
- Predecessor: Pumpkin Studios
- Founded: March 2000; 26 years ago
- Founders: Jim Bambra; Nick Cook; Alex McLean
- Defunct: 13 August 2008
- Fate: Closed by parent
- Headquarters: Corston, England
- Key people: Jim Bambra; (managing director); Alex McLean; (technical director); Louise Anderson; (studio manager)
- Products: Conflict series The Great Escape
- Number of employees: 109–111 (2008)
- Parent: Kaboom Studios (2000–2003); SCi Games (2003–2005); Eidos Interactive (2005–2008)

Pivotal Games Limited was a British video game developer based in Corston, England.

== History ==
Pivotal Games was founded in March 2000, by fifteen employees formerly of Pumpkin Studios (the developer of Warzone 2100), led by Jim Bambra, Nick Cook and Alex McLean. Pumpkin Studios, founded by Bambra and Cook in August 1996, had previously been closed down by its parent company, Eidos Interactive, that same month. In August 2000, the company was acquired by Kaboom Studios. Between 2002 and 2008, Pivotal Games developed all five instalments in the Conflict series, as well as The Great Escape, based on the film of the same name.

In September 2003, after financial struggles of parent company Kaboom Studios, who had at that point had already closed down sister studios Attention to Detail and Silicon Dreams Studio, SCi Games showed interest in acquiring the company. Kaboom Studios went into receivership on 9 September 2003, with all remaining assets, including still-active Pivotal Games, being transferred to Ernst & Young for sale. On 29 September 2003, SCi acquired Pivotal Games from Ernst & Young for a total of £2.36 million. In May 2005, SCi Games finalised its acquisition and merger with Eidos Interactive, the parent of Eidos Interactive, which would become in charge of SCi Games' subsidiaries. In March 2008, SCi Games closed down fourteen operating projects to counter an £81.4 million net loss from the preceding fiscal year, leading to rumours that Pivotal Games was also to be closed. On 14 July 2008, it was officially announced that the studio was to shut its doors, and 99 staff had already been made redundant, leaving only a team of 10–12 specialist personnel. Pivotal Games was closed on 13 August 2008.

== Games developed ==
Year	Title	Platforms					
Year	Title	GCN	PS2	PS3	Win	Xbox	X360
2002	Conflict: Desert Storm	Yes	Yes	No	Yes	Yes	No
2003	The Great Escape	No	Yes	No	Yes	Yes	No
2003	Conflict: Desert Storm II	Yes	Yes	No	Yes	Yes	No
2004	Conflict: Vietnam	No	Yes	No	Yes	Yes	No
2005	Conflict: Global Terror	No	Yes	No	Yes	Yes	No
2008	Conflict: Denied Ops	No	No	Yes	Yes	No	Yes

== Conflict series ==
The Conflict franchise has sold more than 6 million units. Reviews of the individual games have ranged from positive to negative. Most of the reviews were mixed or average.

=== Games ===
- Conflict: Desert Storm (2002) is set during the Persian Gulf War. The player can play either as the British Armed Forces 22 SAS Regiment or the United States Army Delta Force.
- Conflict: Desert Storm II (2003), also known as Conflict: Desert Storm II - Back to Baghdad, is set during the Persian Gulf War too and sees the same characters returning to Baghdad.
- Conflict: Vietnam (2004) is set during the Vietnam War. The characters from the first two games do not return, with new characters being introduced instead.
- Conflict: Global Terror (2005), also known as Conflict: Global Storm, is set during modern times. The game reunites the characters from the first two games, while also adding a new character.
- Conflict: Denied Ops (2008) is also set during modern times. The game only sees the return of Paul Foley, last seen in the previous entry, with new characters being introduced as well.
