= Dead to Rights: Retribution =

2010 video game

- Developer: Volatile Games
- Publisher: Namco Bandai Games (Note: Released under the Namco brand name.)
- Director: Imre Jele
- Writer: Ben Fisher
- Composer: Matt Black
- Series: Dead to Rights
- Platforms: PlayStation 3, Xbox 360
- Release: PAL: 23 April 2010; NA: 27 April 2010
- Genres: Action, third-person shooter
- Mode: Single-player

Dead to Rights: Retribution is a 2010 third-person shooter video game developed by Volatile Games and published by Namco Bandai Games for the PlayStation 3 and Xbox 360. It is a reboot of the Dead to Rights franchise featuring Grant City police officer Jack Slate and his canine companion Shadow.

== Plot ==
The game begins with Jack collapsing on a dock after disembarking from a tugboat, and is confronted by members of the Grant City Triad, who intend to kill him as revenge for earlier events. Shadow, Jack's dog, brutally kills all of the Triad members who try to attack Jack on his way to a bar where he meets his friend, an EMT named Faith Sands, and goes into the story of what happened in the game. He flashes back to a terrorist takeover of Temple Tower, where he disobeys orders from Captain Inness and charges in, killing members of the Union gang, saving hostages and pursuing Riggs, the leader of the gang, to the roof where he escapes via a futuristic helicopter. Jack believes Riggs has military training after seeing how the Union were armed and organized. Jack is saved from Inness firing him by SWAT Captain Redwater, who is a friend of Jack and his father, Frank Slate, who takes Jack and Shadow to investigate a lead on Riggs. They discover plans and simulated versions of the Temple Tower studio, and are drawn into a gunfight when Redwater arrives with the SWAT.

After holding out until more SWAT teams arrive, Frank and Jack pursue Riggs and a Triad member, splitting up to do so. Jack succeeds in arresting the Triad, but finds Frank mortally wounded nearby. Faith arrives and tries to save Frank, but fails, and Jack storms off after beating up the Triad brutally and goes to find out why his father was killed. He stops an attempted Triad bombing at Grant City Central, defeats their leader, Tseng, in hand-to-hand combat, and then returns to the area where his father was killed. He discovers that Riggs is a member of the newly formed GAC (Grant City Anti Crime Unit), which was formed by Julian Temple and now approved by the city to deal with crime in ways that go against standard ethics and protocol. Jack fights his way past GAC soldiers and destroys GAC dropships, but is knocked out by Redwater, who kills Riggs after hearing a recorded conversation between Temple and Riggs, who plot to kill Redwater. Jack manages to escape the slowly rising dropship he and Redwater are on, and Redwater's fate is left unknown when the C4 Jack attached to the ship detonates while being tossed away by Redwater.

The game picks up at the bar, where Jack reveals that he detects Faith has deceived him, and she admits she was persuaded by the GAC to help locate him. Faith is wounded by a sniper, and Jack manages to evacuate her on a helicopter she called before being shot, and is dropped off at Temple Tower, where he arrests Temple, who tries to bribe him into letting him go by revealing that Redwater killed Frank, choosing to follow his father's way instead of killing Temple in cold blood. He takes Temple to the precinct he and his father work at, and discovers all regular and SWAT officers have been imprisoned for resisting GAC control. Jack imprisons Temple and frees the officers, who help to free the precinct and call patrol officers back to fight off attacking GAC troops—with help from Captain Inness, who is now glad to work Jack's way and even sends out the transmission to call for backup. Jack takes a dead GAC soldier's armor and sneaks into the GAC Alpha Base in a rundown hospital on an island. He manages to make a distraction that lets the GCPD storm the base while Jack provides sniper cover for Inness, Shadow, and a SWAT team that manages to break into the main area. Jack helps to fight off multiple GAC troops and then pursues Redwater.

Jack takes control of a GAC Tank Armor and fights his way through dozens of GAC while furiously arguing with Redwater, offering him the chance to surrender like Frank would have done. Redwater refuses, stating that he did what he did for the good of the city and that Frank never would have understood, and Jack responds by fighting his way through a group of snipers as he chases Redwater on foot to a lighthouse. Redwater tries to kill Jack with a mounted machine gun, but Shadow bites Redwater's arm only to be wounded, forcing Jack to proceed alone and unarmed against Redwater, who cuts Jack across the eye with a knife and leaves a scar. Jack and Redwater fight, stealing the knife from each other repeatedly, until Jack stabs Redwater fatally, which results in him falling to his death. The game ends with Jack and Faith attending Frank's funeral, and Jack is left to look out at Grant City with Shadow next to him, promising his father he will be with him soon.

== Gameplay ==
For the GAC Pack, players assume the role of GAC officers trying to seize control of the GCPD's 87th Precient. They consist of a sniper named Copperhead, a bruiser named Kodiak and an unnamed tank trooper.

In Riot Control, Jack and Slate face off against waves of GAC forces with a Retribution Meter that fills up when the player takes them out. Fighting in the third/sixth round has Jack face a boss.

== Development ==
In February 2009, Namco Bandai announced Retribution was in development.

Pre-order announcements were made in early 2010 with gamers doing pre-order on Gamestop to get the "Jack Pack" or Amazon for the "Shadow Pack".

The game was released in Japan on July 8, 2010.

On April 28, 2010. Namco Bandai announced that the game will have DLC content. On May 26, 2010, the game's DLC pack, "GAC Pack", was released for PAL Territories on May 26 for Xbox LIVE Marketplace for Xbox 360 and PlayStation Network for the PS3 with the "Jack Pack" and "Shadow Pack" included, being only available to those who pre-ordered Retribution early. It was released for North America on June 1, 2010. The "GAC Pack" also included an “action mode” with explosive rounds and a “noir mode” with a black, white and red graphic filter.

On January 9, 2017, Retribution was added to Playstation Now.

== Reception ==
Reception

Aggregate score
| Aggregator | Score | |
| Aggregator | PS3 | Xbox 360 |
|---|---|---|
| Metacritic | 60/100 | 61/100 |

Review scores
| Publication | Score | |
| Publication | PS3 | Xbox 360 |
|---|---|---|
| Destructoid | N/A | 6.5/10 |
| Edge | 6/10 | 6/10 |
| Eurogamer | N/A | 5/10 |
| Famitsu | 29/40 | 29/40 |
| Game Informer | 8/10 | 8/10 |
| GamePro | N/A | 3.5/5 |
| GameRevolution | C− | C− |
| GameSpot | 7/10 | 7/10 |
| GameTrailers | 6.8/10 | N/A |
| GameZone | 4/10 | 4/10 |
| Giant Bomb | 3/5 | 3/5 |
| IGN | 6/10 | 6/10 |
| Official Xbox Magazine (US) | N/A | 5/10 |
| PlayStation: The Official Magazine | 2/5 | N/A |
| The Daily Telegraph | N/A | 7/10 |
| The Escapist | N/A | 3/5 |

Retribution received "mixed" reviews on both platforms according to video game review aggregator Metacritic. In Japan, Famitsu gave it a score of one seven, one eight, and two sevens, for a total of 29 out of 40.

The Daily Telegraph gave the Xbox 360 version a score of seven out of ten and said, "We all need a Die Hard every now and then, and that's exactly the kind of spirit Retribution evokes." 411Mania gave the same console version 6.9 out of 10, saying that calling it "a game that is just kind of there, and in this day and age, just being there is no longer enough." The Escapist gave the same console version three stars out of five, saying, "Other than the presence of your canine sidekick, there is absolutely nothing in Dead to Rights: Retribution that hasn't been done before (and probably better) in other games." However, The A.V. Club gave the PS3 version a C−, saying, "The executions are designed to provide a was-it-good-for-you catharsis. They don't. They come off as juvenile and obscene. Whatever shock value they might have wears off almost instantly, transforming the game's supposed "money-shot" into something pedestrian and tedious."

On November 5, 2010, it was reported that the game sold 350,000 copies throughout Europe and North America.
