= Conflict: Vietnam =

2004 video game

- Developers: Pivotal Games; 8bit Games (Mobile)
- Publishers: EU: SCi Games; NA: Global Star Software; Synergenix (Mobile)
- Series: Conflict
- Platforms: PlayStation 2; Windows; Xbox; Mobile
- Release: EU: 3 September 2004; AU: 11 September 2004; NA: 6 October 2004 Mobile; WW: 5 November 2004
- Genre: Tactical shooter
- Modes: Single-player; multiplayer

Conflict: Vietnam is a tactical shooter video game developed by Pivotal Games and published by Global Star Software and SCi Games for PlayStation 2, Xbox, and Windows. Released in 2004, it is the third installment in the Conflict series. A separate version was developed by 8bit Games and published by Synergenix for mobile devices the same year. A port for Gizmondo devices was planned before being cancelled.

== Gameplay ==
Conflict: Vietnam has players taking control of Frank "Ragman" Wier, Bruce "Junior" Lesh, Will "Hoss" Schafer & Harold "Cherry AKA Doc" Kahler, a squad of four 101st Airborne Division soldiers on the eve of the Tet Offensive in 1968.

=== Multiplayer ===
Multiplayer for PlayStation 2 allows two players to each control two of the squad's four men and take on Viet Cong (VC) members and North Vietnamese Army (NVA) forces.

Multiplayer for Xbox allows up to four players to play together under local co-op. If three players decide to play on Xbox, one of the players will take control of two of the squad's four men whilst the two other players will control the remaining squad soldiers individually. If two players just decide to play, then the same principle will apply like the PlayStation 2 version.

== Plot ==
Conflict: Vietnam opens in 1968, just days before the Tet Offensive begins, as 19-year-old Private Harold "Cherry (later known as Doc)" Kahler is introduced to his squadmates on a Huey gunship heading to "Ghost Town", a 101st Airborne Division base in South Vietnam. Twenty-eight-year-old Staff Sergeant Frank "Ragman" Wier is the leader, highly familiar with the Vietnam War from two previous tours of duty. Corporals Bruce "Junior" Lesh and Will "Hoss" Schafer comprise the rest of the squad. Hoss is the squad's adrenaline-junkie machine gunner, while Junior, the squad sniper, is counting the final days of his tour. The Tet Offensive occurs just after Kahler's first combat patrol, and he and the rest of Ragman's squad soon find themselves cut off behind enemy lines after the helicopters deploying them on a night patrol are shot down.

Over the next several days, the squad battles through miles of unknown jungle filled with hostile NVA and VC. After escaping a napalm strike, they meet up with "The Chief", commander of a Navy PBR. The Chief is alone prior to meeting up with Wier's squad, having dropped some Green Berets off up river where he "saw some strange shit". After fighting their way through a VC-fortified area called 'Charlie's Point', the men discover the Chief has been killed and soon meet up with a group of Montagnards. After retrieving a sacred statue and releasing several village prisoners for the leader of the village, the squad uses a radio gained as a reward to call for a helicopter extraction from the 1st Air Cav, being landed in a base under siege. After fighting off a heavy VC and NVA assault, the squad is praised by an overjoyed Major Wallace, who promises all of them commendations for their bravery. A dying VC throws a grenade into the bunker as the Major speaks, however, rendering them unconscious, and the five men are taken prisoner. Major Wallace is killed when the men are forced to play Russian roulette.

Escaping from the VC POW camp, Ragman's squad fights their way through the jungle and meets Sergeant Stone of the SASR and his squad. The two sergeants lead their men through a series of VC tunnels that the SASR were ordered to destroy. They succeed, and Stone and Wier part on good terms. Meeting up with a USMC jeep, the squad joins up with a column of trucks and tanks headed for Huế. After battling through the war-torn city and destroying numerous NVA T-34s with an M48 Patton tank, the squad mounts up in a 101st Airborne Huey. While attempting to destroy HAWK surface-to-air missile batteries in the area that were captured by the NVA, the helicopter is shot down by an RPG, crash-landing near an NVA stronghold, the Citadel of Huế. The squad infiltrates the Citadel, taking the fortress and eliminating its garrison, including a handful of tanks and the commanding general.

A closing cinematic, narrated by Kahler, tells what happens to the members of his squad after their tour. Hoss signs on for another tour, and Kahler eventually learns from a drunk CIA agent that he is fighting in Laos or Cambodia, seeking the thrill of combat. Junior finally goes home, but meets an unjust fate after he joins the Black Panther Party and is killed in a shootout with the FBI. Ragman comes home to an empty house and divorce papers, and moves to live in the Rocky Mountains with his dog, Ho Chi Minh, having found peace. Kahler moves to New York City, raises a family, and becomes a respected doctor, utilizing his experience as a combat medic to treat wounds caused by inner-city violence.

== Reception ==
Reception

Aggregate score
Aggregator	Score		
Aggregator	PC	PS2	Xbox
Metacritic	55/100	58/100	60/100

Review scores
Publication	Score		
Publication	PC	PS2	Xbox
Edge	N/A	5/10	5/10
Electronic Gaming Monthly	N/A	5.83/10	5.83/10
Eurogamer	N/A	N/A	6/10
Game Informer	N/A	7/10	7/10
GamePro	N/A	2.5/5	2.5/5
GameSpot	6.1/10	6.1/10	6.1/10
GameSpy	2.5/5	2.5/5	2.5/5
GameZone	N/A	N/A	7.5/10
IGN	6.7/10	6.7/10	6.7/10
Official U.S. PlayStation Magazine	N/A	2.5/5	N/A
Official Xbox Magazine (US)	N/A	N/A	7/10
PC Gamer (US)	52%	N/A	N/A
The Sydney Morning Herald	N/A	2.5/5	N/A
The Times	N/A	3/5	N/A

The game received "mixed" reviews on all platforms according to the review aggregation website Metacritic.

Maxim gave the game a score of six out of ten, saying, "figuring out how to work the controller is absolutely infuriating, meaning you go into firefights against stealthy Charlie with no knowledge of your environment, opponent, or weapon." The Times similarly gave the PlayStation 2 version three stars out of five and said, "It is the clichéd choice of music played on the camp radio that makes you wonder whether it is worth delving deeper into this game," citing the use of "Paint It Black" in the TV series Tour of Duty and of "Nowhere to Run" in Good Morning, Vietnam. The Sydney Morning Herald, however, gave the same console version two-and-a-half stars out of five, saying: "Squeezing the Desert Storm games into the currently fashionable Vietnam setting was a mistake. Open landscapes are replaced by claustrophobic jungle, eliminating tactical freedom. Players edge along narrow paths, progressing from one firefight to the next."
