= Zoopunk =

Upcoming video games

- Developer: TiGames
- Publisher: TiGames
- Engine: Unreal Engine 5
- Platforms: Windows; PlayStation 5; Xbox Series X/S
- Release: 2027
- Genre: Action role-playing
- Mode: Single-player

Zoopunk is an upcoming action role-playing video game developed and published by TiGames. The game is a prequel to F.I.S.T.: Forged In Shadow Torch (2021), and changes the earlier game's side-scrolling Metroidvania format into a three-dimensional, third-person action role-playing game.

== Gameplay ==
The game is played from a third-person perspective and combines melee and ranged combat with exploration. TiGames has described its areas as wider and more vertically layered than those in F.I.S.T., but not as a seamless open world. Three playable characters were announced: Rayton, an agile rabbit who specializes in close-range attacks; Braton, a rhinoceros who fights with heavy attacks and a large flame sword; and Trixie, a chipmunk who relies on acrobatics and hit-and-run tactics. Each character has a distinct combat role.

== Premise ==
The story is set decades before F.I.S.T.: Forged In Shadow Torch, during the origins of Torch City. The discovery of Fire Seed energy accelerates technological development but also awakens mechanical debris, which becomes a self-aware mechanical empire. Rayton, Braton, and Trixie travel through territories controlled by competing animal factions as the First Torch War begins, with the characters shown pursuing an object called the Spark.

== Development and release ==
The game is currently being developed by the Chinese studio TiGames, which previously developed F.I.S.T.: Forged In Shadow Torch (2021). TiGames began informal discussions about the project in early 2023 and began prototype development in 2024. Studio chief executive Tao Zhang said that the development team had grown from about 20 people to approximately 50, while retaining members of the earlier game's action-design team and composer Caisheng Bo. Chinese concept artist Su Jian was invited to contribute to the visual design. The game is being made with Unreal Engine 5, replacing the predecessor's use of Unreal Engine 4. TiGames cited the newer engine's handling of fur, feathers, lighting, and larger environments as reasons for the change. The term animal punk was used by the developers to describe the combination of anthropomorphic characters, industrial machinery, ruins, and resistance to technological domination.

The January 2025 Nvidia technology demonstration was the first public announcement of the game, which was then described as a project in the same setting as F.I.S.T. In an interview published during CES 2025, Zhang called Zoopunk a provisional title and described it as a conventional PC and console game rather than an AI-focused experiment. However, following the November 2025 gameplay reveal, the game's visual assets and an in-game tool allowing players to use generative AI for creating content sparked online discussion. TiGames publicly clarified that the core game is entirely human-made.

TiGames formally revealed the game with a gameplay trailer during the Xbox Partner Preview on November 20, 2025. A second trailer premiered during Gamescom Opening Night Live on August 25, 2026, followed by an extended five-minute gameplay presentation. The game is set to be released for Windows, PlayStation 5, and Xbox Series X and Series S in 2027.

== Reception ==
Writing after the 2025 reveal, Alberto Zaragoza Lerma of MeriStation characterized the move from a Metroidvania to a three-dimensional action role-playing game as a substantial change from F.I.S.T.. Michael Hoglund of Windows Central praised the game's "grizzled combat and wondrous colors" but noted that certain visual elements felt off.

At Gamescom 2026, GamesRadar+ compared the presentation's premise and large-machine combat to other third-person action games, but commented that the density of the trailer made the action difficult to follow. Fabiano Uslenghi of GameStar called it his action game "surprise" of the event.
