= Conflict: Denied Ops =

2008 video game

- Developer: Pivotal Games
- Publisher: Eidos Interactive
- Composer: Richard Jacques
- Engine: Conflict Engine
- Platforms: Xbox 360; PlayStation 3; Microsoft Windows
- Release: EU: February 8, 2008; NA: February 12, 2008; AU: February 21, 2008; JP: January 16, 2009
- Genre: Tactical shooter
- Modes: Single-player, multiplayer

Conflict: Denied Ops is a tactical shooter video game developed by Pivotal Games and published by Eidos Interactive for Microsoft Windows, PlayStation 3 and Xbox 360. It is the fifth and final installment in the Conflict series. Originally, the game was to be called "Crossfire" but was later changed. It released on February 8, 2008, in Europe, February 12, 2008, North America, February 21, 2008, in Australia and January 16, 2009, in Japan.

It is the first game in the series to be released on the PlayStation 3 and Xbox 360. Unlike previous games in the series, this game is played in a first-person perspective.

The game takes place in a fictional war in Venezuela. Player controls the character named Lincoln Graves, a sniper who is assigned by the CIA operatives along with his partner Reggie Lang to take down General Ramirez and any other possible threats.

The game received mixed reviews from critics, garnering praise for its graphics, HUD system and destructible environment but criticized for its unoriginal and generic gameplay and broken co-op system.

== Gameplay ==
The game is played in a first-person perspective, instead of the third-person viewpoint of the four preceding titles, and is also the first game in the Conflict series which does not feature four main characters. Denied Ops is based around two CIA operatives, each having his own weapon and style: a sniper named Lincoln Graves who uses an SR-25 with an undermounted M26 MASS, and a machine gun operator named Reggie Lang who uses an M249 PARA with an undermounted M320 grenade launcher. The two characters have quite opposite personalities. Lang is rather loud and noisy while Graves is quiet and stealthy.

In single player mode, the player can switch between controlling each operative. In co-op, each player controls one operative. The operatives only use their weapon of choice, and cannot pick up enemy weapons. Ammunition for firearms is unlimited, but explosives are not and must be replenished at resupply boxes found throughout the levels.

== Plot ==
The story takes place in a fictional war in Venezuela. General Ramírez and his associates have staged the Ramírez regime where Ramírez is slowly plotting to take over his country. First he sends his troops to seize the Petro Nivera oil refinery, then threatens to deploy nuclear weapons if the United States continue to "meddle in his country's affairs". The US government sends two CIA operatives, Lincoln Graves and Reggie Lang, on a series of missions to take down General Ramírez and any other possible threat. First the two operatives are sent to the ruins of the Santa Cecilia monastery to retrieve important data on Ramírez's connections and associates. After extracting via their commander, they encounter a number of different conflicts across Africa and Russia, taking down Abasi Atongwe, a close associate of Ramirez in the Congo and dismantling internationally held nuclear weapons created by Dr Pessich. After a fierce battle at the Petro Nivea oil refinery, they track down Ramírez and end up arresting him.

== Reception ==
Reception

Aggregate score
Aggregator	Score		
Aggregator	PC	PS3	Xbox 360
Metacritic	58/100	51/100	52/100

Review scores
Publication	Score		
Publication	PC	PS3	Xbox 360
Edge	N/A	N/A	5/10
Eurogamer	N/A	N/A	5/10
Famitsu	N/A	24/40	24/40
Game Informer	5.75/10	5.75/10	5.75/10
GamePro	N/A	N/A	2.25/5
GameSpot	6.5/10	5.5/10	5.5/10
GameTrailers	6.5/10	6.5/10	6.5/10
IGN	4/10	4/10	4/10
Official Xbox Magazine (US)	N/A	N/A	5.5/10
PC Gamer (US)	66%	N/A	N/A
PC PowerPlay	5/10	N/A	N/A
PlayStation: The Official Magazine	N/A	3.5/5	N/A

The game received "mixed" reviews on all platforms according to the review aggregation website Metacritic. It was criticized for its unoriginal and generic gameplay and broken co-op system. In Japan, where the game was ported for release under the name Double Clutch (ダブルクラッチ, Daburu Kuratchi), then published by Spike for the PlayStation 3 and Xbox 360 versions on September 11, 2008, and by E Frontier for the PC version on January 16, 2009, Famitsu gave the first two console versions each a score of all four sixes for a total of 24 out of 40.
