= Conflict: Desert Storm =

2002 video game

- Developers: Pivotal Games; Synergenix (Mobile)
- Publishers: EU: SCi Games; NA: Gotham Games; EU: Kayak Interactive (Mobile); JP: Capcom
- Producer: Nick Cook
- Composer: Jon Vincent
- Series: Conflict
- Platforms: PlayStation 2, Windows, Xbox, GameCube, mobile phone
- Release: 13 September 2002: PlayStation 2, Windows, Xbox; EU: 13 September 2002; AU: 20 September 2002 (Xbox); AU: 27 September 2002 (PS2); NA: 1 October 2002; AU: 25 October 2002 (PC) GameCube; EU: 18 April 2003; NA: 22 April 2003; AU: 9 May 2003 Mobile; EU: 20 August 2004
- Genre: Tactical shooter
- Modes: Single-player, multiplayer

Conflict: Desert Storm is a tactical shooter video game developed by Pivotal Games and published by SCi Games and Gotham Games for Microsoft Windows, PlayStation 2, Xbox, and GameCube; it is the first installment in the Conflict series. Another game of the same name was produced for Mobile phones, developed by Synergenix and published by Kayak Interactive.

The player can enlist and lead a squad in either the British Armed Forces 22 SAS Regiment or the United States Army Delta Force. Each soldier in the squad has a unique specialty, such as demolitions, sniper rifles, machine guns, and assault rifles. To complete each mission successfully, the player must utilize the skills of each squad member, such as using their demolitions expert to destroy bridges, their heavy weapons specialist to destroy tanks, etc. Prior to beginning a campaign, the player can run through the basic training portion of the game, which will cover the use of weapons, as well being trained in the use of artillery and airstrikes, along with basic medical skills and squad maneuvers. The game includes a player-controllable Humvee and M2/M3 Bradley Fighting Vehicle.

The multiplayer allows players to complete the campaign cooperatively. The PlayStation 2 version allows for 2-player co-op while the Xbox and GameCube versions allow for 2-4 player co-op. The Windows version does not support co-op, but however supports online PVP multiplayer.

== Story ==
Iraq launches an invasion of Kuwait on August 2, 1990. A sniper, Paul Foley and a teammate are deployed behind enemy lines to destroy a bridge to slow the Iraqi advance, but Foley's teammate is killed and Foley himself is captured. The next day, rifleman John Bradley is inserted into the area to rescue Foley and complete Foley's mission to destroy the bridge. Fighting his way through mechanized infantry, Bradley succeeds in rescuing Foley and together they destroy the bridge before being extracted by a helicopter.

Next, Bradley and Foley are deployed into Kuwait City after the Emir of Kuwait is cornered by Iraqi forces while evacuating the city. The two link up with teammate Mick Connors, a heavy weapons specialist and fight their way through infantry and tanks to rescue the Emir and evacuate him via an RAF helicopter on the other side of the city.

With Operation Desert Storm in full swing, the team, now joined by demolitions expert David Jones, raid an Iraqi air base to retrieve vital data on Iraqi SCUD launchers operating against Saudi Arabia and Israel. In the process, the team destroys the base's fighters and fuel depot and opens the way for an air strike to destroy an early warning radar located at the base. Using the data stolen from the air base, Alpha Two attacks Iraqi SCUD launchers in order to prevent Iraq from using the missiles to bring Israel into the war. Alpha-Two succeeds in destroying three areas containing multiple SCUD launchers and disrupts an Iraqi communications hardline passing through one of the areas. Shortly afterwards, while returning from a mission, Alpha-Two's helicopter is shot down by an Iraqi shoulder-fired surface-to-air missile, and Alpha-Two is forced to defend a plateau from attacking forces until a search and rescue helicopter arrives to extract them and the injured helicopter crew.

As the war continues, Alpha-Two takes part in the Battle of Khafji when the town is invaded by Iraqi infantry and tanks. With the help of MLRS strikes, Alpha-Two clears the town of enemy forces. Shortly afterwards, as Iraqi cavalry forces begin to retreat, Alpha-Two is sent to destroy Iraqi air defenses to open the way for an air strike to destroy a bridge and prevent further retreat. With all avenues of retreat destroyed, Alpha-Two is sent on a scouting mission to clear the road for U.S. cavalry to attack the retreating Tawalkana Division of the Iraqi Republican Guard. Alpha-Two destroys multiple tank traps, enemy tanks and anti-air defenses with the help of a Bradley infantry fighting vehicle and air strikes from A-10 Warthog attack aircraft.

With the war turning against the Iraqi Army, Alpha-Two is deployed on a mission into Baghdad itself under cover of a night bombing by stealth fighters in order to rescue American POWs from a compound in Baghdad. Alpha-Two succeeds in rescuing three POWs and flees the city with them in a truck.

In late February, Coalition forces detect a Soviet-made ICBM being taken into an Iraqi factory in southern Baghdad. Realizing that Iraq can use the nuclear weapon to destroy any city within a thousand-mile radius, Bradley, Foley and Connors are sent in with a scientist named Doctor Franklin to disarm the ICBM and retrieve weapons-grade plutonium that Iraq has acquired and intends to use to create tactical nuclear missiles. Despite heavy resistance, the team manages to sneak into the factory using nearby sewers and locate the plutonium and ICBM. After a booby-trap causes the warhead to start to go critical, Doctor Franklin disarms it under fire as the rest of the team lay down covering fire. With the ICBM disarmed and the plutonium in hand, the team and Doctor Franklin are extracted to safety.

Though Kuwait is liberated, the Supreme Commander of the Iraqi Army, General Aziz, refuses to surrender and prepares to fight to the last man. With the general preparing for a counterattack, Alpha-Two is dispatched into Iraq to assassinate General Aziz and end the war. As General Aziz's headquarters is a heavily defended and shielded bunker within a 13th-century Crusader fort, Alpha-Two is forced to infiltrate the fort and take down its air defenses. An air strike armed with "bunker buster" bombs is called in upon General Aziz's bunker, destroying it. Though General Aziz tries to flee the air strike, he is shot dead by Alpha-Two as he emerges from the bunker and the team is extracted by helicopter.

With General Aziz dead and the Iraqi Army decimated, the Coalition declares victory. In a liberated Kuwait City, the Emir publicly thanks the men and women who risked their lives to liberate his country. Alpha-Two is congratulated and rotated out for rest and relaxation.

== Characters ==
US Delta Force/22SAS/Alpha Two

- Sergeant John Bradley - Team Leader/Rifleman
- Corporal Paul Foley - Sniper/Medic
- Corporal Mick Connors - Heavy Weapons Specialist
- Corporal David Jones - Combat Engineer/Medic

Other Characters

- Dr. Franklin - Nuclear Scientist
- Reserves of US Delta Force/22SAS
- Master Sergeant Johnson - Senior Drill Instructor
- Emir Jaber III - The Emir of Kuwait
- General Aziz - Supreme Commander of the Iraqi Army
- Master Sergeant Franks - Senior Drill Instructor
- Master Sergeant Boothe - Senior Drill Instructor

Additionally, if a squad member is killed during a mission, they will be replaced with a variety of named characters for the remainder of the campaign.

== Reception ==
Reception

Aggregate scores
Aggregator	Score				
Aggregator	GameCube	mobile	PC	PS2	Xbox
GameRankings	69%	N/A	66%	70%	76%
Metacritic	62/100	N/A	56/100	55/100	65/100

Review scores
Publication	Score				
Publication	GameCube	mobile	PC	PS2	Xbox
Edge	N/A	N/A	7/10	7/10	7/10
Electronic Gaming Monthly	5.83/10	N/A	N/A	N/A	N/A
Eurogamer	6/10	N/A	8/10	N/A	N/A
Famitsu	N/A	N/A	N/A	28/40	N/A
Game Informer	6/10	N/A	N/A	N/A	6/10
GamePro	3/5	N/A	N/A	N/A	3.5/5
GameRevolution	N/A	N/A	N/A	C	C+
GameSpot	5.1/10	5.2/10	4.8/10	4.5/10	4.8/10
GameSpy	2/5	N/A	N/A	3/5	N/A
IGN	7.7/10	N/A	N/A	5.5/10	7.7/10
Nintendo Power	3/5	N/A	N/A	N/A	N/A
Official U.S. PlayStation Magazine	N/A	N/A	N/A	1.5/5	N/A
Official Xbox Magazine (US)	N/A	N/A	N/A	N/A	6.6/10
PC Gamer (US)	N/A	N/A	51%	N/A	N/A
The Village Voice	6/10	N/A	N/A	N/A	N/A

By July 2006, the PlayStation 2 version of Conflict: Desert Storm had sold 800,000 copies and earned $24 million in the United States. Next Generation ranked it as the 76th highest-selling game launched for the PlayStation 2, Xbox or GameCube between January 2000 and July 2006 in that country. Combined sales of the Conflict series reached 1.3 million units in the United States by July 2006. The game ultimately sold 2 million copies by December 2003.

The game received "mixed" reviews on all platforms according to the review aggregation website Metacritic. In Japan, where the PlayStation 2 version was ported for release under the name Conflict Delta: Wangan Sensō 1991 (コンフリクト・デルタ 湾岸戦争 1991, Konfurikuto Deruta Wangan Sensō 1991; lit. "Conflict Delta: The 1991 Gulf War") and published by Capcom on December 18, 2003, Famitsu gave it a score of all four sevens for a total of 28 out of 40.
