= Dead to Rights =

- Genres: Third-person shooter, action
- Developers: Namco Hometek (I); Widescreen Games (II); Rebellion Developments (III); Volatile Games (IV)
- Publishers: Namco Hometek; Electronic Arts; Namco Bandai Games
- Platforms: Windows, PlayStation 2, Xbox, GameCube, PlayStation Portable, PlayStation 3, Xbox 360
- First release: Dead to Rights; June 3, 2002
- Latest release: Dead to Rights: Retribution; April 1, 2010

Dead to Rights is a third-person shooter action video game series focusing on Jack Slate, a police officer in the fictional Grant City, and his K-9 partner Shadow. There are four games in the series.

== Games ==
=== Dead to Rights ===
Dead to Rights, the first game in the series, was developed by Namco and released as a timed exclusive for the Xbox in 2002. Releases for the PlayStation 2 and GameCube followed thereafter, and the game was ported to Microsoft Windows a year later.

The game focuses on Jack Slate, a police officer partnered with his dog Shadow. The two patrol Grant City, a metropolis seemingly populated with more criminals than honest citizens. One night while on a routine patrol, Jack responds to a call at a construction zone, only to find his own father murdered. In pursuit of his father's killer, Jack is led through a labyrinth of crime and corruption.

=== Dead to Rights (Game Boy Advance) ===
A top-down shooter based loosely on the original game.

=== Dead to Rights II ===
Dead to Rights II, the second game in the series, is a prequel to the first game, developed by Widescreen Games and released for Microsoft Windows, Xbox, and PlayStation 2. The game retains many of the original game's gameplay elements. It focuses on Jack and Shadow searching for a reputable judge and a kidnapped friend of Jack's father.

=== Dead to Rights: Reckoning ===
Dead to Rights: Reckoning, the third game in the series, was developed by Rebellion Developments and was released for the PlayStation Portable. It serves as a prequel to Dead to Rights II, making it chronologically the earliest in the series. It focuses on Jack Slate rescuing the kidnapped daughter of a Grant City official.

=== Dead to Rights: Retribution ===
Dead to Rights: Retribution is a reboot of the series and the fourth installment overall, focusing on vice officer Jack Slate and his canine companion Shadow exposing criminal elements in the crumbling metropolis of Grant City. For the first time in the series, players can fight as Shadow.
