= Probotector =

Probotector is an alternate title originally given to a number of Contra video games in Europe, including robots instead of Human soldiers as main characters. By itself, the title was affixed to three different games, and may refer to the European localizations of:

- Contra (video game) for the Nintendo Entertainment System, 1987
- Operation C (video game) for the Game Boy, 1991
- Contra: Hard Corps for the Mega Drive, 1994

== See also ==
- Super Contra, also known as Probotector II: Return of the Evil Forces.
- Contra III: The Alien Wars, also known as Super Probotector: Alien Rebels.
