= Hard Corps: Uprising =

2011 video game

- Hard Corps: Uprising cover art
- Developer: Arc System Works
- Publisher: Konami
- Director: Hideyuki Anbe
- Producers: Hiroyuki Chiwata; Kenji Yamamoto
- Designer: Hideyuki Anbe
- Programmer: Yuji Ota
- Artist: Daisuke Ishiwatari
- Writers: Seiji Fukumoto; Hideyuki Anbe; Daisuke Ishiwatari
- Composer: Daisuke Ishiwatari
- Series: Contra
- Platforms: Xbox 360; PlayStation 3
- Release: Xbox 360; February 16, 2011; PlayStation 3: JP/NA: March 15, 2011; PAL: March 23, 2011
- Genre: Run and gun
- Modes: Single-player, multiplayer

Hard Corps: Uprising is a run and gun game developed by Arc System Works and published by Konami for the Xbox 360 and the PlayStation 3. The game was released digitally on Xbox Live Arcade on February 16, 2011 and on the PlayStation Network in March 2011. In Hard Corps: Uprising, the player assumes the role of an elite soldier simply called Bahamut, along with other main characters. Konami has added three additional player characters (Sayuri, Harley Daniels, and Leviathan) via downloadable content.

Hard Corps: Uprising is the thirteenth overall installment in the Contra series and serves as a prequel to both the original game and Contra: Hard Corps. Producer Kenji Yamamoto has said that the intention is to "link [the game] to Contra: Hard Corps" and "make [Uprising] into a brand new franchise", taking inspiration from the previous Contra installments.

== Gameplay ==
Hard Corps: Uprising features two main game modes, Rising and Arcade. In Rising Mode, players can collect points throughout levels which are then used to purchase various upgrades and customization for weapons, armor and character abilities. Both modes also feature a health bar, similar to the Japanese release of Contra: Hard Corps, allowing the player to take more than one hit before losing a life. Arcade Mode is a more difficult game mode in which the power-up shops are removed.

Many new moves have been added. The character can dash, dash in mid-air, double-jump and deflect enemy projectiles by bouncing them back. Additional moves can also be purchased in Rising Mode.

Weapons include the standard rifle, the machine gun, the spread shot, the crash gun (shoots arcing grenades), the ripple gun (acts like a force field when sprinting), the heat gun (shoots large blasts of fire), the chain laser (homes in on enemy targets) and the Katana (unleashes a wide arc of energy onto the targets). As in Contra III: The Alien Wars, the player can carry two weapons and switch between them at any time. By collecting the same weapon several times the player will improve its firing rate and power. Other weapon upgrades are available in Rising Mode as well.

Hard Corps: Uprising can be played in local or online 2-player co-op.

== Plot ==
In 2613, twenty years before the events of the original Contra, the world is ruled by an empire known as the Commonwealth, under the reign of Tiberius. Neighboring nations have suffered under the Commonwealth's oppression and resistance forces rise across the land. However, so many resistance fighters have fallen to the overwhelming might of the empire, that their strength is now severely diminished. A group of elite soldiers rise through the ranks of the resistance and band together to execute a desperate plan. The leader of this group is the war hero Bahamut.

== Characters ==
- Bahamut - Once a soldier of the Commonwealth army, he turned on his comrades after witnessing an imperial squad execute innocent people. He shares his name with the main antagonist from Contra: Hard Corps, but the producers have said it could also be a different Bahamut. He could be seen as the equivalent of Bill Rizer of other Contra games.
- Krystal - A woman with seemingly no previous combat experience. However, after her hometown is attacked by imperial forces, she decides to join Bahamut. She wears an eye patch on her right eye and is one of the fastest characters of the game.
- Harley Daniels - A bike-riding soldier sporting an extreme pompadour hairstyle. He has an extremely solid and confident personality, nothing can stop him as he loves to rock things up on the battlefields.
- Sayuri - A samurai who wears a kimono and sugegasa. She's extremely powerful compared to the other characters. It is later revealed in the game that she is Tiberius's adopted daughter and that her only motive was to take revenge on him for abandoning Sayuri and her mother. Second character in the Contra series to wield katana.
- Leviathan - Bahamut's former friend and rival when he was still in the Commonwealth. He sets out to find out why his friend betrayed the empire. He commands his own special mechas known by its first name "Knight" (English dub only). He is an equivalent of Lance Bean who is a former friend of Bill Rizer before Shattered Soldier.
- Geo Mandrake - An elite scientist for the Commonwealth who works in a secret weapons research facility and joins forces with Bahamut in order to protect his wife and daughter from the tyranny of the Empire. He is held hostage in the capital laboratory and has to be escorted to the exit.
- Tiberius - The ruler of the Commonwealth calls himself the "Emperor" and has built his empire by invading neighboring nations. He organized his Death Squad to eradicate enemy armies. He is also revealed to be Sayuri's adoptive father through her story. He is a counterpart to both Master Contra in Neo Contra, and the Chief Salamander in Contra ReBirth.

== Development and release ==
=== Audio ===
The game's soundtrack is composed by Daisuke Ishiwatari.

== Reception ==
Reception

Aggregate scores
Aggregator	Score	
Aggregator	PS3	Xbox 360
GameRankings	75%	76%
Metacritic	76/100	75/100

Review scores
Publication	Score	
Publication	PS3	Xbox 360
1Up.com	N/A	C−
Edge	N/A	7/10
Eurogamer	N/A	7/10
Game Informer	9/10	9/10
GamePro	N/A	3.5/5
GameRevolution	N/A	A−
GameSpot	7/10	7/10
GameTrailers	N/A	7.9/10
GameZone	8/10	N/A
IGN	8.5/10	8.5/10
Official Xbox Magazine (US)	N/A	7.5/10
PlayStation: The Official Magazine	7/10	N/A
Metro	N/A	7/10

Hard Corps: Uprising received "generally favorable reviews" on both platforms according to the review aggregation website Metacritic. Game Informer and Official Xbox Magazine gave the game a favorable review while it was still in development.

Daemon Hatfield of IGN said, "If you've ever been into Contra or Metal Slug or action movies, Hard Corps: Uprising is for you." He criticized Arcade Mode for being too punishing but praised Rising Mode for its upgrade system which decreased difficulty for players. He also praised the detail and art direction of the game, enjoying the anime feel of the game and the many things happening in the background (like the giant snake boss moving in the background in Level 1). Nathan Meunier of GameSpot said, "If the unmistakable opening prog-metal guitar riff and the frenzy of bullets that erupt from the get-go aren't a dead giveaway, the game's sadistic difficulty should be enough to jog your memory." His main issue was the brutal gameplay and multiple cheap shots encountered during the game. He advises players that they should not go solo unless they are hard core players. He too praised the art style, saying "The beautiful hand-drawn art style has a pleasant anime vibe that updates the otherwise classic run-and-gun gameplay. Not only does each stage offer a stark visual contrast from the previous one, but they also throw in new and unexpected twists that break up the flow." Contra Central said it's highly creative game that changes constantly and keeps the player awake. They also pointed that hand-drawn art style, which has a pleasant anime vibe, gives new life to classic run-and-gun gameplay.

Since its release, the Xbox 360 version sold 71,042 units worldwide by the end of 2011.
