= Contra Force =

1992 video game

- Cover art of Contra Force
- Developer: Konami
- Publisher: Konami
- Programmer: Mitsuo Takemoto
- Artist: Koji Horie
- Composers: Kenichi Matsubara; Tomoya Tomita
- Series: Contra
- Platform: NES
- Release: NA: September 1992
- Genre: Run and gun
- Modes: Single-player multiplayer

Contra Force is a 1992 run and gun game developed and published by Konami for the Nintendo Entertainment System in North America. It is part of the Contra series, being the third game in the series released for the NES following the original Contra and Super Contra. However, the game's plot and setting are unrelated to both previous and succeeding entries, as the villains in the game are human terrorists instead of an alien menace. The game was scheduled to be released in Japan under the title of Arc Hound (アークハウンド, Āku Haundo), with no ties to the Contra series, but was cancelled.

== Gameplay ==
Contra Force begins with the player being asked to choose between one of four characters. In addition to Burns, the team's leader, the player can also choose between Iron, a heavy weapons expert; Smith, a sharpshooter; and Beans, a demolitions expert. Each character differs from each other, not just in what weapons they wield, but also in their speed and jumping ability.

The game consists of five stages: the odd-numbered stages (1, 3, and 5) are played from the standard side-view perspective, while the even-numbered stages (2 and 4) are played from an overhead perspective (similar to the ones in Super Contra and Operation C). The objective is as simple as getting to the end of each stage, fighting every enemy who gets in the way, before confronting the boss awaiting at the end. Stages in the game are the Warehouse, Harbor, Mati Building, Aircraft Rumble, and lastly, the Blue Group Headquarters.

The controls are similar to previous Contra games. At the side-view stages the player can run left or right, as well as crouch and jump, whereas in the top-view stages the player can move in eight directions (but cannot jump nor crouch). Shooting is possible at any of the eight directions depending on the context. Instead of the instant power-ups from previous Contra games, the player has a power selection meter similar to the Gradius series which shows what power-ups the player can obtain. The player must pick up briefcase-shaped power-ups, which are hidden within the destructible environment of each stage, to move the cursor on the indicator by one increment. When the cursor is on the power-up the player wants to obtain, the player can confirm their selection with the select button. The items on the indicators include a standard-issue pistol for every character, two character-specific weapons, a turbo fire power-up that increases the number of bullets on-screen, and a rolling attack that keeps the character invulnerable to enemy fire while in mid-air.

The player can pause the game and go to a sub-menu where they can change their current character. At the sub-menu, the player can assign another character to a second player or call forth a computer-controlled partner. The player can assign from one of six possible strategies to their partner ranging between defensive and offensive. The partner character will then appear for five seconds to assist the player before disappearing. When the partner is gone, the player can summon him again from the sub-menu. Each character has only three lives. If a single player loses all of their lives as one character, the game will end. The player can use the sub-menu to switch to another character that still has extra lives before that happens. In the 2-player mode, if one player loses all of their lives, they can be assigned another character, but the character that lost all of his lives will become unusable. Unlimited chances to continue are provided.

== Plot ==
In 1992, C-Force, a task force composed of former military professionals, is formed to protect Neocity from terrorism. One day, the team's leader, Burns, receives a phone call from their informant Fox, who tells him that the Head of Intelligence is being threatened by a criminal organization known as D.N.M.E. Burns arranges a meeting at the Harbor with Fox to learn more about the situation, only to find Fox's corpse when he arrives at the destination. Now it is up to C-Force to save Neocity from D.N.M.E.

== Development ==
A Japanese ad for Arc Hound showing the main promotional art

Contra Force was originally planned to be released in Japan under the title of Arc Hound in 1991 and originally did not have any ties to the Contra series. The game was announced in magazines such as Famicom Tsūshin and advertised in official Konami brochures with a scheduled October release, but this early version of the game was cancelled.

Despite the cancellation of Arc Hound in Japan, the game was still localized for the North American market as a spinoff of the Contra series. Initially scheduled for a Winter 1991 release, Contra Force was announced as the third console game in the series, being released sometime prior to Contra III: The Alien Wars (known as Contra IV at the time). However, Contra Force was delayed to an October 1992 release, a few months later than Contra III, causing the latter game to be renumbered prior to release.

== Reception ==
Reception

Review score
Publication	Score
AllGame	3/5

Contra Force has received mixed reception. Allgame editor Brett Alan Weiss criticized the slowdown and flicker that the game suffers from, but praised the added strategy of being able to select from different characters each with their own unique skills and weapons.
