= Contra: Rogue Corps =

2019 video game

- Developer: Toylogic
- Publisher: Konami
- Directors: Daichi Kurumiya; Nobuya Nakazato
- Producer: Nobuya Nakazato
- Designer: Katsuro Ouchi
- Programmer: Katsufumi Fujimoto
- Artist: Atsushi Yamaguchi
- Writers: Evan Dorkin; Sarah Dyer
- Composers: Takahiro Nishi; Takashi Okamoto
- Series: Contra
- Platforms: Nintendo Switch; PlayStation 4; Windows; Xbox One
- Release: September 24, 2019
- Genres: Run and gun, twin-stick shooter
- Modes: Single-player, Multiplayer

Contra: Rogue Corps is a run and gun twin-stick shooter in the Contra series developed by Toylogic and published by Konami. It was released on September 24, 2019 for the Nintendo Switch, PlayStation 4, Windows, and Xbox One.

Rogue Corps is set in the fictional Damned City two years after Contra III: The Alien Wars and Contra 4, featuring four playable characters and a wide degree of weapon customization. The game received generally mixed reviews upon release. It was criticized for its gameplay, graphics, and story, although praise fell toward its upgrade and customization system.

== Gameplay ==
The gameplay utilizes a mixture of side-scrolling, third-person, isometric, and top-down perspective shooters, similar to Neo Contra. The gameplay modes are single-player story campaign, multiplayer online cooperative, and four-player local cooperative (with separate Switch consoles). It is based on player versus environment (PVE) gameplay, with dual analog controller sticks.

Players configure a main weapon and sub-weapon in real time. These have unlimited ammunition, but also a heat meter to be managed. Between stages, weapons are upgraded and uniquely customized. As a last resort, the player can clear the area with a huge bomb or use the character's special ability.

== Plot ==
The story is set several years after that of Contra III: The Alien Wars, taking place in Damned City. Due to the catastrophic events of the Alien Wars, Damned City has now become a post-apocalyptic environment that is home to "all sorts of strange artifacts and tech". The harsh environment causes incurable psychic damage to the minds of human beings, driving them insane. The city has a mysterious gate that unleashes hideous Fiends, attacking anything that is alive.

Players assume the roles of four former military mercs, scrappers, and bounty hunters who are known as the Jaegers: Kaiser, a rebuilt cyborg from The Alien Wars; Ms. Harakiri, an assassin with a parasitic alien attached; The Gentleman, a well-cultured, highly intelligent alien bug; and Hungry Beast, a brilliantly scientific cyborg giant panda. Naturally immune to the mind-destroying effects of the city, the Jaegers are humanity's hope against the threat of the Fiends.

== Development ==
Contra: Rogue Corps was announced at E3 2019. The development of the game was overseen by veteran Contra series director and senior producer, Nobuya Nakazato, who also had been director, game designer, and artist of Contra III: The Alien Wars (1992) and Contra: Hard Corps (1994); and was producer and director of Contra: Shattered Soldier (2002) and more. Nakazato wanted to capture the traditional spirit of the Contra series, while modernizing it for a new audience.

== Reception ==
Reception

Aggregate scores
Aggregator	Score
Metacritic	NS: 40/100; PS4: 52/100; XONE: 56/100
OpenCritic	9% recommend

Review scores
Publication	Score
IGN	4/10
Nintendo Life	NS: 4/10
Push Square	5/10
PlayStation LifeStyle	PS4: 7.5/10

Contra: Rogue Corps received "mixed or average" reviews on the PlayStation 4 and Xbox One, and received "generally unfavorable" reviews on the Nintendo Switch, according to review aggregator Metacritic. Fellow review aggregator OpenCritic assessed that the game received weak approval, being recommended by only 9% of critics. Mitchell Saltzman of IGN attended the E3 2019 preview, initially feeling "some strong initial whiplash" from the dramatic departure from the series' history and the lack of nostalgia. With its "solid foundation" of gameplay, he found "a respectable twin-stick shooter with good gunplay and the potential for a great time with four-player couch co-op". He praised the way the game rewards a player's thoughtful strategies with a "smart and fun dynamic where you'll need to juggle your main and sub-weapon regularly".

Destructoid criticized the use of season pass downloadable content though "nothing of substance is being gated off", and noted that the overall reception by E3 attendees was "incredibly mixed". Nintendo Life criticized its controls, graphics, and "bland" mission structure—while praising its complex upgrade and customization system.

PlayStation LifeStyle's review of the game was more positive, stating that it "understands the appeal of revisiting gratuitous 90s cheese, but filters out all the tropes we’ve grown out of since. By injecting actual, creative humor instead of edgy cynicism or boring references, Contra: Rogue Corps really has a personality of its own despite most of the storytelling living in the background."
