= Contra ReBirth =

2009 video game

- Developer: M2
- Publisher: Konami
- Directors: Toshiyasu Kamiko; Yuji Yamanaka
- Producers: Nobuya Nakazato; Hirotaka Ishikawa
- Designer: Masato Misaki
- Writer: Kenichiro Kikuchi
- Composer: Manabu Namiki
- Series: Contra
- Platform: WiiWare
- Release: JP: May 12, 2009; PAL: September 4, 2009; NA: September 7, 2009
- Genre: Run and gun
- Modes: Single-player, multiplayer

Contra ReBirth (Note: Japanese: 魂斗羅リバース, Hepburn: Kontora Ribāsu) is a 2D run and gun video game developed by M2 and published by Konami for WiiWare. It is the twelfth original installment in the Contra series. It was released in Japan on May 12, 2009, the PAL region on September 4, 2009, and North America on September 7, 2009.

== Gameplay ==
An in-game screenshot of Contra ReBirth

Contra ReBirth retains the same sprite-based side-scrolling gameplay as the series' earlier installments. The game can be played with the standard Wii Remote, as well as with the Classic Controller or a Nintendo GameCube controller. As with most Contra games, up to two players can play simultaneously. The player initially has a choice between two different player characters: Bill Rizer, the traditional Contra hero, or Genbei Yagyu from Neo Contra. Two additional characters: Brownie (Tsugumin in the Japanese version), an android shaped like a small girl; and Plissken, a tall reptilian humanoid alien (whose name is a tribute to the Snake Plissken movie character), can also be selected once the player has completed the game on Easy (Brownie) and Normal (Plissken).

The dual weapon system from Contra III: The Alien Wars returns and the player's normal gun can now shoot in autofire once again. The power-ups in this installment consists of a Spread Shot, a Laser Gun and a Homing Gun. The traditional flamethrower, however, is missing. Playing on the Easy setting allows the player to always keep their current weapon after losing a life, a feature not available in any of the other settings, but locks the player out of the final boss stage and true ending, which usually occurs after all five main stages are completed.

== Plot ==
In 2633, the Neo-Salamander Force, led by their mysterious leader Chief Salamander, travel back to 1973 to take out the Contra force, when the Earth's defenses are considered by them as "primitive". They end up establishing a base on the ruins of the Shizuoka temple at the Yucatán Peninsula in Mexico. Bill Rizer and Genbei Yagyu, two members of the present-day Contra team, are deployed by the Galactic President to travel back in time to stop them. With the help of Brownie or Tsugumin (a miniature gynoid similar to Browny from Contra: Hard Corps) and Plissken (a reptilian alien) the Contra warriors manage to take down the Neo Salamander Force. However, Chief Salamander is nowhere to be seen. In the true ending of the game, it is revealed Chief Salamander is actually "Plissken", who has infiltrated the Contra unit under an assumed name.

== Audio ==
The game's soundtrack was composed by Manabu Namiki, who worked on the other titles in the ReBirth series. The music consists of remixes of previous Contra songs. The official album was released on March 24, 2010 in a compilation with Castlevania: The Adventure ReBirth's music.

== Reception ==
Reception

Aggregate scores
| Aggregator | Score |
|---|---|
| GameRankings | 76.67% |
| Metacritic | 76/100 |

Review scores
| Publication | Score |
|---|---|
| 1Up.com | B− |
| Destructoid | 7.5/10 |
| GamePro | 4.5/5 |
| GameRevolution | C+ |
| GameTrailers | 7.6/10 |
| Hardcore Gamer | 4.25/5 |
| IGN | 8.2/10 |
| Nintendo Life | 8/10 |
| Official Nintendo Magazine | 80% |
| Retro Gamer | 86% |
| Teletext GameCentral | 6/10 |

The game received "generally favorable reviews" according to the review aggregation website Metacritic.

The game was nominated for Game of the Year by Nintendo Power, as well as WiiWare Game of the Year and Best Action Game, but lost to Epic Mickey.

== See also ==
- Castlevania: The Adventure ReBirth
- Gradius ReBirth
