= Contra 4 =

2007 video game

- North American boxart
- Developer: WayForward Technologies
- Publisher: Konami
- Director: Matt Bozon
- Producers: William Oertel; Christopher Watson
- Designers: Michael Herbster; Michael Pace
- Programmer: Robert Koshak
- Artists: Henk Nieborg; Benjamin Badgett
- Writer: Cole Phillips
- Composer: Jake Kaufman
- Series: Contra
- Platforms: Nintendo DS, mobile phone, Windows Mobile, Android
- Release: Nintendo DS: NA: November 13, 2007; JP: March 13, 2008; Mobile phone November 19, 2007; Windows Mobile; August 4, 2009; Android; January 8, 2011
- Genre: Run and gun
- Modes: Single-player, multiplayer

Contra 4 (Note: Known in Japan as Contra Dual Spirits (Japanese: 魂斗羅 Dual Spirits)) is a run and gun video game developed by WayForward Technologies and published by Konami for the Nintendo DS. It is the eleventh overall installment of the Contra series, and was released in North America on November 13, 2007. A mobile port was released six days later on November 19, 2007. A rerelease, called Contra 4: Redux, was released for Android in 2011.

Contra 4 serves as a direct sequel to 1992's Contra III: The Alien Wars for the Super Nintendo Entertainment System, in celebration of the 20th anniversary of the franchise. It was also the first original game in the series to be released on a portable console since 1991's Operation C for the Game Boy.

Contra 4 received positive critical reception upon release, with critics hailing it as a return to form for the franchise.

== Plot ==
The plot is set two years after the events of Contra III: The Alien Wars and three years before the events of Contra: Hard Corps. Following the defeat of Red Falcon, a new entity called "Black Viper" begins launching attacks against the human race. Bill Rizer and Lance Bean are joined by Mad Dog and Scorpion as they travel to the fictional Galuga archipelago near New Zealand (the setting of the original arcade version of Contra) on a "final" strike mission.

The game's producers took a number of liberties with the established canon. In the North American versions, Black Viper was originally the name of the main antagonist in Operation C, while "Mad Dog" and "Scorpion" were the codenames of Bill and Lance.

== Gameplay ==
The cast of Contra 4. From left to right: Mad Dog, Bill Rizer, Lance Bean, and Scorpion

Contra 4 is based on the same 2D gameplay featured in the series through Contra III: The Alien Wars, ignoring many of the game mechanics introduced in later games, and returning to the old method of picking up power-up icons to obtain new weapons. The play controls are similar to Contra III, including the ability to hold two weapons in the player's inventory. The action spans both screens of the Nintendo DS system and a grappling hook can be used by the player's character to latch onto railings, allowing the player's character to move from one screen to the other. Similarly to the arcade version of Super Contra, the player can pick up the same power-up twice, giving them an improved version of the same weapon. The player can also discard a power-up, allowing them to try out a new weapon without losing a previous one.

In addition to the standard side view stages, there are also tunnel stages similar to the two "3D view" stages from the original Contra, in which the perspective shifts behind the character's back. The action in these stages is displayed solely on the upper screen, while the bottom screen is used to display the stage's map and the locations of power-ups. Other than using both screens, Contra 4 makes no usage of the DS' special features such as the touchscreen (besides navigating the main menu), microphone, or multiplayer modes.

=== Arcade Mode ===
Arcade Mode is the main portion of the game, which is composed of six standard stages and three tunnel stages, for a total of nine stages. The stages pay frequent homage to Contra, Super Contra (Super C on the NES), Operation C and Contra III: The Alien Wars. Three difficulty settings are available: Easy, Normal, and Hard. Easy is intended to be accessible to novices by providing the player with plenty of lives and credits, as well as making all power-ups upgraded by default, but does not give the player access to the final two stages nor the ending. Normal is a moderate setting described to be "as difficult as the original Contra", whereas Hard features faster-moving enemies and enemy fire, with fewer lives. Hard mode also features a different ending from Normal.

=== Challenge Mode ===
After completing the main game (Arcade Mode) once on any difficulty setting, a Challenge Mode will be made available in the main menu. This game mode is composed of forty different challenges in which the player must complete various tasks within the side-scrolling stages of Arcade Mode.

=== Music ===
The music and sound effects were handled by famed video game music remixer Jake Kaufman, who also composed for Shantae and founded the game music remix site VGMix. The soundtrack consists of a few arrangements of music from previous Contra games as well as new material. When Arcade Mode is played on the Hard setting, an arranged version of the Jungle theme from the original Contra is played instead of the standard stage music. The standard Jungle theme is actually an enhanced version of a "Contra style" chiptune song previously posted on Kaufman's website, called "Vile Red Falcon."

A soundtrack CD was announced by Konami to be bundled in the first print of the Japanese release of Contra: Dual Spirits, as a gift for preorders through the KonamiStyle shop. This deal was only available for Japanese residents. In addition to the music found in the game, a 4-minute live performance of the "Harbor" song is included as a bonus track. The song is performed by The Smash Bros, Jake Kaufman's video game tribute band.

== Reception ==
Reception

Aggregate score
Aggregator	Score
Metacritic	83/100

Review scores
Publication	Score
Destructoid	8/10
Electronic Gaming Monthly	7.83/10
Eurogamer	6/10
Famitsu	28/40
Game Informer	9.25/10
GameDaily	8/10
GamePro	4.5/5
GameRevolution	B+
GameSpot	8/10
GameSpy	4.5/5
GameTrailers	8.8/10
IGN	8/10
Nintendo Life	9/10
Nintendo Power	8.5/10
411Mania	8.7/10

The DS version received "favorable" reviews according to the review aggregation website Metacritic. In Japan, Famitsu gave it a score of all four sevens for a total of 28 out of 40.

The game was hailed as a "rebirth" of the franchise, and was praised for returning to its roots. GameZone gave the game 8.9 out of 10, saying, "Contra 4 presents some of the best, most hardcore run-and-gun shooting action on the DS, and is a breath of fresh, alien-blood-scented air for the system, and gaming in general." However, Edge gave it six out of ten, saying, "Is there any need, on vertically scrolling levels, for your character to die when they touch the bottom of the screen, despite the fact you know there are platforms there? Do bosses have to seem impossible, and then prove tedious when their patterns have been learned?"

The game had garnered multiple awards including IGN's "Best Action Game" and "Best Revival" of 2007, and GameSpy's 7th best DS game of 2007. In 2012, GamesRadar+ named it the 22nd best DS game of all time out of a list of 25.
