= Contra: Shattered Soldier =

2002 video game

- North American box art illustrated by Ashley Wood, portraying the protagonists Bill and Lucia
- Developer: Team Kijirushi (Note: Team Kijirushi was a group in Konami Computer Entertainment Tokyo.)
- Publisher: Konami
- Director: Nobuya Nakazato
- Producer: Nobuya Nakazato
- Composers: Akira Yamaoka; Sota Fujimori
- Series: Contra
- Platforms: PlayStation 2, PlayStation Network
- Release: PlayStation 2: NA: October 22, 2002; JP: November 14, 2002; EU: February 14, 2003; PlayStation Network: JP: July 25, 2012; NA: June 11, 2013
- Genre: Run and gun
- Modes: Single-player, multiplayer

Contra: Shattered Soldier (Note: Japanese: 真魂斗羅 Shin Kontora) is a video game that is part of the Contra series by Konami. It was developed by Team Kijirushi, a group of staff members within Konami Computer Entertainment Tokyo. The game marks a return to the two-dimensional gameplay style employed by the series prior to Contra: Legacy of War. A sequel to Contra: Hard Corps, the game was released for the PlayStation 2 in 2002 and for the PlayStation Network in both 2012 for Japan and 2013 for North America.

== Gameplay ==
The "hit rate" increases as the player demolishes scenery and enemies.

Shattered Soldier returns to the classic game system employed by the series prior to Contra: Legacy of War. The game is played entirely in 2D from a side-view perspective, but with fully polygonal graphics, although some segments in which the player rides a snowboard or a motorcycle are viewed from a front or rear-view perspective. The controls and abilities are similar to the ones featured in Contra III: The Alien Wars. In addition to being able to keep the character's mobility still while aiming and shooting, the player can also keep their character's aim still while moving as well (a feature that was introduced in C: The Contra Adventure and retroactively ported over to the Game Boy Advance version of Alien Wars).

The major departure in Shattered Soldier is the omission of power-up items. Instead, the player is equipped with one of three permanent weapons that can be switched at any point. Each weapon has a standard automatic shot and an alternate charge shot for a total of six types of shots. The standard shots are: a rapid-fire automatic machine gun (Heavy Machine Gun), a flamethrower (Flame Whip) and a grenade launcher (Diver Mines). The charged versions of the same weapons are: the Round Sweeper, which launches out a "gun pod" that sprays bullets in multiple directions; the Energy Shot, a large gunshot which delivers great damage; and a barrage of Homing Missiles that traces the nearest target.

Like Contra: Hard Corps, Shattered Soldier has multiple endings. However, the ending received now depends on player performance, rather than the path taken during the course of a game. The game introduces a "hit rate" system which gauges the number of enemies destroyed as a form of performance metric. Every unique target in each stage, whether it be an actual enemy or an object in the area, that is destroyed increases this ratio. A high hit-ratio, along with the minimization of lives lost and continues used, is essential to receive the better endings, and consequently unlock the additional extra features. The player can replay previously completed stages to achieve better grades before proceeding to the fifth stage (after that point, the player must play through the remaining set of stages continuously).

== Plot ==
In A.D. 2642, Earth remains scarred from previous alien conflicts as environmental problems grow beyond humanity's control. 80% of the planet's population was completely devastated by a malfunctioning hyper-magnetic weapons grid during development. Bill Rizer, the hero of the Alien Wars, was held responsible for the incident, as well as for murdering his partner, Lance Bean, who reportedly tried to stop him. He was given a sentence of 10,000 years in cryogenic prison.

However, five years later, in 2647, Earth faces another threat as the terrorist organization "Blood Falcon", led by a mysterious and superhuman commander, spreads panic over the world. The ruling government, referred to as the "Triumvirate", decides to release Bill Rizer prior to completing his sentence, in view of his previous successes in defending Earth, in hope of neutralizing Blood Falcon. Lucia, an advanced cyborg soldier built by the government from Dr. Geo Mandrake's research, is sent to accompany and assist Bill's endeavors. Bill eventually finds out that Lance is still alive and is in fact the commander of Blood Falcon himself.

After defeating Lance, it is revealed that the aliens from the past games attacked because the Triumvirate secretly stole a mysterious, powerful "Relic" from them. With this information, Bill and Lucia have to confront Triumvirate and uncover the secret of the alien Relic. The triumvirate are found hiding in Galuga archipelago, the original location of Bill Rizer and Lance's first mission. Bill and Lucia destroy the triumvirate after a brutal battle, and return to the city with a hero's welcome.

== Characters ==
- Bill Rizer - The Alien Wars hero and one of the two protagonists of earlier Contra games, Bill Rizer is brought back from his cryogenic prison, where he was located since he was framed for an accident with a malfunctioning hyper-magnetic weapon grid that killed 80% of Earth and with the accusation of murdering his old partner Lance.
- Lucia aka Bionoid LCR - A female cybernetic supersoldier and partner of Bill Rizer since she released him from his prison. She was originally planned by Dr. Geo Mandrake (from Contra: Hard Corps), but he was unable to finish her due to his death, so Lucia was developed later.
- Lance Bean - Bill's former partner and one of the two protagonists of earlier Contra games. Now, he has become the commander of "Blood Falcon" terrorist organization and has merged himself with an alien cell.
- Triumvirate - Three "hundreds-of-years-old" men who have prolonged their lives using cybernetic implants, which also combined their minds together. They are the high government of Earth in 2647 and they were the ones who framed Bill for the accident that killed four fifths of Earth's population and for the murder of Lance. Their names are Gaius, Nero, and Commodus.
- Relic of Moirai - A mysterious force that the alien attackers were trying to recover.

== Development ==
After commissioning Appaloosa Interactive for the development of Contra: Legacy of War and C: The Contra Adventure, Konami assigned their internal Konami Computer Entertainment Tokyo team to work on the next installment in the franchise. Nobuya Nakazato, (the director of Alien Wars and Hard Corps) was in charge of the game's direction, design and scenario. A few years prior to the announcement of Shattered Soldier, Konami had plans for a Nintendo 64 installment in the series titled Contra Spirits 64 that would've been handled by Konami Computer Entertainment Osaka, but those plans were aborted.

== Soundtrack ==
Shincontra Original Soundtrack

Soundtrack album
- Released: December 12, 2002
- Genre: Hard rock, techno, Industrial music
- Length: 63:16
- Language: Japanese
- Label: Konami Music Entertainment

The soundtrack was composed by Akira Yamaoka and Sota Fujimori. In 2002, Konami Music Entertainment released a printed album for it, catalog number KOLA-016. It is known that some tracks are missing or incomplete.

Track listing
No.	Title	Length
1.	"Venus"	01:37
2.	"Select Stage"	01:34
3.	"Fortress"	02:02
4.	"Intestines"	02:51
5.	"Stage Clear -Jingle-"	00:04
6.	"Mountains Area"	03:08
7.	"Battle Train"	02:48
8.	"Result"	01:06
9.	"Submarine Power Plant"	02:07
10.	"Senator"	01:46
11.	"Super-Power Robot Yokozuna Jr"	02:55
12.	"Relic of Moirai"	03:13
13.	"Destiny Confrontation"	02:20
14.	"The Crawler Tank"	02:29
15.	"Special Stage Clear -Jingle-"	00:06
16.	"Hell Drive"	02:33
17.	"The Dusk Gathers"	02:15
18.	"Islands"	02:03
19.	"Sky to the Ocean"	02:56
20.	"Jinmen-Gyo"	02:15
21.	"Slave Beast Taka"	01:40
22.	"Lance Lullaby"	00:57
23.	"Survival of the Fittest"	02:52
24.	"A True Last Boss"	02:38
25.	"Maximum Speed"	01:58
26.	"Critical Moment of Contra"	01:52
27.	"Game Over -Jingle-"	00:07
28.	"Recollections"	01:04
29.	"Dearest"	03:33
30.	"Risk"	01:19
31.	"S-Power"	01:30
32.	"Orion"	01:38
Total length:		63:16

== Reception ==
Reception

Aggregate score
Aggregator	Score
Metacritic	78/100

Review scores
Publication	Score
AllGame	4/5
Edge	6/10
Electronic Gaming Monthly	9/10, 9/10, 8/10
Eurogamer	4/10
Famitsu	30/40
Game Informer	8.25/10
GamePro	4.5/5
GameRevolution	B
GameSpot	7.6/10
GameSpy	3.5/5
GameZone	7.4/10
IGN	8/10
Official U.S. PlayStation Magazine	4.5/5
Entertainment Weekly	B+

Contra: Shattered Soldier received "generally favorable reviews" according to the review aggregation website Metacritic. In Japan, Famitsu gave it a score of 30 out of 40.
