= Simian Squared =

UK video game development company

Simian Squared Ltd
- Industry: Video Games, Entertainment
- Founder: Robert Cummings; Giuseppe Landolina
- Headquarters: London, England
- Key people: Robert Cummings; Giuseppe Landolina
- Products: Physynth; The Other Brothers
- Website: SimianSquared.com

Simian Squared Ltd, or Simian Squared (sometimes referred to as Simian 2) is a British video game developer based in London, England. The company was founded by brothers Robert Cummings and Giuseppe Landolina in 2011.

== The Other Brothers ==
Sigma's video game The Other Brothers was first announced by the company with footage of an alpha build in July 2012. The video gained 20,000 views within the first 24 hours on YouTube. The Other Brothers was released on 3 April 2013. It reached a No. 20 rating in iPhone apps overall in the United Kingdom, peaking at No. 16 in the App Store Games category there, and reaching No. 21 in the United States in the overall iPad apps chart.

The Other Brothers was made using the company's proprietary engine, Simian Tech. It is a collection of technologies built upon the Unity 3D engine. They designed (amongst other technologies) a "virtual Mode 7 chip" especially for the title.

== Past work ==
In December 2011, Simian Squared released Physynth, a virtual musical instrument for the Apple iPad. The app was well received with largely positive reviews and endorsements from musicians including multi-platinum artist Jordan Rudess of Dream Theater.

== Titles ==
Game title	Year released	Platform	Notes
The Other Brothers	2013	iOS, Consoles	Top-20 chart position
Physynth	2011	Apple iPad	First title by Simian Squared Ltd
