= Physynth =

Physynth is a musical synthesizer application for Apple iPad series, and was launched in December 2011. Physynth is notable for being the first synth to prioritise visuals as part of the experience, using 3D gaming technology such as shaders and nVidia PhysX to drive the physics. The user can adjust pan, volume, rotation of 'soundscapes' and instruments such as glockenspiel, drums, piano, and other unusual sound generating devices.

The software was developed by two brothers at Simian Squared as part of an ongoing effort to bring new experiences to app users and gamers alike by merging the two fields. Physynth was initially marketed as a serious synth. Since then, reviews have shown that apps and could use high end game rendering technologies.

The marketing campaign video was designed and shot by Film Creatives.
