= NHL Stanley Cup (video game) =

1993 video game

- North American cover art
- Developer: Sculptured Software
- Publisher: Nintendo
- Programmers: Peter Ward; Dean Ertel; Adam T. Clayton
- Composers: Paul Webb; Mark Ganus
- Platform: Super NES
- Release: NA: November 1993; EU: 1993
- Genre: Sports
- Modes: Single-player, multiplayer

NHL Stanley Cup, known as Super Hockey in Europe, is an ice hockey video game developed by Sculptured Software for the Super NES. Unlike most hockey video games of the time, the game features movement in a pseudo-3D environment using the SNES's Mode 7 hardware feature, similar to Sculptured's previous NCAA Basketball.

== Gameplay ==
A typical game of NHL Stanley Cup in action; with the Boston Bruins and the St. Louis Blues tied at zero goals.

Nintendo NHL Stanley Cup lets all 26 teams from the National Hockey League at the time of the game's release (including the expansion Florida Panthers and Mighty Ducks of Anaheim) compete for the highest honor in professional hockey, the Stanley Cup. As it licenses from the NHL, but not the NHLPA, the game can use the team logos and the Stanley Cup but not the names of real players. Despite this, the players have strengths and weaknesses that correspond to their real-life counterparts, so e.g. Pittsburgh Penguins #66 or Los Angeles Kings #99 have an easier time scoring. The player can substitute for or pull his goalie and institute line changes, but not line edits, as he sees fit. Gameplay modes consist of Exhibition, Season and Best of Seven Series. Options include three different period lengths (5, 10 or 20 minutes) and having the penalties and line changes turned on or off.

This game mimics real ice hockey in that the player can shoot, pass or dump the puck, and he can perform hip, shoulder and poke checks. The player can even fake a slap shot and aim his shot on goal to a particular corner of the net. There are numerous penalties that the player can commit, including tripping, cross checking, slashing, roughing, hooking, interference, icing and offsides. The player on offense could exploit a tactic of dumping the puck over the goalie's head, thereby creating an indefensible shot.

A special Mode 7 viewpoint gives the player a three-dimensional perspective that helps to keep him focused on the puck, the center ice and the surrounding action. Battery backup lets the player save the player's progress throughout the Stanley Cup playoffs. Other features include season and game statistics, three difficulty levels (Junior, NHL and NHL Pro), and the ability to skip games against particular opponents. At the end of each period and after the game, a sportscaster will give the player a summary of the action.
