= Contra (series) =

Video game series

- Logo as it appears in the 1987 Contra arcade video game
- Genres: Run and gun; Third-person shooter; Twin-stick shooter
- Developers: Konami; Appaloosa Interactive (1996-1998); WayForward Technologies (2007-2024); M2 (2009); Toylogic (2019)
- Publisher: Konami
- Platforms: Arcade, Commodore 64, Amstrad CPC, ZX Spectrum, IBM PC, NES, MSX2, Amiga, Game Boy, Game Boy Color, Super NES, Mega Drive/Genesis, Windows, PlayStation, Saturn, PlayStation 2, PlayStation Network, Game Boy Advance, Mobile, Xbox Live Arcade, Nintendo DS, Java 2 Platform, Micro Edition, WiiWare, Virtual Console, PlayStation 4, Xbox One, Nintendo Switch, PlayStation 5
- First release: Contra; February 20, 1987
- Latest release: Contra: Operation Galuga; March 12, 2024
- Spin-offs: Probotector, Hard Corps, Contra Force, Contra ReBirth

Contra (Note: In Japanese: 魂斗羅 (Kontora)) is a video game series produced by Konami composed primarily in the run and gun genre. The series debuted in February 1987 with the Japanese coin-operated arcade game of the same name, which has since spawned several sequels produced for various platforms.

The arcade version of Contra was released a few months after the Iran–Contra affair was made public. While it is unclear whether the game was deliberately named after the Nicaraguan Contra rebels, the ending theme of the original game was titled "Sandinista" (サンディニスタ, Sandinisuta), after the adversaries of the real-life Contras.

== Gameplay ==
The majority of the Contra games are side-scrolling run and gun video games where the player takes control of an armed commando who must fight all sorts of extraterrestrial monsters and other kinds of futuristic menaces. In addition to the side-scrolling stages, the original Contra (among others) also features "pseudo-3D perspective" levels where the player must move towards the background in order to progress, while subsequent titles, such as Super Contra and Contra III: The Alien Wars, feature overhead stages as well. Only the Appaloosa-developed installments in the series, Contra: Legacy of War and C: The Contra Adventure, as well as Neo Contra, deviated from the series' mainly side-scrolling perspective (although C: The Contra Adventure does feature two side-scrolling stages). Contra: Shattered Soldier, while maintaining the side-view perspective of the 2D games, features fully polygonal 3D graphics. Almost every game in the series, with only a few exceptions (such as the MSX2 version of Contra, C: The Contra Adventure or Operation C for the Game Boy, which were single-player only), allows two players to play the game simultaneously.

The main power-ups in the series are falcon-shaped letter icons which will replace the player's default weapon with a new one, such as a Laser Gun or a Spread Gun. There are also power-ups that are actually auxiliary items like the Barrier (which provides temporary invincibility) or the Rapid Bullets (which increases the firing speed of the player's current weapon) in the original Contra, as well as weapons such as the Mega Shell in the arcade version of Super Contra and the Bombs in Contra III and Contra: Hard Corps, that are used to destroy all on-screen enemies. The original arcade version of Contra used the falcon icons for all of its weapons except the Laser Gun and the Fire Ball weapon, while in the arcade version of Super Contra, no Falcon icons were used. Contra: Shattered Soldier and Neo Contra both deviate from this tradition by having set weapon configurations instead.

Most of the Contra games have the player begin the game with only a set number of lives (three in most console games). If the player gets hit once, they will lose a life along with any weapon they currently possess in some games. Because of this, the Contra series is notorious for being extremely difficult. Even in the original arcade versions, most of the games only give limited chances to continue before forcing the player to start all over. Extra lives are usually obtained in most games when the player reaches certain scores. The NES version of the original Contra used the Konami Code (previously featured in the NES version of Gradius) to start the game with thirty lives instead of the usual three. Most of the subsequent console games in the series only featured these extra lives codes in their Japanese releases, such as Contra Spirits (the Japanese version of Contra III) and Contra: Hard Corps.

== Games ==
Release timeline
1987	Contra
1987	Super Contra
1988
1989
1990
1991	Operation C
1992	Contra III: The Alien Wars
1992	Contra Force
1993
1994	Contra: Hard Corps
1995
1996	Contra: Legacy of War
1997
1998	C: The Contra Adventure
1999
2000
2001
2002	Contra: Shattered Soldier
2003
2004	Neo Contra
2005
2006
2007	Contra 4
2008
2009	Contra ReBirth
2010
2011	Hard Corps: Uprising
2012
2013
2014
2015
2016
2017
2018
2019	Contra: Rogue Corps
2020
2021
2022
2023
2024	Contra: Operation Galuga

=== Main games ===
- Contra (Arcade, NES, MSX2, DOS, C64, CPC, ZX) (1987)
  Contra is the first game in the series. Many of the series' conventions such as power-ups, two-player cooperative gameplay and the character's light mobility (including somersaults) were already present in this game. The game is composed of traditional side-view stages that scroll either vertically or horizontally, as well as "3D view" stages in which the player moves towards the backgrounds. The NES version is different from the arcade version and has longer stages and numerous other modifications. In Japan, the Famicom version uses the VRC2 chip, which allowed for additional background animation and cut-scenes not included in its North American and European NES counterparts. An MSX2 version was also produced that is drastically different from the other two versions, made by Konami staff members, but not by the original team who made the original Arcade. Several computer versions were done outside Japan, by Ocean in Europe for the C64, CPC and ZX, and by Banana Software in North America for DOS based PCs.
- Super Contra (Arcade, NES, DOS, Amiga) (1987)
  Super Contra replaces the 3D view stages from the original with top-view stages similar to those in Commando or Ikari Warriors. Features unique to the arcade version includes upgradable weapons and the ability to control the character's jumping height. The NES version (retitled Super C for its North American version) has three new stages and a new final boss, but lacks the upgradable weapons from the arcade game. Unlimited Software created DOS and Amiga conversions for the North American market, based on the arcade original.
- Contra III: The Alien Wars (SNES, Game Boy, Game Boy Advance) (1992)
  The series' first entry for a 16-bit game console, Contra III allows the player's character to climb into walls or railings and carry two weapons that can be switched back and forth, as well as smart bombs that kill all on-screen enemies. Many of the stages and bosses made use of the system's Mode 7 graphic effects, including a bike riding stage that ends in a midair battle with the main character riding missiles. The player is now required to rotate their character in the top-view stages to move along with the scenery. Two heavily modified portable ports were produced; a port for the original Game Boy, simply titled Contra: The Alien Wars; and a later Game Boy Advance port, titled Contra Advance: The Alien Wars EX, which replaced the top view stages with levels from Contra: Hard Corps.
- Contra: Hard Corps (Mega Drive/Genesis) (1994)
  The first Contra game for a Sega platform. Hard Corps also contains selectable characters with unique weapons and abilities and introduces an in-game storyline with branching paths that alter the ending.
- Contra: Shattered Soldier (PlayStation 2) (2002)
  Features 2D side-scrolling gameplay with fully polygonal 3D graphics. The player now has a fixed weapon configuration, allowing the character to use one of three weapons. The player can also charge their weapon for a more powerful shot. The game grades the player's performance on each stage and only allows the good ending to those with an above-average rank.
- Neo Contra (PlayStation 2) (2004)
  Most of the game is played in an isometric perspective, but portions are side-scrolling or overhead-behind. The player can now select their weapon configurations, which includes a weapon that locks onto airborne enemies.
- Contra 4 (Nintendo DS) (2007)
  Developed by WayForward Technologies, the gameplay is displayed on two screens and the player's character now has a grappling hook that latches onto railings. The gameplay system is modeled after Contra III: The Alien Wars, with upgradable weapons similar to Super Contra. It also features the return of the 3D view "tunnel" stages from the original Contra. The game has never been released in Europe.
- Contra: Operation Galuga (Nintendo Switch, PlayStation 4, PlayStation 5, Windows, Xbox One, Xbox Series X/S), released on March 12, 2024.
  A remake of the original game developed by WayForward.

==== Spin-offs ====
- Operation C (Game Boy) (1991)
  Operation C is the first Contra game made specifically for a portable platform. Featuring gameplay similar to the NES version of Super C, Operation C also first introduced the "homing gun" power-up.
- Contra Force (NES) (1992)
  Contra Force combines the run and gun style of the Contra series with a power-up system similar to Gradius. The game is notable for being the first Contra to feature selectable characters with their unique weapon configurations. Contra Force lacks the alien invaders and futuristic environment of previous installments, as the game centers around an elite task force fighting human terrorists in a present-day setting. The game was actually planned as an unrelated game in Japan titled Arc Hound, but it was never officially released there, nor in Europe.
- Contra: Legacy of War (PlayStation, Sega Saturn) (1996)
  The first of two Contra titles developed by Appaloosa Interactive, as well as the first attempt to convert the Contra gameplay to 3D and the first game in the series to be played in an isometric perspective. It was originally sold with a pair of anaglyph glasses. It is the first console Contra game to be released in the PAL region with no changes. A Japanese release of Legacy of War was planned, but canceled.
- C: The Contra Adventure (PlayStation) (1998)
  The second Contra game developed by Appaloosa. The gameplay is composed of several side-scrolling and 3D stages, as well as a single overhead stage. It's the only console game in the series to lack a multiplayer mode. C: The Contra Adventure was only released in North America, with no Japanese or European versions.
- Contra ReBirth (downloadable for Wii) (2009)
  Developed by M2 and published by Konami for WiiWare, this 2D side-scrolling game was released in May 2009 in Japan and features Bill Rizer and Genbei Yagyu from Neo Contra fighting off an alien invasion. It features hand-drawn sprite-based visuals, and has two unlockable characters as well as an unlockable "nightmare mode." The Nintendo Wii Shop Channel closed in 2019, thus the game is no longer available for purchase.
- Hard Corps: Uprising (downloadable for PlayStation 3, Xbox 360) (2011)
  The game was developed by Arc System Works and is the first Contra game without the Contra name in the title. It became available on Xbox Live Arcade on February 16, 2011, and was released on the PlayStation Network on March 15, 2011. It is a prequel to the original Contra. The player plays as Colonel Bahamut, the main antagonist from Contra: Hard Corps. Although the game was released with only two different characters to choose from, Konami has released additional characters via DLC.
- Contra: Rogue Corps (Nintendo Switch, PlayStation 4, Windows, Xbox One) (2019)
  Developed by Toylogic and published by Konami, Contra: Rogue Corps is a top-down isometric view run and gun game taking place years after Contra III: The Alien Wars, which was released on September 24, 2019.

==== Other games ====
Spin-offs exclusive to mobile gaming platforms among other mediums.

- Contra: The War of the Worlds (mobile) (2009)
  A mobile game developed by Konami's Chinese division. In this game, the player fights alien intruders on the Moon.
- Contra: Evolution (Arcade, Android, iPhone, iPad) (2010)
  A remake of the original Contra which was released in China on mobile phones (2010), based on an arcade version that would actually be released later (2011) and later ported to iOS systems in 2013. It features updated graphics, new characters to choose from, pay-to-play credits to buy extra lives, and bonus stage
- Contra 3D (Pachislot)
  Contra 3D is a pachislot game based on the Contra series which was released in Japan in 2013.
- Neo Contra (Slot Machine) (Pachislot)
  Neo Contra (Slot Machine) is a Slot Machine game based on Neo Contra which was released in North America in 2014.
- Neo Contra: Warrior Reloaded (Pachislot)
  Neo Contra: Warrior Reloaded is another slot machine game based on Neo Contra, released in 2016.
- Neo Contra: Samurai Strike (Pachislot)
  Neo Contra: Samurai Strike is another slot machine game based on Neo Contra, released in 2016.
- Contra Returns (mobile)
  A free-to-play mobile game developed by Tencent and Konami which was originally exclusive to China in 2017. At the time of the Chinese release, it was nominated for "Best Sound Design in a Casual/Social Game" and "Best Music in a Casual/Social Game" at the 16th Annual Game Audio Network Guild Awards.
- Contra Burst (arcade) released 2025.

=== Re-releases ===
The original arcade versions of Contra and Super Contra were ported to several computer platforms in North America and Europe during the late 1980s and 1990s. In North America, the original Contra and Super Contra (as Super C) were ported to DOS. A version of Super C was also released for the Amiga. Contra was released for DOS, the Amstrad CPC, the Commodore 64 and the ZX Spectrum in Europe under the Gryzor title.

As software emulation became more widespread, the games would be re-released in numerous formats on several platforms, most notable through the Wii's Virtual Console, the Xbox Live Arcade, and the PlayStation Network.

=== Cancelled games ===
- Contra Spirits 64 (Nintendo 64)
  Originally announced in early 1997, this Nintendo 64 incarnation of the series was to be developed by Konami Computer Entertainment Osaka, but was later cancelled when the development team disbanded.
- Contra (GameCube)
  In 2002, a European division of Konami announced its development. When nothing else turned up beyond this, a response from Konami basically summed up its cancellation.
- Contra Online (PlayStation 2, Xbox and PC)
- Contra 3DS (Nintendo 3DS)

=== In other video games ===
- Battlantis (Arcade) - Emperor Demon Gyaba appears as a major alien boss in a stage.
- Konami Wai Wai World (Family Computer, Cell Phone) - although released a month before the Famicom version of Contra, the final boss theme in the game is the same one used in the original Contra.
- Wai Wai World 2: SOS!! Parsley Jō (Family Computer, Wii U VC) - Bill Rizer appears as a playable character among other Konami characters.
- Snatcher - in the English-language Mega-CD/Sega CD version, two characters masquerading as Bill and Lance appear at a Konami-themed costume party held in the Outer Heaven show pub. They are replaced by Light and Pastel from the TwinBee series in the PlayStation and Sega Saturn versions. However, in these versions, an ad for a Contra film is shown on a large monitor on a building in the Altamila (Alton Plaza) shopping center.
- TwinBee PARADISE in Donburi Shima (PC) - Sheena, Brad Fang and Ray Poward from Contra: Hard Corps make a brief cameo in Wai Wai Arcade.
- Nano Breaker (PlayStation 2) - Jaguar from Neo Contra appears as a hidden character.
- Power Pro Kun Pocket 8 (Nintendo DS) - one of the minigames is a Contra parody.
- Silent Hill: Shattered Memories - late in the game, the player explores a movie theater which features several Konami arcade machines in the lobby, including the original Contra.
- Rocket Knight - the ending, when playing as Gold Sparkster, features Bill Rizer shooting the Spread Gun at Gold Sparkster as he flies across the sky while saying his trademark line, "It's time for revenge".
- Project X Zone 2 (Nintendo 3DS) - One of Xiaomu's counterattack quotes is the opening lines from Contra III: The Alien Wars.
- In May 2024, the Operation Guns downloadable content for Vampire Survivors was released, which adds playable characters, weapons, environments, and music from the Contra series.
- Wai Wai World Craft (iOS, Android, PC, TBA)
- Picross S: Konami Antiques Edition (Nintendo Switch) - An Nonogram video game was included based off on Konami titles, include the Contra series.

=== In other media ===
- In Warera Hobby's Famicom Seminar, published by Jump Comics from 1988 to 1991, the boy was playing on Famicom version of Contra, as Bill Rizer and Ledder makes cameo in the chapter 26.
- In the 1989 film The Wizard, during Jimmy's Training, Contra is shown as one of the games he plays.
- In the comic strip of Howard & Nester from Nintendo Power issue 14 (1990), Howard and Nester meet Bill Rizer and Lance Bean and help them get through Base Area 4 in Super C.
- In Rock'n Game Boy, published by Comic BomBom from 1989 to 1991, Operation C is basis of the chapter 14 from the manga.
- Best Student Council - in the Konami-produced anime television series, Pucchan's other hand puppet friend in episode 19 is named after Lance Bean, a nod to the Contra character.
- Robot Chicken - an episode called "Catch Me If You Kangaroo Jack" spoofed the Contra video game segment.
- One of the video game characters in episode 2 from Spaceballs: The Animated Series, resembles Bill and Lance from Contra. While talking about Raccoon City, he is killed with a gunshot to the head by a character resembling Agent 47.

== Plot ==
=== Storyline and protagonists ===
Contra, and its initial sequels, are set in the 27th century, and center around two commandos named Bill Rizer (code name Mad Dog) and Lance Bean (code name Scorpion). They are members of a special guerrilla task force codenamed "Contra", who are sent to thwart armies of alien invaders seeking to destroy the Earth. After Contra III: The Alien Wars, the series would deviate from its original premise.

Contra: Hard Corps and its sequels (Legacy of War and C The Contra Adventure) take place after the events of Contra III, and followed several new characters; namely, recurring protagonist Ray Poward. Additionally, Hard Corps would feature human antagonists, rather than aliens. 2011's Hard Corps: Uprising is a prequel to Hard Corps, and is also set twenty years before the events of the original Contra. The game follows a character named "Bahamut", but in an interview with Siliconera, producer Kenji Yamamoto comments that Bahamut may or may not be the same character from the original Hard Corps. Yamamoto would also reveal the reason why the game doesn't use the Contra name in its title was due to how "different" fans regarded Hard Corps from the rest of the series. Hard Corps and its follow ups have since been considered to be spin-offs from the main series.

Bill would not return until 2002's Contra: Shattered Soldier; where he became a convicted war criminal sent to fight against his former partner, Lance, who has become a terrorist leader. In the game's sequel, Neo Contra, a cryogenically frozen Bill is ultimately revealed to be a clone of the original Bill Rizer.

Contra 4 was intended to be a direct sequel to Contra III, ignoring the events of previous installments. However, "Mad Dog" and "Scorpion", originally the nicknames given to Bill and Lance in the NES versions of Contra and Super C, were made into separate characters. The game's main antagonist, "Black Viper", is also treated as a new character, despite originally appearing in the North American version of Operation C (which also refers to protagonist Lance as "Scorpion"). On the official timeline seen in the "History of Contra" e-book included with the Contra Anniversary Collection, the game is chronology set after the Japanese versions of Operation C and Contra III, but before the events of Hard Corps.

Contra: Rogue Corps would return to the post-Contra III setting. The game features the return of Kaiser from the latter game, who joins a group of bounty hunters in a place called the "Damned City".

=== Continuity differences ===
While the original Japanese version of the early Contra games (specifically Contra, Super Contra and Operation C) were set in the 27th century (in the years 2633, 2634, and 2635 in that order), the American versions of these games omitted this detail and the instruction manuals for these versions implied that the series was set during the present day. Contra III: The Alien Wars retains its futuristic setting of 2636 for its American release, but the identities of the two player characters, Bill Rizer and Lance Bean (the heroes from the previous installments), were changed to their descendants "Jimbo" and "Sully" in order to retain the continuity of the previous localizations.

The enemy characters of the earlier games were also named differently in the American versions. In particular, "Red Falcon", originally the name of the terrorist army that was fought by the main characters in the first game (the Red Falcon Organization), became the name of the actual alien entity leader; thus, "Red Falcon" became the name of the final boss fought at the end of Contra, where the player fights both his alien body form and his heart. In Japan, these are intended to be two different entities: Emperor Demon Dragon God Java and Emperor Demon Evil Heart Gomera Mosking, respectively.

The final boss of Super Contra (or the third to last boss in the NES Super C) and Contra III; is named Emperor Demon Gyaba in the original Japanese versions. Often mistaken as Red Falcon, his American name is referred to as Jagger Froid in the Super C instruction manual. The American Super C instruction manual also illustrates a common "running" alien enemy from its final stage as Red Falcon. The alien entity leader known as Red Falcon does not appear as an enemy in the Super Contra or Super C games.

In the Japanese version of Operation C, the antagonist was originally a nameless hostile nation seeking to develop alien-based weapons. This was changed in the North American version to "Black Viper", another alien invader.

With the release of the American and European versions of Contra: Shattered Soldier, all international Contra releases began to follow the Japanese continuity.

=== Alternate continuities ===
Contra Force is a standalone entry that, due to it being originally intended to be separate game altogether, is considered to be non-canon from the rest of the franchise.

Contra ReBirth begins in 2633, but the game's plot primarily takes place in 1973 and incorporates elements of time travel. It has since been considered non-canon, instead taking place in an alternate timeline during a period dubbed "the KONTRA era".

Contra: Operation Galuga is a reimagining of the original game and a reboot of the series set in 26XX as opposed to the original taking place in 2633. Bill Rizer and Lance Bean also once again return as the main protagonists.

=== Probotector ===
When Konami released the NES version of the original Contra in the PAL region (Europe and Australia) they modified the game by replacing the original main characters and most of the human enemies with robotic counterparts, retitling the game Probotector (a portmanteau of "Robot" and "Protector"). The title referred to the two robotic soldiers, RD-008 and RC-011, who replaced Bill and Lance in this version. This was presumably done due to the German Federal Agency BPjM, which prohibited the sale and advertisement of media deemed too violent to children, including "content which glorifies war".

While the original arcade games, as well as a few computer conversions under the Gryzor title, were released unchanged in Europe, subsequent console installments of the Contra series were released under the Probotector title in Europe. The original Probotector was followed by Probotector II: Return of the Evil Forces for the NES (originally Super Contra or Super C) and Super Probotector: Alien Rebels for the SNES (Contra III: The Alien Wars). The Contra games for the Game Boy (Operation C and the Game Boy version of Alien Wars) and Mega Drive (Contra: Hard Corps) were also released as Probotector titles in Europe. The series would revert to the Contra title in Europe beginning with Contra: Legacy of War for the PlayStation, retaining the human characters. However, Probotector II and Super Probotector were still released for the Wii Virtual Console in Europe and Australia like their original releases, with no "uncensored" versions available. Although Contra 4 was not released in Europe, the "Probotector" character appears in the game as a hidden character.

== Reception ==
By the end of 1996, the Contra series had accumulated combined sales of over 4 million units worldwide.
