= Neo Contra =

2004 video game

- North American and European box art illustrated by comic book artist Jim Lee
- Developer: Team Neo Kijirushi (Note: Team Neo Kijirushi was a group in Konami Computer Entertainment Tokyo.)
- Publisher: Konami
- Director: Takayuki Ando
- Producer: Nobuya Nakazato
- Artists: Jim Lee (US & PAL cover art)
- Composer: Sota Fujimori
- Series: Contra
- Platforms: PlayStation 2, PlayStation Network
- Release: PlayStation 2: NA: October 19, 2004; JP: November 4, 2004; EU: February 25, 2005; PlayStation Network: EU: February 15, 2012; JP: September 19, 2012; NA: February 18, 2014
- Genre: Run and gun
- Modes: Single-player, multiplayer

Neo Contra (ネオコントラ, Neo Kontora) is the tenth video game in the Contra series published by Konami. It was developed by Team Neo Kijirushi, a group of staff members within Konami Computer Entertainment Tokyo, and released for the PlayStation 2 in 2004. The game is a direct follow-up to Contra: Shattered Soldier, but returns to the multidirectional shooting format and departs from the traditional scrolling shooter formula used in previous games. It was the first game in the series to receive an M (Mature) rating from the ESRB and was the only installment to receive this rating until the release of Rogue Corps in 2019.

== Gameplay ==
Neo Contra returns the series once again to three-dimensional gameplay. However, unlike the titles developed under Appaloosa Interactive, players only need to aim in the third dimension on rare occasions. Additionally, this title moves away from the boss-oriented gameplay of Hard Corps and previous 32-bit titles in favor of longer free-form shooting sequences that are interspliced with boss encounters; in this regard, it is more reminiscent of the 8-bit and SNES Contra games.

Additionally, gameplay varies depending on the level and camera angle presented (the camera cannot be user-controlled). Most of the game is played from an isometric perspective, although some portions are side-scrolling or overhead-behind. The player cannot jump; instead, two new defensive moves, dash and spin, allow for the player to effectively evade enemies in the new dimensions. Dash gives the player a quick burst of speed to evade hostiles, while spin provides the player with brief invulnerability. The hit-ratio system introduced in Shattered Soldier has been kept in this title.

The game uses a modified version of the three-weapon configuration from Shattered Soldier. The player has two types of firearms to use against ground-level targets; one with regular ammo, and another with flammable rounds, plus a third weapon used to lock on to airborne targets. The player can choose from one of the three initially available weapon sets (one of which includes the famous Spread Shot from the earlier Contra games, which was missing in Shattered Soldier), with four additional sets that are time-release. The Type F configuration features the GV Laser and Ripple Laser, both weapons from Gradius V.

The weapon sets can be variated from the weaponry depending on the character used since Katana Jaguar uses his katana sword in all his sets.

Sets available are:

- Type A: Machine Gun, Grenade Launcher, and Lock-On Missile.
- Type B: Charge Shot, Fire Whip. and Lock-On Laser.
- Type C: Spread Shot, Fireball. and Lock-On Thunder.
- Type D: Lightning, G.Bazooka, and Heaven Laser.
- Type E: Drill Shot, Reflect Laser, and Fairy Laser.
- Type F: Ripple Laser, GV Laser, and Variable Weapon.

There are a total of seven stages in the game. Like Shattered Soldier, the four initial stages can be played in any order and can be replayed anytime for higher grading. The fifth stage can only be selected after clearing the first four stages, while the sixth and seventh stages are only available if players maintain an above-average grade overall. There is a difficulty setting in the options menu, and playing on Easy difficulty grants players 30 lives to beat the first four missions, but on this difficulty, it is impossible to view the game's ending. Normal mode offers players 5 lives and 7 continues to complete the game's seven missions.

Neo Contra also bring back the time limit, a feature originating from some versions of the original Contra games. In Neo Contra, the time limit is imposed during the last third of the sixth stage. Unlike the timed missions in the original Contra where the player loses one life once the time limit drops to zero, in Neo Contra, the entire game is over if the player is unable to complete the last part of the sixth stage within the time limit.

== Plot ==
Neo Contra takes place in the year 4444 A.D., when the Earth has been transformed into a prison planet, home to criminals and political rebels. From this underworld society rises a new order called "Neo Contra". This new government quickly shows its true colors, as it has plans other than restoring normal civilization. Executing these nefarious plans are four renegade Contras (elite warriors), who are called the Four Elite, united under the command of the mysterious Master Contra. Thus, Bill Rizer is partnered with Genbei "Jaguar" Yagyu, a samurai, and the two are sent to Earth to deal with the Neo Contra threat. After defeating the Four Elite, the heroes discover the truth behind "Neo Contra", which is a facade for "Project C", a plan to create a half-human AI from Bill Rizer's DNA, as an ultimate weapon, which is now embodied in Master Contra. Bill Rizer himself is revealed to be only a clone of the original Bill Rizer, a side-objective of "Project C". With the help of Mystery G, an elder Contra operative, the heroes manage to defeat Master Contra and put an end to "Project C".

== Characters ==
- Bill Rizer – Bill, the supreme Contra warrior, is once again awoken from his cryogenic sleep of nearly two thousand years. He is now ordered to destroy the "Neo Contra" threat, a new organization that poses a much deeper threat to the world. He is, in fact, a clone of the original Bill Rizer, a result of the government's "Project C".
- Genbei "Jaguar" Yagyu – A samurai Contra, who is Bill's new partner. A mysterious dark-skinned humanoid alien (or African American) in the forty-fifth century who follows the code of the Samurai. He is the only character able to wield the Katana, the most powerful weapon in the game. The character is based on the real-life black samurai Yasuke from the Sengoku period of Feudal Japan history.
- The Four Hell Warriors of Neo Contra – The four elite members of the "Neo Contra" organization:
  - Guerilla Contra: the pipe-smoking military commander.
  - Plant Contra: the plant/cyborg hybrid.
  - Pheromone Contra: Lucia (aka Bionoid LCR), who once assisted Bill during the events of Contra: Shattered Soldier.
  - Animal Contra: the talking Bull Terrier.
- Mystery G – A mysterious elderly Contra operative. While not openly confirmed in the game, it is acknowledged that Mystery G is the actual Bill Rizer, having survived for centuries.
- Master Contra – The leader of "Neo Contra" and a threat to humanity. He is, in fact, the main result of "Project C": the ultimate war machine, a bionic AI, which consists of the original Bill Rizer's DNA and consciousness combined with cybernetics and weapons of mass destruction.

== Reception ==
Reception

Aggregate score
Aggregator	Score
Metacritic	65/100

Review scores
Publication	Score
Electronic Gaming Monthly	7.33/10
Famitsu	29/40
Game Informer	7.75/10
GamePro	4/5 stars
GameSpot	6.8/10
GameSpy	3.5/5 stars
GameZone	7.2/10
IGN	7/10
Official U.S. PlayStation Magazine	3.5/5 stars
X-Play	2/5 stars
Detroit Free Press	2/4 stars

The game received "mixed" reviews according to the review aggregation website Metacritic. In Japan, Famitsu gave it a score of 29 out of 40.
