= NCAA Basketball (video game) =

1992 video game

- North American cover art
- Developer: Sculptured Software
- Publishers: JP: HAL Laboratory; NA/EU: Nintendo
- Directors: Adam Flick; Tim Rooney
- Designer: Hal Rushton
- Programmer: Adam Clayton
- Composers: H. Kingsley Thurber; Paul Webb; Mark Ganus
- Platform: Super NES
- Release: JP: June 26, 1992
- Genre: Traditional basketball simulation
- Modes: Single-player, multiplayer

NCAA Basketball, (Note: Known in Japan as Super Dunk Shot.) known in Europe as World League Basketball, is a basketball video game developed by Sculptured Software for the Super NES.

It was the first basketball game for a console to use a 3D perspective. The game uses the Super Nintendo's Mode 7 to create a 3D player's-eye view that became the standard for later basketball video games. Sculptured Software's NHL Stanley Cup featured a similar effect.

According to the short-lived American magazine Flux, this video game was ranked the 75th-best video game of all time.

== Gameplay ==
In the game, the player chooses a basketball team and then plays against either a computer or a human opponent on a court. The goal is to score the most baskets within the given time through dribbling and passing. Players can also save the game and change options and difficulty settings.

The game allows the player to play either an exhibition game or a full season.

The North American version of the game contains college teams from five major NCAA Division I-A conferences (ACC, Big East, Big 8, SEC, and SWC) but with fictional players, while the European version features fictional professional teams located throughout the world, and the Japanese release features its own fictionalized likenesses of NBA teams.

== Reception ==
Reception

Review scores
Publication	Score
Consoles +	88%
Computer and Video Games	88/100
Player One	96%
Super Play Gold	84%

Entertainment Weekly wrote that "while most video basketball games play like most other video basketball games, this Nintendo effort sets itself apart with a unique, rotating 3-D perspective." Nintendo Power ranked NCAA Basketball the ninth-best SNES game of 1992.
