= Mode 7 =

Graphics mode on the Super NES video game console

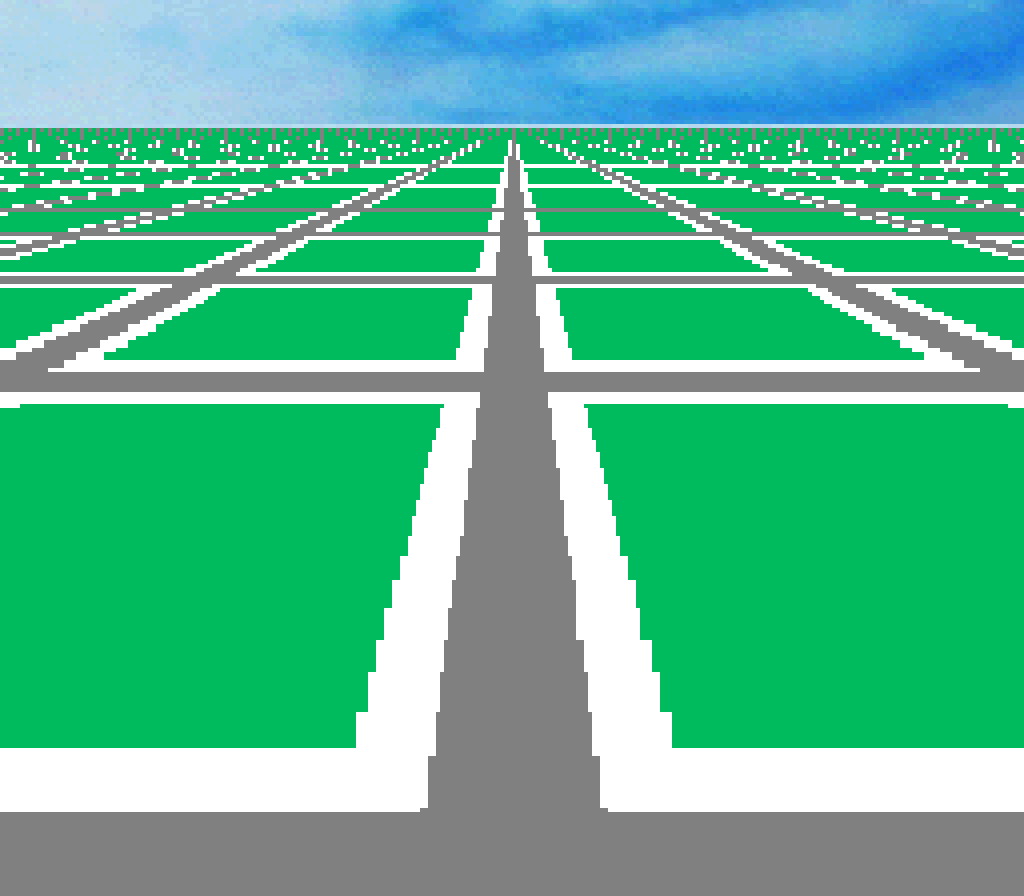
Figure 1. This basic Super NES demo uses Mode 7 for a faux 3D perspective view.

Mode 7 is a graphics mode on the Super Nintendo Entertainment System (Super NES) video game console that allows a background layer to be rotated and scaled, which may be done on a scanline-by-scanline basis to create many different depth effects. It also supports wrapping effects such as translation and reflection.

The most famous of these effects is the application of a perspective effect (Figure 1) on a background layer by adjusting the layer's scale each scanline. This transforms the background layer into a two-dimensional (2D) horizontal texture-mapped plane that trades height for depth, achieving an impression of three-dimensional (3D) graphics.

Mode 7 was one of Nintendo's prominent selling points for the Super NES platform in publications such as Nintendo Power and Super NES Player's Guide. Similar faux 3D techniques have been presented on a few 2D systems other than the Super NES, in select peripherals and games.

== Overview ==
The Super NES console has eight graphics modes, numbered from 0 to 7, for displaying background layers. The last one ("BG Mode-7") has a single layer that can be scaled and rotated. 2D affine transformations can produce any combination of translation, scaling, reflection, rotation, and shearing. However, many games create additional effects by setting a different transformation matrix for each scanline. In this way, pseudo-perspective, curved surface, and distortion effects can be achieved.

Mode 7 graphics are generated for each pixel by mapping screen coordinates $x$ and $y$ (which together form the vector $\mathbf{r}$) to background layer coordinates $x^\prime$ and $y^\prime$ (the vector $\mathbf{r}^\prime$) using an affine transformation and sampling the corresponding background color at $\mathbf{r}^\prime$ without interpolation. The 2D affine transformation is specified for each scanline by 6 parameters: $a$, $b$, $c$, and $d$ (which together define the matrix $\mathbf{M}$), and $x_0$ and $y_0$ (which define the origin vector $\mathbf{r}_0$).

The following matrix equation compactly represents that the 2D screen coordinate vector $\mathbf{r}$ is translated to the origin coordinate system, the affine transform matrix is applied, and the result is translated back to the original coordinate system to obtain the background layer coordinate vector $\mathbf{r}^\prime$:

$$\begin{aligned}
\mathbf{r}^\prime &= \mathbf{M} (\mathbf{r} - \mathbf{r}_0) + \mathbf{r}_0
\\
\begin{bmatrix} x' \\ y' \end{bmatrix}
&=
\begin{bmatrix} a & b \\ c & d \end{bmatrix}
\left(
\begin{bmatrix} x \\ y \end{bmatrix}
- \begin{bmatrix} x_0 \\ y_0 \end{bmatrix}
\right)
+ \begin{bmatrix} x_0 \\ y_0 \end{bmatrix} .
\end{aligned}$$

All arithmetic is carried out on 16-bit signed fixed point numbers, while all offsets are limited to 13 bits. The radix point is between bits 7 and 8.

Note: the Game Boy Advance's background mode 1 and 2 also perform hardware affine transformations to create effects like Mode 7, and a 3D faux perspective can be simulated using trigonometry to calculate the affine matrix's parameters.

== Usage in games ==
This graphical method is suited to racing games, such as F-Zero, a futuristic racing game that was one of the console's launch titles. It is also used extensively for the overworld sections of role-playing games such as Square's popular 1994 game Final Fantasy VI. The effect enables developers to create the impression of sprawling worlds that continue toward the horizon.

A particular utilization technique with Mode 7 allows pixels of the background layer to be in front of sprites. Examples include the second and fifth stage of Contra III: The Alien Wars, the second and fifth stage of Jim Power: The Lost Dimension in 3-D, the introduction screen of Tiny Toon Adventures: Buster Busts Loose, when a player falls off the stage in Super Mario Kart, some cinematics in Super Metroid, and in some boss battles in Super Mario World.

=== Counterexamples ===
Some effects that may be mistakenly attributed to Mode 7 can be implemented on the Super NES and other consoles without the specific hardware acceleration of Mode 7.

For instance, while Axelay uses Mode 7 in one boss and in the end credits sequence, that game's rolling vertical scrolling does not use Mode 7.

The Sega Genesis has no hardware-native feature comparable to Mode 7. However, as in Tales of Phantasia and Star Ocean's sprite effect add-ins, some comparable technical feats were programmed entirely in software, as in Dick Vitale's "Awesome, Baby!" College Hoops and Zero Tolerance. The Sega CD, an add-on for the Genesis, added scaling and rotation support on hardware level, as used by Sonic CD and Formula One World Championship: Beyond the Limit. Similarly, such Amiga games include Mr. Nutz: Hoppin' Mad, Lionheart, Obitus, and Brian the Lion.

Filip Hautekeete and Peter Vermeulen created a demo showcasing an emulated interpretation of Mode 7 graphics to test the hardware capabilities of the Atari Jaguar. Impressed with the demo, Atari Corporation decided to make a game that combined F-Zero and Super Mario Kart with a "cutesy" atmosphere, becoming the starting point of Atari Karts.

== Selection of Mode 7 games ==
Games using Mode 7 include:

- 7th Saga
- The ActRaiser series
- Aero the Acro-Bat
- Ace o Nerae!
- Accele Brid
- Al Unser Jr.'s Road to the Top
- Axelay
- Bastard!!
- Batman Returns
- The Brainies
- Brett Hull Hockey 95
- Carrier Aces
- Contra III: The Alien Wars
- Chrono Trigger
- D-Force
- Demon's Crest
- DinoCity
- Exhaust Heat
- F-Zero
- Flying Hero: Bugyuru no Daibouken
- Final Fantasy IV
- Final Fantasy V
- Final Fantasy VI
- The Ganbare Goemon series
- HyperZone
- Illusion of Gaia
- Jurassic Park
- Kat's Run: Zen-Nippon K Car Senshuken
- Kirby Super Star
- Legend
- The Legend of Zelda: A Link to the Past
- Lufia II: Rise of the Sinistrals
- The Magical Quest Starring Mickey Mouse
- MechWarrior
- Mohawk & Headphone Jack
- Mr. Nutz
- NCAA Basketball
- NHL Stanley Cup
- Pilotwings
- Power Rangers Zeo: Battle Racers
- Psycho Dream
- Rendering Ranger: R2
- RoboCop 3
- Romance of the Three Kingdoms IV: Wall of Fire
- R-Type III: The Third Lightning
- Run Saber
- Secret of Evermore
- Secret of Mana and Trials of Mana
- Skyblazer
- SOS
- Space Megaforce
- Star Ocean
- Stargate
- Street Racer
- Super Adventure Island
- Super Air Diver a.k.a. Lock On
- Super Castlevania IV
- Super Ghouls 'n Ghosts
- Super Mario Kart
- Super Mario RPG: Legend of the Seven Stars
- Super Mario World
- Super Mario World 2: Yoshi's Island
- Super Metroid
- The Super Robot Wars series
- Super Scope 6
- The Super Star Wars series
- Super Tennis
- The Super Turrican series
- Tales of Phantasia
- Teenage Mutant Ninja Turtles IV: Turtles in Time
- Terranigma
- Tony Meola's Sidekicks Soccer
- Virtual Bart
- Wing Commander
- Sky Mission a.k.a. Wings 2: Aces High or Blazing Skies
- Yoshi's Safari
- Zoku: The Legend of Bishin

== See also ==
- Ray casting
