= Accele Brid =

1993 video game

- Cover art
- Developer: Genki
- Publisher: Tomy
- Platform: Super Famicom
- Release: JP: November 26, 1993
- Genres: Action; Shooter
- Mode: Single-player

Accele Brid (アクセルブリッド) is a shooter game released by Tomy in 1993 for the Super Famicom.

== Summary ==
Players progress through the game as a robot racing through a pipe, shooting everything that moves. The robot can shoot from both arms, jump, kick and punch. There are also power-ups and bonuses that can be collected to upgrade the robot's weapons and armor.

There are three different types of robots to choose from: Silver Mare, Beliws, and Nitika. Weapons are chosen before each stage. Three difficulty levels can be chosen; ranging from easy, medium, and hard.

== Reception ==
Reception

Review scores
Publication	Score
Computer and Video Games	38/100
Famitsu	6/10, 3/10, 5/10, 3/10
Hippon Super!	5/10

Famitsu praised the 3D effect produced on the SNES and the smooth scrolling, but criticized the hit detection and the game's high level of difficulty.
