= Super Turrican =

Super Turrican may refer to:

- Super Turrican (1992 video game), a 1992 video game developed by Rainbow Arts
- Super Turrican (1993 video game), a 1993 video game developed by Factor 5
- Super Turrican 2, a 1995 video game developed by Factor 5
