= Operation C (video game) =

1991 video game

- North American box art
- Developer: Konami
- Publishers: JP: Konami; NA: Ultra Games; PAL: Palcom
- Programmers: Toru Hagihara; Yukari Hayano
- Artist: Koichi Kimura
- Composer: Hidehiro Funauchi
- Series: Contra
- Platform: Game Boy
- Release: JP: January 8, 1991; NA: January 1991; EU: May 21, 1992
- Genre: Run and gun
- Mode: Single-player

Operation C (released as Contra (コントラ, Kontora) in Japan and as Probotector in the PAL region) is a 1991 run and gun video game by Konami released for the Game Boy. It is a sequel to Super Contra, and the first portable installment in the Contra series. Operation C features gameplay and graphics similar to the Nintendo Entertainment System versions of Contra and Super Contra.

== Gameplay ==
The game has a total of five stages, many of which share design similarities to Super C (the NES version of Super Contra). The three odd-numbered stages (1, 3, and 5) are played from a side-view perspective, while the two even-numbered ones (2 and 4) are top-view. The soundtrack consists primarily of arranged background music from the original Contra, with the exception of a few tunes (namely the Area 2 theme, the Stage Select theme, the sub-boss theme in Area 3, and the ending theme). Operation C was the first Contra game to feature auto-fire as a default feature, resulting in the removal of the Machine Gun power-up from previous games. The Laser Rifle is also removed, leaving only the Spread Shot and Fire Gun from Super C. However, the game introduces a new Homing Gun that fires bullets that chase after enemies. The Spread Shot starts out as a three-way shot, but it can be upgraded to a five-way version after picking it up a second time. Unlike Super C, the Fire Gun does not have chargeable shots, while the Barrier and Rapid Bullets power-ups are not featured in this installment either.

== Plot ==
The player takes the role of Bill Rizer, who must neutralize an enemy force that is secretly storing an alien cell in their base. As with the previous Contra games for the NES, the exact details of the game's settings varies between supplemental materials: in the Japanese version, the enemies are identified as the army of an unnamed hostile nation that is seeking to use an alien cell to produce weapons; in the American version, the enemies are working for an alien entity calling itself "Black Viper". Likewise, the main character's identity was changed from Bill (the Player 1 character from the previous arcade and console games) to Lance (the Player 2 character from the previous installments, as well).

== Versions and re-releases ==
The Japanese version, simply titled Contra, allows the player to begin the game at any of the first four stages. The American version only allows the Stage Select feature to be available by inputting the Konami Code. While the rest of the game was left unchanged for the American version, the plot of the game as featured in the manual was altered for the American localization (as detailed above). The European version, Probotector, changed the main character and some of the enemies into robots, much like the European localizations of the NES installments.

Operation C is included in the Game Boy compilation Konami GB Collection Vol.1 released in 1997 in Japan and in 2000 in Europe. The Japanese version is identical to the original release, but with added Super Game Boy border support. While the version of the game included with the European compilation is titled Probotector, it retains the original human characters from the Japanese release and adds full Game Boy Color support.

The game is included in the 2019 Contra Anniversary Collection for PlayStation 4, Xbox One, Nintendo Switch, and Steam.

== Reception ==
Reception

Aggregate score
Aggregator	Score
GameRankings	80%

Review scores
Publication	Score
Electronic Gaming Monthly	9/10, 9/10, 9/10, 9/10
Famitsu	5/10, 7/10, 8/10, 5/10

Nintendo Life gave the game an 8/10 score, praising the gameplay, controls, enemies, weapons and music, while suggesting that the game borrowed from Super C a bit too much. It also criticized the game's lack of multiplayer option.
