= Contra (video game) =

1987 video game

- NES box cover. Bill and Lance were drawn by British artist Bob Wakelin. The background is from the original Japanese promotional art.
- Developer: Konami
- Publisher: Konami
- Directors: Arcade; Koji Hiroshita; NES; Shigeharu Umezaki; Shinji Kitamoto
- Composers: Arcade; Kazuki Muraoka; NES/Famicom; Hidenori Maezawa; Kiyohiro Sada
- Series: Contra
- Platform: Arcade, Nintendo Entertainment System: Amstrad CPC, BlackBerry OS, Commodore 64, Java Platform, Micro Edition, IBM Personal Computer, MS-DOS, MSX2, ZX Spectrum
- Release: February 1987: Arcade; JP: February 1987; EU: 1987; NA: March 1987 Amstrad CPC; EU: 1987 ZX Spectrum; EU: December 1987 NES/Famicom; JP: February 9, 1988; NA: February 12, 1988; EU: November 1990 Commodore 64; EU: February 1988; NA: 1988 MS-DOS; NA: 1988; EU: 1988 MSX2; JP: May 26, 1989
- Genre: Run and gun
- Modes: Single-player, multiplayer
- Arcade system: Nintendo VS. System

Contra (Note: Japanese: 魂斗羅(コントラ), Hepburn: Kontora) is a 1987 run and gun video game developed and published by Konami for arcades. A home version was released for the Nintendo Entertainment System in 1988, along with ports for various home computer formats, including the MSX2. The arcade and computer versions were localized as Gryzor in Europe, and the NES version as Probotector in the PAL region.

The arcade game was a commercial success worldwide, becoming one of the top four highest-grossing dedicated arcade games of 1987 in the United States. The NES version was also a critical and commercial success, with Electronic Gaming Monthly awarding it for being the Best Action Game of 1988. Several Contra sequels were produced following the original game.

== Gameplay ==
Bill and Lance attacking the second base in the arcade version.

=== Overview ===
Contra employs a variety of playing perspectives, which include a standard side view, a pseudo-3D view (in which the player proceeds by shooting and moving towards the background, in addition to left or right) and a fixed screen format (in which the player has their gun aimed upwards by default). Up to two people can play simultaneously, with one player as Bill (the blond-haired commando wearing a white tank top and blue bandana), and the other player as Lance (the shirtless dark-haired commando with a red bandana).

=== Controls ===
The controls consist of an eight-way joystick and two action buttons for shooting (left) and jumping (right). When one of the protagonists jumps, he curls into a somersault instead of doing a conventional jump like in other games. The joystick controls not only the player's movement while running and jumping, but also his aiming. During side view stages, the player can shoot leftward, rightward or upward while standing, as well as horizontally and diagonally while running. The player can also shoot in any of eight directions, including downwards, while jumping. Pressing the joystick downwards while standing will cause the character to lie down on his stomach, allowing him to avoid enemy fire and shoot low targets. When the jump button is pressed while crouching on a higher platform, the character will drop down to a lower level.

=== Weapons ===
The player's default weapon is a rifle with unlimited ammunition that can be upgraded into one of four other guns. These can be obtained by destroying the pill box sensors and flying item capsules containing them, or by defeating the red-clad guards in the enemy bases. These consist of a machine gun that fires rapidly when the fire button is held down, a laser gun that shoots a powerful beam, a fireball gun that shoots its rounds in a corkscrew pattern, and a shotgun that shoots five individual bullets in individual directions. There are also two auxiliary power-ups that only appear in certain areas when the character is armed: a rapid-bullets upgrade that increases the firing speed of the gun's shots and a barrier that makes the character invulnerable for a limited period. With the exception of the machine gun and the laser gun, each item comes in the form of a Falcon-shaped symbol marked with a letter representing its function (F, S, R and B). Though in the home versions of the game, machine gun and laser gun also come in the form of a Falcon-shaped symbol marked with a letter representing its function (M and L respectively).

=== Player lives ===
The player loses a life if their character (Bill or Lance) comes into contact with enemies or their missiles, fails to complete a base stage before the time limit, or falls into a bottomless pit. When that happens, the character will revert to his default weapon on his next life. After losing all lives, the player can continue by inserting more coins (if necessary) and pressing Start, but only up to three times. A second player can join in anytime, but if one player loses all of their lives, they must wait until the other player loses their lives as well to continue together.

=== Stages ===
The arcade version of Contra consists of seven stages (the number of stages and level structures vary in later versions). The first stage is a side-scrolling level where the player character is dropped into the jungle and must fend off the enemy's initial line of defense until he reaches the entrance of the first base, where he must destroy a large sensor to enter the base. The game switches to a 3D view for the second stage, where the player character must fight his way through a series of passageways inside the base before time runs out (a display at the top of the screen shows the map of the base and the time remaining). The player must destroy a generator at the other side of each passageway in order to deactivate the electric current preventing access. The third stage is set in the core of the base in a fixed screen, where the player must destroy the enemy's defense system in order to expose the final target, a giant eyeball that shoots fireballs.

Stages 4 through 6 proceed similarly to the first three stages. Stage 4 is a vertically-scrolling level where the player must jump their way to the top of a waterfall until reaching the entrance of the second base, where the player must destroy a large diamond-shaped sensor guarded by a defense system in order to clear the stage. Stage 5 is another 3D stage set inside another base, while Stage 6 is another boss battle, this time against a pair of heads that split into two images each. The heads can only be damaged when their split images align together.

The seventh and final stage returns to the side-scrolling format of the first stage, as the player fights through the enemy's final line of defense (which includes a hovercraft, armored trucks, and giant helmeted soldiers) while proceeding through areas such as a snowfield, an energy plant and a hangar, to eventually reach the alien's lair, where the regular enemy soldiers are replaced with otherworldly creatures. The player must fight a giant alien head that spawns larvae from its mouth before reaching the final target, a cardiac creature that must be destroyed in order to complete the mission.

=== Releases ===
The arcade game was released in three versions. The Japanese and American versions are virtually identical, aside from the Japanese version using kanji characters to spell the game's title. However, the European version, titled Gryzor, only allows two players to play the game alternating rather than simultaneously.

== Plot ==
Contra is set in the distant future of the year 2633 A.D., when the evil Red Falcon Organization have set a base on the fictional Galuga archipelago near New Zealand in a plot to wipe out humanity. Two commandos, Bill Rizer and Lance Bean of the Earth Marine Corp's Contra unit (an elite group of soldiers specializing in guerrilla warfare), are sent to the island to destroy the enemy forces and uncover the true nature of the alien entity controlling them.

=== Differences in the US release ===
The promotional materials for the US arcade version downplays the futuristic setting of the game, with the manual for the later NES and home computer versions changing the game's setting from the future to the present day and the location from Galuga to the Amazon Jungle.

== Release ==
=== Home computers ===
Under license from Konami, Ocean Software produced ports under the title of Gryzor (the European arcade title) for the ZX Spectrum, Commodore 64, and Amstrad CPC, which were released in Europe in 1988. The Commodore 64 version was released in North America under the Contra title. Ocean's ports were patterned after the original arcade version of the game. An IBM PC version was developed by Banana Development Inc and released in North America. This version was released in Europe under the Gryzor name. The cover illustration of Ocean's Gryzor ports by Bob Wakelin was inspired by the then upcoming film Predator starring actor Arnold Schwarzenegger . The illustration was later used for the packaging of the NES version. The Japanese MSX2 version had an exclusive photo cover; despite that, Wakelin's illustration was used in the back cover. The other character was inspired by the 1982 film Rambo starring actor Sylvester Stallone. A clone game, The Contras, was released for the TRS-80 Color Computer by Sundog Systems.

=== Nintendo Entertainment System ===
The boss of Stage 3 in the NES version

Contra was released for the Nintendo Entertainment System in North America in February 1988. This version was produced in-house by Konami, and features several differences from the arcade release in order to better suit the NES's hardware. This version was released for arcades by Nintendo in 1988.

==== Graphics ====
For example, sprites for effects (like explosions) are shown at 30fps instead of 60fps to work around the sprite limitations of the system. Another game to use this technique is Recca.

The game can be played by one or two players, but due to the graphical limitations of the NES, Bill and Lance lost their individualized character designs. Instead, they are both depicted as shirtless commandos distinguished by the colors of their pants (blue for Bill and red for Lance). When one player loses all of their lives, they are given the option to use the other player's stock to keep fighting.

==== Weapons ====
The power-up icons for the Machine Gun and Laser Gun were also changed and are now represented by letter-based falcon symbols (M and L) used by the other weapons. The Rapid Bullets and Barrier power-ups are also more common in this version, since unlike the arcade game, the flying item capsules now appear regardless of which weapon the player character currently possesses. The NES version introduces a seventh item that clears the screen of all on screen enemies when obtained.

==== Reworked stages ====
The NES version recomposes the seven stages of the arcade version into eight stages. Stages 2 and 3 were combined into one stage, resulting in the renumbering of the Waterfall level from Stage 4 to Stage 3, while Stages 5 and 6 were combined into the new Stage 4. The final four stages of the NES version (the Snowfield, Energy Zone, Hangar, and Alien Lair) are based on the different areas featured in the arcade version's final stage.

The level designs themselves are drastically different from the arcade version too. The two base stages for example (Stage 2 and 4), no longer have their mazelike structures, nor is there any time limit involved. The boss of the waterfall stage was also changed from a diamond-shaped sensor to an alien statue.

==== The Konami Code ====
Contra was one of the early NES games to feature the Konami Code. Inputting the code at the title screen starts the player with thirty lives instead of the usual three. The cheat remains in effect when the player runs out of lives and uses a continue to retry a stage.

=== Famicom version ===
Contra was released for the Famicom in Japan on February 9, 1988. The Famicom version used a Konami cartridge PCB and the company's VRC2 Memory Management Controller which allowed for effects such as animated backgrounds. As cost reasons did not permit the use of it in the NES release, it was switched to a cheaper, more limited Nintendo UNROM board which had half the ROM size of the original game. Additionally, the Famicom version contains cutscenes, an additional music track, and environment effects.

The game begins with a prologue sequence explaining the game's backstory, followed by a map of the Galuga archipelago, which is shown at the start of every stage to indicate the player's progress. Cutscenes are also shown between stages, depicting Bill (or Lance) giving a status report of his current situation to headquarters, and, in later stages, shooting his gun towards the screen.

The ending sequence is also slightly different. And if the player holds the select and start buttons during the credits sequence, a secret message will be displayed after the Konami logo. Other differences include the addition of a sound test mode, added background animations in certain stages (such as windblown palm leaves in Stage 1 and a snowstorm in Stage 5), a different stage clear jingle when the player clears the final stage, and a level select cheat code.

=== PAL version ===
Probotector is a modified version of the NES Contra that was released for the PAL region on December 28, 1990. This version redesigns the human protagonists and some of the enemy characters to give them a robotic appearance.

The change was done to circumvent the BPjM's censorship laws in Germany, which prohibits the sales of violent video games to minors. Subsequent Contra games for home consoles followed suit, all being released in the PAL region under the Probotector title and featuring similar modifications. Beginning with Contra: Legacy of War, Konami abandoned the Probotector title and localized most of the further games with minimal changes.

=== MSX2 ===
An MSX2 version of Contra was released by Konami exclusively in Japan on May 26, 1989. The MSX2 version greatly differs from the arcade and NES versions. Due to hardware limitations of the MSX2, the game does not scroll but instead uses flip-screens like other MSX2 games such as Metal Gear and Vampire Killer. The game uses the SCC sound chip.

Rather than one-hit kills, there is an energy gauge, which allows Bill Rizer to take more than one shot or hit before losing a life. There are two main power-ups in the MSX2 version, a Falcon-shaped power-up that increases the player's running and shooting speed, as well as a gun-shaped power-up which allows the player to change their current weapon. After picking up the weapon power-up, the player can choose between the default Normal Gun or four other weapons. The shotgun is not featured in this version, replaced by the Rear Gun similar to the tailgun in Gradius II, which fires in two directions at the same time.

The MSX2 version Contra is composed of 19 stages. Stages 1 through 6 are drawn directly from the arcade version, whereas Stages 7 through 9 are based on the different areas featured in the final stage of the arcade version in a matter similar to the final four stages of the NES version. Stages 10 through 19 are new to this version and take place primarily in an underground facility underneath the Galuga Archipelago.

Unlike the arcade and NES versions, the MSX2 version is single-player only (Lance Bean does not appear in any form), and has no continuation feature; if a player loses all lives, the game will end immediately. However, the Game Master II utility cartridge can be used to save progress via its S-RAM backup feature.

=== Later releases ===
A PlayStation 2 port of the arcade version of Contra was released in Japan on May 25, 2006, as part of the Oretachi Gēsen Zoku series of retro game ports by Hamster Corporation. A second re-release was made for the Xbox 360's Live Arcade on November 8 of the same year, with Digital Eclipse handling the conversion. The same version was also released on December 15, 2009, as part of the Konami Classics Vol. 2 compilation. The arcade version was also included in Konami's classic game compilation Konami Classics Series: Arcade Hits for the Nintendo DS. Hamster Corporation released the arcade version as part of their Arcade Archives series for the PlayStation 4 in 2016 and Nintendo Switch in 2020. It includes the option to play both the Japanese and US versions. The arcade, NES, and Famicom versions are included in Contra Anniversary Collection, which was developed by M2 and released in June 2019 for the PlayStation 4, Nintendo Switch, Xbox One and PC via Steam to commemorate Konami's 50th anniversary.

During Konami Mobile's tenure, several variations of Contra were released for different mobile phones, which are based on the arcade version.

The NES version of Contra is included in the video game compilation Konami Collector's Series: Castlevania & Contra for Microsoft Windows, released in North America in 2002, which also includes Super C and the three Castlevania games released for the NES. The NES Contra and Super C are included in Contra 4 for the Nintendo DS as unlockable bonuses. The MSX2 version of Contra was released for the Virtual Console in Japan on February 2, 2010 for the Wii and on October 15, 2014 for the Wii U. On July 15, 2019, My Arcade announced its acquisition of the Contra license for its line of Micro Player mini arcade machine replicas, and Pocket Player portable video game players.

A reimagined version titled Contra: Operation Galuga was developed by WayForward, the developers of Contra 4, in conjunction with Konami and released in March 2024.

== Reception ==
Reception

Aggregate scores
Aggregator	Score		
Aggregator	Arcade	NES	Xbox 360
GameRankings		90%	65%
Metacritic			63/100

Review scores
Publication	Score		
Publication	Arcade	NES	Xbox 360
AllGame	3.5/5	4/5	
Famitsu		6/10, 8/10, 7/10, 6/10	
Your Sinclair	Positive		
The Video Games Guide	3/5		
Total!		85%	
Famicom Hisshoubon		3.5/5	

Award
Publication	Award
Electronic Gaming Monthly	Best Action Game

In Japan, the arcade game topped the Game Machine chart for table arcade cabinets in April 1987. In the United Kingdom, Gryzor was a blockbuster hit in the arcades and the home computer versions topped the Gallup charts. In the United States, Contra became one of the top four highest-grossing dedicated arcade games of 1987. The 1988 Nintendo Entertainment System port became and remained widely popular and remembered. The game sold 2 million units. Much of the game's popularity came from its two-player simultaneous co-op gameplay.

The arcade game received generally favorable reviews from critics upon release. Peter Shaw of Your Sinclair called Gryzor one of his "favourite" games at the time. Clare Edgeley of Computer and Video Games said "Lots of shooting and no time for a breather makes Gryzor one hell of a tiring game to play."

The NES version received a positive reception from critics. Arnie Katz, Bill Kunkel and Joyce Worley of Computer Gaming World called Contra on the NES "a truly outstanding action epic" set on a "scrolling and beautifully drawn playfield". The four reviewers in the Japanese gaming magazine Famicom Tsūshin gave the Famicom (NES) version of the game scores of 6, 8, 7 and 6 out of ten each. A review in Famicom Hisshoubon complimented the game praising the graphics as being excellent, particularly the flips the characters do as the jump in the air. Electronic Gaming Monthly awarded it for being the Best Action Game of 1988. AllGame editor Skyler Miller praised Contra, touting that the game "became the standard by which future platform shooters would be judged". The MS-DOS version of the game received a negative review in Dragon No. 142 by Hartley, Patricia, and Kirk Lesser in "The Role of Computers" column in 1989; they criticized Konami's copy protection which prevented the game from booting up on their computer.

In 2004, the NES version of Contra was inducted into GameSpot's list of the greatest games of all time. Contra was voted No. 1 by gaming website IGN as being the "Toughest Game to Beat". Nintendo Power ranked it as the seventh best NES game, calling it one of the best multiplayer NES games. Electronic Gaming Monthly listed the NES version as the 45th best console video game of all time, similarly saying that it "set the standard for all two-player simultaneous action games to follow." GamesRadar ranked it the 10th best NES game ever made, considering it possibly superior to the arcade version. Game Informer also included it in their list of best games ever at number 13. The staff noted that while not revolutionary, it was fun. In 2017, Contra ranked 82nd in "The Scientifically Proven Best Video Games of All Time", a statistical meta-analysis compiled by Warp Zoned of 44 "top games" lists published between 1995 and 2016.

== Legacy ==
Contra was followed by Super Contra later the same year. It is the only Contra sequel for the arcades developed in-house by Konami. Following the success of the NES adaptations of both the original and its sequel (which was retitled Super C in its American release), subsequent sequels were produced specifically for the home console market such as Contra III: The Alien Wars for the Super NES and Contra: Hard Corps for the Genesis, becoming one of Konami's flagship series. As of 2024, the series has 13 installments.

The music from the arcade version of Contra is one of the soundtracks included in the video game album Konami Game Music Vol.4: A Jax, which was released by Alfa Records on May 10, 1988, in CD (catalog no. 28XA-201), cassette (ALC-22922), and vinyl (ALR-22922).

In April 2017, Beijing Starlit Movie and TV Culture announced they were producing a live-action film version of Contra in China. Wei Nan is listed as the screenwriter. The project was scheduled for release on June 6, 2018, but it did not meet that release date.

While the Konami code was first introduced with the home versions of Gradius, larger awareness of the code's existence in Konami's games grew significantly with its inclusion in the home versions of Contra (where it gave the player 30 extra lives to help complete the difficult game).

A board game adaptation was developed by Blacklist Games and Kess Co. and was released in 2022.

== See also ==
- Konami Code
- Rush'n Attack (Green Beret) – A 1985 side-scrolling run-and-gun shooter from Konami.

== Bibliography ==
- Kalata, Kurt (2017). Hardcore Gaming 101 Presents: Contra and Other Konami Classics. ISBN 978-1546928034.
