= Super Contra =

1988 video game

- European arcade flyer
- Developer: Konami
- Publisher: Konami
- Directors: Hideyuki Tsujimoto, K. Wada, S. Fujiwara, Takashi Kondo (arcade)
- Producer: Koji Hiroshita
- Programmers: Eric Freytag (DOS); Shigeharu Umezaki (NES)
- Artists: Kengo Nakamura; Setsu Muraki (NES)
- Writer: Hideyuki Tsujimoto
- Composers: Kazuki Muraoka, Motoaki Furukawa (Arcade); Kris Hatlelid, Michael J. Sokyrka (DOS); Hidenori Maezawa, Yūichi Sakakura (NES)
- Series: Contra
- Platforms: Arcade, Nintendo Entertainment System, Xbox 360, Amiga, IBM PC, MS-DOS
- Release: January 1988: Arcade; JP: January 1988 (Note: After location testing in December 1987, it had a wide release in January 1988.); NA: March 1988 NES/Famicom; JP: February 2, 1990; NA: April 5, 1990; EU: August 1992 Amiga; NA: 1990 MS-DOS; NA: 1990 Microsoft Windows; NA: November 16, 2002
- Genre: Run and gun game
- Modes: Single-player, multiplayer
- Arcade system: Konami GX775, PlayChoice-10

Super Contra, known as Super Contra: The Alien Strikes Back (Note: Japanese: スーパー魂斗羅 エイリアンの逆襲, Hepburn: Sūpā Kontora: Eirian no Gyakushū) in Japan, is a run and gun video game developed and published by Konami for arcades. After location testing in December 1987, it had a wide release in January 1988. It is the sequel to Contra and part of the Contra series. The game stars Bill Rizer and Lance Bean as they are sent to thwart another alien invasion from the vicious Red Falcon.

It was ported to the Nintendo Entertainment System under the shortened title of Super C in North America and as Probotector II: Return of the Evil Forces in Europe. Both the arcade version and the NES version have been re-released for various other platforms since their original releases.

== Plot ==
A year after the battle with the Red Falcon Organization, (Note: The game takes place on December 2634 according to the opening sequence of the Japanese version, although this detail was removed from the international version.) Bill and Lance are sent on another mission. This time, the alien forces have taken over an allied military base, possessing most of its troops. Bill and Lance must not only fight against their former comrades-in-arms, but also a new mutated form of the same alien creatures they fought during their previous mission.

== Gameplay ==
The first level in Super Contra. Inclined surfaces, as shown here, were not present in the original Contra.

Like in the original Contra, the game can be played by up to two players simultaneously. The left player controls Bill (who wears green in this installment), while the right player controls Lance (who wears purple). The game retains the side-scrolling format from the previous game, discarding only the pseudo-3D and fixed screen segments. Instead, Super Contra features vertically-scrolling stages played from an overhead perspective, in which the player can move in eight directions. The controls remain mostly the same during the side-scrolling segments, with the only difference is that the player can now control the height of their jump by holding the joystick upwards or downwards while pressing the jump button.

The player can replace their default gun with one of four possible weapons by destroying the flying item capsules that appear throughout each stage. The available weapons include a machine gun, a spread gun, a bomb gun and a laser gun. This time, weapons can be upgraded by picking up the same power-up twice in a row, resulting in greater destructive power. The power-ups in Super Contra are represented by the actual guns the player's character wields instead of the Falcon-shaped letter icons from the previous game. During overhead stages, the player can also pick up a "hyper shell" item that destroys all on-screen enemies, which can be launched at any time during these stages by pressing the jump button. The player can store more than one hyper shell at a time and the count is carried over between overhead stages.

The game consists of five stages, which include the exterior and interior of a military base, a jungle and the exterior and interior of the alien's lair. Stages 1, 3 and 4 are played from the standard side-scrolling perspective, while Stages 2 and 5 employ the top-down perspective. Throughout each stage, the player must fight their way through the enemy's line of defense (including a few mid-bosses) until they reach the final target waiting at the end.

Counting the starting credit, the player is allowed to use up to four or six credits to clear the game (depending on the DIP settings); this means that starting a two-players game results in less continues to clear the game. Unlike the predecessor, each player can now continue at any time, with no need to wait until the other player runs out of lives.

== Version differences ==
Two versions of the Super Contra arcade game were produced: an English version (which was distributed not just in North America, but also in Europe, where the game retained its original title, in contrast to the Gryzor variant of the first arcade game) and a Japanese version. The two versions of the game are almost identical aside from the language of the text shown during the intro sequence. However, the English version ends the game after the player has cleared the final stage, whereas the Japanese version restarts the game from the first stage after the end credits are shown. On the second loop, the player's score, lives and weapons (including hyper shells) will be carried over from the previous playthrough and the game's difficulty will be set to its highest level (regardless of the machine's actual setting), but the continuation feature will cease to be available. This means the game will be completely over when the player completes the final stage again or runs out of lives.

== Ports ==
=== Nintendo Entertainment System ===
A home version of Super Contra was released for the Nintendo Entertainment System on February 2, 1990, in Japan and in April 1990 in North America, where it was retitled Super C in order to avoid association with the Iran–Contra affair. A PAL version of the NES game, titled Probotector II: Return of the Evil Forces, was released in 1992.

The gameplay and graphics of Super C are similar to the port of the first Contra game. There are three stages unique to the NES version: a high-tech base, a mountain and an alien nest, all vertically-scrolling stages. The order of the latter stages and bosses are also slightly different, with new bosses featured in this version (including a new final boss). The NES version uses the same power-ups as the original NES game, but changes the function of the "fire ball" power-up from a gun that fires small fireballs that travel in a corkscrew pattern to a large projectile that spreads fire after hitting its target. The player can charge this gun by holding down the B button and then releasing it, shooting an even larger projectile that passes through most fodder enemies and causes an even bigger explosion (with 8 sparks) when it hits a large target. The Rapid Bullets, Barrier and Special power-ups from the first NES game are also included in this game.

The Konami Code from the original Contra was not included in this game. A different code was added which gives out thirty lives in the Famicom version and ten lives in the NES versions. Like in the Famicom version of Contra, the Japanese Super Contra has a stage select code that was removed from its NES counterparts. All three versions contain a sound test mode. Like the first NES game, Probotector II (the PAL version), replaced the main characters and some of the enemies with robots.

The original arcade soundtrack was rearranged for the Japanese and North American versions by Hidenori Maezawa. Because the soundtrack used DPCM samples of orchestra hits, Yuichi Sakakura altered the sound driver for Probotector II to avoid playing the samples out of tune (a common occurrence in previous NTSC-to-PAL conversions).

=== Other platforms ===
A pair of computer versions of Super C developed by Distinctive Software were released in North America for the Amiga and IBM PC compatibles by Konami in 1990. Despite bearing the NES version's title of Super C, the computer ports are based on the original arcade game.

A direct emulation of the arcade Super Contra was released on Xbox Live Arcade for the Xbox 360 on July 25, 2007, and features enhanced graphics, remixed music and cooperative gameplay via Xbox Live. The arcade version was re-released on June 12, 2019 on the Contra Anniversary Collection for the Nintendo Switch, PlayStation 4, Windows, and Xbox One and it was developed by M2 in honor of Konami's 50th anniversary. It was also later given a standalone release by Hamster Corporation via the Arcade Archives lineup, released for the Nintendo Switch and PlayStation 4 on January 18, 2024.

The NES version also saw several re-releases. The 2002 Windows compilation Konami Collectors' Series: Castlevania and Contra features Super C along with the NES version of the original game, as well as the first three Castlevania games for the system. Super C was later released as a Virtual Console title for the Wii in North America in 2007. A corresponding release of Probotector 2: Return of the Evil Forces was made for the European and Australian Virtual Console. The Famicom Super Contra was released for the Japanese Virtual Console on February 12, 2008. Both the NES versions of Contra and Super C are also included as unlockable bonuses in the Nintendo DS game Contra 4, released in 2007. The NES version of Super C is also included on the Virtual Console for the Nintendo 3DS in 2013, as well as the Wii U in 2014, and the NES Classic Edition dedicated console released in 2016. Like its arcade counterpart, the NES game is included on the Contra Anniversary Collection compilation in 2019.

A mobile phone version of Super Contra was released in Japan and China (Super Contra 2) on March 5, 2008, coinciding with the release of Contra: Dual Spirits (the Japanese localization of Contra 4). This version features the stages from the NES version, but with graphics similar to the arcade game (including the opening intro).

== Super Contra 7 ==
A bootleg hack of Super C, titled Super Contra 7, was produced by Fuzhou-based Waixing Science & Technology (under the pseudonym ESC Co. Ltd.) in 1996. This hack replaced the level designs with ones stolen from other games (such as Mighty Final Fight), and included different bosses, one of which was the second boss from the original Contra, and others from Shatterhand. The physics vary from the original Super C, as the game runs at a lower framerate, and the Konami code is much easier to execute, requiring the player to hold the A and B buttons while the game starts. The game was later re-released as Super Contra 8 in 1999. The game gained attention primarily for being far more challenging than the original Super C, which was primarily due to glitches, and for containing stolen assets. It was also reviewed by James Rolfe.

Waixing later produced a genericized hack of Super Contra 7, titled Super Fight I, which was primarily used on plug and play consoles. This was to be legally distinct, in an attempt to protect Waixing's licensees in Western Europe and North America from legal trouble with Konami. Other hacks include Xtreme Robot, a hack of Super Fight I with improved graphics utilizing altered famiclone technology, and New Contra, a title screen hack for Super Contra 7 which was likely not produced by Waixing.

== Reception ==
Reception

Aggregate scores
Aggregator	Score
GameRankings	NES: 75%
Metacritic	X360: 61/100

Review scores
Publication	Score
AllGame	4/5 (NES)
Electronic Gaming Monthly	8/10, 8/10, 8/10, 8/10 (NES)
Famitsu	25/40 (Famicom)
IGN	7.5/10
Nintendo Life	8/10
Nintendo Power	4/5
Total!	91%

In Japan, Game Machine listed Super Contra on their March 1, 1988 issue as being the fourth most-successful table arcade unit of the month. The NES port Super C sold more than 500,000 units.

Super Contra received positive reviews. Allgame editor Aaron Kosydar described Super C as "an excellent game that a lot of hardcore gamers will never forget". Japanese game magazine Famitsu gave the Famicom (NES) version of the game a score of 25 out of 40.

In 1997, Electronic Gaming Monthly listed it as the 9th best arcade game of all time.
