= Contra: Hard Corps =

1994 video game

- North American cover art
- Developer: Konami
- Publisher: Konami
- Director: Nobuya Nakazato
- Producer: Tomikazu Kirita
- Programmer: Kenji Miyaoka
- Artists: Shinichiro Shimamura; Kazuya Suzuki
- Writer: Nobuya Nakazato
- Composer: Hiroshi Kobayashi
- Series: Contra
- Platform: Sega Genesis
- Release: NA: September 14, 1994; JP: September 15, 1994; PAL: October 11, 1994
- Genre: Run and gun
- Modes: Single-player, multiplayer

Contra: Hard Corps, released as Contra: The Hard Corps in Japan and Probotector in Europe and Australia, is a 1994 run and gun game developed and published by Konami for the Sega Genesis, making it the first game in the Contra series released for a Sega platform.

Set five years after the events of Contra III: The Alien Wars, a terrorist group led by the renegade Colonel Bahamut has stolen an alien cell recovered from the war and now intends to use it to produce weapons. A new task force, known as the titular "Hard Corps", are sent to deal with the situation. The game features a branching storyline with multiple possible endings.

Hard Corps spawned its own series of follow-ups; including the Appaloosa-developed sequels, Contra: Legacy of War and C: The Contra Adventure; and the Arc System Works-developed prequel, Hard Corps: Uprising. Hard Corps has since been considered to be a spin-off from the mainline Contra entries.

In June 2019, it was re-released as part of Contra: Anniversary Collection for Nintendo Switch, PlayStation 4, Windows, and Xbox One and was also included in the Genesis Mini dedicated console that same year. The game was also re-released on the Nintendo Classics service on October 25, 2021.

== Gameplay ==
Ray and Sheena confront the "Maximum Jumbo", a giant robot sub-boss in Stage 1.

The objective of each stage of the game is to reach the end by shooting at every enemy that gets in the way, and fight the boss awaiting at the end. While most of the game have the character walking on foot, certain stages have the player riding a Motoroid, a hoverbike that can transform into an ostrich-like robot. Unlike previous Contra games, which feature overhead segments in addition to the regular side-view stages, all the stages in Hard Corps retain the standard side-view perspective for most of the game. Another difference is the player can now choose between one of four unique player characters. A new feature to the game is that the story is advanced through story cutscenes.

Like in the previous Contra games, a maximum of two players can play simultaneously, but they are not allowed to choose the same character.

The controls are similar to Contra III, but have been adapted to work with the Genesis's standard three-button controller, as well as the six-button controller. The three main buttons (A, B, and C) are used for switching between weapons, shooting, and jumping respectively in the default control configuration. By pressing the weapon change button while shooting (or the X, Y, or Z buttons on the six-button controller), the player can toggle between two shooting styles: one which allows for free movement while shooting, and another which keeps the character still while he or she aims in one of eight directions. The player can also jump down from certain platforms, as well as move on walls and ceilings like in Contra III. A new ability added to the game is a sliding technique performed by holding the directional pad diagonally downwards while pressing the jump button. The character will be invulnerable while sliding and can even harm certain enemies.

The player can now carry up to four different weapons, as well as a supply of bombs. Like in previous games, weapons are obtained from flying capsule pods. This time the weapon items are now labeled "A", "B", "C", and "D", which will vary depending on the character controlled by the player. Each player begins with a standard machine gun, which can be upgraded to a different semi-automatic weapon by picking up the A-type power-up. When the player's character loses a life, the weapon they had equipped will be lost. Unlike Contra III, the player's supply of bombs will remain the same when a life is lost.

Another unique feature to Contra: Hard Corps is the addition of branching paths that allows the player to play through a different set of stages depending on key decisions made during key moments of the game's story.

The Japanese version, titled Contra: The Hard Corps, is significantly easier than its overseas counterparts due to the addition of a life gauge that allows the player to take three hits from an enemy before losing a life. The Japanese version also features unlimited continues, in contrast with the American version, which only allows the player to continue five times. Animator Yasuomi Umetsu provided the cover and manual illustrations for the Japanese version.

The PAL version of the game is titled Probotector and like the European localizations of previous Contra games for home consoles, the main characters (CX-1 through 4) and some of the enemies were renamed and replaced with robotic counterparts (Browny was left unchanged, with only his name changed). The plot was also rewritten, with Colonel Bahamut and Dead-Eye Joe being redesigned as humanoid aliens, and the alien cell was replaced with a computer device called the "X-Drive". The gameplay is the same as the North American version, but the player only has four continues in the European version, instead of five like in the North American release. Some cutscenes were also altered. For example, the player character no longer identifies the boss of Stage 1, a robot previously thought unmanned, to be piloted by a man, or Dr. Geo Mandrake being eaten by a monster created in his merger machine. It is also impossible to side with the Alien General in this version, thus eliminating one of the endings.

== Plot ==
Set five years after Contra III: The Alien Wars, Contra: Hard Corps follows a special task force formed to combat lingering alien threats and rogue military factions. The elite "Hard Corps" unit—consisting of commandos Ray Poward and Sheena Etranzi, the cyborg Brad Fang, and the combat robot Browny—is deployed to defend a city under attack by terrorists. The chaos is revealed to be orchestrated by Colonel Bahamut, a former government scientist who has stolen a powerful alien cell capable of creating devastating bio-organic weapons.

The player's mission branches after an early encounter with Bahamut's mercenary, Deadeye Joe. Depending on the chosen route, the Hard Corps may pursue Joe through high-speed hoverbike chases and battles against mechanical spiders and transport ships, or race to rescue a besieged research facility, fighting enemy forces aboard helicopters and assault planes. Other stages take the team into junkyards, alien-infested jungles, and industrial zones, each culminating in elaborate multi-phase boss encounters.

As the narrative unfolds, the Hard Corps uncover Bahamut's plan to weaponize the alien cell to take control of Earth. The squad is forced to make pivotal decisions that alter the progression of the story, such as whether to infiltrate Bahamut's headquarters, destroy his orbital space station, or confront the alien nest directly. One route features the return of Red Falcon, tying the events of Hard Corps to earlier Contra conflicts, while others emphasize Bahamut's growing ambition and the militarization of alien technology.

The game features multiple endings based on the player's choices. In one, the Hard Corps destroy the alien cell before its mutation can spread, while in another they defeat Bahamut aboard his space station but perish in the ensuing explosion—a heroic sacrifice honored by the people of Earth. Alternate outcomes include joining Bahamut's forces for personal gain or being trapped in an alternate dimension after a secret arena battle.

== Development ==
In an October 1994 interview for BEEP! Magazine, development leader Nobuya Nakazato discussed the creative direction of Contra: Hard Corps. He emphasized that the game was designed specifically for the Japanese Mega Drive market, countering the perception that Konami had shifted its focus toward Western audiences. The team aimed to create a title that encouraged replayability through branching routes, unique stage designs, and minimal enemy reuse. Nakazato also noted that each playable character changes the tone of the game, from the traditional, serious atmosphere with Ray Powered to a more comedic feel when using Brownie.

Stage design was a major focus during development. The first stage was deliberately filled with varied mechanics and set pieces to ensure it would remain engaging on multiple playthroughs. The game's signature branching routes were designed to offer distinct experiences, such as the military train with its large multi-sprite "Yokozuna Giant Ninja" boss, or the alien lair inspired by a team visit to the Meguro Parasite Museum. The orbital elevator stage was considered a unique addition, blending absurdity with a more emotional ending, and featured some of Nakazato's favorite music.

A hidden stage was added late in development, surprising management but ultimately approved. Despite the physical demands of the project, the team's enthusiasm as longtime Contra fans fueled their work. According to Nakazato, the game was not created for commercial reasons alone but out of a shared passion for delivering a memorable Contra experience.

== Reception ==
Reception

Review scores
Publication	Score
Beep! MegaDrive	7.75/10
Computer and Video Games	92/100
Electronic Gaming Monthly	8/10, 7/10, 7/10, 7/10
Famitsu	7/10, 5/10, 7/10, 5/10
Game Informer	8.25/10
Game Players	92%
GameFan	89/100, 88/100, 90/100
GamesMaster	93/100
Mean Machines Sega	94/100
Next Generation	3/5
Electronic Games	B
Games World	89/100
Mega	88%
Sega Power	74%
Sega Pro	74%
VideoGames	9/10

According to Famitsu, Contra: Hard Corps sold 13,363 copies in its first week on the market and 23,365 copies during its lifetime in Japan. The Japanese publication Micom BASIC Magazine ranked the game first in popularity in its December 1994 issue, and it received a 22.6/30 score in a poll conducted by Mega Drive Fan and a 8.3571/10 score in a 1995 readers' poll conducted by the Japanese Sega Saturn Magazine, ranking among Sega Mega Drive titles at the number 55 spot. It also garnered generally favorable reviews from critics.

GamePro's Lawrence Neves praised the game for its impressive bosses, "eye-catching" graphics, explosions "which test the limits of TV speakers", simple control configuration, and intense action. Electronic Gaming Monthly's four editors recommended the game for its four character selection, intense action, and impressive graphical effects, though they remarked that the difficulty can be extremely frustrating. Next Generation stated that "Contra: Hard Corps is the ultimate side-scrolling shooter and a beast of a game that won't be easily defeated".
