= Contra III: The Alien Wars =

1992 video game

- North American box art by Tom duBois
- Developer: Konami (Note: Game Boy port developed by Factor 5)
- Publisher: Konami
- Director: Nobuya Nakazato
- Producer: Kazumi Kitaue
- Programmers: Mitsuru Yaida; Hideyuki Suganami
- Artist: Nobuya Nakazato
- Composers: Miki Higashino; Masanori Adachi; Tappi Iwase
- Series: Contra
- Platforms: Super NES, Game Boy, Game Boy Advance
- Release: February 28, 1992: Super NES; JP: February 28, 1992; NA: March 26, 1992; EU: September 12, 1992 Game Boy; JP: September 23, 1994; EU: October 1994; NA: November 1994 Game Boy Advance; NA: November 5, 2002; JP: November 14, 2002; EU: February 21, 2003
- Genre: Run and gun
- Modes: Single-player, multiplayer

Contra III: The Alien Wars (Note: Known in Japan as Contra Spirits (魂斗羅(コントラ)スピリッツ, Kontora Supirittsu)) is a 1992 run and gun video game developed and published by Konami for the Super Nintendo Entertainment System (SNES). It is the third home console entry in the Contra series after Contra (1988) and Super C (1990) for the Nintendo Entertainment System (NES). In PAL regions, it was retitled Super Probotector: Alien Rebels and the player characters were replaced with robots. The player is tasked with fighting off an alien invasion of Earth across six stages. Four stages feature side-scrolling action traditional to the series while two are presented from an overhead perspective. It is the first Contra title to have been directed by Nobuya Nakazato who later directed other games in the series. He designed Contra III to feature more comical elements, a more cinematic soundtrack, and tighter stage design than its predecessors.

Contra III received positive reviews, with critics praising its arcade quality derived from its sound and visual design. It has been called one of the best Contra games in retrospective reviews and is considered one of the greatest video games of all time. It was ported to the Game Boy as Contra: The Alien Wars (1994) by Factor 5 where it received positive reviews for its Super Game Boy enhancements. Konami also released a Game Boy Advance port titled Contra Advance: The Alien Wars EX (2002) which received more critical reviews for removing features in the original. The Super NES version was rereleased several times including the Super NES Classic Edition, Contra Anniversary Collection, and various online distribution services.

== Gameplay ==

Four stages are side-scrolling (top) while two are played from an overhead perspective (bottom).

Contra III is a side-scrolling run and gun game akin to the series' predecessors. Players take on the role of commandos Bill Rizer and Lance Bean fighting off an alien invasion on Earth. It can be played in single-player or a two-player cooperative mode. There are six stages in total; four are side-scrolling while two are presented in an overhead perspective using the Super NES's Mode 7 rendering mode. In the side-scrolling stages, the player progresses by running, jumping, and shooting at enemies. In the overhead stages, the player navigates across the stage to find and destroy predetermined targets. The stages each feature unique controls, giving the player the ability to rotate the screen to navigate. All stages have a boss at the end and occasionally a mid-stage boss. The player will lose a life by coming into contact with enemies or their projectiles, or falling down a pit.

The player is equipped with two machine guns that can be swapped at will and upgraded with power-ups. These power-ups are typically dropped from flying pods and include alternate shot types: homing missiles, torpedoes, a flamethrower, a laser, and a spread shot. Picking up a power-up will replace the shot type of the gun equipped, and losing a life will result in losing the power-up from the gun equipped. Bombs and a temporary barrier shield may also be dropped. The player has limited bombs, and using them will damage all enemies on the screen. The player can also perform a spinning jump, firing both guns in an aerial somersault. However, during this move, both of the player's weapons will be at risk of being lost upon losing a life.

The Japanese version of the game is easier than the other ones thanks to having unlimited continues and the final boss appearing when it is played on normal difficulty.

== Development ==
Contra III was developed by Konami with a team led by Nobuya Nakazato. Although this was Nakazato's third year at Konami, Contra III is the first Contra game he worked on, having only previously done informal playtesting for Super C (1990). He believed the original arcade version of Contra (1987) was difficult to play because of its vertical screen, but he did enjoy the Famicom port. Nakazato's team worked in Konami's new offices in Tokyo, seated next to the arcade team that had developed Contra. Nakazato shared progress on Contra III with the arcade team and received positive feedback. In early coverage, the game was known as Contra IV. (Note: It was also preannounced as Super Contra IV and Contra IV: The Alien Wars.) Nintendo Power reported the name change to Contra III in its coverage of Winter CES in 1992.

Nakazato believed Contra had a low-budget movie theme. To emphasize this, he asked the sound team to change the music as the stages progressed to give a cinematic style. He also believed the action in earlier Contra games is too realistic, so for Contra III he wanted to include more comical elements. He was concerned the change may upset series fans, but believed it would be more entertaining. One scene added to accomplish this is a sequence where the player hangs from flying missiles. This strains the Super NES's sprite capabilities, so the team used background tiles to draw the helicopter and missiles in the scene. Making the graphics appear to move like sprites in the foreground required clever programming tricks. The Super NES allowed for "raster scrolling", which allowed the programmers to change the graphics for each scanline. The programmers shifted the vertical sync and cut off the sprites at the scanline. The restriction is that graphics can only move horizontally along the scanline to achieve the illusion that they are actually sprites in the foreground.

Nakazato was concerned the traditional pattern of weak enemies followed by a boss fight was becoming mundane and did not want players to feel "in for the long haul" every play session. To combat this, he established a key concept for something interesting to happen every three screen scrolls. This made the game content feel more dense and gave it a "boss rush" type feel. Nakazato believed Contra III's fast-paced action was going against the trend of home console games shifting to slow-paced strategy and role-playing games, and is good for quick-starting stress relief.

Contra III was released in Japan on February 28, 1992, and North America on March 26. In Europe, the game was retitled Super Probotector: Alien Rebels and released on September 12, 1992. In Super Probotector, the gameplay and story remained mostly the same, but the designs of the player characters were changed to resemble robots. Due to technical differences in PAL Super NES systems, Super Probotector has a slightly slower framerate.

== Reception ==
Contemporary reception (SNES)

Review scores
Publication	Score
Computer and Video Games	91%
Electronic Gaming Monthly	9/10, 9/10, 9/10, 9/10
Famitsu	28/40
Mean Machines	95%
Zero	92%
Mega Zone	92%

Award
Publication	Award
Nintendo Power	Game of the Year (nominee)

The Super NES release of Contra III received considerable praise for its visuals and sound design. Its use of Mode 7, sprite scaling, and sprite rotation was commended for being well-integrated with the gameplay and not a gimmick. Electronic Gaming Monthly (EGM) wrote that these special effects pushed the limits of the Super NES hardware. Along with Computer and Video Games (CVG), they admired the use of Mode 7 on the top-down stages, with EGM extending their praise to the boss design on those stages. Both magazines also praised the soundtrack, with CVG calling it a combination of orchestral and rock music. Mean Machines wrote that the score rivaled that of ActRaiser (1990). Critics also praised the gun and explosion sound effects for enhancing the atmosphere, though Mean Machines believed they sometimes drowned out the music.

Critics found the gameplay enjoyable and a good challenge. CVG called it a cross between Strider (1989) and Midnight Resistance (1989), and enjoyed the athletic climbing ability of the characters. Along with EGM, they believed the top-down stages added good variety. Mean Machines called the game "ultra-addictive, arcade quality blasting action." EGM dubbed Contra III its "Game of the Month" and said it matched the quality of arcade games. Zero agreed, writing that "everything about this game speaks coin-op quality."

In retrospective reviews, IGN called it "arguably the best installment in the Contra series" and "one classic that deserves its place in the video game hall of fame". GameSpot also called it one of the best in the series. Both noted its satisfying level of difficulty but said the game was somewhat short compared to modern games. USgamer wrote that it was a good challenge and "practically synonymous with SNES ownership". Eurogamer called Contra III "exemplary" and debatably one of the best games in its genre. In 2009, Official Nintendo Magazine ranked the game 51st in a list of the greatest Nintendo games, calling it "Hectic, relentless and very challenging".

=== Accolades ===
In 1997 EGM ranked the Super NES version the 8th best console game of all time, remarking that "This game has everything: huge bosses, Mode 7 stages, ultradeep gameplay - all wrapped up in a beautifully atmospheric post-apocalyptic package." In 1995, Total! rated the game 15th on their "Top 100 SNES Games." Nintendo Power ranked it as the third best Super NES game of 1992. In 2018, Complex listed Contra III as the 21st best Super Nintendo game. They praised its intensity and wrote: "If not for [Contra: Hard Corps], this would be the best Contra in the entire series, by far." IGN ranked the game 24th in their "Top 100 SNES Games of All Time."

== Ports and rereleases ==
Contra III has been rereleased on Nintendo's online distribution services. It was released on the Wii Virtual Console in January 2007 in Japan and North America, and Super Probotector was released on the European Virtual Console the same month. Contra III was released again for the Wii U Virtual Console in Japan and North America in November 2013, and Europe received the unmodified Contra III on the Wii U in January 2014. In May 2016, Contra III was added to the Nintendo 3DS eShop for North America and Europe for exclusive use with the New Nintendo 3DS.

Contra III was included in the 2017 Super NES Classic dedicated console.

Both Contra III and Super Probotector were included in Contra: Anniversary Collection, a compilation of classic Contra games. It was released in June 2019 for the Nintendo Switch, PlayStation 4, Xbox One, and Windows. In addition to the Western releases, an option to play the Japanese version was added after launch in a free update. In Japan, the compilation initially came with the Japanese and European versions of the game without the North American Contra III.

=== Contra: The Alien Wars (Game Boy) ===
Contra: The Alien Wars (Game Boy) reception

Review scores
Publication	Score
Computer and Video Games	84%
Electronic Gaming Monthly	9/10, 8/10, 7/10, 7/10
Famitsu	19/40
GamesMaster	91%
Game Players	60%
Nintendo Magazine System	86%

Award
Publication	Award
VideoGames (1994)	Best Game Boy Game (runner-up)

Factor 5 developed a port for the Game Boy; it was released on September 23, 1994 in Japan, and in November in North America. The game was released in Europe in October as Probotector 2 with the player characters redrawn as robots. The game is mostly identical to the Super NES version but features some differences: some levels are missing, there is no ability to swap weapons, and there is no spinning attack. The game also features color graphics and improved sound when played through a Super Game Boy. Critics thought it was an excellent conversion of the Super NES version, with GamesMaster calling it "one hell of an achievement". Critics also extended their praise to the Super Game Boy enhancements, though Electronic Gaming Monthly criticized the control scheme using the Super NES controller.

=== Contra Advance: The Alien Wars EX (Game Boy Advance) ===
Contra Advance: The Alien Wars EX reception

Aggregate score
Aggregator	Score
Metacritic	70/100

Review scores
Publication	Score
Edge	5/10
Famitsu	27/40
GameSpot	7.4/10
IGN	7/10

At E3 2002, Konami announced the development of a remake of Contra III for the Game Boy Advance. The port was titled Contra Advance: The Alien Wars EX and released in November 2002 in Japan and North America, and February 2003 in Europe. The secondary weapon slot and bombs were omitted from the port, and the Mode 7 stages were replaced with side-scrolling stages from Contra: Hard Corps. Additionally, the game uses a password save system, and supports two-player cooperative gameplay by linking two systems with two carts. Contra Advance received "mixed or average" reviews per ratings aggregator Metacritic; IGN criticized the removal of the Mode 7 stages for eliminating variety and GameSpot was troubled by the weaponry changes. GameSpot wrote that players familiar with Contra III on the Super NES would be disappointed, but series newcomers may enjoy it. Edge explained that the "rote learning" of enemy attack patterns did not age well, and the game's action speed did not bode well on a handheld system. In November 2015, the game was added to the Wii U Virtual console in North America and Europe.

== Legacy ==
Contra III is director Nobuya Nakazato's first project in the Contra series, later acting as producer and director. Programmers Hideyuki Suganami and Mitsuru Yaida left Konami shortly after Contra III to work at the then-newly-founded Treasure, where they helped develop Gunstar Heroes (1993) and Alien Soldier (1995), which both expanded on the run and gun game formula defined in Contra III.
