= List of Koei games =

This is a list of video games developed and/or published by Koei, prior to its merger with Tecmo, or released by Tecmo Koei under the Koei label. Some games were only published by Koei in a specific region or for a specific platform; these games will only list the publisher relevant to this list and will be notated appropriately. Also, many games have different release dates for different regions, platforms, or re-releases. For the purposes of simplicity, and to ensure easy automated sorting, only the earliest date will listed on this table.

Year	Title	Developer	Publisher	Platforms
2011	100man-nin no Kiniro no Corda	Ruby Party	GREE/Koei	Windows, mobile phones
2010	100man-nin no Sangokushi	GREE/DeNA	Koei	Windows, mobile phones
1992	Aerobiz	Koei	Koei	SNES, Sega Genesis
1993	Aerobiz Supersonic	Koei	Koei	SNES, Mega Drive
1994	Angelique	Ruby Party	Koei	Super Famicom, Game Boy Advance
1998	Angelique Duet	Ruby Party	Koei	Saturn, PlayStation, Nintendo DS
2003	Angelique étoile	Ruby Party	Koei	Windows, PlayStation 2
1995	Angelique Special	Ruby Party	Koei	PC-FX, Windows, Saturn, PlayStation
1996	Angelique Special 2	Ruby Party	Koei	PC-FX, Windows, Saturn, PlayStation, Classic Mac OS
1998	Angelique Tenkū no Requiem	Ruby Party	Koei	PC-FX, PlayStation
2000	Angelique Trois	Ruby Party	Koei	PlayStation 2
1985	Aoki Ōkami to Shiroki Mejika	Koei	Koei	PC-88, PC-98, MSX
2004	Atelier Iris: Eternal Mana	Gust	Koei	PlayStation 2, mobile phones
2005	Atelier Iris 2: The Azoth of Destiny	Gust	Koei	PlayStation 2, mobile phones
2006	Atelier Iris 3: Grand Phantasm	Gust	Koei	PlayStation 2, mobile phones
1989	Bandit Kings of Ancient China	Koei	Koei	NES, MS-DOS, Amiga OS, Macintosh
2007	Bladestorm: The Hundred Years' War	Omega Force	Koei	PlayStation 3, Xbox 360
1994	Brandish	Nihon Falcom/Koei	Koei	SNES
1995	Celtic Tales: Balor of the Evil Eye	Koei	Koei	MS-DOS
2002	Crimson Sea	Koei	Koei	Xbox
2004	Crimson Sea 2	Koei	Koei	PlayStation 2
1999	Croc 2	Argonaut Games	Koei	PlayStation
2005	Colosseum: Road to Freedom	GOSHOW/Ertain	Koei	PlayStation 2
1996	Daikoukai Jidai III: Costa del Sol	Koei	Koei	Windows
1999	Daikoukai Jidai IV: Porto Estado	Koei	Koei	PlayStation, Windows, PlayStation Portable, Nintendo DS, mobile phones
1997	Daikoukai Jidai Gaiden	Koei	Koei	PlayStation, Saturn
1983	Danchi Zuma no Yuuwaku	Koei	Koei	FM-7, FM-8, MSX, PC-88, PC-98, Sharp X1
1998	Destrega	Omega Force	Koei	PlayStation
2004	Disgaea: Hour of Darkness	Nippon Ichi Software	Koei	PlayStation 2
2006	Disgaea 2: Cursed Memories	Nippon Ichi Software	Koei	PlayStation 2
2013	Dynasty Kingdoms	Koei	Koei	iOS
2002	Dynasty Tactics	Koei	Koei	PlayStation 2
2003	Dynasty Tactics 2	Koei	Koei	PlayStation 2
1997	Dynasty Warriors	Omega Force	Koei	PlayStation
2004	Dynasty Warriors	Omega Force	Koei	PlayStation Portable
2000	Dynasty Warriors 2	Omega Force	Koei	PlayStation 2
2001	Dynasty Warriors 3	Omega Force	Koei	PlayStation 2, Xbox
2002	Dynasty Warriors 3: Xtreme Legends	Omega Force	Koei	PlayStation 2
2003	Dynasty Warriors 4	Omega Force	Koei	PlayStation 2, Xbox
2004	Dynasty Warriors 4: Empires	Omega Force	Koei	PlayStation 2
2005	Dynasty Warriors 4 Hyper	Omega Force	Koei	Windows
2003	Dynasty Warriors 4: Xtreme Legends	Omega Force	Koei	PlayStation 2
2005	Dynasty Warriors 5	Omega Force	Koei	PlayStation 2, Xbox
2006	Dynasty Warriors 5: Empires	Omega Force	Koei	PlayStation 2, Xbox 360
2005	Dynasty Warriors 5 Special	Omega Force	Koei	Xbox 360, Windows
2005	Dynasty Warriors 5: Xtreme Legends	Omega Force	Koei	PlayStation 2
2007	Dynasty Warriors 6	Omega Force	Koei	PlayStation 2, Xbox 360, Windows
2009	Dynasty Warriors 6: Empires	Omega Force	Koei	PlayStation 3, PlayStation Portable, Xbox 360
2008	Dynasty Warriors 6 Special	Omega Force	Koei	PlayStation 2
2011	Dynasty Warriors 7	Omega Force	Koei	PlayStation 3, Xbox 360
2005	Dynasty Warriors Advance	Omega Force	JP: Koei WW: Nintendo	Game Boy Advance
2007	Dynasty Warriors DS: Fighter's Battle	Omega Force	Koei	Nintendo DS
2007	Dynasty Warriors: Gundam	Omega Force	Koei	PlayStation 3, Xbox 360
2008	Dynasty Warriors: Gundam 2	Omega Force	Koei	PlayStation 2, PlayStation 3, Xbox 360
2010	Dynasty Warriors: Gundam 3	Omega Force	Koei	PlayStation 3, Xbox 360
2008	Dynasty Warriors: Gundam Special	Omega Force	Koei	PlayStation 2
2006	Dynasty Warriors Mahjong	Omega Force	Koei	PlayStation 2, PlayStation Portable, Nintendo DS
2011	Dynasty Warriors Next	Omega Force	Koei	PlayStation Vita
2006	Dynasty Warriors Online	Omega Force	Koei	Windows, PlayStation 3
2009	Dynasty Warriors: Strikeforce	Omega Force	Koei	PlayStation Portable, PlayStation 3, Xbox 360
2010	Dynasty Warriors: Strikeforce 2	Omega Force	Koei	PlayStation Portable
2006	Dynasty Warriors Vol. 2	Omega Force	Koei	PlayStation Portable
2007	Fatal Inertia	Koei Canada	Koei	PlayStation 3, Xbox 360
2001	G1 Jockey	Koei	Koei	PlayStation 2
2001	G1 Jockey 2	Koei	Koei	PlayStation 2
2003	G1 Jockey 3	Koei	Koei	PlayStation 2
2005	G1 Jockey 4	Koei	Koei	PlayStation 2
2007	G1 Jockey 4 2007	Koei	Koei	PlayStation 2, PlayStation 3
1991	Gemfire	Koei	Koei	MSX, NES, Super NES, Mega Drive/Genesis, MS-DOS, PC-98, FM Towns, X68000, PC-88, Windows
1987	Genghis Khan	Koei	Koei	MSX, NES, Amiga, MS-DOS
1992	Genghis Khan II: Clan of the Gray Wolf	Koei	Koei	PC-88, PC-98, MSX2, X68000, SNES, Mega Drive, MS-DOS
1998	Genghis Khan: Aoki Ookami to Shiroki Mejika IV	Koei	Koei	Windows, PlayStation
2001	Gitaroo Man	iNiS/Koei	Koei	PlayStation 2, PlayStation Portable
2006	Gitaroo Man Lives!	iNiS/Koei	Koei	PlayStation Portable
2000	Harukanaru Toki no Naka de	Ruby Party	Koei	PlayStation
2001	Harukanaru Toki no Naka de 2	Ruby Party	Koei	PlayStation 2
2004	Harukanaru Toki no Naka de 3	Ruby Party	Koei	PlayStation 2
2005	Harukanaru Toki no Naka de 3 izayoiki	Ruby Party	Koei	PlayStation 2
2006	Harukanaru Toki no Naka de 3 unmei no rabirinsu	Ruby Party	Koei	PlayStation 2
2008	Harukanaru Toki no Naka de 4	Ruby Party	Koei	PlayStation 2
2011	Harukanaru Toki no Naka de 5	Ruby Party	Koei	PlayStation 2
2012	Harukanaru Toki no Naka de 5 kazahanaki	Ruby Party	Koei	PlayStation 2
2003	Harukanaru Toki no Naka de Banjo Yugi	Ruby Party	Koei	PlayStation
2005	Harukanaru Toki no Naka de Hachiyosho	Ruby Party	Koei	PlayStation 2
2005	Harukanaru Toki no Naka de Hisutori	Ruby Party	Koei	PlayStation 2
2006	Harukanaru Toki no Naka de Maihitoyo	Ruby Party	Koei	PlayStation 2
2008	Harukanaru Toki no Naka de Yume no Ukihashi	Ruby Party	Koei	Nintendo DS
2009	Harukanaru Toki no Naka de Yume no Ukihashi Special	Ruby Party	Koei	PlayStation 2
1997	Heir of Zendor	Koei	Koei	Saturn
2001	Hermina and Culus: Atelier Lilie Another Story	Gust	Koei	PlayStation 2
2010	Hyakuman-nin no Nobunaga no Yabō	Mobage	Koei	Windows
1991	Inindo: Way of the Ninja	Koei	Koei	PC-88, PC-98, MSX2, FM Towns, X68000, MS-DOS (Chinese), SNES, Windows 98
1988	Ishin no Arashi	Koei	Koei	PC-88, PC-98, NES, Saturn, PlayStation, X68000, MSX, FM-7, FM Towns, X1
1998	Ishin no Arashi: Bakumatsu Shishiden	Koei	Koei	Windows, PlayStation, mobile phones
2010	Ishin no Arashi: Shippū Ryūmaden	Koei	Koei	Nintendo DS
1993	Kamigami no Daichi Kojiki Gaiden	Koei	Koei	FM Towns, PC-9801
2000	Kessen	Koei	Koei	PlayStation 2
2001	Kessen II	Koei	Koei	PlayStation 2
2004	Kessen III	Koei	Koei	PlayStation 2
2003	Kin'iro no Corda	Ruby Party	Koei	Windows, PlayStation 2, PlayStation Portable
2007	Kin'iro no Corda 2	Ruby Party	Koei	PlayStation 2
2007	Kin'iro no Corda 2 encore	Ruby Party	Koei	PlayStation 2
2009	Kin'iro no Corda 2 f	Ruby Party	Koei	PlayStation Portable
2009	Kin'iro no Corda 2 f encore	Ruby Party	Koei	PlayStation Portable
2010	Kin'iro no Corda 3	Ruby Party	Koei	PlayStation 2, PlayStation Portable, mobile phones
2001	Kurogane no Houkou: Warship Commander	Microcabin	Koei	PlayStation 2, Windows
2005	La Pucelle: Tactics	Nippon Ichi Software	Koei	PlayStation 2, PlayStation Portable
1993	Leading Company	Koei	Koei	FM Towns, PC-98, X68000, Super Famicom
1991	L'Empereur	Koei	Koei	NES
1994	Liberty or Death	Koei	Koei	MS-DOS, Super NES, Genesis/Mega Drive
2009	LoveφSummit	Ruby Party	Koei/CWS Brains	Mobile phones
2005	Makai Kingdom: Chronicles of the Sacred Tome	Nippon Ichi Software	Nippon Ichi Software/Koei	PlayStation 2, PlayStation Portable
1997	Mahjong 64	Chat Noir	Koei	Nintendo 64
2011	MISS PRINCESS: Miss Puri!	Ruby Party	Koei	Nintendo DS
2008	Mobile Shin Sangokumusō	Koei	Koei	Mobile phones
2009	Monster Racers	Koei	Koei	Nintendo DS
1997	Mouri Motonari: Chikai no Sanshi	Koei	Koei	Windows, Saturn, PlayStation
2009	Musou Orochi Z	Omega Force	Koei	PlayStation 3, Windows
2002	Mystic Heroes	Koei	Koei	GameCube, PlayStation 2
2002	Naval Ops: Commander	Microcabin	Koei	PlayStation 2, Windows
2003	Naval Ops: Warship Gunner	Microcabin	Koei	PlayStation 2
2006	Naval Ops: Warship Gunner 2	Koei	Koei	PlayStation 2, PlayStation Portable
2008	Neo Angelique ~Abyss~	Ruby Party	Koei	PlayStation 2
1982	Night Life	Koei	Koei	PC-88
1986	Nobunaga's Ambition	Koei	Koei	PC-88, Famicom, Super Famicom, Mega Drive, PC Engine Super CD-ROM², PlayStation, mobile phones, Windows, iOS, Wii, Wii U
1988	Nobunaga's Ambition II	Koei	Koei	Famicom, PlayStation, Saturn, MS-DOS, mobile phones
1990	Nobunaga's Ambition: Lord of Darkness	Koei	Koei	Family Computer, Super Famicom, Mega Drive, PC Engine Super CD-ROM², PlayStation, Windows, Game Boy Advance, mobile phones
1983	Nobunaga no Yabō	Koei	Koei	Windows, Saturn, Game Boy, Game Boy Color, WonderSwan, PlayStation, Nintendo DS, Nintendo 3DS, mobile phones
1992	Nobunaga no Yabō: Haōden	Koei	Koei	Family Computer, Super Famicom, PlayStation, Windows, Mega-CD, 3DO, Mac OS, mobile phones
1998	Nobunaga no Yabō Internet	Koei	Koei	Windows
2005	Nobunaga no Yabō: Kakushin	Koei	Koei	Windows, PlayStation 2, Wii
2003	Nobunaga no Yabō Online	Koei	Koei	Windows, PlayStation 2, PlayStation 3
2001	Nobunaga no Yabō: Ranseiki	Koei	Koei	Windows, PlayStation 2, Xbox
1999	Nobunaga no Yabō: Reppūden	Koei	Koei	Dreamcast, Windows, PlayStation, PlayStation Portable, Macintosh, Nintendo DS, mobile phones
1997	Nobunaga no Yabō: Shōseiroku	Koei	Koei	Dreamcast, Saturn, PlayStation, PlayStation Portable, Macintosh, mobile phones
2002	Nobunaga no Yabō: Sōtensoku	Koei	Koei	Windows, PlayStation 2, PlayStation Portable
2009	Nobunaga no Yabō: Tendō	Koei	Koei	Windows, PlayStation 3, Xbox 360
2003	Nobunaga no Yabō: Tenka Sōsei	Koei	Koei	Windows, PlayStation 2
1994	Nobunaga no Yabō: Tenshōki	Koei	Koei	PC-98, FM Towns, DOS/V, Super Famicom, Saturn, PlayStation, PlayStation Portable, Macintosh, mobile phones
2013	Nobunaga's Ambition: Sphere of Influence	Koei	Koei	PlayStation 3, PlayStation 4, PlayStation Vita, Windows, Nintendo Switch
1998	Oda Nobunaga Den	Koei	Koei	Windows, PlayStation
1993	Operation Europe: Path to Victory	Koei	Koei	FM Towns, MS-DOS, PC-98, Genesis, Super NES
2007	Opoona	ArtePiazza	Koei	Wii
2008	Persona 3	Atlus	NA/JP: Atlus EU: Koei	PlayStation 2, PlayStation Portable
2008	Persona 3 FES	Atlus	NA/JP: Atlus EU: Koei	PlayStation 2
2004	Phantom Brave	Nippon Ichi Software	Koei	PlayStation 2, Wii, PlayStation Portable, Windows
2008	Pop Cutie! Street Fashion Simulation	Koei	Koei	Nintendo DS
2008	Prey the Stars	Koei	Koei	Nintendo DS
1994	Progenitor	Koei	Koei	PC-9801
1992	P.T.O.: Pacific Theater of Operations	Koei	Koei	Mega Drive, SNES
1995	P.T.O. II: Pacific Theater of Operations	Koei	Koei	SNES
2002	P.T.O. IV: Pacific Theater of Operations	Koei	Koei	PlayStation 2, Windows
1993	Rise of the Phoenix	Koei	Koei	SNES, PC-98, FM Towns, X68000, PlayStation
1985	Romance of the Three Kingdoms	Koei	Koei	Amiga, MSX, MSX2, NES, Windows
2010	Romance of the Three Kingdoms 2	Koei	Koei	iOS
1989	Romance of the Three Kingdoms II	Koei	Koei	Amiga, MSX2, NES, SNES, Genesis, Windows, Genesis, WonderSwan
1992	Romance of the Three Kingdoms III: Dragon of Destiny	Koei	Koei	SNES, Genesis, Windows
1994	Romance of the Three Kingdoms IV: Wall of Fire	Koei	Koei	SNES, Sega 32X, Saturn, PlayStation, Windows, Game Boy Advance
1996	Romance of the Three Kingdoms V	Koei	Koei	Amiga, MSX2, NES, SNES, Genesis, Windows, Genesis, WonderSwan
1998	Romance of the Three Kingdoms VI: Awakening of the Dragon	Koei	Koei	Dreamcast, PlayStation, Windows
2000	Romance of the Three Kingdoms VII	Koei	Koei	PlayStation 2, Windows
2001	Romance of the Three Kingdoms VIII	Koei	Koei	PlayStation 2, Windows
2003	Romance of the Three Kingdoms IX	Koei	Koei	PlayStation 2, Windows
2004	Romance of the Three Kingdoms X	Koei	Koei	PlayStation 2, Windows
2006	Romance of the Three Kingdoms XI	Koei	Koei	PlayStation 2, Windows, Wii
2012	Romance of the Three Kingdoms XII	Koei	Koei	PlayStation 3, Windows, Wii U
2009	Romance of the Three Kingdoms Touch	Koei	Koei	iOS
2008	Saihai no Yukue	Omega Force	Koei	Nintendo DS
1999	Saiyuki: Journey West	Koei	Koei	PlayStation
2011	Samurai Cats	Koei	Koei	Windows
2004	Samurai Warriors	Omega Force	Koei	PlayStation 2, Xbox
2011	Samurai Warriors: Chronicles	Omega Force	Koei	Nintendo 3DS
2014	Samurai Warriors: Chronicles 3	Omega Force	Koei	PlayStation Vita, Nintendo 3DS
2007	Samurai Warriors: Katana	Omega Force	Koei	Wii
2004	Samurai Warriors: Xtreme Legends	Omega Force	Koei	PlayStation 2
2005	Samurai Warriors: State of War	Omega Force	Koei	PlayStation Portable
2006	Samurai Warriors 2	Omega Force	Koei	PlayStation 2, Xbox 360, Windows
2006	Samurai Warriors 2: Empires	Omega Force	Koei	PlayStation 2, Xbox 360, Windows
2007	Samurai Warriors 2: Xtreme Legends	Omega Force	Koei	PlayStation 2, Xbox 360, Windows
2009	Samurai Warriors 3	Omega Force	JP: Koei WW: Nintendo	Wii
2002	Sangokushi Battlefield	Koei	Koei	Windows
1995	Sangokushi Eiketsuden	Koei	Koei	Windows, SNES, Game Boy Advance, PlayStation, MS-DOS, Saturn
1999	Sangokushi Internet	Koei	Koei	Windows
1996	Sangokushi Koumeiden	Koei	Koei	Windows, PlayStation, Saturn, Game Boy Advance
2002	Sangokushi Mobile	Koei	Koei	Mobile phones
2004	Sangokushi Mobile 2	Koei	Koei	Mobile phones
2006	Sangokushi Mobile 3	Koei	Koei	Mobile phones
2008	Sangokushi Mobile 4	Koei	Koei	Mobile phones
2008	Sangokushi Online	Koei	Koei	Mobile phones
1991	Sangokushi Retsuden: Ransei no Eiyū Tachi	Sega	Sega/Koei	SMD
1998	Sangokushi Sousouden	Koei	Koei	Windows, mobile phones
2011	Sengoku Musō 3: Mōshōden	Omega Force	Koei	Wii
2011	Sengoku Musō 3 Z	Omega Force	Koei	PlayStation 3
2012	Sengoku Musō 3 Z Special	Omega Force	Koei	PlayStation 3
1997	Söldnerschild	Sega	Koei	Saturn
1998	Söldnerschild Special	Koei	Koei	PlayStation
1997	Soul Master	Koei	Koei	PlayStation
1994	Stop That Roach!	Koei	Koei	Game Boy
1992	Taikō Risshiden	Koei	Koei	PC-98, Super Famicom, Genesis/Mega Drive, Wii
1996	Taikō Risshiden II	Koei	Koei	Windows, PlayStation
1999	Taikō Risshiden III	Koei	Koei	Windows, PlayStation
2001	Taikō Risshiden IV	Koei	Koei	Windows, PlayStation Portable
2004	Taikō Risshiden V	Koei	Koei	Windows, PlayStation Portable
1993	Tamashii no Mon: Dante no Shinkyoku yori	Koei	Koei	FM Towns, PC-98
1996	Teitoku no Ketsudan III	Koei	Koei	PC-9801, Windows, PlayStation, Saturn
1990	Top Management	Koei	Koei	Famicom, PC-98
1994	Top Management II	Koei	Koei	Super Famicom, PC-98, Windows
2010	Trinity: Souls of Zill O'll	Omega Force	Koei	PlayStation 3
1991	Uncharted Waters	Koei	Koei	MSX, NES, Sega Mega Drive, SNES
1994	Uncharted Waters: New Horizons	Koei	Koei	PC-98, SNES, Mega Drive/Genesis, PC, Saturn, PlayStation, Virtual Console, mobile phones
2010	Uncharted Waters Online	Koei	Koei	Windows
2007	Warriors Orochi	Omega Force	Koei	PlayStation 2, Xbox 360, Windows, PlayStation Portable
2008	Warriors Orochi 2	Omega Force	Koei	PlayStation 2, PlayStation Portable, Xbox 360
2012	Warriors Orochi 3	Omega Force	Koei	PlayStation 3, Xbox 360
2012	Warriors Orochi 3 Hyper	Omega Force	Koei	Wii U
2012	Warriors Orochi 3 Special	Omega Force	Koei	PlayStation Portable
2013	Warriors Orochi 3 Ultimate	Omega Force	Koei	PlayStation 3, PlayStation Vita, PlayStation 4, Xbox One, Nintendo Switch
1999	WinBack: Covert Operations	Omega Force	Koei	Nintendo 64, PlayStation 2
1993	Winning Post	Koei	Koei	X68000, Super Famicom, Mega-CD, PC98, 3DO, PlayStation, Saturn, Game Boy Advance
1995	Winning Post 2	Koei	Koei	Super Famicom, PlayStation, Saturn
1997	Winning Post 3	Koei	Koei	PlayStation, Saturn
1999	Winning Post 4	Koei	Koei	PlayStation, Dreamcast
2001	Winning Post 5	Koei	Koei	PlayStation 2
2003	Winning Post 6	Koei	Koei	PlayStation 2, PlayStation Portable, Windows
2005	Winning Post 7	Koei	Koei	PlayStation 2, PlayStation 3, Windows, Wii, PlayStation Vita
2007	Winning Post 7 Maximum 2007	Koei	Koei	PlayStation 2, PlayStation 3
2008	Winning Post 7 Maximum 2008	Koei	Koei	PlayStation 2, PlayStation 3, Windows, Wii
2001	Yanya Caballista: City Skater	Koei	Koei	PlayStation 2
2005	Zill O'll ~infinite~	Koei	Koei	PlayStation 2
2009	Zill O'll ~infinite plus~	Omega Force	Koei	PlayStation Portable
1999	Zill O'll	Koei	Koei	PlayStation

== See also ==
- List of Koei Tecmo games
- List of Tecmo games
