= List of media adaptations of Romance of the Three Kingdoms =

The following is a list of media adaptations of Luo Guanzhong's 14th century novel Romance of the Three Kingdoms, one of the Four Great Classical Novels of Chinese literature. The story has been adapted in numerous forms, including films, television series, manga and video games.

== Novels ==
- Fan Sanguo Yanyi (反三國演義; literally Reverse (of) Romance of the Three Kingdoms) is an alternate history novel written around 1919 by Zhou Dahuang (周大荒; 1886–1951) and first published as a serial in the newspaper Min De Bao (民德報) in 1924. In 1930, it was compiled and published as a complete novel by the Shanghai Qingyun Book Company (上海卿雲書局). The novel tells an alternate history from the point where Xu Shu was forced to leave Liu Bei and join Cao Cao. With Zhao Yun's help, Xu Shu saved his mother, escaped from Cao Cao and returned to Liu Bei. As the story progresses, Liu Bei eventually defeated Cao Cao and reunified China under his rule. Other significant changes include: Zhao Yun and Ma Chao leading Liu Bei's forces in the final battles against Cao Cao; Pang Tong averting his fate at the Valley of the Fallen Phoenix and continuing to serve Liu Bei alongside Zhuge Liang; Zhou Yu having a more "righteous" personality and being supportive of Sun Shangxiang's marriage to Liu Bei; Zhao Yun's marriage to Ma Yunlu, a fictional sister of Ma Chao.
- Mie Shu Ji (滅蜀記; literally The Tale of the Destruction of Shu) is a 2008 novel by Li Bo (李柏) which dramatises the events leading to the fall of Shu Han, with Jiang Wei, Deng Ai and Zhong Hui as the main characters.

== Chinese manhua ==
- Jiaqingqu (嫁情曲) by Lü Xiangru (呂相儒).
- The Ravages of Time, by Chan Mou, retells the events in Romance of the Three Kingdoms with Sima Yi as the central character. The drawing style is dark and grim, and while the main story is kept intact, the finer details are dramatised.
- Romance of the Three Kingdoms (三国演义) published by Asiapac Books. The 10 volume graphic novel series is in English.
- Sanguo Shenbing (三國神兵) by Ip Ming-fat (葉明發).
- Sanguo Wushuang (三國無雙) and Sanguo Wushuang Zhuan (三國無雙傳) illustrated by Heui Ging-sam (许景琛). It is adapted from Koei's video game series Dynasty Warriors.
- Sanguo Wushuang Mengjiang Zhuan (三國猛將傳) by Liu Gwong-jou (廖光祖).
- Sanguo Yanyi (三國演義) by Sun Jiayu (孫家裕)
- Sanguo Yingxiong Zhuan (三国英雄传) by Tung Yin-ming (童彦明).
- Shuyun Canglong Ji (蜀雲藏龍記) by Lin Mingfeng (林明鋒).
- Three Kingdoms by Lee Chi Ching. Lee also drew a spinoff manhua series titled Battle of Red Cliffs (赤壁之戰). He also illustrated the 13-volume manhua Zhuge Kongming.
- Wuba Sanguo (武霸三國) by Yongren (永仁) and Cai Jingdong (蔡景東)
- Soul Buster (武霸三國) by Bai Mao.

== Japanese manga ==
Romance of the Three Kingdoms has been adapted into several Japanese manga, with varying degrees of historical accuracy and faithfulness to the original story and popular tradition. Some of the more widely read manga in Japan include:

- Blade Sangokushi (ブレイド三国志) is a manga by Ichikawa Ryūnosuke (壱河 柳乃助).
- Dragon Sister! (DRAGON SISTER！三國志 百花繚乱, Sangokushi Hyakka Ryōran) by Nini.
- Gogo Gentoku-kun!! (GOGO玄徳くん), a gag comedy manga, and its sequels Zoku Gogo Gentoku-kun!! (続・GOGO玄徳くん) and Zokuzoku Gogo Gentoku-kun!! (続続・GOGO玄徳くん) by Shirai Eriko (白井 惠理子). (Note: Gentoku is a Japanese pronunciation for Xuande.)
- Ikki Tousen is loosely based on the novel, but the characters in the story refer to the names in the Japanese version of the book. In the series, most characters appear to have similar fates as characters with the same names from the original story.
- Koutou no Akatsuki (江東の暁). (Note: Koutou is a Japanese pronunciation for Jiangdong by Takaguchi Rinrin (滝口 琳琳))
- Lord by Ryoichi Ikegami and Buronson is very loosely based on the novel. In the series, a general from the Nakoku country becomes Liu Bei.
- Magical Musou Tenshi Tsuki Irase!! Ryofuko-chan (まじかる無双天使 突き刺せ!! 呂布子ちゃん) (Note: Ryofu is a Japanese pronunciation for Lü Bu.) by Suzuki Jiro (铃木 次郎). The anime Yawaraka Sangokushi Tsukisase!! Ryofuko-chan is adapted from it.
- Ouja no Yuugi by Iori Tabasa, with Guo Jia as the protagonist.
- Qwan (Media Factory) and its spinoff Foreign Grass by Aki Shimizu.
- Ryūrōden by Yoshito Yamahara (Kodansha).
- Sangokushi (Japanese for Records of the Three Kingdoms) by Yokoyama Mitsuteru (Ushio Shuppansha). The anime Yokoyama Mitsuteru Sangokushi is adapted from it.
- The novel serves as the model for SD Gundam Sangokuden: Romance of the Three Kingdoms, a manga/model kit line in the long running Musha Gundam SD Gundam series.
- Shin Sangokushi (新三国志) by Yamazaki Hiromi (山崎 拓味).
- Sōten Kōro by King Gonta (Kodansha).
- Soushoku-kei Danshi by Nekokurage
- Sousou Moutoku Seiden (Note: Sousou Moutoku is the Japanese pronunciation of Cao Cao Mengde.) by Ōnishi Kōichi (大西 巷一).
- Tenchi o Kurau by Motomiya Hiroshi (Shueisha).
- Ya Boy Kongming! by Yuto Yotsuba (Kodansha)

== Korean manhwa ==
- Ko Woo-yeong Samgukji (고우영 삼국지/고우영 三國志) by Ko Woo-yeong (고우영)
- Samgukji Gahujeon (삼국지 가후전/三國志 賈詡傳) by Masatokki (마사토끼) / Bea Min-su (배민수)
- Samgukjeontugi (삼국전투기/三國戰鬪記) by Choi Hun (최훈)
- Yeoja Jegalryang (여자제갈량/女子諸葛亮) by Kimdal (김달)

== Film ==
- Dingjun Mountain was a 1905 Chinese film directed by Ren Jingfeng (任景丰). The only print was destroyed in a fire in the 1940s. The plot is based on the Battle of Mount Dingjun as described in Romance of the Three Kingdoms.
- The Witty Sorcerer is a 1931 Hong Kong film directed by, and starring Lai Man-Wai. The plot is based on a story in Romance of the Three Kingdoms about Zuo Ci playing tricks on Cao Cao.
- Diao Chan is a 1938 Chinese sound film directed by Bu Wancang. The story centres on Diaochan.
- Three Kingdoms: Resurrection of the Dragon is a 2008 Hong Kong film directed by Daniel Lee. The plot centres on the story of Zhao Yun and is loosely based on stories about Zhao Yun in Romance of the Three Kingdoms. Andy Lau starred as Zhao Zilong (Zhao Yun) while Maggie Q portrayed the antagonist Cao Ying, a fictional granddaughter of Cao Cao.
- Red Cliff is a 2008 two-part Chinese film directed by John Woo. The plot is based on the Battle of Red Cliffs and features reenactments of stories in Romance of the Three Kingdoms along with epic battle scenes.
- The Lost Bladesman is a 2011 Hong Kong film directed by Alan Mak and Felix Chong. The plot is loosely based on the story in Romance of the Three Kingdoms about Guan Yu crossing five passes and slaying six generals. Donnie Yen portrayed Guan Yu.
- The Assassins is a 2012 Chinese film directed by Zhao Linshan. The story is loosely based on two attempts on Cao Cao's life – one by the physician Ji Ben (or Ji Ping) and the other by Empress Fu Shou and her father Fu Wan. Chow Yun-fat portrayed Cao Cao.
- Dynasty Warriors is a 2021 Hong Kong film adapted from Koei Tecmo's video game franchise of the same title, which in turn is based on Romance of the Three Kingdoms.
- Three Kingdoms: Starlit Heroes is a 2025 Chinese CGI-animated film produced by Guomai Culture Media, Beijing Enlight Media, Haiping Wuji Film, Television Culture (Shanghai) and Shanghai Tingdong Film Industry. The film focuses on Cao Cao, from his campaign against Dong Zhuo and welcoming of the emperor to the Battle of Guandu against Yuan Shao.
- Three Kingdoms: The Beginning is a 2026 Chinese CGI-animated film produced by Light Chaser Animation Studios. The film focuses on Cao Cao's perspective of the early events of the novel, from the corruption and struggle in Luoyang, the rise of Dong Zhuo to the coalition against Dong Zhuo led by Yuan Shao.

== Television ==
=== Animation ===
- Sangokushi, a Japanese anime special released in 1982.
- Sangokushi (三国志; 1985) and its sequel Sangokushi II: Amakakeru Otoko-tachi (三国志II 天翔ける英雄(おとこ)たち; 1986) are anime television specials produced by Shin-Ei Animation.
- Sangokushi is a three-part Japanese anime film series produced and released by Toei Animation between 1992 and 1994 (Sangokushi (1): Eiyū-tachi no Yoake (三国志（第1部） 英雄たちの夜明け), Sangokushi (2) Chōkō Moyu! (三国志（第2部） 長江燃ゆ！), and Sangokushi (3) Harukanaru Taichi (三国志（第3部） 遥かなる大地)). The theme song "Fūshi Hana-den" (風姿花伝) was performed by Tanimura Shinji.
- Yokoyama Mitsuteru Sangokushi is a Japanese anime series which ran for 47 episodes on TV Tokyo between 1991 and 1992 with Liu Bei as the protagonist. It focused on the stories before the Battle of Red Cliffs.
- Giant Robo: The Day the Earth Stood Still is a Japanese anime released in 1992 that features Zhuge Liang as the main villain.
- Chūka Ichiban! is a Japanese anime released in 1997 that features Zhuge Liang and one of his fictional descendants called Luo Kong in a cooking battle.
- Ikkitousen is a five-season Japanese anime loosely based on the manga. The five seasons were released between 2003 and 2011.
- Gin Tama is a Japanese anime released in 2006 that has references from Romance of the Three Kingdoms.
- Kōtetsu Sangokushi is a shounen-ai anime released in 2007 in Japan. It featured homosexual relationships between some of the male characters in the novel with Lu Xun as the protagonist.
- Yawaraka Sangokushi Tsukisase!! Ryofuko-chan is a Japanese anime based on Romance of the Three Kingdoms released in 2007–2008 with Lü Bu as the protagonist.
- Koihime Musō is a Japanese anime based on Romance of the Three Kingdoms released in 2008–2010 with Guan Yu as the protagonist.
- Sōten Kōro is a Japanese anime based on Romance of the Three Kingdoms released in 2009 with Cao Cao as the protagonist.
- Romance of the Three Kingdoms is a 2009 Chinese-Japanese co-produced animation.
- SD Gundam Sangokuden Brave Battle Warriors is a Japanese anime adaptation of the SD Gundam model kit series BB Senshi Sangokuden which began airing on 3 April 2010.
- Juuza Engi: Engetsu Sangokuden - Gaiden Youzhou Genya is a Japanese anime released in 2014 and based on Romance of the Three Kingdoms with Guan Yu as the protagonist.
- Fist of the Blue Sky is a Japanese anime released in 2006 and the prequel of Fist of the North Star that describes the origin of the martial art known as Hokuto Shinken and its branch schools before and during the age of the Three Kingdoms of China.
- Prison School is a Japanese anime released in 2015 that features a Japanese character called Morokuzu Takehito who has an otaku interest in the war of the Three Kingdoms of China.
- Soul Buster is a Japanese anime based on the Chinese manhua with the same name released in 2016.
- SD Gundam World Sangoku Soketsuden is a Japanese anime released in 2019–2021.
- Record of Ragnarok is a Japanese anime released in 2021 that features Lü Bu.
- Fantasia Sango - Realm of Legends is a Japanese anime released in 2022 and based on the Taiwanese RPG video game series Fantasia Sango.
- Ya Boy Kongming! is a Japanese anime that features Zhuge Liang as a main protagonist released in 2022.

=== Live action ===
- God of River Lok is a 1975 Hong Kong television series produced by TVB. The story is based on the life of Lady Zhen and folktales about her romantic entanglements with Cao Pi and Cao Zhi.
- Three Kingdoms is a 1976 Hong Kong television series produced by RTV (now ATV). It follows the story of Liu Bei, Guan Yu and Zhang Fei in the novel, starting from the Oath of the Peach Garden and ending with Liu Bei's death.
- The Legendary Prime Minister – Zhuge Liang is a 1985 Hong Kong television series produced by ATV. It is based on the life of Zhuge Liang and features a fictional romance between Zhuge Liang and Xiao Qiao.
- Zhuge Liang is a 1985 Chinese television series based on the life of Zhuge Liang.
- Romance of the Three Kingdoms is a 1994 Chinese television series produced by CCTV.
- Guan Gong is a 1996 Taiwanese television series which centres on the story of Guan Yu and incorporates elements of fantasy and Chinese mythology.
- Cao Cao is a 1999 Chinese live-action television series centered on Cao Cao.
- Lü Bu and Diaochan is a 2001 Chinese television series directed by Chen Kaige. It is loosely based on the romance between Lü Bu and Diaochan and takes many liberties with the original story.
- Where the Legend Begins is a 2002 Hong Kong television series produced by TVB. The story is similar to God of River Lok (1975).
- The Legend of Guan Gong is a 2004 Chinese television series based on the life of Guan Yu.
- K.O.3an Guo is a 2009 Taiwanese television drama that spoofs Romance of the Three Kingdoms in a modern high school setting. It starred several Taiwanese teen idols, including members of the bands Wu Hu Jiang and Fahrenheit.
- Three Kingdoms is a 2010 Chinese television series directed by Gao Xixi.
- Three Kingdoms RPG is a 2012 Hong Kong television series produced by TVB. The story is about a young game addict in Hong Kong who accidentally travels back in time to the Three Kingdoms era.
- Legend of Goddess Luo is a 2013 Chinese television series based on Lady Zhen's romantic entanglements with Cao Cao, Cao Pi and Cao Zhi.
- Cao Cao is a 2014 Chinese television series based on the life of Cao Cao before the Battle of Red Cliffs. Directed by Hu Mei, it aims to revise Cao Cao's traditional image as a villain and portray him in a more historically accurate manner.
- God of War, Zhao Yun is a 2016 Chinese television series loosely based on the life of Zhao Yun (Zhao Zilong) and introducing numerous other fictional characters and elements. It starred cast members from mainland China, South Korea and Taiwan.
- The Advisors Alliance is a 2017 two-part Chinese television series loosely based on the life of Sima Yi.
- Secret of the Three Kingdoms is a 2018 Chinese television series adapted from a novel by Ma Boyong and produced by Tangren Media. It tells the story of Liu Ping, a fictional twin brother of Liu Xie (Emperor Xian).
- The Wind Blows From Longxi is a 2022 Chinese television series set during Zhuge Liang's Northern Expeditions.
- Unified Three Kingdoms is a 2022 Chinese live-action television series that tells the story of the unification of the Three Kingdoms of China.
- Man of the Times is an upcoming Chinese television series centered on Cao Cao.

== Video games ==
=== Romance of the Three Kingdoms ===
- Romance of the Three Kingdoms is a series of 14 computerised strategy war games produced by Koei. The PC versions of V through X were released only in Asia, along with "power-up kits" for some of them. The series is also released on other video game consoles such as PlayStation 2, Super NES, NES, Sega Saturn, and Sega Genesis outside of Asia.
  - Romance of the Three Kingdoms was released in 1985.
  - Romance of the Three Kingdoms II was released in 1989.
  - Romance of the Three Kingdoms III: Dragon of Destiny was released on 8 November 1992.
  - Romance of the Three Kingdoms IV: Wall of Fire was released on 9 December 1994.
  - Romance of the Three Kingdoms V was released on 27 September 1996.
  - Sangokushi Kōmeiden was released in 1996.
  - Sangokushi Sōsōden was released on 11 December 1998.
  - Sangokushi Internet was released in 1999.
  - Romance of the Three Kingdoms VI: Awakening of the Dragon was released on 1 April 2000.
  - Romance of the Three Kingdoms VII was released on 1 February 2001.
  - Romance of the Three Kingdoms VIII was released on 29 June 2001.
  - Sangokushi Battlefield was released in 2002.
  - Romance of the Three Kingdoms IX was released on 24 February 2004.
  - Romance of the Three Kingdoms X was released on 22 June 2005.
  - Sangokushi DS was released on 23 February 2006.
  - Romance of the Three Kingdoms XI was released on 6 February 2007.
  - Sangokushi DS 2 was released on 11 November 2007.
  - Sangokushi Online was released in 2007.
  - Romance of the Three Kingdoms Touch was released in 2009.
  - Romance of the Three Kingdoms XII was released on 20 April 2012.
  - Sangokushi 2 was released on 6 August 2015.
  - Yo-kai Sangokushi was released in 2015.
  - Romance of the Three Kingdoms XIII was released on 28 January 2016.
  - Romance of the Three Kingdoms XIV was released on 16 January 2020.

=== Dynasty Warriors ===
- Dynasty Warriors is a series of tactical action hack and slash video games by Koei and Omega Force. The series has been released for PlayStation 2, PlayStation 3, PlayStation 4, PlayStation 5, PlayStation Portable, PlayStation Vita, Xbox, Xbox 360, Xbox One, Xbox Series X/S, Game Boy Advance, Nintendo DS, Nintendo Switch, Nintendo Switch 2 and personal computers. It has also generated the spinoff Dynasty Tactics and Warriors Orochi series.

=== Miscellaneous ===
- Age of Empires II: Definitive Edition - The Three Kingdoms is a DLC for Age of Empires II: Definitive Edition, released by Xbox Game Studios on 6 May 2025, featuring the Three Kingdoms as playable civilizations and three campaigns based on the novel.
- Atlantica Online: Three Kingdoms is an expansion in Tactical Battle System in this MMORPG published by Nexon Corporation.
- Battle of Red Cliffs VR is a virtual reality PC game released by Wisecat on 2 November 2017.
- Destiny of an Emperor is a RPG for the NES released in North America.
- Dragon Throne: Battle of Red Cliffs is a real time strategy game for the PC released by Object Software Limited in March 2002.
- Dynasty Tactics is a strategy game for the PlayStation 2 released by Koei on 17 September 2002.
- Dynasty Tactics 2 is a strategy game for the PlayStation 2 released by Nex Entertainment on 23 September 2003.
- Dynasty Wars and its sequel Warriors of Fate, released by Capcom. They are based on Motomiya Hiroshi's manga Tenchi o Kurau. Three instalments of a similar game were released by International Games System. These are best described as side-scrolling "beat-'em-up" games, similar to the Double Dragon video games.
- Fantasia Sango is a 2D RPG series released by UserJoy Technology. It uses the events in the novel as the backdrop for the plot. The re-telling of the story also involves traditional Chinese supernatural entities and concepts. Besides Fantasia Sango, UserJoy Technology has also developed the MMORPG The Legend of Three Kingdoms Online.
- Heroes of Three Kingdoms is a MMORPG by Perfect World Entertainment.
- Kessen II is a battle-focused real-time strategy game released by Koei in 2001. Unlike the other Koei games, this game has a highly fantasised version of the novel as a plot and also introduces magic to the series as a usable skill. Both the parent and predecessor versions of the game are set in Japan and not China.
- Kingdom Story: Brave Legion is a game for the IOS and Android developed by Picneko Creative and released in 2016.
- Knights of Valour is a side-scrolling "beat-'em-up" action video game released by International Games System.
- Koihime Musō is a visual novel by BaseSon portrays many heroes from the novel as female warriors and lords. Shin Koihime Musō is a new version of Koihime Musō with many new characters released in 2008. Both games were adapted into anime. Its later sequels– Shin Koihime†Musō: Moe Shōden, Shin Koihime†Eiyūtan: Otome Enran Sangokushi Engi, Shin Koihime†Musō -Kakumei– expand the characters range and tell more about the protagonist's story to conquer the maidens' hearts. Web Koihime†Musō was an online browser-based spinoff of the series, while Shin Koihime†Musō: Otome Taisen Sangokushi Engi and its sequel Koihime†Embu were fighting games.
- The Sango Fighter series portrayed the generals as characters in a two-dimensional fighting game.
- Three Kingdoms: Fate of the Dragon is a real time strategy game released for the PC by Eidos Interactive in 2001. It portrays all of the events in the original story.
- Three Kingdoms: Legends of Heroes is a strategy game released for the PC by Hangzhou Electronic Soul Technology on 27 August 2018.
- Three Kingdoms: The Last Warlord is a turn based strategy game released for the PC by LongYou Game Studio on 27 May 2017.
- Three Kingdoms Online, real time browser strategy game released by Koramgame in 2009.
- Total War: Three Kingdoms is a real-time strategy game in the Total War series based on the setting.
- Wo Long: Fallen Dynasty is an action role-playing game developed by Team Ninja and released on 3 March 2023.
- Yokoyama Mitsuteru Sangokushi II is a strategy game released for the SNES by Tose on 29 December 1993.
- Yokoyama Mitsuteru Sangokushi Bangi: Sugoroku Eiyuuki is a board game released for the SNES by Tose on 22 December 1994.
- Shōjo Kageki Revue Starlight -Re LIVE-, released on 22 October 2018, presents one story event of three stage girls from Seiran General Arts Institute where they have to perform based on the Three Kingdoms era.
- Sangokushi Taisen (Japanese: 三国志大戦) is hybrid physical and digital collectible card game for the arcade. It is a real-time strategy-based game set in the Three Kingdoms period of Chinese history and the 14th century Chinese novel Romance of the Three Kingdoms by Luo Guanzhong.
- Reigns: Three Kingdoms.

== Others ==
Card games

- Generals Order is a strategy card game released by Strategy Entertainment. The game is also a collectible trading card game.
- Portal Three Kingdoms is an expansion set for the trading card game Magic: The Gathering.
- Sangokushi Taisen is a hybrid card-board-strategy game released by Sega. Players manipulate cards on a tabletop to move military units in order to take destroy enemy castles.
- Guangzhou Radio had a popular one-man retelling of the stories in the 1980s.
- Romance of the Three Kingdoms Podcast is a podcast retelling the novel in English, with supplemental background information for context.
- In the late 2019 and early 2020 expansions Ignition Assault and Eternity Code, the Yu-Gi-Oh! Trading Card Game released a group of cards named "Ancient Warriors" based on characters and events from the novel. In Japan, these cards have the name "Senka" (lit. Warring Flower).
- Daisenran!! Sangokushi Battle is Japanese collectible card game.

Board games

- Three Kingdoms Redux is a 2014 board game for 3 players by publisher Starting player where each player represents one of the three warring kingdoms.
