= Noriyoshi Ohrai =

Japanese illustrator

- 生頼 範義
- Self-portrait of Noriyoshi Ohrai
- Born: November 17, 1935; Hyogo, Japan
- Died: October 27, 2015 (aged 79); Miyazaki, Japan
- Occupation: Illustrator
- Years active: 1960–2015
- Era: Shōwa era; Heisei era
- Children: Taro Ohrai
- Awards: Seiun Award

Noriyoshi Ohrai (Japanese: 生頼 範義, Hepburn: Ōrai Noriyoshi; November 17, 1935 – October 27, 2015) was a Japanese illustrator. He is most notable for illustrating the international poster for The Empire Strikes Back (1980) and several Godzilla film posters during the Heisei era.

Ohrai's prolific work includes the illustration of over 1,300 book and magazine covers, video game box art, movie posters and portraits.

== Career ==
Ohrai started his career as an illustrator after dropping out of a painting course at Tokyo University of the Arts in 1957. He first began to exhibit his paintings in Ginza in 1960 however he was unable to sell a single piece of artwork. In 1962, Ohrai joined a startup advertising company called the Tokyu Agency.

Over the course of his career, Ohrai illustrated over 1,300 book covers alone, and was known for completing artwork commissions within 3 days. He was wide-reaching in his work, creating photorealistic military illustrations for historical magazines, sci-fi paintings for movies and novels, and portraits of historical figures such as U.S. Presidents and Japanese warriors.

In 1980, Ohrai created multiple illustrations based on Star Wars for Tokuma Shoten's Definitive Edition Book on Space Sci-Fi Movies. This caught the eye of the film's creator George Lucas. At Lucas' request, Ohrai illustrated the international poster for The Empire Strikes Back, which was primarily featured for advertising the film in Japan and Australia. The poster was recognized globally and caused Ohrai to earn the Seiun Award at the Japanese Sci-Fi Convention in 1980. As a result, Ohrai was asked to commemorate the Japanese dub of Star Wars in 1982 by designing a poster for its theatrical debut.

Ohrai's international poster for The Empire Strikes Back

After his retirement in 2011, highlights of Ohrai's work were published in three collection books across 2014 and 2015, and exhibitions were displayed in his hometown of Miyazaki. In 2013, Ohrai was awarded the Miyazaki Prefecture Culture Prize for his contribution to art in Japan.

== Personal life ==
Noriyoshi Ohrai was born in Akashi, Japan on November 17, 1935. At age 19, he studied painting at Tokyo University of the Arts before dropping out in 1957. In 1973, he moved to Miyazaki.

Ohrai had a private lifestyle and only shared himself through self-portraits, with no public photographs of him in circulation. In 2011, Ohrai had a stroke which prevented him from illustrating and forced him into retirement.

On October 27, 2015, Ohrai died at the age of 79 from pneumonia. His son, Taro Ohrai, is an artist in Japan.

== Selected works ==
=== Illustrations for films ===
Year	Title	Role	Ref
1980	The Empire Strikes Back	International poster	
1982	Star Wars	Japanese dub theatrical release poster	
1982	Future War 198X	Illustrations	
1982	The Beastmaster	International poster	
1984	Godzilla	Poster	
1985	The Goonies	International poster	
1989	Godzilla vs. Biollante	Poster	
1991	Godzilla vs. King Ghidorah	Poster	
1992	Godzilla vs. Mothra	Poster	
1993	Godzilla vs. Mechagodzilla II	Poster	
1994	Godzilla vs. SpaceGodzilla	Poster	
1995	Godzilla vs. Destoroyah	Poster	
2000	Godzilla vs. Megaguirus	Poster	
2004	Godzilla: Final Wars	Poster	
2006	Sinking of Japan	Poster	

=== Illustrations for novels ===
Title	Author	Role	Ref
Wolf Guy series	Kazumasa Hirai	Cover art, illustrations	
Zombie Hunter series	Kazumasa Hirai	Cover art, illustrations	
Genma Taisen series	Kazumasa Hirai	Cover art, illustrations	
Vampire Wars series	Kiyoshi Kasai	Cover art	
Taiko: An Epic Novel of War and Glory in Feudal Japan	Eiji Yoshikawa	English publication cover art	
Musashi: An Epic Novel of the Samurai Era	Eiji Yoshikawa	English publication cover art	
Lensman series	E. E. Smith	Cover art	

=== Illustrations for games ===
Year	Title	Publisher	Role	Ref
1987	Genghis Khan	Koei	Box art	
1988	Ishin no Arashi	Koei	Box art	
1989	Romance of the Three Kingdoms II	Koei	Box art	
1989	P.T.O.	Koei	Box art	
1989	Bandit Kings of Ancient China	Koei	Box art	
1990	Uncharted Waters	Koei	Box art	
1990	L'Empereur	Koei	Box art	
1991	Gemfire	Koei	Box art	
1992	Genghis Khan II: Clan of the Gray Wolf	Koei	Box art	
1992	Romance of the Three Kingdoms III: Dragon of Destiny	Koei	Box art	
1992	Taikou Risshiden V	Koei	Box art	
1993	P.T.O. II	Koei	Box art	
1993	Uncharted Waters II	Koei	Box art	
1993	Rise of the Phoenix	Koei	Box art	
1993	Liberty or Death	Koei	Box art	
1994	Genpei Kassen	Koei	Box art	
1994	Progenitor	Koei	Box art	
1994	Romance of the Three Kingdoms IV: Wall of Fire	Koei	Box art	
2001	Metal Gear Solid 2: Sons of Liberty	Konami	Premium package booklet	
2002	Monster Traveler	Taito	Box art	
2004	Metal Gear Solid: The Twin Snakes	Konami	Premium package booklet	
2004	Metal Gear Solid 3: Snake Eater	Konami	Premium package booklet, poster	
2006	Metal Gear Solid: Portable Ops	Konami	Premium package interior box art	

=== Art collection books ===
- Illustrations by Noriyoshi Ohrai (1980, Tokuma Shoten) ISBN 4-19-402116-9
- Future War 198X Illustrations Collection by Noriyoshi Ohrai (1982, Kodansha) ISBN 4-06-108067-9
- Illustrations 2: The World of Demons by Noriyoshi Ohrai (1983, Tokuma Shoten) ISBN 4-19-402685-3
- The Beauties in Myths by Noriyoshi Ohrai (1988, Tokuma Shoten) ISBN 4-19-413716-7
- Noriyoshi Ohrai: The Illustrator (2014, Miyazaki Bunka Honpo) ISBN 978-4-9907484-0-1
- The Green Universe by Noriyoshi Ohrai (2014, Gentosha) ISBN 978-4-7683-0583-6
- Noriyoshi Ohrai II: Corridor of Memories 1966-1984 (2015, Miyazaki Bunka Honpo) ISBN 978-4-9907484-3-2
