= Genghis Khan: Aoki Ookami to Shiroki Mejika IV =

1998 video game

- Box art of the PlayStation version
- Developer: Koei
- Publisher: Koei
- Series: Genghis Khan
- Platforms: Microsoft Windows, PlayStation
- Release: Windows: JP: 1998; JP: 1999; (With Power Up Kit): TW: 1999; TW: 2000; (With Power Up Kit); PlayStation: JP: 1999
- Genre: Strategy
- Mode: Single-player or up to eight-player game

Genghis Khan: Aoki Ookami to Shiroki Mejika IV (チンギスハーン・蒼き狼と白き牝鹿IV) is a 1998 video game developed by Koei. It is part of Koei's Historical Simulation Series of games, and is the sequel to Genghis Khan II: Clan of the Gray Wolf (the third game in the series). Unlike the previous games, IV was developed for fewer platforms: Microsoft Windows and PlayStation.

== Gameplay ==
The player is given the option to conquer either the country of Mongolia as Genghis Khan himself, or to play as a world leader and take over the known world of the time. The game is turn-based, and very similar to the Romance of the Three Kingdoms series in that everything is done with generals, and managing them is an important part of the game. Unlike Genghis Khan II, in this game the player has absolute control over everything; for example, previously, unless the king was in a given territory, he could not directly control it. The game also includes a turn-based battle sequence, allowing specific control to the player or delegated to a general. Unlike the previous games, players can use any countries.

== Scenario ==
Scenario 1 AD 1189 "The Gray Wolf Riding in Prairie".

Main characters (which countries controlled by player have default plots at the game start) - objective

Mongol with Genghis Khan - defeat Jadaran and Keraites
France with Philip II - defeat England
Kamakura Regime (will change to Kamakura Shogunate after conquest Hiraizumi Regime) with Minamoto no Yoritomo - defeat Hiraizumi Regime
Byzantine Empire with Isaac II - defeat Republic of Venice

Scenario 2 AD 1271 "The Descendants of Gray Wolf".

Main characters

Yuan dynasty with Kublai Khan - defeat Southern Song dynasty
Southern Song dynasty with Duzong - defeat Yuan dynasty
Kamakura Shogunate with Hōjō Tokimune - capture one of any Eurasia cities
England with Henry III - defeat France

Scenario 3 AD 1229 "The Roaring of the Wolves" (added in PUK version)

Main characters

Mongol Empire with Ögedei Khan - defeat Jin dynasty
Jin dynasty with Aizong - defeat Mongol Empire
France with Louis IX - capture any cities
Holy Roman Empire with Frederick II - capture any Islamic cities
*** Any countries which have near and bad relationship with Mongol Empire will have a plot that Jalal al-Din Mangburni wants to join the player to revenge the Mongols.

Scenario 4 AD 1370 "The Wolf Appear in Western Regions" (added in PUK version)

Main characters

Timurid Empire with Timur - defeat Kipchak Khanate
Ming dynasty with Zhu Yuanzhang - defeat Yuan dynasty
Byzantine Empire with John V - defeat Ottoman Turks
France with Charles V - defeat England
***England will have a plot and get Garter Knights after the few turns, controlled by the player or computer.
