= Rise of the Phoenix (video game) =

1993 video game

- North American SNES cover art
- Developer: Koei
- Publisher: Koei
- Composers: SNES: Tomoki Hasegawa
- Platforms: SNES; NEC PC-9801; FM Towns; X68000; PlayStation
- Release: NEC PC-9801: JP: 1993; SNES: JP: April 6, 1994; NA: February 1995; PlayStation: JP: March 26, 1998
- Genre: Turn-based historic strategy
- Modes: Single-player, multiplayer

Rise of the Phoenix (項劉記, Kōryūki) is a multiplatform turn-based historic strategy video game made by Koei for the SNES, NEC PC-9801, and PlayStation console devices.

The game is set in ancient China during the Chu-Han Contention between Liu Bang and Xiang Yu in the 3rd century BC.

== Gameplay ==
General Liu Bang is preparing his strategy to resolve the siege over an ancient Chinese city.

The gameplay and control are quite unlike the similarly themed Romance of the Three Kingdoms or Nobunaga's Ambition series. The commands are set in four weeks during one month. The player must first choose the "planning" stage, where they can decide to improve their cities or make allies. The next week is called the "Action" stage, where the player chooses where to move their armies.

The player plays as either Liu Bang or Xiang Yu. Liu Bang has below average stats for Politics and Skills. However, his Charisma is high, and hence it is easy for him to make allies. Xiang Yu has high personal stats, while his Charisma is lower. Although the story is set during a five-year span, the player is not penalized if they do not finish the game in less than five years.

== Reception ==
Reception

Review score
Publication	Score
Electronic Gaming Monthly	6.8/10 (SNES)

Reviewing the SNES version, Electronic Gaming Monthly commented that though action fans would be repelled by the game's pacing, "For those who like this type of game, Rise of the Phoenix is an excellent strategic war simulation." They praised the numerous options, the music, and the cinematic sequences. GamePro contended that the game's simplified interface compared to other Koei games (specifically, the lack of emphasis on city management and cash flow, and the inability to control individual fighting units), while making the game slightly more accessible to casual gamers, would be highly unsatisfying to Koei's fan base.
