= Sangokushi V =

1996 video game

- Developer: Koei
- Publisher: Koei
- Designer: Koei
- Composer: Takayuki Hattori
- Series: Romance of the Three Kingdoms
- Platforms: MS-DOS, Sega Saturn, PlayStation, PSP
- Release: PC: JP: 26 September 2001; Saturn: JP: 27 September 1996; PlayStation: JP: 14 February 1997; PlayStation Portable: JP: 9 November 2006
- Genre: Turn-based strategy
- Modes: Single-player, multiplayer

Sangokushi V (三國志V) is the 5th installment in Koei's Romance of the Three Kingdoms series. The game was released for MS-DOS, Sega Saturn, PlayStation, PlayStation Portable.

Koei planned to release the PlayStation version in North America in the third quarter of 1998, but this release was cancelled. With no English version of the game on the table, the USA division of Koei sold the Traditional Chinese version of the DOS game in the United States by mail order, without technical or game play support. No further English versions of Romance of the Three Kingdoms games (including spinoffs) were released for PC platforms until Romance of the Three Kingdoms XI in 2008.

On Windows, Playstation and Sega Saturn releases of the game, scenes from the 1994 Romance of the Three Kingdoms TV series are used for cutscenes.

== Power up kit ==
Power up kit includes following features:

- 4 new scenarios.
