= Romance of the Three Kingdoms XIV =

- Developer: Kou Shibusawa
- Publisher: Koei Tecmo
- Director: Toshiyuki Kobayashi
- Designer: Toshiya Ueno
- Composers: Masako Otsuka; Hideki Sakamoto
- Series: Romance of the Three Kingdoms series
- Platforms: PlayStation 4 PlayStation 5 Microsoft Windows; Nintendo Switch
- Release: PlayStation 4, Microsoft Windows: JP: January 16, 2020; TW: January 16, 2020; NA: February 28, 2020; EU: February 28, 2020; Nintendo Switch: JP: December 9, 2020; WW: February 11, 2021
- Genre: Strategy
- Mode: Single-player

Romance of the Three Kingdoms XIV, also known as Sangokushi 14 (三國志14), is the 14th installment in the Romance of the Three Kingdoms (Sangokushi) strategy game series by Koei. It was released on January 16, 2020, for the PlayStation 4 and Microsoft Windows in Japan and Taiwan. It was also released for the Nintendo Switch in Japan on December 9, 2020, an international release followed suit.

== Gameplay ==
The gameplay of Romance of the Three Kingdoms XIV is to choose any characters by triumphing over the land and start taking charge of the fate of China.

== Reception ==
Famitsu gave the game a combined score of 34 out of 40. PC Gamer and PCGamesN had more mixed reviews, with the English localization and slow pace of the battles in particular being criticized.

Within a few days of its release, over 20,000 copies of the PS4 version of the game were sold in Japan. The game had shipped over 500,000 copies by 2021.
