= Romance of the Three Kingdoms IX =

2003 video game

- North American game cover
- Developer(s): Koei
- Publisher(s): Koei
- Designer(s): Hisatsugu Ishikawa; Masahiko Sugahara; Daichi Akiyama; Sotaro Kuroda; Norimitsu Komine
- Series: Romance of the Three Kingdoms
- Platform(s): Microsoft Windows; PlayStation 2
- Release: Windows: JP: 14 May 2003; JP: 19 August 2003 (With Power Up Kit); PlayStation 2: JP: 10 December 2003; NA: 24 February 2004; JP: 2 September 2004 (With PUK)
- Genre(s): Role-playing, turn-based strategy
- Mode(s): Single-player, Multiplayer

Romance of the Three Kingdoms IX, also known as Sangokushi IX (三國志IX) in Japan, is the ninth installment in the Romance of the Three Kingdoms (Sangokushi) strategy game series by Koei. The game chronicles the events of 2nd and 3rd century China based on the writings of the historical novel Romance of the Three Kingdoms. Players are able to play through various historical, challenge, or "if" scenarios with the automatic rank of ruler.

== Gameplay ==
The game is set in the Three Kingdoms period in China and is based on the novel Romance of the Three Kingdoms. Unlike its two immediate predecessors, Sangokushi IX always casts the player as a ruler. The player's goal is to bring every city on the map under his or her command; this is achieved by hiring other historical figures from the book, referred to as officers, and using them to cultivate cities, recruit armies, and fight or plot against enemy forces.

- The game comprises 15 historical scenarios, 5 challenge scenarios, and 5 "if" scenarios; each with the possibility of having multiple story endings based on the gameplay.
- With the Officer Development System points can be spent to increase officer abilities and skills as well as the option of gifting special items to raise officer stats.
- Game map outlines all the important capitals, ports, forts, troop movements, geography, and enemy strongholds.
- Personality Dependent System affects an officer's adherence to your commands or their decision making skills in battle.
- There are 30 different march formations to choose from when deploying troops or combat units.
- Through the Command Menu players can employ various war, political, or economic strategies.
- Players may use save data from Dynasty Warriors 4, Dynasty Warriors 4 Xtreme Legends, or Dynasty Tactics 2 to obtain new officers for the PlayStation 2 version.
- Up to 8 players can play on turn-based plays.

== Power up kit ==
Power up kit adds the following:

- Trial story mode. In this stage attack game, story events change depending on how you play the game. It is available for each of the 3 kingdoms.
- Soldier scouting. A general can search for worthy soldiers to become generals during battles.
- Alliance system. When player's kingdom become more powerful, smaller kingdoms will ally against player.
- Improved AI.
- Expert mode. In this mode, general can be killed in battle, enemy's attack power is raised.
- When moving troops, player can set waypoints different from the ones set by computer.
- City tactics. When scaling cities, different tactics can affect the results of a battle.
- Editor can alter city and general's data.
- Logging feature.

PlayStation 2 Power up kit adds following:

- Item editor.

== Reception ==
The game received an aggregate score of 74/100 on Metacritic, based on 17 critic reviews.
