= Crimson Sea =

2002 video game

- Developer: Koei
- Publisher: Koei
- Director: Fumito Kozutsumi
- Producer: Yoshiki Sugiyama
- Designer: Takamitsu Yamamoto
- Programmer: Hiroshi Kadowaki
- Writer: Akira Ishiguro
- Composer: Yoshihiro Ike
- Platform: Xbox
- Release: JP: December 12, 2002; NA: December 16, 2002; EU: March 28, 2003
- Genres: Third-person shooter, Hack and slash, Action adventure, RPG
- Mode: Single-player

Crimson Sea (紅の海, Kurenai no Umi) is a 2002 video game released exclusively for the Microsoft Xbox. The game was developed by Koei. The game is a Hack and slash/third-person shooter with some RPG elements incorporated and is part of the Crimson Sea series. The game was followed by a sequel, Crimson Sea 2 (紅の海２, Beni no Umi 2), which was released for the PlayStation 2 in 2004.

== Gameplay ==
The player takes control of Sho. The game features elements from role playing games and the action genre. When Sho isn't on a mission, he can wander around the IAG ship and talk to his comrades. He can chat with his coworkers, purchase training sessions, and buy new equipment at shops.

During battle sequences, Sho can fight with a short-ranged laser weapon, a gun, or a Neo-Psionic, an attack that has different effects. Weapons contain three different parts. Each part is customizable at any point in the game once you purchase them and will affect weapon stats along with special functions. Neo Psionics act as magic and can either be similar to a musou attack, implement additional buffs on Sho's stats, or temporarily add a field effect such as stopping time. Combos mainly utilize the blade and gun attacks, which can be customized to the player's liking. Other battle controls are similar to the Warriors games except Sho can also lock-on to targets and dash in short spurts to avoid attacks.

Completing missions with a high rank unlocks more items for Sho to buy. Earning an "S" Rank is the only way to unlock enhanced versions of some items and weapons.

== Story ==
The game is set in the fictional star system of Theophilus. It features many planets including the metropolis planet of Grarve, the mountain/desert-like planet of Agitato, the jungle/forest planet of Semplice, the difficult to classify planet Gen and the mysterious Crimson Planet. The population consists of mostly humans but there are a few non-humans as well, though when humans first colonized the system they effectively took over.

The story revolves around a young man named Sho, who works as a private detective. Initially, he is hired to merely retrieve an item that was lost beneath Grarve, but is promptly drafted into the organization known as IAG (Intelligence Agency of the Galaxy). Sho becomes tasked with leading the unit known as G-Squad and must help do what he can to stop a terrifying threat against humanity known as the Mutons, as well as meeting Archeomusiologists (scholars that have studied sound) and discovers that IAG may be using him only as a weapon.

== Reception ==
Crimson Sea

Aggregate score
Aggregator	Score
Metacritic	78/100

Review scores
Publication	Score
Electronic Gaming Monthly	7.17/10
Eurogamer	7/10
Famitsu	8/10, 9/10, 7/10, 9/10
Game Informer	7.75/10
GamePro	3.5/5
GameSpot	7.5/10
GameSpy	4/5
GameZone	8.8/10
IGN	8.1/10
Official Xbox Magazine (US)	8.5/10

Crimson Sea received "favorable" reviews according to the review aggregation website Metacritic. It was released for the Xbox in Japan on December 12, 2002.

== Sequel ==
Crimson Sea 2
- Developer: Koei
- Publisher: Koei
- Director: Noriaki Toshikawa
- Platform: PlayStation 2
- Release: NA: March 30, 2004; JP: April 15, 2004; EU: September 3, 2004
- Genre: Third-person shooter
- Mode: Single-player

Crimson Sea 2

Aggregate score
Aggregator	Score
Metacritic	75/100

Review scores
Publication	Score
Electronic Gaming Monthly	7.17/10
Eurogamer	6/10
Famitsu	32/40
Game Informer	7/10
GamePro	3/5
GameSpot	7.4/10
GameSpy	4/5
GameZone	8.9/10
IGN	8.4/10
Official U.S. PlayStation Magazine	3.5/5
Maxim	8/10
The Sydney Morning Herald	3.5/5

Crimson Sea was followed by its sequel, Crimson Sea 2, which was released exclusively for the PlayStation 2 in North America on March 30, 2004, in Japan on April 15, and in Europe on September 3. The sequel also received "favorable" reviews upon release, though slightly less than the original Crimson Sea, according to Metacritic. Famitsu also gave the sequel 32 out of 40.
