= Yawaraka Sangokushi Tsukisase!! Ryofuko-chan =

Japanese manga series

やわらか三国志 突き刺せ!! 呂布子ちゃん
- Genre: action, comedy, magic
- Original video animation
- Directed by: Yuji Moriyama
- Produced by: Gou Nakanishi; Nobuyuki Kurashige; Tomoko Kawasaki
- Written by: Hitomi Amamiya
- Music by: Kei Haneoka
- Studio: Chaos Project
- Released: December 26, 2007 – March 26, 2008
- Runtime: 25 minutes per episode
- Episodes: 4

Yawaraka Sangokushi Tsukisase!! Ryofuko-chan is a Japanese manga and anime, loosely based on Luo Guanzhong's 14th century novel Romance of the Three Kingdoms.

It began in the comedy manga I, Otaku: Struggle in Akihabara by Jiro Suzuki, which the characters watched in their world. It was turned by Square Enix into a real manga in Monthly GFantasy magazine. It was later turned into an anime by Starchild.

== Cast ==
- Yuki Matsuoka as Ryofuko
- Akemi Satō as Rena
- Chinami Nishimura as Chin Kyuu
- Fumihiko Tachiki as Kanu
- Hiroyuki Yoshino as Sou Sou
- Jouji Nakata as Kakou Ton
- Junko Noda as Asumi
- Kanako Tateno as Nami
- Keiichi Sonobe as Sekitome
- Norio Wakamoto as Kou Jun
- Yuri Shiratori as Eri Matsuoka
- Kiyoyuki Yanada as Fisherman A
- Mitsuaki Madono as Fisherman B

== Episode list ==
No.	Title
1	"Incident No. 1; Incident No. 2" "hapuningu 1; hapuningu 2" (はぷにんぐ 1; はぷにんぐ 2)
2	"Incident No. 3; Incident No. 4" "hapuningu 3; hapuningu 4" (はぷにんぐ 3; はぷにんぐ 4)
3	"Incident No. 5; Incident No. 5 (part 2); Incident No. 6" "hapuningu 5; hapuningu 5no2; hapuningu 6" (はぷにんぐ 5; はぷにんぐ 5の2; はぷにんぐ 6)
4	"Incident No. 7; Incident No. 8" "hapuningu 7; hapuningu 8" (はぷにんぐ 7; はぷにんぐ 8)
At the end of the episode there is a mock-up trailer for the "Next episode: Meeting in the Galaxy Center: How are you and Welcome to the galaxy's hot spring.", announcing a two episodes release.
