= Romance of the Three Kingdoms XIII =

2016 video game

- Japanese PlayStation 4 cover art
- Developer: Kou Shibusawa
- Publisher: Koei Tecmo
- Series: Romance of the Three Kingdoms
- Platforms: PlayStation 3 PlayStation 4 PlayStation Vita; Xbox One; Microsoft Windows; Nintendo Switch
- Release: PlayStation 3: JP: January 28, 2016; PlayStation 4, Microsoft Windows: JP: January 28, 2016; NA: July 5, 2016; EU: July 8, 2016; Nintendo Switch: JP: March 30, 2017; Xbox One: WW: April 25, 2017; PlayStation Vita: JP: May 25, 2017
- Genre: Strategy
- Mode: Single-player

Romance of the Three Kingdoms XIII, also known as Sangokushi 13 (三國志13), is the 13th installment in the Romance of the Three Kingdoms (Sangokushi) strategy game series by Koei. It was released on January 28, 2016, for the PlayStation 4, PlayStation 3, Xbox One, and Microsoft Windows in Japan. While it can be imported or purchased on PC worldwide it was not initially available in English like the previous installment. However, as part of the 30th Anniversary of the series, a localized version of the game was released on PlayStation 4 and PC in July 2016. Two modes featured in the game are the traditional campaign mode and a hero mode that teaches players about the game's mechanics. The upgraded version, titled Romance of the Three Kingdoms XIII with Power-Up Kit, will get a digital only in Japan on February 16, 2017, on Xbox One. The English version was released on Xbox One in April 2017.

== Reception ==
The game received an aggregated review score of 36 out of 40 from Famitsu magazine.

It sold 7,719 copies within its first week of release in Japan.
