= G1 Jockey 4 =

2005 video game

- Developer(s): Koei
- Publisher(s): Koei: AU: THQ
- Series: G1 Jockey
- Platform(s): PlayStation 2, Wii
- Release: PlayStation 2: JP: December 22, 2005; AU: March 30, 2006; EU: March 31, 2006; Wii: JP: March 15, 2007; AU: June 28, 2007; EU: June 29, 2007
- Genre(s): Horse racing
- Mode(s): Single-player, multiplayer

G1 Jockey 4 (ジーワンジョッキー4, Jī Wan Jokkī 3) is a thoroughbred horse racing simulation video game produced by Koei for the PlayStation 2 in 2005–2006.

A Wii version of the game called G1 Jockey Wii (ジーワンジョッキーWii, Jī Wan Jokkī Wii) was released in 2007.

== Reception ==
Reception

Aggregate score
Aggregator	Score	
Aggregator	PS2	Wii
Metacritic	65/100	67/100

Review scores
Publication	Score	
Publication	PS2	Wii
Eurogamer	(average)	7/10
Famitsu	31/40	31/40
Gamekult	4/10	N/A
GamesMaster	N/A	65%
Jeuxvideo.com	12/20	13/20
NGamer	N/A	78%
Official Nintendo Magazine	N/A	63%
PlayStation Official Magazine – UK	7/10	N/A
PALGN	6/10	7/10
VideoGamer.com	6/10	N/A

The game received "mixed or average reviews" on both platforms according to the review aggregation website Metacritic. In Japan, Famitsu gave both console versions each a score of three eights and one seven for a total of 31 out of 40.
