= Pop Cutie! Street Fashion Simulation =

2008 video game

- North American box art
- Developer: Koei
- Publisher: Koei
- Platform: Nintendo DS
- Release: JP: April 24, 2008; NA: October 6, 2008
- Genre: Simulation
- Modes: Single-player, multiplayer

Pop Cutie! Street Fashion Simulation, known in Japan as That's QT (ザッツキューティー, Zattsu Kyūtī), is a fashion design and business management simulation video game developed and published by Koei for the Nintendo DS handheld video game console.

== Gameplay ==
In Pop Cutie!, the player is put in charge of a fashion boutique, and is required to design, and sell clothes. Making clothes requires collecting keywords, which certain combination of words creates certain pieces of clothing. To sell your clothes, you must set up a store, and stock it with your items, as well as hire employees to take care of the store. You are set against rivals, who like you are selling clothes. In game you can also take part in "fashion battles", in which you are put against a rival to design an outfit based on a certain number of items. Your outfit is then judged on several criteria.

The game is broke into several stages, in which you must meet a certain objective to get to the next stage. In different stages your store is located in a different part of town, as well, the size of your store also changes, as well as your rivals.

== Reception ==
Reception

Aggregate score
Aggregator	Score
Metacritic	72/100

Review scores
Publication	Score
Game Informer	7.5/10
GameZone	7/10
IGN	7.5/10
Nintendo Power	6/10

The game received "mixed or average reviews" according to the review aggregation website Metacritic.
