= Romance of the Three Kingdoms 12 =

2012 video game

- Developer: Koei Tecmo
- Publisher: Koei Tecmo
- Composer: Masako Otsuka
- Series: Romance of the Three Kingdoms series
- Platforms: Microsoft Windows; PlayStation 3; PlayStation Vita; Wii U
- Release: Microsoft Windows: JP: 2012; TW: 2012; PlayStation 3, Wii U: JP: December 13, 2012
- Genre: Strategy
- Modes: Single-player, multiplayer

Romance of the Three Kingdoms 12, also known as Sangokushi 12 (三國志12), is the 12th installment in the Romance of the Three Kingdoms (Sangokushi) strategy game series by Koei. The game was released for the PC in 2012 in Japan and Taiwan and on December 13, 2012 for the Wii U and PlayStation 3 in Japan. The game was released in Japanese and Traditional Chinese. Additional scenarios can be unlocked throughout the game.

== Reception ==
Reception

Review score
Publication	Score
Famitsu	30/40

Sangokushi 12 has had a mixed to poor review ever since it was launched in 2012. Complaints include the lack of naval warfare, lack of unit types, and the overall gameplay. Though overall cities have been replaced by detailed maps with buildings you can place, the elaborate 3D duels throughout Sangokushi 11 have been downgraded to a video.
