= Romance of the Three Kingdoms (video game) =

1985 video game

- Developer: Koei
- Publisher: Koei
- Composer: Yoko Kanno
- Platforms: PC-88, PC-98, MSX, Nintendo Entertainment System, Amiga, MS-DOS, FM-7, Sharp X1, X68000, WonderSwan, Windows
- Release: 1985
- Genre: Turn-based strategy
- Modes: Single-player, multiplayer

Romance of the Three Kingdoms, known as Sangokushi in Japan, is a turn-based strategy video game published in 1985 by Koei. It is the first game in the Romance of the Three Kingdoms series. Originally released on the PC-88, it was ported to numerous platforms, including the PC-98, MSX, Nintendo Entertainment System (1988), Amiga, MS-DOS, FM-7, Sharp X1, X68000, WonderSwan, and Windows (2003).

== Gameplay ==
Romance of the Three Kingdoms is a game in which the player governs the provinces of China.

== Reception ==
Reception

Review score
Publication	Score
Famitsu	8/10, 9/10, 8/10, 8/10 (Famicom)

In Computer Gaming World, the game was reviewed by Dungeons & Dragons creator Dave Arneson, who wrote that it is "a great historical simulation and will keep players at their keyboards for many a night in order to win their empires. It has economics, intrigue, bribery, covert action, diplomacy, war, and more! There are many ways beyond simple conquest to accomplish one's goals." He concluded: "I most heartily recommend Romance to all serious game players out there."

In December 1989, Computer Gaming World readers gave it an average rating of 8.96 out of 10, making it the magazine's 13th highest user-rated game at the time. In 1990 and 1993 surveys of historical strategy and war games, the magazine gave Romance of the Three Kingdoms three-plus stars out of five.
