= Romance of the Three Kingdoms X =

2004 video game

- North American PlayStation 2 cover art
- Developer(s): Koei
- Publisher(s): Koei
- Director(s): Shinji Imura
- Designer(s): Akihiro Nakamura; Tatsuya Ishikawa; Shingo Takagi; Yukinori Ito; Toshiyuki Kobayashi
- Composer(s): Yoshihiro Ike
- Series: Romance of the Three Kingdoms
- Platform(s): Microsoft Windows, PlayStation 2
- Release: Microsoft Windows: JP: 2 July 2004; JP: 21 January 2005; PlayStation 2: JP: 10 March 2005; NA: 21 June 2005
- Genre(s): Turn-based strategy
- Mode(s): Single-player

Romance of the Three Kingdoms X, also known as Sangokushi X (三國志X) in Japan, is the 10th installment in the Romance of the Three Kingdoms (Sangokushi) strategy game series by Koei. It was originally released in the summer of 2004 and the PUK expansion was released several months afterwards. Sangokushi X abandoned many of Sangokushi IX's concepts and favors elements from Sangokushi VII and Sangokushi VIII, as well as Taikou Risshiden, which are in RPG format.

There was also a special edition titled Anniversary Box, which included walkthrough, history book, soundtrack and desk calendar.

== Gameplay ==
The overall objective of the game is to re-unify China. The player takes on the role of a historical figure from the novel Romance of the Three Kingdoms, referred to as an officer, to achieve this goal. There is also a function to create original characters.

The flow of gameplay is more similar to Sangokushi VIII than to Sangokushi IX, with the player having several possible ranks besides a ruler, each of which alters the players' options considerably. Ranks are fluid during gameplay; while a player's choice of officer initially sets rank, it is common to be promoted, demoted, captured, or even to rebel and form a new force.

In the North American version, the game is only single player.

=== Stages ===
There are seven starting scenarios, with four more added in the Power up kit.

== Power up kit ==
Power up kit adds following:

- Battle history mode. In this stage attack game, story event changes depending on how to play the game.
- Trial mode. In point trial mode, the goal is to earn as many points as possible in a battle. In victory trial, the goal is to use the assigned army to win as many stages as possible.
- Ability to marry other generals in-game and raise offspring.
- 8 new NPCs available for marriage (most of them are characters from The Seven Heroes and Five Gallants).
- 4 new scenarios in January 211, June 221, February 253, January 250. In the January 250 scenario, nearly every character present during Three Kingdoms period appeared. In addition, there are new events.
- City, item, general editors.
- Expert (超級) mode. In addition to extra difficulties, the game mechanics can be further customized.
- Logging feature. In addition to recording events, the logs are integrated with the world map to visually represent player's progresses.
- The ability to upload your own portraits from your PC into the game, which can then be used by your original characters.

Scenario editor 1.00 adds the following:

- 'Alliance gathering' setting when editing alliance relations.
- Assign start-up city for future generals.
- Upgraded general, city, item editors.

The Power up kit features are incorporated into the re-released PlayStation 2 game (never brought outside Japan or Taiwan), except only 3 of the 4 extra scenarios are available.
