= Sangokushi Online =

2008 video game

- Developer(s): Koei
- Publisher(s): Koei
- Series: Romance of the Three Kingdoms
- Platform(s): Microsoft Windows
- Release: JP: 2008-02-29
- Genre(s): MMORPG
- Mode(s): Multiplayer

Sangokushi Online (三國志Online) is Koei's third online Romance of the Three Kingdoms game developed for Microsoft Windows platform. Koei announced the development of its latest MMORPG in mid-2006. Koei planned on releasing Sangokushi Online in Japan in the first quarter of 2007 followed by the rest of Asia. However Koei started the first pre-open testing on September 27, 2007. A second pre-open testing was begun on February 7, 2008. Additionally, these plans do not reference a possible North American or European release. This follows Koei's tradition of Asia-only MMO releases, such as Nobunaga's Ambition. The game ended as servers shut down on 19 July 2010.

== Story ==
Sangokushi Online is set in the warring and chaotic times of the end of the Eastern Han dynasty in ancient China. Power struggles among ambitious men were everywhere but particularly there were three men who have successfully rallied sufficient abled talents, enough to build the empire of their own. The player will join this triangular conquest of power by taking one of the three sides, in hope for the unification of China!

=== World setting ===
In Sangokushi Online, the world of the virtual Three Kingdoms of ancient China is divided into five main regions, namely Jingzhou, Sili, Yizhou, Yuzhou and Yangzhou. There are also five major village and cities, namely the Shuijing Village (a village that is named after a wise old recluse who is also known as Sima Hui), Chang'an, Chengdu, Xuchang and Jianye. The Shuijing Village, which is situated in Jingzhou is an activity hub for the beginning players between Level 1 and 10, while Chang'an, which is found in Sili is the ideal place for players of Level 11 to Level 20. Chengdu is the stronghold of Liu Bei and it is located in Yizhou. Xuchang (Cao Cao's stronghold) and Jianye (Sun Quan's stronghold) are located in Yuzhou and Yangzhou respectively. The five regions are also peppered with dungeons of mythological creatures and other minor villages. A sixth region, featuring the dry and barren desert of Liangzhou has also been added in the August 2008 update. While most places are accessible on foot, players can also move around by other modes of transportation, such as zoning by horse or boat.

== Gameplay ==
The player will control a character avatar within a persistent game world and engage in activities such as exploring the landscape of ancient China, fighting bandits and mythical creatures, running errands, quests or political assignment missions, learning combat and production skills, and interacting with both NPCs and fellow players. In return for engaging in such activities, the player will be rewarded for their effort with money and items. Unlike most MMORPGs, player will be rewarded skill experience for using their skills which allows them to advance their skills further. Currently, players can level up the characters from Level 1 to 50. Players also choose to join clans (known as guilds in most MMORPGs). Like other MMORPGs, short term groups such parties and raids can be formed to explore the different territories and instances. As players take side in one of the 3 forces, the Wu Force, the Shu Force and the Wei Force (which are led by the powerful warlords, Sun Quan, Liu Bei and Cao Cao respectively), they will be able to take part in large scale (PvP & PvE) wars, with as many as 500 players on each side. At the end of each war session, players will be rewarded with rankings according to their performance during the war.

== Development history ==
From	To	Event
2007-01-24	2007-02-06	1st Closed Beta testing
2007-06-29	2007-06-30	Massive War Testing
2007-07-27	2007-08-05	2nd Closed Beta testing
2007-09-27	2007-10-10	Pre-Open testing (Schedule to release on 2007-10-11)
2007-10-05	-	Official Announcement of delay of release
2008-02-07	2008-02-28	2nd Pre-Open testing
2008-02-14	-	Official Announcement to release on 2008-02-29
2008-02-29	-	Release at 3:00pm (JPT)
