= Dynasty Warriors 4 =

2003 video game

- North America PlayStation 2 cover art depicting Lu Bu's main weapon, a Chinese polearm called Sky Scorcher.
- Developer: Omega Force
- Publisher: Koei
- Director: Akihiro Suzuki
- Series: Dynasty Warriors
- Platforms: PlayStation 2, Xbox, Microsoft Windows
- Release: PlayStation 2: JP: February 27, 2003; NA: March 25, 2003; PAL: June 27, 2003; Xbox: JP: September 4, 2003; NA: September 5, 2003; PAL: November 14, 2003; Microsoft Windows: WW: April 1, 2005
- Genre: Hack and slash
- Modes: Single-player, Multiplayer

Dynasty Warriors 4 (Note: Japanese: 真・三國無双3, Hepburn: Shin Sangokumusō 3; lit. 'True Three Kingdoms Unrivaled 3') (Note: The Japanese numbering for the Dynasty Warriors series games differ from the English translations, which start counting the titles from the 1997 fighting game Dynasty Warriors. The original Japanese release of the series' second title added the Japanese prefix true/genuine (真, shin) and was named Shin Sangokumusō (真・三國無双). The English translation simply numbered it as Dynasty Warriors 2, and the main titles in the series afterward followed suit.) is a 2003 hack and slash video game developed by Omega Force and published by Koei for the PlayStation 2. It is the fourth installment in the Dynasty Warriors series. An Xbox port followed later in the year as well as an enhanced port to personal computers in 2005 named Dynasty Warriors 4 Hyper. (Note: 真・三國無双3ハイパー, Shin Sangokumusō 3 Haipā; lit. 'True Three Kingdoms Unrivaled 3 Hyper') Similar to other titles in the series, Dynasty Warriors 4 is based on the historical novel Romance of the Three Kingdoms written by Luo Guanzhong. Set in the Three Kingdoms era of ancient China, the game depicts characters that are based on real-life figures as well as fictionalized versions of historical battles.

The gameplay features hundreds of soldiers fighting on battlefields of varying sizes. The player controls a single officer and can engage multiple enemies at once, with the aim to defeat the enemy's general in order to win the battle. The main gameplay mode depicts the events of the historical novel with branching story paths that include alternate history scenarios for the available characters. Only nine characters are available at the start; playing through the story grants access to more characters. Additional modes include an edit mode to create unique characters, a versus mode for duels, and a challenge mode.

Dynasty Warriors 4 was commercially successful. The game shipped 1 million copies within 9 days of its initial release in Japan and eventually sold 2.2 million copies to become one of the best selling titles in Koei's series of Warrior games. Critically Dynasty Warriors 4 was well received; it has an average of 78 out of 100 on Metacritics reviews and 79% on Game Rankings. Reviews noted the similarity to previous games in the series and complimented the enjoyable gameplay. Critics were divided on whether the improvements from the previous title were sufficient, while the game's English voice acting was universally panned. Two expansions, Dynasty Warriors 4: Xtreme Legends (Note: 真・三國無双3 猛将伝, Shin Sangokumusō 3 Mōshōden; lit. 'True Three Kingdoms Unrivaled 3 Legend of the Fierce Generals') and Dynasty Warriors 4: Empires, (Note: 真・三國無双3 Empires, Shin Sangokumusō 3 Empires; lit. 'True Three Kingdoms Unrivaled 3 Empires') were released for the PlayStation 2 that provided additional gameplay options and features.

== Gameplay ==
Guan Yu in an alternate costume attacks a squad of enemy soldiers while mounted on a horse. Character statistics like health, musou, and arrow inventory are displayed at the bottom while the engaged enemy's information, morale meter, and a mini-map are displayed at the top.

Dynasty Warriors 4 features hack and slash action gameplay from a third person perspective similar to previous titles in the series. One to two players can control an officer on a battlefield featuring hundreds of soldiers engaged in combat with a set time limit. Like other games in the genre, player characters use their unique weapons to defeat multiple enemies at once. Dynasty Warriors 4 also provides an option to shoot arrows from a first-person perspective and to have bodyguard support during gameplay. Battles are won when the enemy general is defeated, either by the player or the player's army, or a special preset condition is met. Conversely, if time expires or the player's character or main general is defeated, the game ends in a loss. Characters are defeated when their health is depleted. Characters also have a special Musou gauge that when filled allows them to execute a special attack.

Nine characters are available at the start, with more accessible by completing campaigns or specific conditions in the story focused Musou Mode. Players can augment characters with items discovered during battles. Items include saddles that grant the character a mount to ride, orbs that add elemental damage to attacks, and special equipment that can raise combat statistics or provide special abilities. Characters, weapons, and bodyguards can gain experience from combat that increase their rank, which strengthens their combat statistics.

The morale system returns in Dynasty Warriors 4, and represents the balance of each side's overall morale during a battle. Morale levels are influenced by actions that benefit a side's army and tip the scale in their favor. New features include additional officers to control; an Edit Mode, which allows players to create up to four custom characters; and siege equipment that provides new obstacles and battlefield objectives. Siege equipment include bridge layers, battering rams, and catapults. Players are also able to switch characters during a campaign, which focuses on a faction's story rather than an individual's. Another addition are duels during battles. Enemy officers can challenge the player's character to a timed one-on-one duel. Winning the duel defeats the officer and raises morale, whereas running out of time results in a draw and the battle continues.

== Plot ==
=== Characters ===
Only three characters are initially available from each of the Three Kingdoms: Liu Bei and his two sworn brothers, Guan Yu and Zhang Fei, from the Shu Kingdom; Cao Cao, Xiahou Dun, and Xiahou Yuan from the Wei Kingdom; and Sun Jian, his daughter Sun Shang Xiang, and Huang Gai from the Wu Kingdom. Additional characters in each kingdom become available after progressing through the Musou Mode of their respective faction.

Shu Kingdom characters include the generals Zhao Yun, Ma Chao, Wei Yan, Huang Zhong, and Jiang Wei. Other Shu playable warriors are the strategists Zhuge Liang and Pang Tong as well as Zhuge Liang's wife, Yue Ying, who is a new character to the series' roster. The Wei Kingdom includes Zhen Ji, the wife of Cao Pi, one of Cao Cao's sons, as well as the generals Dian Wei, Xu Huang, Sima Yi, Zhang Liao, Xu Zhu, and Zhang He. The new Wei character is Cao Cao's cousin, Cao Ren. The Wu Kingdom includes two of Sun Jian's sons, Sun Ce and Sun Quan, as well as Sun Ce's wife, Da Qiao, and her younger sister, Xiao Qiao. Other Wu playable characters include the generals Zhou Yu, Lu Meng, Gan Ning, Taishi Ci, Lu Xun, and Zhou Tai, who joins the playable roster this game.

The roster also includes several figures who featured prominently in various parts of the story grouped as an "Other" faction. The corrupt warlord Dong Zhuo as well as his courtesan Diao Chan and his traitorous general Lu Bu are accessible after progressing further through the story. Yuan Shao, the allied forces general and Cao Cao's rival, becomes available after completing the Wei campaign. The Nanman leaders Meng Huo and Zhu Rong first appear during the Shu or Wu campaigns and become accessible after they are defeated in a duel. After completing several different campaigns, the rebellious Yellow Turban leader Zhang Jiao becomes playable. Many other characters important to key events in the story appear as non-player characters during battles throughout the game (e.g., Cao Pi, Guan Ping, and Ling Tong).

=== Story ===
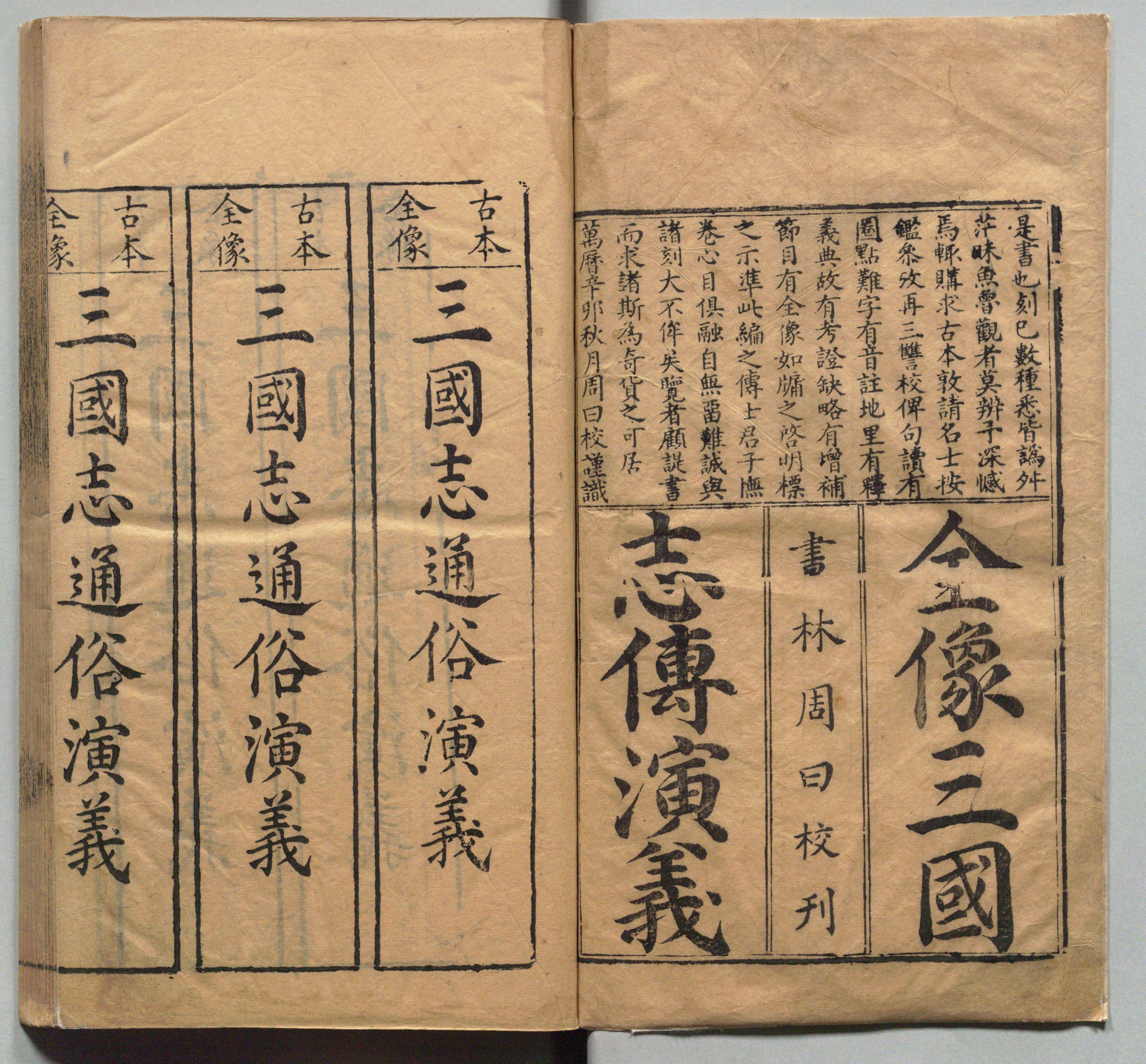
The game's story is based on the historical fiction Romance of the Three Kingdoms, written by Luo Guanzhong in the 14th century.

Based on the book Romance of the Three Kingdoms, Dynasty Warriors 4 is set in Ancient China during the Three Kingdoms era. The plot unfolds via the game's Musou Mode and features branching paths that change based on player choices. Special tales are included that are accessible by completing specific conditions during certain battles. Each faction's story includes events that are interwoven with the story of the others. Though the outcomes vary based on the player's actions, each path highlights the historical battles from the respective faction's perspective. Many of the paths begin at the Yellow Turban Rebellion, where the Han dynasty and Allied forces defeat Zhang Jiao and his religious sect, the Way of Peace. Soon after the rebellion, the warlord Dong Zhuo seizes control of the Imperial Court with the help of the fierce warrior Lu Bu and the courtesan Diao Chan. In response, the nobleman Yuan Shao rallies a group of allied forces against Dong Zhuo's forces. They successfully drove Dong Zhuo's armies back from Si Shui Gate and Hulao Gate, culminating in a battle at the capital Luoyang. Afterward, the forces split and three generals begin to form their own kingdoms: Shu Kingdom led by Liu Bei, Wei Kingdom led by Cao Cao, and Wu Kingdom led Sun Jian.

==== Three Kingdoms scenarios ====
During the Shu story, Liu Bei and his two sworn brothers, Guan Yu and Zhang Fei, fight to restore the Han Dynasty. After Dong Zhuo's defeat, Liu Bei searches for a place to settle his followers while clashing with the Wei Kingdom's leader, Cao Cao, who has become the ruler of northern China. As the game progresses, Liu Bei recruits others, like the warriors Zhao Yun and Ma Chao as well as the strategist Zhuge Liang, to strengthen his group. He eventually allies with the Wu Kingdom, led at the time by one of Sun Jian's son (Sun Quan), to fight Cao Cao, which leads to a joint effort at the Battle of Chi Bi. After the battle, Liu Bei attacks the Wu Kingdom, and during the campaign, defeats the Nanman from Southern China. The Shu Kingdom eventually defeats Wu at the Battle of Yi Ling. The Shu Kingdom's story concludes at the Battle of Wu Zhang Plains, where they overcome the remaining Wei forces, led by Sima Yi, Cao Cao's strategist. After defeating the major factions, Liu Bei unites China under the Shu Han Kingdom.

The Wei scenario features similar events from the perspective of their leader Cao Cao, who focuses on uniting China after Dong Zhuo's defeat. During a rebellion in Wan Castle, Cao Cao escapes with help of his guard Dian Wei. Cao Cao then formed an alliance with Liu Bei to defeat Lu Bu, gaining several officers in the process. Afterward, he destroys Yuan Shao's army at the Battle of Guan Du. Following his victories, Cao Cao begins a campaign against Liu Bei, pursuing him across several territories in China. As a result, Liu Bei joins forces with the Wu Kingdom against Cao Cao, culminating in the Battle of Chi Bi. However, the Wei forces thwart the joint alliance's strategies. Cao Cao continues advancing on the Shu and Wu forces until they are completely defeated, unifying China under the Wei Kingdom.

Similar to the other Kingdoms, the Wu story begins with the events of the Yellow Turban Rebellion and Dong Zhuo's coup. After Dong Zhuo's defeat, he escapes to Luoyang where Sun Jian attacks him and finds the Imperial Seal in the process. Upon returning home, Sun Jian finds out other generals have taken over Jing Province and the Wu Territory. With the help of his children, Sun Jian defeats the various generals, eventually regaining the Wu Territory while finding new generals to expand his army. Seeing Cao Cao's growing influence, the Wu Kingdom allies with the Shu Kingdom at the Battle of Chi Bi, successfully halting Cao Cao's momentum. Following the battle, the three Kingdoms begin to fight each other, and the Sun family lead campaigns against the Shu Kingdom to outwit their strategist, Zhuge Liang. After defeating the Nanman tribe, the Wu Kingdom conquers Shu at the Battle of Yi Ling. Turning their attention back to the Wei Kingdom, the Sun family defeats them at several locations, culminating at the Battle of Xu Chang and successfully unifying China.

==== Other scenarios ====
The game also includes stories that depict alternate histories for characters outside the main three Kingdoms. Yuan Shao's story has him successfully defeating his rival Cao Cao after quelling the Yellow Turban rebellion and Dong Zhuo's coup. After crushing the Wei forces at the Battle of Guan Du, Yuan Shao focuses on defeating Liu Bei and Sun Jian. He fights two campaigns against them, defeating Sun Jian at He Fei and Liu Bei in Xia Pi.

The Nanman scenario depicts them successfully repelling the Shu Kingdom after Dong Zhuo's coup. Infuriated at the Shu invasion, King Meng Huo resolves to defeat them at his wife's, Zhu Rong, encouragement. Meng Huo drives them into the Kingdom of Wu, which he decides to conquer, killing the Sun family in the process. He successfully continues his campaign into the Wei Kingdom and eventually marches on the Shu capital to defeat the last of its generals.

The story for Lu Bu details his victories at the Battles of Si Shui Gate and Hu Lao Gate where he fights off invaders for Dong Zhuo. Afterward, Lu Bu revolts in Wan Castle and executes Dong Zhuo to seize control of his army. He then wages war against Cao Cao, Liu Bei, and Sun Jian and defeats them to take over China.

Dong Zhuo's scenario also depicts his successes against the coalition led by Yuan Shao at Si Shui Gate and Hu Lao Gate. After his victory, Dong Zhuo follows Sun Jian, who took the Imperial Seal when he fled the capital. He then launches campaigns to destroy the rest of the alliance forces: Cao Cao and Liu Bei. After successfully eliminating the opposition, Dong Zhuo is betrayed by Lu Bu. He stops Lu Bu's rebellion and marches into the capital to complete his take over of China.

Zhang Jiao's story describes the Yellow Turbans' rise to power. Upon learning of the Han army's intention, Zhang Jiao leads the Yellow Turbans in a series of campaigns to defeat Liu Bei, Sun Jian, and Cao Cao. In its last effort, the Han send He Jin with a coalition of numerous generals to battle the Yellow Turbans. Zhang Jiao vanquishes the last of the Han and unifies China.

== Development ==
Dynasty Warriors 4 was developed by Koei's Omega Force team with Akihiro Suzuki directing. The team also included Tomohiko Sho. Suzuki noted that the large number of characters who appeared in different periods of the story made it difficult to create individual stories. They instead opted for stories focused on the era's factions. The developers took into account feedback from Dynasty Warriors 3, which included requests for individual stories for characters like Lu Bu and Diao Chan. Since development of Dynasty Warriors 4 had already begun, however, the team realized that adding in all the requested content would be very time-consuming. They instead decided to create Dynasty Warriors 3: Xtreme Legends and release it as a secondary disc to provide fans with the content they requested at a discounted price.

=== Audio ===
The game's theme song, "Cross Colors", was performed by Japanese pop singer Yuki Koyanagi. Koyanagi composed the song and wrote the lyrics with Kazuhiro Hara. The music was arranged by TATOO. Additionally, Koyanagi recorded an English version of the song for the game's end credits. Koei announced her involvement about a month before Dynasty Warriors 4's Japanese release. Warner Music Japan released the song on March 5, 2003, as part of the single "On the Radio".

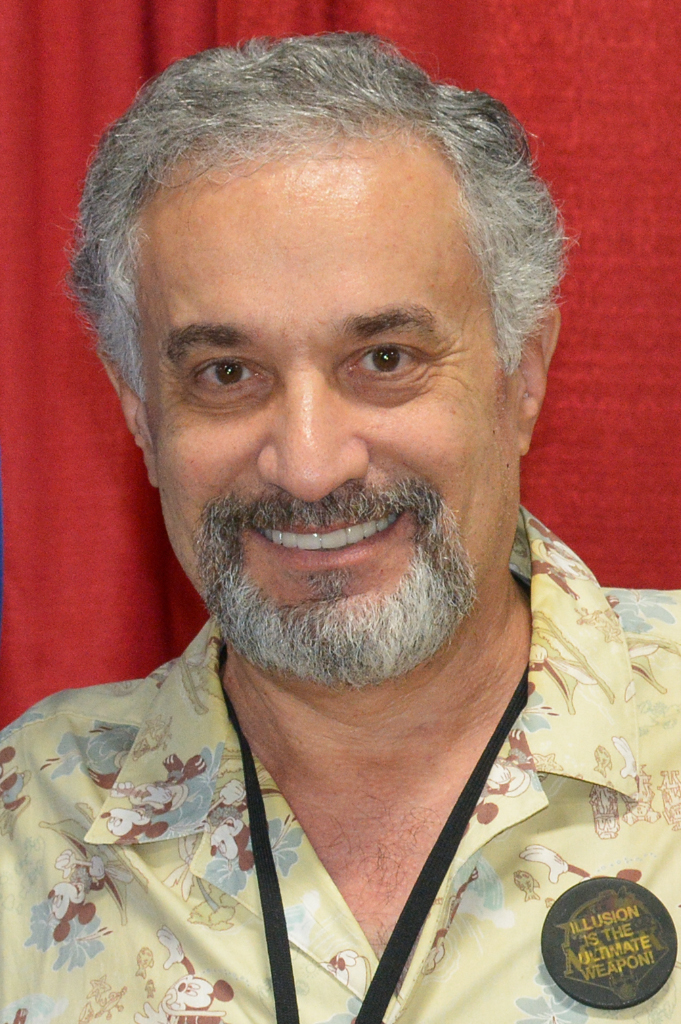
In addition to voice director duties, Doug Stone (shown in 2015) voiced three characters in the English release.

The game's voice cast consisted of 29 Japanese and 28 English voice actors for the respective versions of dialogue. The Japanese voice director was Seiji Miyazaki, whereas the English voice directors were Charles de Vries and Doug Stone. The leaders of the Three Kingdoms—Liu Bei, Cao Cao, and Sun Jian—were voiced by Moriya Endo, Yukimasa Kishino, and Yasuhiko Tokuyama, respectively. Their corresponding English dub counterparts are Daniel Woren, John Snyder, and Steve Blum. Much of the cast voiced two characters. For example, Masaya Onosaka voiced Zhao Yun and Zhuge Liang, Junko Shimakata voiced the Qiao sisters, and Takahiro Yoshimizu voiced Zhou Yu and Xu Zhu. Similarly for the English dialogue, Beau Billingslea voiced Cao Ren and Dian Wei, Wendee Lee voiced the two Qiaos, and Doug Stone voiced three characters: Gan Ning, Xu Zhu, and Zhang Jaio.

== Release and ports ==
Dynasty Warriors 4 was first announced in December 2002; Koei launched a teaser webpage that featured the game's Japanese logo. Soon after, the company announced that the game would be released in Japan in February 2003. Koei continued to update the Dynasty Warriors 4 webpage with information throughout December. Updates included that the game would be exclusive to the PlayStation 2, the siege-aspect of battles, reactionary artificial intelligence, new characters and stages, and the North American region's release window. After the North American release, Koei announced in April 2003 that Dynasty Warriors 4 would be released in Europe on June 27, 2003. Following Dynasty Warriors 4's commercial success, Sony Computer Entertainment America added it to their Greatest Hits lineup, reducing the list price down to $19.99. The game was included along with Dynasty Warriors 2, Dynasty Warriors 3 and their respective expansions in a Japanese exclusive five-disc compilation set titled 真・三國無双シリーズコレクション 上巻 (Shin Sangoku Musō Shirīzu Korekushon Jōkan, lit. 'True Three Kingdoms Unrivaled Series Collection First Volume'). The set, which was released in 2006, also included a data disc with game saves.

In June 2003, Koei's vice president of sales and marketing, Amos Ip, announced that they were porting the game to the Xbox console to broaden their audience. While the PlayStation 2 version features only monaural and stereo sound, the Xbox release includes support for 5.1 surround sound. Microsoft later announced in 2006 that Dynasty Warriors 4 was among the titles that would be backwards compatible with the Xbox 360 console, which allowed the game to be played in high-definition video.

Koei announced in 2005 that it would showcase Dynasty Warriors 4 PC at E3, which was later revealed to be Dynasty Warriors 4 Hyper. The game is a port of Dynasty Warriors 4 to computers running Windows 2000/Windows XP. Dynasty Warriors 4 Hyper features improved graphics, higher resolution options, more characters onscreen, improved draw distance, optional Japanese dialogue, and improved enemy AI. The additional content from Dynasty Warriors 4: Xtreme Legends was not included. Similar to the original game, Koei set up a website to promote the port and provide updates. In addition to hardware requirements, the website listed graphics cards that had been confirmed to work with the game as well as a program to check whether a user's system specifications meet the hardware requirements. The game was originally slated to be released on March 30, 2005. However, Koei delayed the release by two days due to "various circumstances". Later in October 2005, the company publicized that Dynasty Warriors 4 Hyper would be released in Europe on December 9 of that year.

== Reception ==
Reception

Aggregate scores
Aggregator	Score
GameRankings	PS2: 79% XBOX: 75% PC: 60%
Metacritic	PS2: 78/100; XBOX: 75/100; PC: 65/100

Review scores
Publication	Score
Game Informer	PS2: 7/10
GameSpot	PS2: 7.1/10
GameZone	Xbox: 8.7/10
IGN	PS2: 8.6/10
PlayStation 2 Magazine	PS2: 8/10
Famitsu Xbox	Xbox: 33/40 (Note: Famitsu Xbox magazine's four reviewers each provided an individual score (8, 7, 9, and 9) that are combined into a total score. Individual scores range from 0 to 10, with a total maximum of 40.)

Award
Publication	Award
CESA	Award for Excellence (2002-2003)

Dynasty Warriors 4 was commercially and overall critically successful. Previews for the game before its release expressed anticipation. Game Informer staff referred to the real-time siege equipment and one-on-one battles between officers as "tantalizing". GameSpot UK's Richardo Torres praised the graphical improvements from its predecessor as well as the new gameplay elements and called Dynasty Warriors 4 a "promising entry in the franchise." Randy Nelson of PlayStation 2 Magazine noted that the game would address fan's requests and that the updates would deepen the series' gameplay.

Soon after its Japanese release, Weekly Famitsu magazine reported that Dynasty Warriors 4 had sold 723,127 units in 4 days. Koei announced that it had shipped 1 million copies in 9 days. This was Koei's second title to reach this milestone; its first title, Dynasty Warriors 3, took a year to ship 1 million units. In the United Kingdom, the game debuted on the UK All Formats Game Chart at number 13 while it was still exclusively on the PlayStation 2. In reviewing the game, IGN's Jeremy Dunham anticipated that Dynasty Warriors 4 would "shatter sales records". The game eventually sold 2.2 million copies and was Koei's best selling title in the Warriors series until 2020's Hyrule Warriors: Age of Calamity. During its 2002-2003 award ceremony, the Computer Entertainment Supplier's Association in Japan bestowed Koei an Award for Excellence for the console releases of the game.

Critics noted that Dynasty Warriors 4 had not changed much from its predecessor but is still an entertaining game. Eduardo Zacarias of GameZone described it as "a very welcome familiar face even for long-time fans of the series" and noted that many series do not succeed without making "radical changes" to sequels. Game Informer reviewer Justin Leeper expressed amazement at the lack of innovation and improvement in Dynasty Warriors 4. Regardless, he praised the game's replay value and called some of the new gameplay additions and improvements "cool". Conversely, Dunham commented that Koei made many changes to the sequel that addressed graphical and character balancing issues from Dynasty Warriors 3. He praised the visuals, the enhanced enemy AI, the combat's combo system, and the diversity in the stages. Dunham, however, expressed disappointment in the siege engine, commenting that it "doesn't quite live up to its potential." Brad Shoemaker of GameSpot noted that Koei walked a "fine line between updating a venerable franchise with valuable new features and simply milking a cash cow." He further stated that new and fervent fans will enjoy Dynasty Warriors 4, but casual players are unlikely to purchase a sequel that is so similar to past titles they've already played. PlayStation 2 Magazine's Eric Bratcher praised the additions and improvements, calling it the "best Dynasty Warriors game yet." However, he criticized some issues that had persisted from the previous games such as poor camera angles, short draw distances and a lack of variety in the game objectives. In her column on gaming website Dengeki Online, Japanese actress Ayana praised the variety in the game's Edit Mode. While reflecting on the series, she commented that Dynasty Warriors 4 had the best costumes, noting that although the costumes changed only slightly between titles she enjoyed following the changes.

The gameplay was frequently lauded. Leeper described the game as easy to control and the combat as a "tension reliever". Shoemaker described the "superhuman" capabilities of the characters as "amusing" and the new changes as positive although minor. A year after its release, Ivan Sulic of IGN UK ranked Dynasty Warriors 4 the 5th best co-operative game on the PlayStation 2. He cited the game's simple yet appealing design and described it as a "refined" action game for fans of battles. The Xbox port received a similar reception. Readers of Famitsu Xbox ranked it the 5th most anticipated game in Japan around its release. Zacarias praised the number of modes available to players and described the gameplay as easy to pick up and "addictively fun". He noted that the graphics were not the best on the Xbox console but still complimented them as well as the game's steady framerate during battles with many soldiers on the screen. Famitsu Xbox's four reviewers described the gameplay as enjoyable, with two of them labeling Dynasty Warriors 4 as one of the best picks of October 2003. Hirohito Aizawa noted that aside from surround sound support and slightly improved graphics, the Xbox port did not include new features over the PlayStation 2 version. Rolling Uchisawa praised the alternate history aspect and the multiple modes of play. Tagawa Rameo complimented the familiarity from previous titles in the series but commented that the game might be difficult for new players and criticized the loading times.

Criticism focused on the game's audio components. Shoemaker called the voice acting "campy" and compared it a "dubbed kung fu movie". Zacarias described the heavy metal-inspired soundtrack as outdated and mismatched to the ancient Chinese setting. He called the English voice acting "downright horrible" and stated that it made the game's dramatic dialog unintentionally humorous and "lame". Dunham echoed similar comments, calling the English voices "terrible" and "bordering on average" at best. He also expressed disappointment at the lack of a Japanese language option as well as the lack of high-end audio support on the PlayStation 2. Conversely, Leeper described the musical score as "well done" despite the hair metal aspects at times.

== Expansions ==
Dynasty Warriors 4 was followed by two expansions. The first was Dynasty Warriors 4 Xtreme Legends, which added new gameplay options and modes. The second expansion, Dynasty Warriors 4 Empires, added strategy and diplomacy to the original.

=== Dynasty Warriors 4: Xtreme Legends ===
Dynasty Warriors 4: Xtreme Legends is a stand-alone expansion to Dynasty Warriors 4 developed by Omega Force and published by Koei for the PlayStation 2. The expansion adds two levels of difficulty, two additional modes of play, and new weapons, stages, and items. The first new mode, "Xtreme Mode", features randomly generated stages and an in-game shop to purchase items. The "Legends Mode" provides unique stages and storylines for each of the 42 playable characters. Xtreme Legends allows players to import their save data from the original game and can be played without the Dynasty Warriors 4 disc. Players are also able to use the original disc to access the stages from the original Dynasty Warriors 4 and play them with the new features.

Koei announced the North American release in August 2003. Though originally expected to be released on October 4, 2003, the release was pushed back to November. To promote the game, Koei released a television ad in Japan and launched a website. The website, which launched on September 13, 2003, provided news and downloadable content related to the expansion. The website's webmaster was Ben Stockwell. On October 13, 2003, Koei announced that Xtreme Legends had gone gold and would ship to North American retailers on November 4, 2003. Following shipping, it was released in game stores a few days later on November 7, 2003. Similar to Dynasty Warriors 3: Xtreme Legends, this expansion's list price was lower than the typical PlayStation 2 games price.

Dynasty Warriors 4: Xtreme Legends was generally well received critically with an average of 72 out of 100 on Metacritics reviews. Brad Shoemaker of GameSpot noted that despite the additions, it was fundamentally very similar to the original game and is targeted at hardcore fans that already own Dynasty Warriors 4 rather than new players. Game Informer reviewer Matthew Kato also noted the similarity but commented that the new additions are worth the discounted price. Writing for Playstation 2 Magazine, Dunham summarized Xtreme Legends as "very good" and labeled it as a Bronze "PSM Must Buy" game. However, he recommended the game only for "feverishly devoted" fans or those new to the series.

=== Dynasty Warriors 4: Empires ===
Dynasty Warriors 4: Empires is the second expansion of Dynasty Warriors 4, released exclusively for the PlayStation 2. Omega Force developed the Empires expansion based on player feedback. Fans of Koei's simulation series Romance of the Three Kingdoms requested to play a game that combined the domestic policy tactics of the series with the combat from Dynasty Warriors. Because combining the two genres was difficult, the team used a more simplified system than what is in Romance of the Three Kingdoms. They also changed the combat's focus from charging an enemy general to pushing forward a front line. The main feature of the expansion is a new Empire Mode, which tasks players with uniting regions of China through choosing diplomatic strategies that influence events in battles. Other additions include an expanded Edit Mode, updated stages, and an archive with artwork, movies and other game elements. Similar to the previous expansion, players can import their save data from the original game or Xtreme Legends.

The expansion was announced in Japan in January 2004. Focus was given to the strategy aspect along with portions carried over from Dynasty Warriors 4. A March Japanese release date was also announced, which coincided with the end of Koei's 2003 financial year. Ahead of its release on March 18, 2004, Koei revealed that it would release several editions of Dynasty Warriors 4: Empires in Japan: a standalone expansion, a premium pack that includes the Xtreme Legends expansion, and a super premium pack comprising both expansions and the original game. Empires sold 187,474 units within two weeks of its Japanese release and was the 8th best-selling game the week of March 29, 2004. The next month, Ip publicized that Koei would showcase Dynasty Warriors 4: Empires at E3 in anticipation of a North American release. After E3 2004, the company launched a promotional website similar to the other Dynasty Warriors 4 titles. On August 4, 2004, Koei announced that the game had gone gold and would ship to North American retailers at the end of the month.

Dynasty Warriors 4: Empires was overall well received critically and has an average of 71 out of 100 on Metacritics reviews. In reviewing the expansion, Shoemaker commented that while the presentation had "barely changed", the combination of high-level strategy and on-the-battlefield combat works well and brought "much-needed depth to the aging" series. He further state that the title could reach a new audience outside the series' hardcore fans. Patrick Garratt of Eurogamer criticized the game's strategy and action combination, stating that it only amounts to an average game that "becomes repetitive too quickly." IGN's Ed Lewis called the strategy aspect of the gameplay an "interesting twist" and noted that the game would've benefited from a larger focus on the strategy portions. Both Garratt and Lewis compared the strategy elements to the board game Risk.
