= Romance of the Three Kingdoms III: Dragon of Destiny =

1992 video game

- Developer: Koei
- Publisher: Koei
- Composer: Minoru Mukaiya
- Series: Romance of the Three Kingdoms
- Platforms: MS-DOS, PC-98, X68000, FM Towns, PC Engine, Super NES, Genesis, Sega CD, PlayStation, Windows 95
- Release: PC-98: JP: 5 February 1992; SNES, Mega Drive: JP: 8 November 1992; NA: 1993; Mega-CD: JP: 23 April 1993; PC Engine Super CD-ROM: JP: 1 October 1993; PS: JP: 22 February 2001; Windows 95: JP: 8 June 2001
- Genre: Turn-based strategy
- Modes: Single-player, multiplayer

Romance of the Three Kingdoms III: Dragon of Destiny known as Sangokushi III in Japan, is the third in the Romance of the Three Kingdoms series of turn-based strategy games produced by Koei and based on the historical novel Romance of the Three Kingdoms. This version was released in Asia and North America for Windows, Super Nintendo Entertainment System and Mega Drive/Genesis.

== Gameplay ==
The non-combat interface

Upon starting the game, players choose from one of six scenarios that determine the initial layout of power in ancient China. The scenarios loosely depict allegiances and territories controlled by the warlords as according to the novel, although gameplay does not follow events in the novel after the game begins.

The six scenarios and the warlords present in each are listed as follows:

1. Dong Zhuo's reign of terror (AD 189)
2. Warlords struggle for power (AD 194)
3. Liu Bei seeks shelter in Xinye (AD 201)
4. Emergence of the Crouching Dragon (AD 208)
5. Rise of the Three Kingdoms (AD 221)
6. Jiang Wei inherits Kongming's legacy (AD 235)

The PC Engine CD-ROM² version includes an additional scenario:

- The Yellow Turban Rebellion (AD 184)

After choosing the scenario, players determine which warlord(s) they will control. Custom characters may be inserted into territories unoccupied by other forces. A total of 46 different cities exist, as well as hundreds of unique characters. Each character has several statistics: War Ability, Intelligence, Politics, Charisma, Army Command, Naval Command.

The player wins the game by conquering all territories in China. This is accomplished by being in control of every city on the map.

== Reception ==
Reception

Review scores
Publication	Score
Famitsu	SNES: 7/10, 7/10, 6/10, 5/10; GEN: 6/10, 7/10, 6/10, 5/10 (Note: Weekly Famitsu magazine's four reviewers each provided an individual scores Individual scores ranked out of 10.)
Electronic Entertainment	PC: 9/10
Mega	GEN: 68%

In reviewing the Super Nintendo and Sega Genesis versions, Weekly Famitsu magazine's four reviewers—Hirokazu Hamamura, George Nakaji, Miki Watanabe, and TACOX—praised the improvements over the previous entry and noted the similarity between the two ports. Nakaji described the command selection as more clear in this sequel. However, Hamamura noted that Romance of the Three Kingdoms II was easier for beginners. Similarly, Watanabe and TACOX commented that Romance of the Three Kingdoms III was geared more towards fans of the series and genre. TACOX criticized the console ports' game controls, describing the computer-based design as confusing and unhelpful. Computer Gaming World stated in April 1994 that Romance of the Three Kingdoms III offered a "wondrous" look at an era of Chinese history, praising the game's detail and flexible play options. Mega called it "[o]dd, aloof, but eventually addictive".
