= Romance of the Three Kingdoms VI: Awakening of the Dragon =

1998 video game

- North American PlayStation cover art
- Developer: Koei
- Publisher: Koei
- Director: Shigeki Nakayama
- Series: Romance of the Three Kingdoms
- Platforms: Dreamcast, Windows 95, PlayStation, PlayStation Portable
- Release: PlayStation: JP: 8 October 1998; NA: 13 April 2000; Dreamcast: JP: 25 March 1999; PlayStation Portable: JP: 9 November 2006
- Genre: Turn-based strategy
- Modes: Single-player, multiplayer

Romance of the Three Kingdoms VI: Awakening of the Dragon (三國志VI) is a turn-based strategy video game, the 6th installment in Koei's Romance of the Three Kingdoms series.

== Power up kit ==
Power up kit includes the following features:

- New tactical simulation mode. This mode consists of historical battles.
- Added events.
- 3 new scenarios, and 5 new short scenarios.
- Duel mode. This added duel tournaments.
- Logs for players activities.
- Editor customizes generals, cities, kingdoms, item creation.
