= Romance of the Three Kingdoms VIII =

2001 video game

- PAL version cover art
- Developers: Koei; Kou Shibusawa (Remake)
- Publishers: Koei; Koei Tecmo (Remake)
- Director: Kazuhiro Fujishige
- Designers: Tadayuki Irie; Daichi Akiyama; Tatsuya Ishikawa; Hisatsugu Ishikawa
- Series: Romance of the Three Kingdoms
- Platforms: Microsoft Windows, Mac OS, Nintendo Switch, PlayStation Portable, PlayStation 2, PlayStation 4, PlayStation 5
- Release: PC: JP: 29 June 2001; Mac: JP: 22 February 2002; PlayStation Portable: JP: 29 March 2007; PlayStation 2: JP: 24 January 2002; NA: 13 August 2003; EU: 26 March 2004; Remake; PlayStation 4, PlayStation 5, Nintendo Switch, Steam: WW: 24 October 2024
- Genre: Turn-based strategy
- Modes: Single-player, multiplayer

Romance of the Three Kingdoms VIII (三國志VIII) is a 2001 turn-based strategy video game developed and published by Koei for Microsoft Windows. It is the eighth installment in the Romance of the Three Kingdoms series. It was subsequently released on PlayStation 2 and Mac OS the following year. An American version of the game was released on PlayStation 2 in 2003, and a Japanese PlayStation Portable version was released in 2007, nearly 6 years after the original Windows version.

A remaster developed by Kou Shibusawa, titled Romance of the Three Kingdoms 8 Remake, featuring the base game plus all extra content in the Power Up Kit, was announced in September 2023 and was released by Koei Tecmo on PlayStation 4, PlayStation 5, Nintendo Switch, and Windows in October 2024.

== Power up kit ==
Power up kit includes following features:

- Marriage between generals, which can create offspring for married parties.
- New tactical scenario campaign mode. This mode consists of battles and event surrounding Cao Cao, Lu Xun, or Zhuge Liang. The stories change depending on how to win a given scenario.
- 3 new scenarios added after the death of Zhuge Liang. In addition, there are 60 more generals.
- Editor can change data of general and city.
- Logs for players activities.
- Improved AI.

Although the Power Up Kit features were not incorporated into PlayStation 2 version of the game, they are fully integrated into all releases of the Remake version.

== Reception ==
On release, Famitsu magazine scored the PlayStation 2 version of the game a 32 out of 40.
