= Sangokushi Battlefield =

2002 video game

- Developer(s): Koei
- Publisher(s): Koei
- Designer(s): Koei
- Series: Romance of the Three Kingdoms
- Platform(s): Windows 98
- Release: JP: 10 September 2002
- Genre(s): Real-time strategy
- Mode(s): Multiplayer

Sangokushi Battlefield (三國志 Battlefield) is Koei's real time strategy game for Windows 98, and the 2nd online Romance of the Three Kingdoms game for the PC platform. The game was simultaneously released in Japan, Taiwan, and Korea.

Japanese server began operation on August 30, 2002.

Taiwan server began operation in July 2002, and was terminated November 15, 2006.
