= Romance of the Three Kingdoms VII =

2000 video game

- Developer: Koei
- Publisher: Koei
- Director: Kazuhiro Fujishige
- Designers: Toru Endo; Takamitsu Yamamoto; Daichi Akiyama; Tadayuki Irie
- Series: Romance of the Three Kingdoms
- Platforms: Windows 95, Mac OS, PSP, PlayStation, PlayStation 2
- Release: 2000
- Genre: Turn-based strategy
- Mode: Single Player

Romance of the Three Kingdoms VII (三國志VII) is a turn-based strategy video game, the 7th installment in Koei's Romance of the Three Kingdoms series.

== Power up kit ==
Power up kit includes following features:

- Short play mode.
- New tactical simulation mode. This mode consists of battles and event surrounding the 3 kingdoms of Wei, Wu, Shu.
- Added events.
- Logs for players activities.
- Data editor.

Power up kit features are incorporated into PlayStation 2 version of the game.

== Reception ==
On release, Famitsu magazine scored the PlayStation version of the game a 30 out of 40, and the later PlayStation 2 version scored a 32 out of 40.
