= Romance of the Three Kingdoms IV: Wall of Fire =

1994 video game

- North American PlayStation cover art
- Developers: Koei; Sega (32X)
- Publisher: Koei
- Series: Romance of the Three Kingdoms
- Platforms: PC-9801, FM Towns, Super NES, 3DO Interactive Multiplayer, 32X, PlayStation, Saturn, Windows
- Release: February 1994: PC-98; JP: February 1994 Super NES; JP: December 9, 1994; NA: July 1995 3DO; JP: March 26, 1995 Saturn; JP: April 28, 1995; NA: 1995 32X; JP: July 28, 1995 PlayStation; JP: September 29, 1995; NA: March 10, 1996 Windows; NA: December 1995
- Genre: Turn-based strategy
- Modes: Single-player, multiplayer

Romance of the Three Kingdoms IV: Wall of Fire (released as Sangokushi IV in Japan) is the fourth in the Romance of the Three Kingdoms series of turn-based strategy games produced by Koei and based on the historical novel Romance of the Three Kingdoms. Romance of the Three Kingdoms IV: Wall of Fire was the last game in the series to be released on PC in the United States until Romance of the Three Kingdoms XI. This was also the last Romance of the Three Kingdoms game to be released on the Super NES.

== Gameplay ==
Gameplay is generally similar to the previous installments.

The six scenarios in this game are listed as follows:

1. Dong Zhuo seizes control of Luoyang (AD 189)
2. The Flying General roams the Central Plains (AD 194)
3. Liu Bei seeks shelter in Xinye (AD 201)
4. The Crouching Dragon soars across Red Cliffs (AD 208)
5. End of the Han Dynasty - Rise of the Three Kingdoms (AD 221)
6. A star falls at Wuzhang Plains (AD 235)

Graphics are enhanced in this game and there are additional features such as:

- Warships can make other warships catch fire
- Archers can fire flaming arrows at other soldiers and catapults
- Barbarians can be summoned to conduct raids on enemy territory
- Alliances can be formed between the player and other warlords but these are not permanent

== Power-up kit ==
A separate power-up kit was released for the Chinese and Japanese versions of the PC game, allowing further customization of characters in the game. The PlayStation and Sega Saturn ports of the game included the power-up kit.

Three additional scenarios (the first two are not based on the novel) are present in the power-up kit version:

1. The villain usurps the power of the Han Dynasty - Unification of China (AD 189)
2. Three heroes compete for power in war-ravaged China (AD 190)
3. Rise of the barbarian king (AD 225)

== Reception ==
Reception

Review scores
Publication	Score
Electronic Gaming Monthly	9/10, 7/10, 8.5/10, 8/10 (SAT)
Famitsu	28/40 (SAT); 8/10, 7/10, 6/10, 6/10 (32X)
Next Generation	3/5 (SNES, PS1)

GamePro gave the SNES version a positive review, applauding the upgraded graphics and sounds, the "subtle and even relaxing" music, and the "deep, multilayered menu system", which they said is the most accessible of any game in the series to date. They concluded, "Of course, watching numbers rise and fall really has to thrill you to enjoy any Koei game, but this time the enhanced graphics and smooth command interface seem to hide the number-crunching behind political intrigue and battle strategy. Wall of Fire adds spice to Romance." Next Generation reviewed the SNES version of the game, and stated that "It's beautiful, it's deep and it's absorbing, but it's also just a lot more of the same thing."

On release, Famicom Tsūshin scored the Sega Saturn version of the game a 28 out of 40, The four reviewers of Electronic Gaming Monthly applauded the addictive gameplay, the ability to create custom generals, and the level of depth, and commented that the FMVs of the Saturn version were an excellent upgrade to the game. GamePro, though they praised the interface and rewarding gameplay, saw the Saturn version as "virtually identical" to the SNES version.

Next Generation commented that the PlayStation version is not essentially different from the Super NES version, and lacks support for the PlayStation Mouse. They assessed the game itself as a refinement of the formula Koei had been using for years in both the Romance of the Three Kingdoms and Nobunaga's Ambition series and judged that as a result, the game was the best installment yet of an outstanding series, but would feel over-familiar to Koei's established fans. GamePro were unimpressed with the game. They remarked that it lacks any next generation enhancements aside from the full motion video and compared it unfavorably to its contemporary Iron Storm.
