= Dynasty Tactics =

2002 video game

- Developer: Koei
- Publisher: Koei
- Director: Takashi Atsumi
- Producer: Yoshiki Sugiyama
- Designer: Tomokazu Takeda
- Programmer: Tomoyuki Kitamura
- Writers: Shungo Nishimura; Ichiro Yasuda
- Composer: Mahito Yokota
- Series: Dynasty Warriors
- Platform: PlayStation 2
- Release: JP: February 28, 2002; NA: September 10, 2002; PAL: November 29, 2002
- Genre: Tactical role-playing game
- Mode: Single-player

Dynasty Tactics (三國志戦記, Sangokushi Senki; "Records of the Three Kingdoms War Chronicles" in Japan) is a strategy game developed and published by Koei for the Sony PlayStation 2. The title is set during the Three Kingdoms era and takes place after the Yellow Turban Rebellion and Dong Zhuo's death. The gameplay uses elements from Koei's in depth turn based system in the Romance of the Three Kingdoms series. While the Dynasty Warriors series is a contemporary interpretation of the setting, the mood in Dynasty Tactics is archaic and gritty, closer to the tone set in the novel. The players can choose to roughly follow events from the epic or dramatically diverge from it.

The game was followed by a sequel in 2003.

== Gameplay ==
The game is basically separated into two different phases: the planning stage (or turns) and battles. Turns occur on a bird's eye map of the area with color coded cities to differentiate the rulers of each section of the land. Each ruler is assigned a capital which will serve as their base of operations; if it falls, the lord of the land will be overthrown. From there, they can decide to check on their armies, search for civilians who will join their cause, or assign envoys to recruit men and spy on the enemy. If a ruler has enough spare officers, he can also create another army to fortify their land's defenses. Additionally, cities with no alignment can be effortlessly claimed if the player places an army on it.

Each segment of the story has set objectives with a number of turns given to decide how to complete it. Objectives are basically stepping stones for the ruler's motivation and method of conquest. For instance, Liu Bei can forge an alliance with Lu Bu or declare war on him instead. The ultimate goal of the game is to unite the land under one ruler but the method of doing so is up to the player.

Battles take place on a grid map system and are often limited to 30 days (or 30 turns). Only two forces can fight at one time and each side is allowed two armies (or eight units) in one battle. Envoys with the Spy skill can also participate in battle. Armies are composed of one commander, one strategist, and two other officers. When two allied armies are on the field, the commander with the highest leadership is designated as their side's main commander in battle. Strategists are the ones who set army formations and assist their army with a Trump action, a random event which can turn the tide of battle. Like many other strategy games, battles are won when the leading enemy commander is forced to flee.

Moving on the map is similar to chess in that unit types have varying levels of movement (i.e.: horsemen can move more squares forward than the footmen). The order of each unit is decided by whoever has the highest morale during a day of battle. The battlefield's terrain also affects how armies can proceed on the map. After a successful move, the army will be asked to face either north, south, west, or east. Their positioning affects the unit's capability to defend from attacks or help allies.

When a square within a unit's movement range is red, the particular unit can perform a special command called a Tactic. These commands vary with each job class; some are purely offensive, while others only target morale or aid allies. If two or more units are in a position to use their tactics together, they can perform a combo to double or even triple the tactics' effects. The combo's length is decided by the amount of generals who can perform their techniques during one attack. As the combo grows in length, the animations for the tactics look visually more impressive. Strategists can also choose to create a fragile yet handy Tactics Link, which gives allies a combo multiplier from their tactics at any position on the map. Tactic combos are the ideal way to quickly end a battle and save resources. Combos are also the most convenient way to capture an enemy general and have them serve the player's army.

All officers are also given unique buffs that are triggered by unit placement or morale.

== Reception ==
Reception

Aggregate scores
| Aggregator | Score |
|---|---|
| GameRankings | 77.64% |
| Metacritic | 79/100 |

Review scores
| Publication | Score |
|---|---|
| AllGame | 4/5 |
| Edge | 8/10 |
| Game Informer | 8/10 |
| GamePro | 4/5 |
| GameSpot | 8.2/10 |
| GameSpy | 4/5 |
| IGN | 7.6/10 |
| Official U.S. PlayStation Magazine | 4.5/5 |
| X-Play | 3/5 |

Dynasty Tactics was met with positive reception upon release; GameRankings gave it a score of 77.64%, while Metacritic gave it 79 out of 100. It won GameSpot's 2002 "Best Game No One Played on PlayStation 2" award.
