= Dynasty Tactics 2 =

2003 video game

- North American PlayStation 2 box art
- Developer: Koei
- Publisher: Koei
- Producer: Kunihiro Shirahata
- Composers: Mahito Yokota; Masato Koike
- Series: Dynasty Warriors
- Platforms: PlayStation 2, PlayStation Network
- Release: PlayStation 2: JP: June 26, 2003; NA: September 24, 2003; PAL: November 28, 2003; PlayStation Network: NA: July 9, 2013
- Genre: Tactical role-playing game
- Mode: Single-player

Dynasty Tactics 2 (三國志戦記2, Sangokushi Senki 2; "Records of the Three Kingdoms War Chronicles 2" in Japan) is the sequel to Koei's Dynasty Tactics. The game has 84 stages, roughly 200 different battle and strategy events, and 96 different tactics, which is near double the last game's number.

== Gameplay ==
Unlike the first title, players are limited to starting Liu Bei's story at the start of the game for the prologue feature. Afterwards, they can choose Liu Bei, Cao Cao, Sun Ce, or Lu Bu's stories. Lu Bu's daughter debuts in this game and can be used as part of his armies.

Recruited officers can be employed as spies to infiltrate enemy forces and sneak into cities. There are two possible routes to travel:

If a spy is sent into an enemy-occupied city, then there is a chance the spy will be caught and be sent back to the player's home base. Alternatively, if the spy isn't caught, then the player can perform different Ruses against the enemy army. These Ruses cost Craft points. Also, the player can take a more in-depth view of the enemy army, including who are friends of the enemy officers. If the spy is a friend of the enemy officer, then he may visit said officer. Sometimes, the officer will be convinced to defect.

If the spy is placed in a city with a civilian, and that civilian is friends with the spy, at the end of the turn, the civilian will request to join the player's army.

Cities may now be explored, and players can access barracks, mystics, and town squares. Barracks: Here, the player can buy additional Tactics using Craft points, which are earned by defeating officers and winning battles. The player can buy the same tactic over and over, but each time the price increases.

Mystics: If visited, the Mystic will help the player by offering advice, different items, and additional Tactics.

Town square: When an officer visits a town square, battle advice will be given, his or her stats will increase, or an enemy bandit unit will be created somewhere on the map. Bandit units are usually weak and provide decent experience if defeated.

Players are evaluated at the end of a battle based on special criteria.

Tactics can now be chained, being consecutively executed in a single turn. Within a Chain Tactic, each accomplished tactic will increase the chance that the next will succeed.

Strategists can perform two separate commands, which are the Order Chain and Link commands. Order Chain: When this command is used, the strategist will sacrifice 5 morale to affect allied officers within a certain area. If in range, then the allied officer's hands will glow blue, and he or she can perform a chain tactic, providing the conditions are fulfilled before the chain continues. The effects of an Order Chain command will wear off if the allied officer is attacked.

Link: Returning feature from previous title. After this command is ordered, the next allied tactic performed on a different target will activate the tactic that was linked. This allows the player to achieve tactical combos on enemy officers who aren't next to each other and increase the chance of success and damage for the linked tactic. However, if the enemy that was linked has a turn before an allied officer performs a tactic, the link is broken.

== Reception ==
Reception

Aggregate scores
Aggregator	Score
GameRankings	75.81%
Metacritic	78/100

Review scores
Publication	Score
Computer and Video Games	6/10
Edge	8/10
Electronic Gaming Monthly	7.5/10
Game Informer	7.5/10
GamePro	4/5
GameSpot	8.2/10
GameSpy	4/5
GameZone	8.1/10
IGN	8.3/10
Official U.S. PlayStation Magazine	4/5

Dynasty Tactics 2 was met with positive reception, albeit slightly less than the first game. GameRankings gave it a score of 75.81%, while Metacritic gave it 78 out of 100.
