= Romance of the Three Kingdoms II =

1989 video game

- Game cover for the NES version
- Developer: Koei
- Publisher: Koei
- Composer: Minoru Mukaiya
- Series: Romance of the Three Kingdoms
- Platforms: MS-DOS, PC-8801, PC-9801, MSX2, Amiga, NES, Super NES, Genesis, WonderSwan, PlayStation, Windows 95
- Release: JP: 1989 (PC-8801, PC-9801); JP: 2 November 1990 (NES); JP: 15 September 1991 (SNES); JP: 26 December 1991 (Mega Drive); JP: 1991 (Amiga); JP: 6 April 2000 (WonderSwan); JP: 3 August 2000 (PlayStation); JP: 15 December 2000 (Windows 95); NA: May 1992 (SNES); NA: September 1991 (NES); NA: 1992 (Genesis)
- Genre: Turn-based strategy
- Modes: Single-player, multiplayer

Romance of the Three Kingdoms II (Japanese: 三國志II, Hepburn: Sangokushi Tsū; lit. "Three Kingdoms II") is the second in the Romance of the Three Kingdoms series of turn-based strategy games produced by Koei and based on the historical novel Romance of the Three Kingdoms.

== Gameplay ==
Upon starting the game, players choose from one of six scenarios that determine the initial layout of power in ancient China. The scenarios loosely depict allegiances and territories controlled by the warlords as according to the novel, although gameplay does not follow events in the novel after the game begins.

The six scenarios are listed as follows:

1. Dong Zhuo seizes control of Luoyang (AD 189)
2. Warlords struggle for power (AD 194)
3. Liu Bei seeks shelter in Jing Province (AD 201)
4. Cao Cao covets supremacy over China (AD 208)
5. The empire divides into three (AD 215)
6. Rise of Wei, Wu and Shu (AD 220)

After choosing the scenario, players determine which warlord(s) they will control. Custom characters may be inserted into territories unoccupied by other forces, as well. A total of 41 different provinces exist, as well as over 200 unique characters. Each character has three statistics, which range from 10 to 100 (the higher the better). A warlord's Intelligence, War Ability and Charm influence how successful he or she will be when performing certain tasks, such as dueling or increasing land value in a province.

The player wins the game by conquering all territories in China. This is accomplished by being in control of every province on the map.

== New features ==
- A reputation system that affects the rate of officers' loyalties towards their lords
- Added treasures and special items that can increase an officer's stats
- Advisers can help their lords predict the chances of success in executing a plan. An adviser with Intelligence stat of 100 will always accurately predict the result.
- Intercepting messengers
- Ability to create new lords on the map based on custom characters created by players

== Reception ==
Computer Gaming World stated that Romance of the Three Kingdoms II "did a better job of simulating the chaos of" second-century China than the game's predecessor. In a 1993 survey of pre 20th-century strategy games the magazine gave the game four stars out of five. On release, Famicom Tsūshin scored the Famicom version of the game a 30 out of 40.
