= Romance of the Three Kingdoms XI =

2006 video game

- North American PlayStation 2 box art
- Developer: Koei
- Publisher: Koei
- Director: Shinji Imura
- Designers: Hisatsugu Ishikawa; Hitoshi Yamamoto; Makoto Yoshida; Kushinsai Nakamiwa; Ichiro Yasuda; Toshiyuki Kobayashi; Yukinori Ito; Sho Maeno; Toru Endo
- Composer: Yoshihiro Ike
- Series: Romance of the Three Kingdoms
- Platforms: Microsoft Windows, PlayStation 2, Wii
- Release: Microsoft Windows: JP: 17 March 2006; JP: 8 September 2006 (With Power Up Kit); EU: 5 September 2008; NA: 9 September 2008; PlayStation 2: JP: 28 September 2006; JP: 21 March 2007 (With PUK); NA: 6 February 2007; Wii: JP: 21 March 2007 (With PUK)
- Genre: Turn-based strategy
- Modes: Single player, Multiplayer

Romance of the Three Kingdoms XI, also known as Sangokushi 11 (三國志11), is the 11th installment in the Romance of the Three Kingdoms (Sangokushi) grand strategy game series by Koei. The game was released for the PC on March 17, 2006 in Japan. A Traditional Chinese version was released on July 27 in Taiwan.

A PlayStation 2 version was released on September 28, 2006 in Japan and on February 6, 2007 in North America. A Wii version was released on March 21, 2007 for the Japanese market at a premium price of ¥9,800.

The premium version includes a walkthrough, a tactical map, four cards illustrated by Tsuyoshi Nagano, and an orchestra soundtrack CD. The Chinese version of the premium version includes a walkthrough and a map.

An official English version for the PC was announced on April 23, 2008, and was planned to be released in North America on July 29. However, the release date was delayed until September 9, 2008. There is an expansion pack for the PC version, but it was not included in the English version and is available only in Asian markets. This marked the Koei reintroduction of a PC version of the Romance of the Three Kingdoms series for the English market which had not happened since November 30, 1995, with the American release of Romance of the Three Kingdoms IV: Wall of Fire.

Some of the 3D models in this game were borrowed from Dynasty Warriors 4.

32 historical characters not from the Three Kingdoms era can be unlocked after the player completes all the game tutorials.

== Power-up kit ==
The power-up kit adds the following features:

- Similar neighboring facilities can be combined.
- 10 new city facilities.
- Generals can research new abilities. Over 50 abilities are available based on attack, defense, administration, and strategy.
- A new battle game mode, which allows playing preset battle scenarios.
- 6 new campaign scenarios, and 30 new events.
- Editor can alter generals, cities, kingdoms, equipment.
- New voices. Player can choose between Mandarin or Japanese voices.
- A new "Super" (超級) game difficulty setting.
- Duel success rate.
- A friendlier command dialogue during research and waging wars. For example, when assigning generals to perform a task, a dialogue box will show items and time needed to perform the task.
- A new national research subject named "Internal administration" (内政).
- New military features including:

- Can assign troops to transport supplies to specific camps.
- Improved AI.
- Seize items.
- Enhanced facilities and strategy including:

- Increased effects for fortresses, and heightened status recovery rate.
- Increased range for drum tower, increasing the chance for successfully entering a duel.
- When using spearman strategies to destroy troops, the trap effect increases.
- When using cavalry strategies to trap troops, the chances for capturing enemy generals increase.

The power-up kit was sold separately for the Windows version, and standard for the Wii version.

Koei offered the power-up kit in Japanese and Traditional Chinese. They never made or sold an English version, despite good sales for the game.

=== PS2 and Wii with power-up kit version ===
It adds following:

- 2 scenario for total 16 scenario, 8 stage scenario, and 20 duels. The Chibi scenario from the PC power-up kit is unlocked.
- Special events for when completing certain events.
- Adds 50 characters from Bandit Kings of Ancient China.
- New Action mode (Wii only).

== Reception ==
IGN praised the length and depth of the game, saying it "packs literally hundreds of hours of play time on its single disc", but criticized the pace of the game, saying players will "have to endure an almost relentless level of tedium." and "It will bore to tears most of the jump cut-addled, MTV-watching, Ritalin-popping masses due to a sometimes excruciatingly slow pace." GameSpot had a similar view, "The strategy is complex and rewarding, but the menu shuffling and extremely slow pace won't earn the series any new fans." Games Radar emphasised that Kingdoms XI would mainly appeal to fans of the series, "...addicts that have kept up with the series and crave more of its rare gameplay will eat it up. Gamers that have never cared about or have never heard of the series don't have any reasons to give it a whirl." 1UP.com called the game's learning curve "intimidating" even for veteran strategy gamers, but praised "the top-notch writing, nifty historical setting, and unique aesthetic", claiming "the game gives you everything you could want from a turn-based tactics extravaganza."
