= Romance of the Three Kingdoms (video game series) =

- Romance of the Three Kingdoms for the Nintendo Entertainment System, with the logo in the bottom-right corner
- Genre: Strategy
- Developer: Koei (now Kou Shibusawa)
- Publisher: Koei (now Koei Tecmo)
- Creator: Yōichi Erikawa
- First release: Romance of the Three Kingdoms; 10 December 1985
- Latest release: Romance of the Three Kingdoms XIV; 16 January 2020
- Spin-offs: Dynasty Warriors

Romance of the Three Kingdoms

Chinese name
- Traditional Chinese: 三國志
- Simplified Chinese: 三国志
- Literal meaning: Records of the Three Kingdoms
Transcriptions
Standard Mandarin
- Hanyu Pinyin: Sānguózhì

Vietnamese name
- Vietnamese: Tam quốc chí
- Hán-Nôm: 三國志

Korean name
- Hangul: 삼국지
- Hanja: 三國志
Transcriptions
- Revised Romanization: Samgugji

Japanese name
- Kanji: 三國志
- Hiragana: さんごくし
Transcriptions
- Revised Hepburn: Sangokushi

Romance of the Three Kingdoms (三國志, Sangokushi; lit. "Records of the Three Kingdoms") is a series of turn-based tactical role-playing simulation grand strategy wargames produced by Koei. Originating from Japan in 1985, fourteen installments of the game have been published in Japan, Taiwan, China, South Korea and North America to date. While the game's title as it was released in English refers to the 14th century historical novel Romance of the Three Kingdoms (三國演義) by Luo Guanzhong, the title as it was released in Japan and Chinese regions refers to the 3rd century historical text Records of the Three Kingdoms (三國志) by Chen Shou.

== Overview ==
The series is based on the romanticized Romance of the Three Kingdoms novel and the historical text Records of the Three Kingdoms. The storyline takes place during the Han dynasty in China with many warring factions that included the Shu Han, Cao Wei and Eastern Wu kingdoms. Gameplay revolves around managing numerical statistics, each representing an attribute of a city or a character. A city is described by statistics such as stored grain supplies, vulnerability to disasters such as floods and earthquakes, treasury funds, domestic affairs and populace loyalty. Characters are numerically characterized by their leadership abilities, melee prowess, intellects and loyalty, as well as special traits or even magical abilities that can be called upon whether during wartime, diplomacy or domestic affairs. Players can increase these numbers before waging war on neighbouring territories or intending diplomatic efforts.

While generally presented as a turn-based strategy game, the seventh, eighth and tenth editions offer role-playing features, allowing the player to play as a rank-and-file character instead of leading a kingdom.

Several spin-offs based on the series include the tactical action hack and slash video game series Dynasty Warriors, Dynasty Tactics which is a hybrid of Dynasty Warriors and Romance of the Three Kingdoms, as well as the three tactical role-playing games Sangokushi Eiketsuden (Liu Bei), Sangokushi Koumeiden (Zhuge Liang), and Sangokushi Sousouden (Cao Cao). Kessen II is a real-time tactics game on PS2.

Another spin-off is the mobile game Three Kingdoms Tactics, based on Koei Tecmo's series. It was published by Chinese company Alibaba Group in September 2019. It has grossed $1.2 billion worldwide as of March 2021, making it Alibaba's most successful mobile game.

== List of games in the series ==
The release dates provided are for original Japanese releases.

=== Main series ===
Release timeline
1985	Romance of the Three Kingdoms
1986
1987
1988
1989	Romance of the Three Kingdoms II
1990
1991
1992	III: Dragon of Destiny
1993
1994	IV: Wall of Fire
1995	Romance of the Three Kingdoms V
1996	VI: Awakening of the Dragon
1997
1998
1999
2000	Romance of the Three Kingdoms VII
2001	Romance of the Three Kingdoms VIII
2002
2003	Romance of the Three Kingdoms IX
2004	Romance of the Three Kingdoms X
2005
2006	Romance of the Three Kingdoms XI
2007
2008
2009
2010
2011
2012	Romance of the Three Kingdoms XII
2013
2014
2015
2016	Romance of the Three Kingdoms XIII
2017
2018
2019
2020	Romance of the Three Kingdoms XIV

- Romance of the Three Kingdoms (1985, PC-88) – Also available on Amiga, MS-DOS, PC-98, MSX, NES (1988), FM-7, Sharp X1, X68000, WonderSwan, Windows (2003), mobile phones.
- Romance of the Three Kingdoms II (1989, PC-88) – Also available on Amiga, MS-DOS, MSX2, NES, SNES, Mega Drive (1989), X68000, WonderSwan, Windows (2000), mobile phones
- Romance of the Three Kingdoms III: Dragon of Destiny (1992, PC-98) – Also available on MS-DOS, SNES, Mega Drive (1992), Windows (2001), NDS (2006)
- Romance of the Three Kingdoms IV: Wall of Fire (1994, PC-98) – Also available on SNES, 32X, MS-DOS, Sega Saturn, PlayStation (1994), Game Boy Advance, Windows (2001), NDS (2007)
- Romance of the Three Kingdoms V (1995, PC-98) – Also available on Sega Saturn, PlayStation, Windows (1995), PlayStation Portable (2005), NDS (2010), 3DS (2013)
- Romance of the Three Kingdoms VI: Awakening of the Dragon (1996, Windows) – Also available on PlayStation, Dreamcast (1999), PlayStation Portable (2005)
- Romance of the Three Kingdoms VII (2000, Windows) – Also available on PlayStation, PlayStation 2 (2000), PlayStation Portable (2006)
- Romance of the Three Kingdoms VIII (2001, Windows) – Also available on PlayStation 2 (2002), PlayStation Portable (2007)
- Romance of the Three Kingdoms IX (2003, Windows) – Also available on PlayStation 2 (2004), PlayStation Portable (2011)
- Romance of the Three Kingdoms X (2004, Windows) – Also available on PlayStation 2 (2005)
- Romance of the Three Kingdoms XI (2006, Windows) – Also available on PlayStation 2 (2006), Wii (2007)
- Romance of the Three Kingdoms XII (2012, Windows) – Also available on PlayStation 3, Wii U (2012), PlayStation Vita (2013)
- Romance of the Three Kingdoms XIII (2016, PlayStation 3, PlayStation 4, Xbox One and Windows) – Also available on Nintendo Switch and PlayStation Vita (2017)
- Romance of the Three Kingdoms XIV (2020, Windows, PlayStation 4, Nintendo Switch)

=== Other games ===
- Super Sangokushi (SNES)
- Sangokushi Eiketsuden (SNES)
- Sangokushi Koumeiden
- Sangokushi Sousouden
- Sangokushi Internet (1999, Windows) - Koei's first online video game of the series, developed by Koei Taiwan.
- Kessen II (2001, PS2)
- Dynasty Tactics (2002, PS2)
- Sangokushi Battlefield (2002, Windows)
- Dynasty Tactics 2 (2003, PS2)
- Sangokushi Online (2007, Windows )
- Yo-kai Sangokushi (2015, Nintendo 3DS) - Crossover with Level-5's Yo-Kai Watch series
- Sangokushi Mobile (Mobile phones)
- Sangokushi Mobile 2 (Mobile phones)
- Sangokushi Mobile 3 (Mobile phones)
- Romance of the Three Kingdoms Touch (2009, iOS)
- Romance of the Three Kingdoms 2 (2010, iOS)
- Three Kingdoms Heroes (2025, Apple Arcade)

== Reception ==
Sangokushi received positive critical reception in North America when it was released there in 1988.

As of 2020, the main series has shipped more than 9 million copies worldwide.

== See also ==
- Nobunaga's Ambition
- Destiny of an Emperor
- Bandit Kings of Ancient China
