= Hirohiko Kakegawa =

Japanese actor, voice actor and narrator

- 掛川 裕彦
- Born: October 11, 1959 (age 66)
- Occupation: Voice actor
- Notable credit: Dracule Mihawk from One Piece

Hirohiko Kakegawa (掛川 裕彦, Kakegawa Hirohiko; born October 11, 1959) is a Japanese actor, voice actor and narrator from Saitama Prefecture.

== Biography ==
Kakegawa was born on October 11, 1959, in Saitama Prefecture. He graduated from Waseda University. After university he primarily worked in local government, until he decided to quit his job and become a voice actor. He debuted in the television anime Saint Seiya. Kakegawa hid his change in career from his parents until they discovered his deception after seeing his name in the credits for Gegege no Kitaro.

== Filmography ==
=== Anime ===
Year	Title	Credit	Source
1986	Saint Seiya	Lionette Baron, Chief of Staff	
1987	Esper Mami	Boatman, Conductor, security guard, assorted extras	
1990	Chibi Maruko-chan; First Phase!	Prof. Togawa, Assorted extras	
1991	Gingko Warning!	Tanaka Yama, Bad Cow	
1999	GTO	Koji Sanimaru, assorted extras	
2004	One Piece	Hamburger, Dracule Mihawk (ep. 461-present)	
2006	Death Note	Rosewood Holly, English Teacher,	
2011	Nintama Rantaro Ninjitsu Gakuen All Emergence!	Tobe Shinsei Uemon, Amege	
2016	This Art Club Has a Problem!	Prof. Oyama	

=== Anime film ===
Year	Title	Role	Note
1999	Princess Knight	Sir Nylon	
2015	Chibi Maruko-chan: A Boy from Italy	Prof. Togawa, Shigeo Sasaki	
2021	Pretty Guardian Sailor Moon Eternal The Movie	Rei's Grandfather	2-Part film, Season 4 of Sailor Moon Crystal (Dead Moon arc)

=== Video games ===
Year	Title	Credit	Source
1991	Dragon Slayer: The Legend of Heroes	Gail	
1993	Ys IV: The Dawn of Ys	Jeff	
1994	Emerald Dragon	Karushwaru	
1997	Dynasty Warriors	Zhang Fei, Taishi Ci	
1999	SD Gundam G Generation	Oy Nung, Detrov Kossel	
2000	Dynasty Warriors 2	Zhang Fei, Taishi Ci	
2001	Dynasty Warriors 3	Zhang Fei, Taishi Ci	
2002	Star Wars: Galactic Battlegrounds	C-3PO	
2003	Dynasty Warriors 4	Zhang Fei, Taishi Ci	
2005	Dynasty Warriors 5	Zhang Fei, Taishi Ci	
2007	Dynasty Warriors 6	Zhang Fei, Taishi Ci	
2011	Dynasty Warriors 7	Zhang Fei, Taishi Ci	
2011	The Legend of Heroes: Trails to Azure	Samuel Rocksmith	
2012	Digimon World Re:Digitize	Sebastian	
2013	Dynasty Warriors 8	Zhang Fei, Taishi Ci	
2013	One Piece: Pirate Warriors 2	Hamburger, Dracule Mihawk	
2016	Ys VIII: Lacrimosa of Dana	Captain Barbaros, Hydra	
2016	Persona 5	Kunikazu Okumura	
2017	One Piece: Pirate Warriors 3	Hamburger, Dracule Mihawk	
2018	The Legend of Heroes: Trails of Cold Steel IV	Samuel Rocksmith	
2018	Dynasty Warriors 9	Zhang Fei, Taishi Ci	
2019	Persona 5 Royal	Kunikazu Okumura	
2020	One Piece: Pirate Warriors 4	Hamburger, Dracule Mihawk	
2021	The Legend of Heroes: Trails Through Daybreak	Samuel Rocksmith	
2024	The Legend of Heroes: Trails Beyond the Horizon	Samuel Rocksmith	

=== Dubbing ===
==== Live action Japanese dubbing ====
Title	Role	Voice dub for	Notes	Source
15 Minutes	Robert Hawkins	Kelsey Grammer		
Dynasty Warriors	Zhang Fei	Justin Cheung		
I Love Trouble	Sam Smotherman / Ernesto Vargas	Saul Rubinek		
Independence Day	Dr. Brackish Okun	Brent Spiner		
Independence Day: Resurgence	Dr. Brackish Okun	Brent Spiner		
The Long Kiss Goodnight	Hal	Tom Amandes		
Pleasantville	George Parker	William H. Macy		

=== Animation Japanese dubbing ===
Title	Role	Notes	Source
Thomas & Friends	Jeremiah Jobling		

== Discography ==
Title	Year	Album details	Peak chart positions		Sales
Title	Year	Album details	JPN	JPN Hot	Sales
One Piece Nippon Jūdan! 47 Cruise CD in Tokushima Umi wo Mitsumeru Me	2015	Released: 28 January 2015; Label: avex pictures; Formats: CD	101	—	—
"—" denotes releases that did not chart or were not released in that region.
