= Yukitoshi Hori =

Japanese actor, voice actor and narrator

- 堀 之紀
- Born: Setagaya, Tokyo, Japan
- Occupations: Actor; voice actor; narrator
- Agent: Aoni Production
- Relatives: Hideyuki Hori (brother)

Yukitoshi Hori (堀 之紀, Hori Yukitoshi) is a Japanese actor, voice actor and narrator from Setagaya, Tokyo. He is the elder brother of fellow voice actor Hideyuki Hori and is currently represented by Aoni Production.

He is most known for the roles of Tokumaru Tatsumi (Saint Seiya), Dodoria, Android 19 (Dragon Ball Z), Gin (Detective Conan), and Robert McGuire (Crayon Shin-chan).

== Filmography ==
=== Television animation ===
- Fist of the North Star (1984), Jadou
- Highschool! Kimengumi (1985), Danji Kai
- Saint Seiya (1986), Tokumaru Tatsumi
- Sakigake!! Otokojuku (1988), Gekkou, Student No.2
- Tsuide ni Tonchinkan (1988), Unba
- Soreike! Anpanman (1988), Amagumora (1st), Denkinamazuman, Hasamikuwagata, Toudaiman (2nd)
- Dragon Ball Z (1989), Android #19, Dodoria
- Dragon Ball Z: Bardock – The Father of Goku (1990 special), Dodoria
- Oniisama E... (1991), Physician (ep 29)
- Kinnikuman: Kinnikusei Oui Soudatsu-hen (1991), Neptuneman/The Samurai
- Dragon Quest: Dai no Daiboken (1991), Herohero
- Aoki Densetsu Shoot! (1993), Taichi Kawashima
- Mobile Suit Victory Gundam (1993), Goze Barl, Rasteo
- Nintama Rantaro (1993), Ikataro, Yuhta Imai
- Iron Leaguer (1993), GZ
- Marmalade Boy (1994), Reiji Tsuchiya (eps 64–76)
- Mobile Fighter G Gundam (1994), Carlos Andalusia
- Kuso Kagaku Sekai Gulliver Boy (1995), Eagle (eps 5–8)
- Detective Conan (1996), Gin
- Gegege no Kitarō (1996)
- Dragon Ball GT (1996), Android #19
- After War Gundam X (1996), Jenos Crisis, Romanov (eps 25–26, 28)
- Slayers Try (1997), Erulogos
- Manmaru the Ninja Penguin (1997), Gio
- Gasaraki (1998), Brigadier General Dole
- Crayon Shin-chan (1998), Robert McGuire
- Blue Gender (1999), Robert Bradley
- Inuyasha (2000), Tree of Human Faced Fruit (eps 57–58)
- S-CRY-ed (2001), Dread Red
- Final Fantasy: Unlimited (2001), Knave
- Mirage of Blaze (2002), Masamune Date, Shingen Takeda
- Kaleido Star (2003), Marine Park Owner
- Zoids: Fuzors (2003), Marvis
- GUNxSWORD (2005), Boat's captain (ep 7)
- Gintama (2006), Hayashi Ryuuzan
- Code Geass: Lelouch of the Rebellion (2006), Commanding Officer (ep 1)
- Yatterman (2008), Muscle Gatten (ep 51)
- Strike Witches (2008), Vice-captain (eps 2, 11)
- Dragon Ball Kai (2009), Cyborg #19
- Doraemon (2011), Dice Choboichi

=== Theatrical animation ===
- Tatakae!! Ramenman (1988), Soki
- Dragon Ball Z: Dead Zone (1989), Sansho
- Dragon Ball Z: Lord Slug (1991), Medamatcha
- Coo: Tooi Umi Kara Kita Coo (1993), Blackcap
- Dragon Ball Z: Fusion Reborn (1995), Captain Ginyu
- Case Closed: Countdown to Heaven (2001), Gin
- Blue Gender: The Warrior (2002), Robert
- Doraemon: Nobita and the Strange Wind Rider (2003), Wind Guide C
- Armored Trooper Votoms: Pailsen Files (2009)
- Detective Conan: The Raven Chaser (2009), Gin
- Detective Conan: The Darkest Nightmare (2016), Gin
- Detective Conan: Black Iron Submarine (2023), Gin

=== Original video animation ===
- Crying Freeman (1988), Yakuza B (ep 1)
- Saint Seiya: The Hades Chapter - Sanctuary (2002), Tokumaru Tatsumi
- Hijikata Toshizo: Shiro no Kiseki (2004), Kamo Serizawa

=== Video games ===
- Cal III (1994), Poseidon
- AbalaBurn (1998), Bian, Pooly's teacher, Abyss/Avis
- Dynasty Warriors 2 (2000), Dong Zhuo, Lu Meng
- Grandia 2 (2000), Skye
- Metal Gear Solid (1998), Vulcan Raven
- Dynasty Warriors 3 (2001), Dong Zhuo, Lu Meng
- Dragon Ball Z: Budokai (2003), Android 19, Dodoria
- Dynasty Warriors 4 (2003), Dong Zhuo, Lu Meng
- Metal Gear Solid 3: Snake Eater (2004), The Sorrow
- Castlevania: Curse of Darkness (2005), Zead
- Dynasty Warriors 5 (2005), Dong Zhuo, Lu Meng
- JoJo's Bizarre Adventure: Phantom Blood (2006), Dire
- Dynasty Warriors 6 (2007), Dong Zhuo, Lu Meng
- Warriors Orochi (2007), Dong Zhuo, Lu Meng
- Warriors Orochi 2 (2008), Dong Zhuo, Lu Meng
- Ninja Gaiden Sigma 2 (2009), Marbu
- Dynasty Warriors 7 (2011), Dong Zhuo, Lu Meng
- Warriors Orochi 3 (2011), Dong Zhuo, Lu Meng
- Warriors: Legends of Troy (2011), Ajax
- Dynasty Warriors 8 (2013), Dong Zhuo, Lu Meng
- Digimon Story: Cyber Sleuth (2015), Craniamon
- Persona 5 (2016), Ichiryusai Madarame
- Kamen Rider: Battride War Genesis (2016), Kamen Rider ZX
- Digimon Story: Cyber Sleuth - Hacker's Memory (2017), Craniamon

=== Television ===
- Mirai Sentai Timeranger (2000), Narrator
- Tokusou Sentai Dekaranger (2004), Wojonian Jinche
- Ultraman Max (2005), Alien Zetton
- Kamen Rider Hibiki DVD (2005), Akane Taka, Kiaka Shishi
- Madan Senki Ryukendo (2006), Rock Crimson
- Juken Sentai Gekiranger (2007), Confrontation-Fist Hermit Crab Fist Dokariya

=== Dubbing ===
- 2 Days in the Valley, Dosmo Pizzo (Danny Aiello)
- Breakdown, Earl (M. C. Gainey)
- Dynasty Warriors, Dong Zhuo (Lam Suet)
- Hulk, Glenn Talbot (Josh Lucas)
- The Nutty Professor, Dean Richmond (Larry Miller)
