= Dynasty Warriors: Strikeforce =

2009 video game

- Developer: Omega Force
- Publishers: Koei (PSP); Koei Tecmo (PS3, Xbox 360)
- Series: Dynasty Warriors
- Platforms: PlayStation Portable, PlayStation 3, Xbox 360
- Release: PlayStation Portable: JP: February 26, 2009; NA: April 28, 2009; EU: May 1, 2009; AU: May 7, 2009; PlayStation 3, Xbox 360: JP: October 1, 2009; NA: February 16, 2010; EU: February 19, 2010
- Genre: Hack and slash
- Modes: Single-player, multiplayer

Dynasty Warriors: Strikeforce, originally released in Japan as Shin Sangokumusou Multi Raid (真・三國無双 MULTI RAID, Shin Sangokumusō Maruchi Reido), is a hack and slash video game for the PlayStation Portable. It is based on Dynasty Warriors 6. It was released in February 2009 in Japan and Q2 2009 in North America, Europe, and Australia. A console release of the game for the PlayStation 3 and Xbox 360 was released in Japan on October 1, 2009. American and European versions followed in February 2010. Its sequel, Shin Sangokumusou Multi Raid 2, was released in Japan on March 11, 2010 for the PlayStation Portable, and on July 26, 2012 for PlayStation 3.

== Gameplay ==
This iteration of the franchise introduced features such as Awakenings (known as Shin Musou Kakusei in Japan) which were similar to an upgraded version of Musou Rage from Dynasty Warriors 5 also known as "Fury form". The Awakening drastically affects the appearance of the character and increases their stats. Characters saw more capability for customization, as in addition to the ability to equip weapons and accessories seen in the previous franchise entries, characters could now equip a sub-weapon (with no restriction on weapon type by character) which can be switched to with the circle button, along with orbs and chi to alter stats. Orbs give special bonuses to a weapon, and can increase attack power, range, and more while Chi items give unique abilities such as additional jumps, stronger attacks, Fury form usage reduction, and actual floating. Strikeforce would introduce a more RPG style of leveling where characters would get a small increase in stats as they leveled up to a cap of 50; weapons also received a leveling system.

The handheld version of Dynasty Warriors would also introduce ad hoc online multiplayer to the series. The multiplayer mode allows you to pair up with up to three other players to participate together in raids and even against each other. Before participating in a mission players can rest or undergo preparation in a small hub complete with an academy, workshop, blacksmith, storehouse, and shrine.

== Characters ==
The following table lists the character rosters for Dynasty Warriors: Strikeforce as well as Shin Sangokumusou Multi Raid 2, the latter of which does not see release beyond Japan.

* Denotes characters who are playable in the PlayStation 3/Xbox 360 HD versions and Multi Raid 2 only
** Denotes characters who are playable in Shin Sangokumusou: Multi Raid 2 only

Shu	Wei	Wu	Other
Guan Ping	Cai Wenji**	Da Qiao**	Diao Chan
Guan Yu	Cao Cao	Gan Ning	Dong Zhuo
Huang Zhong	Cao Pi	Huang Gai	Fu Xi**
Jiang Wei**	Cao Ren	Ling Tong	Lu Bu
Liu Bei	Dian Wei	Lu Meng	Meng Huo*
Ma Chao	Xiahou Dun	Lu Xun	Mu Wang**
Pang Tong	Xiahou Yuan	Sun Ce	Nu Wa**
Wei Yan	Xu Huang	Sun Jian	San Zang**
Yue Ying	Xu Zhu	Sun Quan	Sun Wukong**
Zhang Fei	Zhang He	Sun Shang Xiang	Xi Wang Mu**
Zhao Yun	Zhang Liao	Taishi Ci	Xiang Yu**
Zhuge Liang	Zhen Ji	Xiao Qiao	Yu Mei Ren**
		Zhou Tai	Yuan Shao
		Zhou Yu	Zhang Jiao

== Development ==
Dynasty Warriors: Strikeforce was first seen in Weekly Shonen Jump in the issue of the week ending September 13, 2008, and would then be featured in the Famitsu magazine in the issue of the week ending September 20. Famitsu showed the Shin Musou Kakusei appearances of Zhao Yun, Xiahou Dun and Sun Shang Xiang as well as screenshots.

The game was set to be released in March but was delayed by Koei, as well as the other Dynasty Warriors 6 spin-off, Dynasty Warriors 6: Empires.

A demo mode was made available via the Japanese site, that could be downloaded onto the PSP. The demo allowed the player to use all characters from the three kingdoms, however, just a few hours after release, a code was discovered that made all the 'other' type characters also available for use. The code is now no longer available, after a lawsuit threat from Koei. The demo had a level cap of three, and had only three stages, although all weapons were available for use.

A console version demo was released on the Japanese store, which had six characters (Zhao Yun, Xiahou Dun, Dian Wei, Sun Shang Xiang, Ma Chao and Zhou Yu) and 4 stages available to be played. An English demo would later be released on May 21, 2010, on PSN but had less content than the Japanese demo. There are only four characters playable (Zhao Yun, Xiahou Dun, Dian Wei, and Sun Shang Xiang) and there is only one stage available.

== Reception ==
Reception

Aggregate scores
Aggregator	Score		
Aggregator	PS3	PSP	Xbox 360
GameRankings	66.09%	68.09%	56.69%
Metacritic	64/100	65/100	59/100

Review scores
Publication	Score		
Publication	PS3	PSP	Xbox 360
Destructoid	8.5/10	7.5/10	N/A
Edge	N/A	5/10	N/A
Eurogamer	N/A	7/10	N/A
GamePro	N/A	3/5	N/A
GameRevolution	C+	C−	C+
GameSpot	6.5/10	6.5/10	6.5/10
GameZone	N/A	7/10	6.5/10
IGN	8/10	7/10	8/10
Official Xbox Magazine (US)	N/A	N/A	5.5/10
VideoGamer.com	N/A	7/10	N/A

The game was met with average to mixed reception upon release. GameRankings and Metacritic gave it a score of 68% and 65 out of 100 for the PSP version; 66% and 64 out of 100 for the PlayStation 3 version; and 57% and 59 out of 100 for the Xbox 360 version.

IGN's Sam Bishop would give the handheld version a 7/10, saying " I'm very impressed with it -- at least in comparison to other Dynasty Warriors games. It's far from perfect, thanks to the muddy visuals, troublesome lock-on and single-player difficulty, but it's definitely a step in the right direction for the developer. The multiplayer functionality, mixed in with the tougher, fast-paced combat gives Strikeforce a serious edge over its predecessors."

GameZone's Dakota Grabowski gave the Xbox 360 version a 6.5/10, saying, "The changes are a blessing to both naysayers and fans alike. If the team can move towards more entertaining elements, then the Dynasty Warriors may end up in the spotlight with critical praise."
