= Dynasty Warriors Advance =

2005 video game

- North American Game Boy Advance cover art
- Developer: Omega Force
- Publishers: JP: Koei; WW: Nintendo
- Series: Dynasty Warriors
- Platform: Game Boy Advance
- Release: JP: March 24, 2005; NA: August 29, 2005; EU: December 2, 2005
- Genres: Hack and slash Tactical action
- Mode: Single Player

Dynasty Warriors Advance (真・三國無双 Advance, Shin Sangoku Musō Adobansu; Shin Sangokumusou Advance in Japan) is a 2005 hack and slash video game developed by Omega Force and published by Koei for the Game Boy Advance. A spin-off of the Dynasty Warriors series, it was published outside Japan by Nintendo. It is the only installment in the series to be released for the Game Boy Advance as well as the first to not be released on a PlayStation console.

== Characters ==
Dynasty Warriors Advance features a smaller roster of thirteen characters, a sharp decrease in comparison to the last home console title, Dynasty Warriors 5. Three members of each faction are available from the beginning of the game. Completing Musou Mode with any character from a particular faction will unlock the faction's leader as a playable character. Completing Musou Mode again with one of the faction leaders will unlock Lu Bu.

Wei	Wu	Shu	Other
Xiahou Dun	Sun Ce	Zhao Yun	Lu Bu (Unlockable)
Xu Zhu	Sun Shang Xiang	Guan Yu	
Zhen Ji	Zhou Yu	Zhang Fei	
Cao Cao (Unlockable)	Sun Jian (Unlockable)	Liu Bei (Unlockable)	

== Reception ==
Reception

Aggregate scores
Aggregator	Score
GameRankings	54.83%
Metacritic	56/100

Review scores
Publication	Score
Eurogamer	3/10
Game Informer	7/10
GamePro	3.5/5
GameSpot	5.3/10
GameSpy	1.5/5
GameZone	6.9/10
IGN	4/10
Nintendo Power	7/10
Nintendo World Report	5/10
X-Play	3/5
Detroit Free Press	3/4
The Sydney Morning Herald	3/5

Dynasty Warriors Advance received very mixed reviews upon release. IGN disliked the game, grading it 4 out of 10, criticizing the low number of on-screen enemies at any time, and the "button-mashing" gameplay. Nintendo Power, however, gave the game a 7 (out of 10), praising its replay value that "ranks among the best" on the Game Boy Advance system. The game currently has a score of 56 out of 100 at Metacritic, and 55% at GameRankings.
