= Musou Orochi Z =

2009 video game

Warriors Orochi Z
- Developer: Omega Force
- Publisher: Koei
- Series: Dynasty Warriors; Samurai Warriors; Warriors Orochi
- Platforms: PlayStation 3, Microsoft Windows
- Release: PlayStation 3: JP: March 12, 2009; Microsoft Windows: JP: November 27, 2009
- Genre: Hack and slash
- Modes: Single-player, multiplayer

Warriors Orochi Z (無双OROCHI Z, Musō Orochi Zetto) is a 2009 hack and slash video game developed by Koei and Omega Force for the PlayStation 3 and Microsoft Windows. Z is the third installment of the Warriors Orochi series, a crossover video game of the Dynasty Warriors and Samurai Warriors series. Musou Orochi Z was intended to be a combination of the first two games with more characters and stages on an updated gaming platform. The game was released in Japan for the PS3 on March 12, 2009, and released for the Windows on November 27. Koei had planned to release the game as Warriors Orochi Z in North America and Europe, but those plans have since been cancelled.

== Gameplay ==
As Musou Orochi Z is a combination of the first two games, the gameplay follows the standard set by the first Orochi; the player selects three characters and uses them in one stage. Certain aspects of the gameplay have been changed. For the first time, the second player can choose their own separate team of three characters, unlike the previous two games where both players are forced to use the same characters.

Dream Mode too has been changed; 12 stages have been added, giving a total of 40 Dream mode stages. Unlike Warriors Orochi 2, characters outside the Three Kingdoms and Sengoku periods are included as well. These are also included in the Western release of Warriors Orochi 2 on the PlayStation Portable, as this game is not being released in Europe or North America.

Team	Stage
San Zang, Zhang He, Magoichi Saika	Tian Shui
Kaiba, Da Ji, Himiko	He Fei
Kiyomori Taira, Yoshitsune Minamoto, Benkei	Sekigahara
Sun Wukong, San Zang, Himiko	Nan Zhong
Da Ji, Dodomekki, Gyuki	Wuzhang Mountains
San Zang, Pang Tong, Toshiie Maeda	Anegawa
Masamune Date, Benkei, Himiko	Mikatagahara
Da Ji, Xing Cai, Gracia	Shizugatake
Nene, Hanzo Hattori, Kotaro Fuma	Edo Castle
Taigong Wang, Fu Xi, Nu Wa	Chi Bi
Orochi, Masamune Date, Keiji Maeda	Bai Di Castle
Orochi X, Da Ji, Kiyomori Taira	Koshi Castle

== Characters ==
In addition to the 92 characters from the first two Orochi games returning, two newcomers make their first appearance in the game as well:

- Benkei (弁慶) was a warrior monk of the Heian period, most famously known for his loyalty to Minamoto no Yoshitsune, and his collection of weapons. He wields a giant glove as his weapon and is under the "PWR" category.
- San Zang (三藏法師, Sanzō Hōshi) is the central character of the classic Chinese epic Journey to the West, where Sun Wukong also originated from. In a break of traditional portrayals, Sanzang in Warriors Orochi Z is portrayed as a female. Her weapons are her sleeves, based on Chinese traditional Ribbon Dancing, and is under the "SPD" category.

Additionally, Dodomekki and Gyuki, two Orochi army generals that were only playable in the VS and Survival mode of Warriors Orochi 2, have been made into fully fledged characters that can be used throughout the entire game, complete with updated and improved movesets.

With the addition of four characters, a total of 96 characters encompass the roster of Warriors Orochi Z.

The game also adds an unlockable fourth costume in addition to the already available three. These costumes can be unlocked by reaching Proficiency level 20. The Dynasty Warriors characters mainly get their Dynasty Warriors 6 costumes, while the Samurai Warriors characters are getting their alternate costume from Samurai Warriors or Samurai Warriors 2: Xtreme Legends. Characters who were cut from these titles or exclusive for the Warriors Orochi series have new costumes entirely.
