= DW1 =

DW1 may refer to:

- Digimon World
- Dragon Warrior
- Dynasty Warriors (1997 video game)
