= DW5 =

DW5 may refer to:

- Dragon Quest V: Hand of the Heavenly Bride
- Dynasty Warriors 5
