= Dynasty Warriors: Origins =

2025 video game

- Developer: Omega Force
- Publisher: Koei Tecmo
- Directors: Kazutoshi Sekiguchi; Mitsuhiro Oshima
- Producer: Tomohiko Sho
- Designer: Michio Yamada
- Programmer: Tomohisa Yoshikawa
- Artist: Shunya Yoshida
- Writer: Mari Okamoto
- Composer: Masato Koike
- Series: Dynasty Warriors
- Engine: Katana Engine
- Platforms: PlayStation 5; Windows; Xbox Series X/S; Nintendo Switch 2
- Release: PlayStation 5, Windows, Xbox Series X/S; January 17, 2025 (Note: The Deluxe edition was released on January 14, 2025.); Switch 2 January 22, 2026
- Genre: Hack and slash
- Mode: Single-player

Dynasty Warriors: Origins (Note: Known in Japan as Shin Sangokumusou: Origins (真・三國無双ORIGINS, Shin Sangokumusō Orijinsu)) is a 2025 hack and slash game developed by Omega Force and published by Koei Tecmo. The tenth installment in the Dynasty Warriors series, it was released for PlayStation 5, Windows and Xbox Series X/S on January 17, 2025. Upon release, it received generally positive reviews from critics and sold 1 million units by February. It was released on Nintendo Switch 2 on January 22, 2026.

== Plot ==
Like other entries in the Dynasty Warriors series, Dynasty Warriors: Origins is based on the Chinese novel Romance of the Three Kingdoms. According to Producer Tomohiko Sho, however, Origins differs from previous titles in that it only covers the first half of the novel while being more thorough in telling the story, which in turn is responsible for the new naming scheme.

Unlike other entries, the game entirely focuses on an alternate history narrative in which the protagonist Ziluan, an amnesiac wanderer who only knows he must find a hero who will unite China, plays a decisive role throughout the events of the novel, such as personally defeating the Yellow Turban leader Zhang Jiao, killing several of the Ten Eunuchs, and assisting Wang Yun in the assassination plot against Dong Zhuo. Involved in this story is a youthful healer named Yuanhua who uses incense to help Ziluan recover his memories and three enigmatic figures from his past who respectively assist, advise, and oppose his journey.

The game also features a branching storyline in which the player identifies Liu Bei, Cao Cao, or Sun Jian (later Sun Ce and Sun Quan) as the hero Ziluan is seeking, with the choice determining the faction Ziluan joins, battles which may be played, and characters Ziluan may form bonds with and have assist him in battle. Each branch is further split into two endings, one which loosely adheres to the classic Romance of the Three Kingdoms plot up to the immediate aftermath of the Battle of Red Cliffs, and the other requiring the player complete difficult additional objectives to change the outcome of a battle or avert the death of a historical figure which yields a more favorable position for the player's chosen faction into the following era.

== Gameplay ==
Gameplay consists of both hack-and slash and strategic elements; the player controls a main character but can also issue commands to troops on the battlefield. Aside from the main character, players can select another general as a teammate. Multiple weapons and other character customizations are available.

The game incorporates both the traditional charge-based combo system from earlier Dynasty Warriors games, and a new "Battle Arts" skill system. Defensive options includes a dodge-and-parry system.

Unlike in previous Dynasty Warriors games where all weapons have similar combo tree, weapons in Origins have their own gimmicks and unique combo tree. For example, gauntlets uses a stance system that changes the user's normal attacks depending on the strong attack used, while Podao allows the user to weave normal attacks with powerful level-based charge attacks. Raising a weapon's proficiency expands Ziluan's combo tree and unlocks Battle Arts for that weapon.

Ziluan can switch with his companion when their Musou gauge is full. Companions are much more powerful than Ziluan and can immediately enter War God Rage mode, but they can only be controlled for a limited time, and performing a Musou or True Musou attack will immediately dismiss them.

The "Tactics" system, reminiscent of the stratagems in the Empires sub-series, allows Ziluan to deploy a certain number of his personal troops to perform various attacks that aid him in battle, such as firing a volley of arrows in a wide area. This overlaps with the new "Eyes of the Sacred Bird" ability, which grants bird-eye view of the battlefield and reveals stage gimmicks that might not be visible normally.

Origins uses an overworld map where Ziluan can engage in various activities in the overworld, such as participating in skirmishes, visiting towns to purchase items and weapons, finding collectibles, and spending time with select officers they've met in the main story.

Forming and strengthening bonds with officers by interacting with them in towns and accepting their requests will allow Ziluan to learn more about them, and they will also give him items as gratitude.

== Development ==
Dynasty Warriors: Origins is the first addition to the series in seven years that is not a mobile game. It was developed to take advantage of PlayStation 5 hardware. Development of a numbered sequel in the franchise, which would have been called Dynasty Warriors 10, was halted following the release of the PlayStation 5 in 2020 in order to redirect resources to Origins. Sho considered this move to be necessary in order to reinvent the series; Dynasty Warriors 10 would have been similar to previous games, which he believed fans were "starting to get a bit bored of". Omega Force set a goal of displaying 10,000 soldiers on the screen. According to an interview with Push Square, Sho reportedly practiced martial arts as part of development for the game.

On August 3, 2025, in relation to the Dynasty Warriors 25th anniversary event, a major DLC was announced to be in development. The DLC, titled "Visions of Four Heroes", was released on January 22, 2026.

== Reception ==
Reception

Aggregate scores
Aggregator	Score
Metacritic	(PC) 84/100 (PS5) 79/100 (XSXS) 79/100
OpenCritic	85% recommend

Review scores
Publication	Score
Destructoid	9.5/10
Digital Trends	3/5
Famitsu	(9,10,10,9)/40
GameSpot	7/10
GamesRadar+	4/5
Hardcore Gamer	4/5
IGN	9/10
PC Gamer (US)	75/100
PCGamesN	8/10
Push Square	8/10
RPGamer	4/5
RPGFan	93/100
Shacknews	7/10
TechRadar	4/5
Video Games Chronicle	3/5
VG247	5/5
VideoGamer.com	6/10

Dynasty Warriors: Origins received "generally favorable" reviews, according to review aggregator website Metacritic. OpenCritic determined that 85% of critics recommended the game.

CGMagazine praised the game as the best entry in the Musou franchise in years, reclaiming lost goodwill and offering a much-needed overhaul for the series. The game was also commended by IGN for its deep combat mechanics, engaging storyline, improved visuals, and replay value, successfully balancing story and combat to offer a fresh take on familiar characters and stories.

VideoGamer described it as a middle-of-the-road experience that lacks depth and feels stuck in the past.

=== Sales ===
In Japan, Dynasty Warriors: Origins sold 63,805 physical units on the PlayStation 5 during its first week of release, making it the second best-selling game in the country behind Donkey Kong Country Returns HD. The game had sold 94,583 physical units in Japan on the PS5 by February 9, 2025. Koei Tecmo announced on February 14, 2025 that it had sold 1 million units worldwide.

=== Awards ===
Year	Award	Category	Result	Ref.
2025	Japan Game Awards	Award for Excellence	Won	
