= Dynasty Warriors DS: Fighter's Battle =

2007 video game

- Developer: Studiofake
- Publisher: Koei
- Director: Keiji Okayasu
- Series: Dynasty Warriors
- Platform: Nintendo DS
- Release: JP: April 5, 2007; NA: July 24, 2007; AU: August 30, 2007; EU: August 31, 2007
- Genre: Tactical action
- Modes: Single-player, multiplayer

Dynasty Warriors DS: Fighter's Battle (真・三國無双DSファイターズバトル, Shin Sangokumusō Dī Esu Faitāzu Batoru; Shin Sangokumusou DS Fighter's Battle in Japan) is a hack and slash video game developed by Studiofake and published by Koei for the Nintendo DS. It is a spin-off of the Dynasty Warriors series and the first not to be developed by Omega Force; Studiofake, a studio uncredited for its services save for director Kenji Okayasu leads development.

The game is set in ancient China. The player can choose a warrior out of Suzaku/Phoenix (朱雀), Seiryuu/Dragon (青龍) and Genbu/Chimera (玄武).

== Gameplay ==
The game features a "Warrior Cards" system with 120 cards. In battles, the cards are used to summon the warriors of the Dynasty Warriors series to assist the player in battles. Decks can be formed by the players. However the number of cards a player can equip is only as much as the number of player's defense points, ration stores and weapon stores in the map.

Cards are classified using the colors blue, red, yellow, green or pink (rare). Blue cards provide a skill for the player to use in battle, whereas red cards provide enhancements of player's attack rating, defense rating or health points (HP). Yellow cards provide both skills and stat increments. Blue and red cards can be leveled up to a maximum of three stars, while yellow cards have fixed stats.

Players can progress to an adjacent point or into buildings housing the enemy general protecting the defense point required number of defeated officers (shown at the top-right corner) in that particular map. However, if the point contains a defense point, rations store or weapons store owned by the player, movement in and out of the point is unrestricted.

Ration stores and weapon stores are 'neutral' at the start of the battle, and can be claimed by either party. Claiming ownership of a rations store and weapon store increases the size and improves the fighting abilities of the owner's army respectively. Once claimed, an allied warrior in the deck will be summoned to protect the store, which can still be taken over by the opponent.

Also featured in this game is terrains with effects. For example, poisonous puddles reduce the HP of whoever steps on it, frozen grounds causes sliding, rocking ships disrupts normal movement etc.

The game is won when one of the two players break through all the opponent's defense points and defeat the enemy warrior in the main base, which only opens up after opponent loses all defense points.

Voice samples are used sparingly in this game, most of which are said by the player's characters. Some of the generals have voices as well, and all of them have different text for pre-fight and post-fight encounters.

== Reception ==
Reception

Aggregate scores
Aggregator	Score
GameRankings	55.46%
Metacritic	56/100

Review scores
Publication	Score
Electronic Gaming Monthly	5.33/10
Game Informer	6.5/10
GameSpot	4.5/10
GameSpy	3/5
GamesRadar+	2.5/5
GameZone	6.2/10
IGN	5.9/10
Nintendo Power	7.5/10
Official Nintendo Magazine	58%
PALGN	3.5/10

The game was met with very mixed reception upon release; GameRankings gave it a score of 55.46%, while it got 56 out of 100 on Metacritic.
