= Dynasty Warriors Next =

2011 video game

- Developer: Omega Force
- Publisher: Tecmo Koei
- Series: Dynasty Warriors
- Platform: PlayStation Vita
- Release: JP: December 17, 2011; NA/EU: February 22, 2012; AU: February 23, 2012
- Genre: Hack and slash
- Mode: Single-player

Dynasty Warriors Next (Note: Known in Japan as Shin Sangokumusou NEXT (Japanese: 真・三國無双 NEXT, Hepburn: Shin Sangokumusō NEXT)) is a hack and slash video game developed by Omega Force and published by Tecmo Koei for the PlayStation Vita. A spin-off of the Dynasty Warriors series, it was released as a launch title for the console.

== Gameplay ==
Dynasty Warriors Next is split into several scenarios where all stages are chosen from a map of China. The territories can be invaded in order to gain influence and gold for each owned region. The earned gold can be spent on stratagems, which are special boosts represented by the officers of a player's faction. They come with different bonuses: increasing attack and defense, boosting the aggression of the enemy's army, making the bases easier to seize, and others. The army can be equipped with items and weapons that are found on the battlefield, like buffs, enhancements or horses.

Once the battle starts, the map gets split between allied and enemy bases. Each of them have a special purpose, and benefit the side which controls it. A supply will increase the power of all owned bases, and an armory can temporarily double the troops' attack. The lairs can spawn animal reinforcements in bears, tigers or wolves, while the magical bases link themselves to other bases, making them invulnerable. The bases can be captured by killing everything that is inside, until the counter drops to zero. At any point, an unskippable one-on-one duel may initiate. Similar to Infinity Blade, the player can block the attacks while tapping the flashing points to break their resistance, and finish them off.

There are several game modes available. Campaign contains three story acts and is loosely based on Romance of the Three Kingdoms, with the purpose of introducing the basic concepts. It serves as a series of battles, where the rival kingdoms are vying for control of the land. The player usually gets to make a choice of which officer to take in, except for key conflicts where it's all restricted. In the Conquest mode, the main goal of taking over territories across China remains the same, only that it also allows the players to create their own army and officers. Edit Mode is used for creating or editing characters. The customization materials are unlocked by completing the Campaign parts, and every created character can be brought in Conquest afterwards. Conquest has an online version, where the game will collect data from other players to populate the battlefield. The player will then face off against other Edit Mode creations, in addition to the regular cast.

The game makes use of touch and gyroscope Vita controls: tilting for aiming Musou attacks or marking enemies' weak points, and touchscreen for blocking and deflecting projectiles.

== Reception ==
Reception

Aggregate scores
Aggregator	Score
GameRankings	68.31%
Metacritic	67/100

Review scores
Publication	Score
Destructoid	6/10
Eurogamer	7/10
Famitsu	9/10, 9/10, 9/10, 8/10
G4	3/5
Game Informer	6/10
GameSpot	5/10
GamesRadar+	2.5/5
GameTrailers	7.3/10
IGN	8/10
PlayStation Official Magazine – Australia	6/10
PlayStation Official Magazine – UK	6/10
PlayStation: The Official Magazine	5/10

Dynasty Warriors Next was met with average to mixed reception upon release; GameRankings gave it a score of 68.31%, while Metacritic gave it 67 out of 100. The game sold 29,181 copies within its first week of release in Japan.
