= Dynasty Warriors Online =

2006 video game

- Official Logo
- Developer: Omega Force
- Publishers: Koei (2006–2014); Tecmo Koei
- Series: Dynasty Warriors
- Platforms: Microsoft Windows; PlayStation 3 PlayStation 4 PlayStation Vita
- Release: Microsoft Windows: JP: 2006; NA: November 10, 2010; PlayStation 3: JP: February 18, 2010; PlayStation 4: JP: September 18, 2014; PlayStation Vita: JP: November 19, 2015
- Genre: MMOG
- Mode: Multiplayer

Dynasty Warriors Online, known as Shin Sangoku Musou Online (真・三國無双Online, Shin SangokuMusō Online) in Japan, was a massively-multiplayer online game developed by Omega Force and published by Koei (later Tecmo Koei). released for Microsoft Windows in Japan in 2006, and for PlayStation 3 on February 18, 2010. The game belongs to Tecmo Koei's Dynasty Warriors video game series, as well as the larger Romance of the Three Kingdoms meta series, which is based on the Great Classical Novel of the same name.

== Gameplay ==
Dynasty Warriors Online allows players to create their own character and choose a weapon from existing playable characters. Once a character is created, the player enters the world of Dynasty Warriors, defeating opposing armies for experience points. Players can also see other players that they can battle. It also poses the introduction of free roam, of which a player can move around their factions city talking to various non-player characters.

The gameplay of Dynasty Warriors Online is similar to its console counterparts. It composes of two main parts, campaign battles and melee battles. Campaign battles occurs weekly, where the 3 Kingdoms (Wu, Wei, and Shu) and other possible factions (Such as Dong Zhuo or Yuan Shao) fight for cities and territory. If there's no campaign scheduled, then a large 24 player Showdown battle will be held. The goal of the game is to complete the objective specified for the type of battle. In melee, there are five modes:

- Capture – Capture all the enemy bases, or all the bases on the battlefield
- Defeat – Defeat the certain number of troops in the time limit
- Confront – Defeat 10 enemy players
- Search – Bring 10 pieces of treasure back to one of your bases or supply base.
- Destroy – Reduce the enemies force through various means.

== Development ==
The game was originally announced for Microsoft Windows in 2004 as Shin Sangoku Musou BB (Dynasty Warriors Broadband), with a release in Japan in early 2006. In late 2009 a PS3 port was teased through a small Flash site. The PS3 version was later confirmed, with a worldwide release date of February 18, 2010., but was instead brought exclusive only to Japan. In August 2010 it was announced that Aeria Games would be publishing this game for the North America and Europe regions. The game was available as a free download, as is most of Aeria Games' content. The company supported the game via micropayments.

The game's name changed from Dynasty Warriors BB to Dynasty Warriors Online on Wednesday, November 28, 2007.

On July 18, 2013, a massive update was released in the Japanese version of Dynasty Warriors Online, changing the name of Shin Sangoku Musou Online to Shin Sangoku Musou Online Z. This update adds the new feature of "Weapon Swapping" similar to Dynasty Warriors 7. Characters and soldiers have been remodeled with their Dynasty Warriors 7 appearances (Except for some characters like Zuo Ci who have their Dynasty Warriors 8 appearance). The intro of the game has been changed, featuring the same three characters from the first in a revised state.

As of 1 January 2014 @ 5:00 PM PST the English version hosted by Aeria Games has shut down.

The Japanese version has shut down as of 24 February 2022.
