= Dynasty Warriors: Godseekers =

Tactical role-playing game

- Developer: Omega Force
- Publisher: Koei Tecmo
- Series: Dynasty Warriors
- Platforms: PlayStation Vita, PlayStation 4, PlayStation 3
- Release: JP: August 3, 2016; NA: January 31, 2017; EU: February 1, 2017
- Genre: Tactical role-playing
- Mode: Single-player

Dynasty Warriors: Godseekers (Note: Known in Japan as Shin Sangokumusou Eiketsuden (Japanese: 真・三國無双 英傑伝, Hepburn: Shin Sangokumusō Eiketsuden)) is a tactical role-playing game developed by Omega Force and published by Koei Tecmo. The game is a spinoff to the Dynasty Warriors series of video games that focuses less on action, and more strategy, similar to prior spinoff Dynasty Tactics. The game was released on the PlayStation Vita and PlayStation 4 video game consoles in the West, with a PlayStation 3 port existing only in Japan.

== Gameplay ==
Dynasty Warriors: Godseekers, unlike the mainline Dynasty Warriors games, is a turn-based strategy game with no hack and slash combat. (Compare to the standalone Empires games, which are turn-based strategy games that use the traditional hack and slash combat to resolve conflict.) Players control a team of up to five characters as they move across a grid, and attack enemy units in order to achieve some form of objective. Most maps are based on maps found in Dynasty Warriors 8: Empires, with alterations to limit the size of the level and better fit the grid pattern.

Each character has six separate stats that determine their abilities in combat: attack, defense, dexterity (higher dexterity increase the odds of hitting enemies in attacks), agility (higher agility increase the odds of evading enemy attacks), spirit (attack power gains a bonus when fighting low-morale enemies), and mobility (governs number of spaces that a character may move per turn). All characters are divided into one of five types, which largely determine their dominant stat and special ability:

- Attack type characters have the highest stat in attack, which may grow further the more damage they take.
- Defense type characters have the highest stat in defense, and they take reduced damage if they are attacked from the front or sides. They do not, however, take reduced damage from ranged attacks.
- Technique type characters are dominant in dexterity, and their attacks have a greater chance of inflicting critical hits, which increase their damage output.
- Speed type characters are dominant in agility, and they may ignore enemy zones of control – normally, each character projects a zone of control in the four spaces around them, restricting enemy movement.
- Spirit type characters are dominant in spirit, and they regenerate health at the start of each turn.

Each character may make use of attacks to eliminate enemies from the map: each character may have up to four regular attacks (charge attacks from the main series games) among them being two EX attacks (selected charge attacks from the main series games which have an additional follow-up attack there), as well as three musou attacks. All attacks cost a specified amount of energy to use: each character begins the game with eight energy points, and may expend anywhere between one and five energy points to use an attack. All characters will regain three energy points at the start of each turn. A character may make as many attacks as their energy points allow, and may attack in multiple different directions in the same turn. All attacks gradually charge a player's Musou gauge, and a stock of Musou gauge is required in order to perform a Musou attack in addition to any energy costs. Attacks also gradually fill up a Synchro Gauge, and, if characters are positioned in a prescribed fashion while the Synchro Gauge is full, they may perform a Synchro Attack, expending the Synchro Gauge and allowing all participants to move and attack again that turn, as well as replenish their energy points and deal devastating damage to distant opponents. It is possible to have Synchro Attacks themselves refill the Synchro Gauge, and have multiple Synchro Attacks occur in a single turn.

Characters gain experience and skill points after defeating enemies. Skill points may be invested in various skills according to the character's skill board, while experience is used to level up characters and unlock new attacks for characters to use. Characters gain more experience by defeating higher-levelled enemies, and the amount of experience gained is relative to the character's current level as well as the level defeated by enemies. Synchro Attacks will award experience and skill points to all characters involved, not just the character initiating the Synchro Attack. Defeated enemies will sometimes earn the player gold, which allows players to buy better weapons or equipment for their characters, treasure chests, which contain one weapon suitable for one character the player has unlocked, or items which may be consumed in battle.

The selection of characters in a given level may be influenced by the current storyline situation: for example, a selection of Cao Cao's forces may be used in battles immediately prior to the level depicting the Battle of Xiapi, but once that battle has concluded, they will no longer be available for use. Some levels may also require the use of certain characters – most notably, series protagonist Zhao Yun must be used in almost all storyline levels. Characters may be unlocked on a more permanent basis generally by completing objectives in their Path of Destiny, which is a series of four (six for Zhao Yun and Lei Bin) support conversations for each character which are unlocked by gradually completing requirements over the course of the game. The Path of Destiny for a particular character is first revealed when they encounter the character for the first time as either ally or enemy, and the unlocking of characters may lie anywhere on their Path of Destiny. (As a general rule, the earliest point in which a character may be unlocked permanently is the point in which they cease to be relevant to the main story.)

== Story ==
The game takes place in the Three Kingdoms era of China, and features many of the characters from past Dynasty Warriors games, specifically as depicted in Dynasty Warriors 8: Empires. The main story revolves around series protagonist Zhao Yun (Masaya Onosaka) and two original characters:

- Lei Bin (雷斌), courtesy name Shibo (師伯) (Makoto Furukawa) is Zhao Yun's childhood friend from Changshan. He is a history buff, and an enthusiast of legends from the time of the Yellow Emperor. His weapon of choice is a bowgun, a reworked version of Lianshi's crossbow from Dynasty Warriors 8 to suit a male character (Lianshi switched to the mandarin duck hooks in Dynasty Warriors 8: Empires.)
- Lixia (黎霞) (Minami Tsuda) is a mystic who Zhao Yun and Lei Bin unseal while driving away Yellow Turban bandits from a shrine near their home. She can access her powers through the use of five orbs, one each for the five classical elements of Chinese philosophy. She is not a playable character, but her abilities to subtly influence those around her forms the in-game justification of the game mechanics.

As with all Dynasty Warriors games, the game's story is a loose retelling of Romance of the Three Kingdoms, but with a specific focus on the life and times of Zhao Yun in this game, with the story in Dynasty Warriors: Godseekers ending around the time of the formation of the Kingdom of Shu. Characters from Dynasty Warriors 8 that are not involved in this era (such as most of the characters from the Kingdom of Jin) are absent in the game.

Shortly after the Yellow Turban Rebellion, Zhao Yun and Lei Bin discover a mysterious figure encased in ice in a cavernous shrine under attack by Yellow Turban bandits. They unwittingly unseal the figure inside, who reveals herself to be Lixia, an ancient mystic responsible for the defeat of the demon Chiyou during the time of the Yellow Emperor. However, the defeat of the demon had scattered the five orbs holding her power across the land, and the Yellow Emperor had, for reasons unknown, sealed her in ice. Lixia presses the two men to find her five orbs, in order to gain an idea as to how to return Lixia home to the mystic realm.

Lixia has the ability to sense the presence of nearby orbs, but only if other orbs are not nearby. Their first clue lies in Luoyang, where a coalition led by Yuan Shao is leading a charge to unseat the warlord Dong Zhuo from power. After having defeated Dong Zhuo's forces in the Battle of Hulao Gate, Dong Zhuo begins to retreat, relocating its treasures west to Chang'an. However, one of the orbs, the Fire orb, escapes from his grasp, and, in trying to retrieve it, he accidentally activates its power, setting the city in flames. Having recovered the Fire orb, they set out to find the second orb, located within Xu Province. There, Cao Cao's forces had recently engaged in a battle against local governor Tao Qian over the death of Cao Cao's father. Having been enamored with Liu Bei and his sworn brothers, Guan Yu and Zhang Fei, during the battle of Hulao Gate, they assist in Tao Qian's retreat, but not before discovering that Cao Cao has secured the Water orb for himself.

With Cao Cao being in close proximity, Zhao Yun and company head south to Sun Jian's domain, having heard rumours that he had recovered a valuable artifact from Luoyang during its destruction. When asked, Sun Jian says that he had not, in fact recovered one of Lixia's orbs, but instead the Imperial Seal, the symbol of the Emperor of China, and that he is merely biding his opportunity to return the seal to the Emperor when the time is right. In the meantime, he asks for Zhao Yun to help control the impulsiveness of his son, Sun Ce. However, their time with Sun Jian is cut short, as he is killed while trying to take Xiangyang. A despondent Sun Ce orders retreat, and, after needing some time to reflect and mourn over his father's death, dismisses Zhao Yun from his service.

Upon hearing another set of rumours, the group heads for Lü Bu's forces, presently stationed in Dingtao. Lü Bu is willing to give Lixia the Earth orb that he had recovered, but is persuaded otherwise by his advisor, Chen Gong, who has designs on using it in a future battle against Cao Cao's forces. However, the battle goes disastrously for them: when Chen Gong tries to use the orb's powers, it causes an earthquake which causes the orb to slip from Chen Gong's hands and into Cao Cao's. The loss of the orb causes Lü Bu's forces to retreat. With no further leads on orbs due to Cao Cao being nearby, Zhao Yun decides to head back to Xu Province and see how Liu Bei is doing, with Lü Bu's forces deciding to follow them. Liu Bei welcomes Zhao Yun with open arms, but while the two are away from Xu Province, Lü Bu's forces betray Liu Bei, taking control of the province from him. Desperate for assistance, Liu Bei eventually turns to Cao Cao for help.

With Zhao Yun working for Cao Cao, Lixia takes the opportunity to demand the return of the Water and Earth orbs from Cao Cao, only for Cao Cao to refuse. He does agree, however, to return the orbs only after he has completed his ambition of reuniting the land. In order to demonstrate to Lixia that he, unlike Dong Zhuo and Chen Gong before, is worthy of wielding the orbs' power, he proceeds to use the power of the two orbs to flood Lü Bu's base of operations, and in the ensuing Battle of Xiapi, Lü Bu is captured and summarily executed. Cao Cao and Liu Bei part ways then, but Zhao Yun's request to enter Liu Bei's service is turned down, with Liu Bei claiming that Zhao Yun needs to see the world before committing to a master to serve.

On Liu Bei's advice, the group returns to Sun Ce, who reveals that, as a result of trading away the Imperial Seal for some troops for his conquest of Jiangdong, Sun Ce had acquired the Wood orb, with the power to manipulate the winds. He fully intends to have his friend Zhou Yu use the Wood orb to exact revenge on Huang Zu, the officer who had killed his father, but promises to Lixia that he will return the orb to her once that has been accomplished. They go far in making their way to Huang Zu's stronghold, but when word arrives that Liu Bei, who had fled north to Yuan Shao's domain in Guandu, is in trouble, Zhao Yun apologizes to Sun Ce and rushes to Liu Bei's aid. When they reach Guandu, they find Liu Bei and Zhang Fei safe, but Guan Yu was nowhere to be found, having used himself as a decoy to ensure the others' safety. However, Guan Yu had not gone very far, as the deaths of Wen Chou and Yan Liang had risen suspicions that Guan Yu was serving in Cao Cao's front lines. The group decides to find and retrieve Guan Yu, and once found, flee from battle in safety. Lei Bin and Zhang Fei eventually find Guan Yu at a depot in Wuchao, and in order to provide a signal to Liu Bei and Zhao Yun that they may proceed to rendezvous, use the power of Lixia's Fire orb to create a signal, inadvertently setting the supply depot on fire. Although impeded by both Cao Cao's forces and Yuan Shao's forces, a fortuitous earthquake allows the group to escape, and the loss of the Wuchao depot would ultimately secure Cao Cao's victory in the Battle of Guandu.

Finally reunited with Guan Yu, he reveals that Cao Cao had given Guan Yu the Earth orb to try and get him to defect, but instead Guan Yu returns the orb to Lixia. Now with Zhao Yun having entered Liu Bei's service, the group heads south to Xinye, where they have some temporary lodgings, only to find Cao Cao's main force in pursuit. Though the advice of a local volunteer named Xu Shu, they manage to evade Cao Cao's forces, but Xu Shu would not commit to staying with Liu Bei long-term; instead he refers them to Zhuge Liang, a recluse who can be more of a help to Liu Bei and his goals. Zhuge Liang agrees to enter Liu Bei's service, and is surprisingly aware of Lixia and her powers; he quickly demonstrates his knowledge by making use of Lixia strategically in the Battle of Bowangpo to gain a quick victory over Cao Cao's forces. However, when Cao Cao's forces press on, the group decides to evacuate the population, and in the ensuing Battle of Changban, Zhao Yun ends up having to rescue Liu Bei's wife and infant son. Zhuge Liang intends to seek assistance from Sun Quan's forces in order to defeat Cao Cao decisively, as part of his Longzhong Plan.

Upon reaching Sun Quan's forces, Sun Quan reveals that, shortly after Zhao Yun had left to aid Liu Bei in Guandu, Sun Ce was assassinated, with Sun Quan finishing the promises made by his departed brother. With the promises fulfilled, he returns the Wood orb to Lixia, but asks her to use the three orbs in her possession in the upcoming Battle of Chibi. The battle is a success, and Cao Cao's fleet is wiped out. Although Cao Cao attempts to make his escape, he is stopped by Guan Yu, who only allows Cao Cao to leave if he surrenders the Water orb. During all of this, Lixia is amazed how the powers of her orbs may be used together, but Lei Bin is more concerned: each time Lixia takes back her orbs, he senses a growing sense of doom, and wonders if at any point the powers of all five orbs will be used against them.

As Liu Bei set to eke out an empire in the west, Lei Bin begins acting cold and distant towards Liu Bei's forces and Lixia in particular, the quest to find the fifth and final orb becoming a greater and greater obsession. Indeed, Lixia also senses that the fifth orb lies in Chengdu, but as they approach it, Lixia also feels the same unsettling feeling coming over her. Just as Liu Bei's forces capture Chengdu, Lei Bin reappears with the fifth orb, having found it in Chengdu. He intends to use the Metal orb and its power of turning living objects into statues to terminate Lixia. Zhao Yun is forced to fight his friend, and although he defeats him, when Lixia claims the Metal orb for herself, she suddenly begins screaming out of control, as the dark presence completely overwhelms Lixia. As Lei Bin had feared, by collecting all five of the orbs, the demon Chiyou was resurrected, and had taken control of Lixia. Zhao Yun realizes all too late what has happened, and proceeds to fight Chiyou and her force of reanimated statues, some taken from the essence of warriors Lixia had previously encountered, alone. Lei Bin had, during the time away from the group, discovered that when Lixia had defeated Chiyou, Chiyou had scattered his body amongst the five orbs, and planted his heart within Lixia, thus allowing his resurrection when Lixia had claimed all five of the orbs; this was the reason that Lixia had been sealed by the Yellow Emperor, who was ultimately unable to separate Chiyou from Lixia, and the reason why Lei Bin wanted to terminate Lixia.

Although Zhao Yun and Lei Bin fight valiantly, Lixia manages to briefly break free from Chiyou's possession to tell them that in order to defeat Chiyou, she will need to sacrifice herself; otherwise, Chiyou may become unstoppable. Using whatever powers she still has control of, she creates a new world where Chiyou, and thus herself, never existed, yet preserving the ambitions and aspirations of all who had met her along the way. When it is all done, Zhao Yun and Lei Bin awaken in Chengdu, having only recalled that Liu Bei had taken control of Yi Province, and that they were vaguely aware of being saved from disaster.

== Development ==
The game was first announced in April 2016, under its Japanese name Dynasty Warriors: Eiketsuden. Development had started in 2015, and was 70% complete as of the game's announcement. The game was created out of developer Omega Force's desire to create a game of a different genre than the action-based musou games of the Dynasty Warriors series, something that hadn't been done since the early 2000s Dynasty Tactics games. The game was released in Japan in August 2016 for the PlayStation Vita, PlayStation 4, and PlayStation 3 video game consoles. In November 2016, it was announced that the game would be released in English regions as well, albeit only on the Vita and PS4 platforms. The game is scheduled for release in North America on January 31, 2017, and in Europe on February 1, 2017.

== Reception ==
Reception

Aggregate score
Aggregator	Score
Metacritic	PS4: 70/100; Vita: 62/100

Review scores
Publication	Score
4Players	67%
Destructoid	5.5/10
GameSpot	5/10
Hardcore Gamer	3.5/5
Jeuxvideo.com	13/20

In the game's first week of sales, it was the fifteenth best-selling game in Japan, it sold 6,084 copies of the PlayStation 4 release of the game. PlayStation 3 and Vita sales were not released due to not charting in the top 20.

In addition to its initial Japanese sales performance, Dynasty Warriors: Godseekers received mixed reviews from critics. On the review aggregator site Metacritic, the game holds an overall 'mixed or average' critic score across platforms, with a Metascore around 70 and an average user score of approximately 6.6/10, indicating a divided reception from both reviewers and players.

Critics generally praised the game's attempt to shift the traditional Dynasty Warriors formula into a tactical, turn-based format, appreciating the accessibility of its grid-based combat and the bonus of character progression systems. However, many reviews also noted that while the strategic elements were a fresh change, the game lacked deeper tactical complexity and sometimes suffered from repetitive gameplay, a slowed pace compared to other strategy RPGs, and an underwhelming story presentation.

Overall, Godseekers was seen as a competent but not standout title within both the Dynasty Warriors series and the broader tactical RPG genre, appealing mainly to franchise fans or players interested in a lighter strategy experience rather than hardcore SRPG enthusiasts.
