= Dynasty Warriors 2 =

2000 video game

- North American cover art
- Developer: Omega Force
- Publishers: WW: Koei; EU: Midas Interactive Entertainment
- Director: Akihiro Suzuki
- Designer: Kenichi Ogasawara
- Series: Dynasty Warriors
- Platform: PlayStation 2
- Release: JP: August 3, 2000; NA: October 26, 2000; EU: November 24, 2000
- Genre: Hack and slash
- Mode: Single-player

Dynasty Warriors 2 (Note: Japanese: 真・三國無双, Hepburn: Shin Sangokumusō; lit. 'True Three Kingdoms Unrivaled') (Note: The Japanese numbering for the Dynasty Warriors series games differ from the English translations, which start counting the titles from the 1997 fighting game Dynasty Warriors. The original Japanese release of the series' second title added the Japanese prefix true/genuine (真, shin) and was named Shin Sangokumusō (真・三國無双). The English translation simply numbered it as Dynasty Warriors 2, and the main titles in the series afterward followed suit.) is a 2000 hack and slash game developed by Omega Force and published by Koei for the PlayStation 2. It was released outside Japan as a launch title for the console. It is the second game in the Dynasty Warriors series, but the first in the Shin Sangokumusō series.

The game was released in other countries as Dynasty Warriors 2, leading to the assumption that it is a sequel to the original Dynasty Warriors. The entire series was influenced by the game's success, with all future installments following the game's gameplay style. It was released on the PlayStation Network in 2012.

== Gameplay ==
From this game onward, the player chooses a playable character general, and plays through a number of levels representing particular conflicts in the time of the Three Kingdoms, eventually defeating both of the other kingdoms and becoming the ruler of a unified China. Unlike the one-on-one fighting style of the original Dynasty Warriors, the game is a beat 'em up hack and slash fighting game in full 3D, similar in genre to Fighting Force. Unlike previous games in the beat 'em up genre, Dynasty Warriors 2 allows players the freedom to roam to any point within the limits of the current stage being played.

This game was the first to introduce Free Mode and Musou Mode to the series. Free Mode allows the player to replay any missions that they have already completed in Musou Mode. Musou Mode is the character's main story, where you play as the officer until the kingdom you are fighting for has unified China. However, due to the small scale of the game at the time, many important battles were missing. Some of the missing battles were added in Dynasty Warriors 3.

== Characters ==
There are a total of 28 characters.

Shu	Wei	Wu	Other
**Guan Yu**	Cao Cao	Gan Ning*	Diao Chan
Huang Zhong*	Zhang Liao*	Lu Meng*	Dong Zhuo*
Jiang Wei*	**Dian Wei**	**Lu Xun**	Lu Bu
Liu Bei*	Sima Yi*	Sun Jian*	Yuan Shao*
Ma Chao*	**Xiahou Dun**	Sun Quan*	Zhang Jiao*
**Zhang Fei**	Xiahou Yuan*	**Sun Shang Xiang**	
**Zhao Yun**	**Xu Zhu**	Taishi Ci	
Zhuge Liang		**Zhou Yu**	

* Denotes new characters to the series
Bold denotes default characters

== Stages ==
Many of the stages are recreations of notable battles from history or from the novel Romance of the Three Kingdoms, while original creations became more common with the newer instalments. This is a list of stages in Dynasty Warriors 2.

Year	Stage
184	The Yellow Turban Rebellion
191	Battle of Hu Lao Gate
200	Battle of Guan Du
208	Battle of Chang Ban
208	Battle of Chi Bi
215	Battle of He Fei
222	Battle of Yi Ling
234	Battle of Wu Zhang Plains

== Reception ==
Reception

Aggregate score
Aggregator	Score
Metacritic	75/100

Review scores
Publication	Score
AllGame	3.5/5
CNET Gamecenter	7/10
Electronic Gaming Monthly	6.67/10 (Note: Three critics of Electronic Gaming Monthly gave the game each a score of 7.5/10, 6.5/10, and 6/10.)
Eurogamer	6/10
Famitsu	31/40
Game Informer	8/10
GameFan	(J.W.) 89% 75% (Note: In GameFan's viewpoint of the game, three critics gave it each a score of 70, 72, and 83.)
GamePro	4.5/5
GameRevolution	B−
GameSpot	7.8/10
GameSpy	80%
IGN	7.9/10
Next Generation	3/5
Official U.S. PlayStation Magazine	4/5

The game received "generally favorable reviews" according to the review aggregation website Metacritic. Daniel Erickson of NextGen said of the game, "While it is the first third-person, 3D action game to feature a real-time battlefield, the gameplay is strictly old-school. Fun but not terribly deep." In Japan, Famitsu gave it a score of 31 out of 40.

The game sold 300,000 units in its first six weeks of release in Japan.
