= Dynasty Warriors (1997 video game) =

1997 video game

- North American cover art
- Developer: Omega Force
- Publisher: Koei
- Series: Dynasty Warriors
- Platform: PlayStation
- Release: JP: February 28, 1997; NA: June 27, 1997; PAL: December 1998
- Genre: Fighting
- Modes: Single-player, multiplayer

Dynasty Warriors (Note: Sangokumusō (Japanese: 三國無双)) is a 1997 video game developed by Omega Force and published by Koei for the PlayStation. It is a "one-on-one" fighting game, preceding the hack and slash format of later games in the series.

Contemporary gaming journalists noted Dynasty Warriors for being a startling departure from the strategy games that Koei was known for. Upon release, it was greeted as a success in this regard by most critics.

== Gameplay ==
All combat is weapon-based, similar to the Soulcalibur series. Rather than having a single all-purpose block button, as in most fighting games, the player must parry the enemy's strikes by executing their own attack at the same height with the correct timing, leaving the enemy vulnerable to attack. The stages are at dawn, noon, and dusk.

== Name and series ==
In Japan, the game was released as Sangokumusou. With the next installment in the series a departure in genre and style from the original Dynasty Warriors, it was entitled Shin Sangokumusou in Japan. Nevertheless, in Europe and North America, the game was released as Dynasty Warriors 2, leading to a discrepancy in title numbers that has continued ever since.

== Characters ==
The game features 16 playable characters, with 3 of each factions being unlocked from the start and 1 more of each factions are unlockable. These characters are mainly historical figures from the Three Kingdoms era of China, though three characters, Sun Shang Xiang Nobunaga based on his Nobunaga’s ambition design and Toukichi based on his Taiko Risshiden 2 design, are extra character that have clone movesets,The characters are not grouped into factions, as each have individual slots similar to most fighting games; for convenience, characters are listed according to the factions they are accorded to in later games.

Shu	Wei	Wu	Other
**Guan Yu**	Cao Cao	**Lu Xun**	**Diao Chan**
**Zhang Fei**	**Dian Wei**	Sun Shang Xiang	Lü Bu
**Zhao Yun**	**Xiahou Dun**	**Taishi Ci**	Nobunaga
Zhuge Liang	**Xu Chu**	**Zhou Yu**	Toukichi

Bold denotes default characters.

== Development ==
Dynasty Warriors was first unveiled at the November 1996 PlayStation Expo, shocking attendees familiar with Koei's track record of historical simulation video games. The character's animations were all created using motion capture.

== Reception ==
Reception

Aggregate score
Aggregator	Score
GameRankings	78%

Review scores
Publication	Score
AllGame	3.5/5
Edge	6/10
Electronic Gaming Monthly	8.125/10
Game Informer	9/10
GameRevolution	B+
GameSpot	7.2/10
IGN	7.8/10
Jeuxvideo.com	15/20
Next Generation	4/5
Dengeki PlayStation	75/100, 80/100, 80/100, 90/100
Playstation Plus	67%

Dynasty Warriors was met with positive reception upon release. GameRankings gave it a score of 78% based on 7 reviews. It was called "a fluid, masterful fighter... a breath of fresh air in a world of repetitive, eye-candied wannabes" by Game Informer and "an intriguing mix of Tekken-like polygonal fighters, a difficult but ultimately rewarding defense system, and a deep and complex backstory based on actual, historic figures" by Next Generation. Most critics said it was roughly on par with its nearest competitor, Soul Blade, though GamePro held that Soul Blade was clearly superior, elaborating that "the glaring lack of kick attacks cuts the fun in half."

Critics widely remarked that the translation of the historical setting into a fighting game was surprisingly successful, offering players an experience that is painstakingly authentic and even educational. Most also found the defensive system difficult to master but highly rewarding. Crispin Boyer remarked in Electronic Gaming Monthly that "Dynasty Warriors lets those who like and those who dislike block buttons beat each other up in peace and harmony."

The visual were also well-regarded, particularly the detail in the characters and the smoothness of the animation. However, many criticized the static, two-dimensional backgrounds, though Next Generation appended that they were most likely a necessary trade-off for the smoothness of the frame rate.
