= Dynasty Warriors 6 =

2007 video game

- The North American box art for Dynasty Warriors 6, featuring Zhao Yun.
- Developer: Omega Force
- Publisher: Koei
- Director: Tomohiko Sho
- Designers: Kenichiro Yasuda; Fumiya Kato
- Series: Dynasty Warriors
- Platforms: PlayStation 3, Xbox 360, Microsoft Windows, PlayStation 2, PlayStation Portable
- Release: PlayStation 3, Xbox 360: JP: November 11, 2007; NA: February 19, 2008; EU: March 7, 2008; AU: March 13, 2008; JP: May 28, 2009 (Empires); NA: June 23, 2009 (Empires); EU: June 26, 2009 (Empires); Microsoft Windows: JP: July 11, 2008; NA: November 24, 2008; EU: October 2008; PlayStation 2: JP: October 2, 2008; NA: November 24, 2008; PlayStation Portable: JP: October 22, 2009; JP: January 21, 2010 (Empires)
- Genre: Hack and slash
- Modes: Single-player, multiplayer

Dynasty Warriors 6 (真・三國無双５, Shin Sangoku Musō 5) is a 2008 hack and slash game developed by Omega Force and published by Koei for the PlayStation 3 and Xbox 360. It is the sixth installment in the Dynasty Warriors series. A version of the game was bundled with the 40GB PlayStation 3 in Japan. Dynasty Warriors 6 was also released for Microsoft Windows in July 2008. A version for the PlayStation 2 was released in October 2008, making it the last installment of the series to be released on this console. An expansion, titled Dynasty Warriors 6: Empires, was unveiled at the 2008 Tokyo Game Show and released in May 2009.

== Gameplay ==
This installment varies greatly from past games in the series. One of the key additions is the Renbu system, a new way for characters to build up their attack combos. In previous installments in the series, combos were affected by the quality of weapon the character was wielding, with stronger weapons allowing characters longer, more elaborate and often mightier consecutive attacks. The Renbu system replaces this system with a gauge that gradually fills as the player performs attacks. Performing attacks and dealing damage to the enemy fills the Renbu gauge, eventually earning a new rank/level, while taking damage and not attacking for awhile drops the gauge. If the player takes too much damage or goes for a long time without inflicting damage, the gauge may drop down to the previous level. However, even at Renbu Rank 1, characters will be able to perform non-ending combos. Without unlocking Renbu Ranks 3 and Infinite from the skill tree though, the player can only progress to Renbu Rank 2 (with the exception of the temporary Rank Infinity, which is acquired by collecting a certain item on the battlefield).

Another major addition is the skill tree, from which characters can earn higher Renbu Ranks, special abilities and improve their attributes. As the progression of the skill tree moves from left to right, those on the right side of the tree are harder to unlock than those on the left. The one which unlocks Infinite Renbu is normally on the furthest right.

Unique movesets for each character have been largely reduced. Only characters who have Musou Mode receive original movesets (with the exception of Diao Chan and sun shang xiang ). The rest of the characters playable only in Free Mode have cloned movesets based on the Musou Mode characters with altered properties (with the exception of Xiao Qiao, who retains her fan moveset). Due to the addition of the Renbu system, the traditional "fourth weapon" from previous games has been removed and the three normal weapons are no longer quality-based. Each obtained weapon has random stats and effects implemented and the "weight system" from previous games has been replaced by weapon categories; Standard (default type), Strength (greater attack power at the cost of Renbu Gauge being kept for a smaller amount of time), and Skill (greater attack speed with low attack power). In addition to the new weapon system, it is now possible to block from any direction. For example, if a character is attacked from behind while blocking, they will rotate their body with their weapon in front of them to guard against the enemy's attack. This eliminates the need to quickly stop blocking, change direction, and press the guard button again. Unlike previous games, horses can be found by obtaining saddles randomly dropped from boxes or defeated officers. These horses can gain levels, skills, and some can even change into the legendary Red Hare, although this is very rare.

The Musou Token that enables the use of Musou Rage has been removed. It is instead replaced by Tome item drop which allows the use of unique special attacks. There are five types of attacks; Swift Attack (increases the player's stats), Volley (launches waves of arrows), Fire (sets eruptions of fire), True Speed (boosts the player's speed), and Rockfall (launches giant boulders from above).

Dueling from Dynasty Warriors 4 returns, but has been revamped. Duels now occur on the battlefield and the nearby soldiers will circle around the two fighters, and other officers may jump into the circle, as opposed to the duel taking place in an arena that appears out of nowhere.

Bases have also been altered. They are larger and the player can now simply break down the outer gate with attacks instead of having to defeat a defense captain. There is also a new corporal unit which guards bases. Defeating troops and corporals within the base reduces the base's defense. When the defense of the base drops to zero, the player will claim the base. However, defeating the corporal is equivalent to defeating 20 troops while defeating the guard captain will automatically capture the base.

bodyguards and items have been removed. Characters now have the ability to grab

Two new 'innovations' to the series are the abilities to swim and climb ladders. The ladder means that the player can now climb onto castle battlements in scenarios such as the Battle of Hu Lao Gate, and dispose of enemy ballistas and the new 'guard' unit. The first ties in with the improvements to enemy AI, allowing them to travel across rivers and other bodies of water in order to attack the player or allied bases. Swimming is now a part of scenarios such as the Battle of Fan Castle.

== Stages ==
lots of battles from the previous games have not returned for this game such as shi shui gate Nan zhong tong gate Jing Province Wan Castle and Guan Yu's Escape

== Characters ==
The original game features 41 playable characters, a step-down from the previous installment in the series, which featured 48 playable characters. The seven removed characters are Da Qiao, Jiang Wei, Meng Huo, Pang De, Xing Cai, Zhu Rong, and Zuo Ci. Other than brief mentions in cutscenes and character biographies in-game, they do not make any appearances. Unlike previous games which featured Musou Modes for all characters, just 17 of the playable characters received stories, while the others are only playable in Free Mode and Challenge Mode. Dynasty Warriors 6: Special adds Musou Mode for six more characters, while the PSP port adds Meng Huo back to the roster, bringing the character count to 42.

* Denotes characters added through expansion titles
Bold denotes default characters

Shu	Wei	Wu	Other
Guan Ping	Cao Cao	Gan Ning	Diao Chan
**Guan Yu**	Cao Pi	Huang Gai	Dong Zhuo
Huang Zhong	Cao Ren	Ling Tong	Lu Bu
Liu Bei	**Dian Wei**	Lu Meng	Meng Huo*
Ma Chao	**Sima Yi**	**Lu Xun**	Yuan Shao
Pang Tong	**Xiahou Dun**	Sun Ce	Zhang Jiao
Wei Yan	Xiahou Yuan	Sun Jian	
Yue Ying	Xu Huang	Sun Quan	
**Zhang Fei**	Xu Zhu	**Sun Shang Xiang**	
**Zhao Yun**	Zhang He	Taishi Ci	
Zhuge Liang	Zhang Liao	Xiao Qiao	
	Zhen Ji	Zhou Tai	
		**Zhou Yu**	

== Reception ==
Reception

Aggregate scores
Aggregator	Score			
Aggregator	PC	PS2	PS3	Xbox 360
GameRankings	30%	45%	59%	61%
Metacritic	N/A	43/100	59/100	60/100

Review scores
Publication	Score			
Publication	PC	PS2	PS3	Xbox 360
Destructoid	N/A	N/A	N/A	7.5/10
Edge	N/A	N/A	7/10	N/A
Electronic Gaming Monthly	N/A	N/A	3.83/10	3.83/10
Eurogamer	N/A	N/A	8/10	N/A
Famitsu	N/A	N/A	33/40	33/40
Game Informer	N/A	N/A	7.25/10	7.25/10
GameRevolution	N/A	N/A	N/A	C−
GameSpot	N/A	4/10	6.5/10	N/A
GameSpy	N/A	N/A	3.5/5	3.5/5
GameTrailers	N/A	N/A	6.3/10	6.3/10
GameZone	N/A	4.5/10	N/A	5/10
IGN	3/10	3.5/10	5.9/10	6/10
Official Xbox Magazine (US)	N/A	N/A	N/A	5/10

The Xbox 360 and PlayStation 3 versions received "mixed" reviews and the PlayStation 2 version received "unfavorable" reviews, according to video game review aggregator Metacritic. In Japan, Famitsu gave the PlayStation 3 and Xbox 360 versions a score of one eight, one nine, and two eights for a total of 33 out of 40.

GameSpot nominated Dynasty Warriors 6 for 'least improved sequel' in their 2008 award show.

Ryan Clements of IGN said of the Xbox 360 version, "Dynasty Warriors 6 is not a good looking game, and it performs even worse on the PS3 than on the 360 (even when you opt to install the game data)." He did note that "Dynasty Warriors 6 does have a number of cool things to note. The amount of leveling up you can do is fairly impressive and each character's campaign takes at least a few hours to work through, providing you with quite a lot of content (despite the repetition)."

== Expansions ==
=== PlayStation 2 and PlayStation Portable versions ===
Dynasty Warriors 6 (真・三國無双5: Special) was released on October 2, 2008 on the PlayStation 2 in Japan and November 17, 2008 in North America. In this game, Musou modes for Ma Chao, Yue Ying, Cao Pi, Zhang He, Taishi Ci, and Ling Tong were added, and those six characters received new weapons and movesets (rather than being clones). There are also five new stages introduced in this game. The swimming and dueling abilities were removed, however. The graphics are also significantly reduced and the game suffers from heavy slowdown, most likely due to the insufficient memory capabilities.

This version was also released to the PlayStation Portable on September 17, 2009. Likely to coincide with the inclusion of Meng Huo in the Empires expansion, he was added as a Free Mode character in this game.

=== Dynasty Warriors 6: Empires ===
Dynasty Warriors 6: Empires

Aggregate scores
Aggregator	Score	
Aggregator	PS3	Xbox 360
GameRankings	64%	61%
Metacritic	62/100	59/100

Review scores
Publication	Score	
Publication	PS3	Xbox 360
Destructoid	N/A	8/10
Game Informer	6.25/10	6.25/10
GamePro	4/5	4/5
GameRevolution	C	C
GameSpot	5.5/10	5.5/10
GameZone	7.6/10	6.4/10
IGN	6.8/10	6.7/10
Official Xbox Magazine (US)	N/A	6/10
TeamXbox	N/A	7.1/10

Dynasty Warriors 6: Empires was released on May 11, 2009 in Japan, June 23 in North America and June 26 in Europe for the PlayStation 3 and Xbox 360. Like all other Empires expansions, the basic premise is to become a leader whose goal is to conquer and maintain every region of China. However, the player can also become a Vagrant (unaligned wanderer) or a vassal serving a lord, in addition to becoming a ruler. The player can step down from a force at any time, betraying their liege, or defecting to another force. The player can also make oaths of friendship with fellow officers and marry other characters.

The level-up system for weapons similar to Dynasty Warriors 4 is introduced. The player can equip various skills and abilities to the weapons. The Renbu system also returns, although it is now merely an element determined by the character's weapons.

Meng Huo, who was cut from the original game, returns with new weapons as well as seven extra stages. The game also kept all character changes and new stages exclusive to Dynasty Warriors 6 (PS2/PSP Version).

The Create Character option from Dynasty Warriors 4 returns with improvements. There is much more freedom in creating characters and the player can create up to 100 characters. Free Mode has been removed however, as the game opted for a more full and rounded Empire Mode. The game also supports Downloadable Content which mainly includes music and new costumes for characters.

Dynasty Warriors 6: Empires received "mixed" reviews on both platforms according to video game review aggregator Metacritic.

Kevin VanOrd of GameSpot said that "The combat is still dreadfully repetitive", "The visuals are still ugly", and "The sound effects and voice acting are still awful". VanOrd went on to say of Empires, "Environments are bland and lifeless; water looks awful; and character models, while clearly upgraded from Dynasty Warriors 5 Empires, still look primitive by today's standards", and gave it 5.5/10
