= Dynasty Warriors 3 =

2001 video game

- North American PlayStation 2 box art
- Developer: Omega Force
- Publishers: Koei; Koei Tecmo (Complete Edition Remastered)
- Director: Akihiro Suzuki
- Designer: Tomohiko Sho
- Series: Dynasty Warriors
- Engine: Unreal Engine 5 (Complete Edition Remastered)
- Platforms: PlayStation 2, Xbox; Complete Edition Remastered; PlayStation 5, Xbox Series X/S, Nintendo Switch 2, Windows
- Release: PlayStation 2: JP: September 20, 2001; NA: November 26, 2001; EU: March 22, 2002; Xbox: JP: September 26, 2002; NA: September 30, 2002; EU: December 6, 2002; PlayStation 5, Xbox Series X/S, Switch 2, Windows: WW: October 1, 2026
- Genre: Hack and slash
- Modes: Single-player, multiplayer

Dynasty Warriors 3 (Note: Japanese: 真・三國無双2, Hepburn: Shin Sangokumusō 2; lit. 'True Three Kingdoms Unrivaled 2') (Note: The Japanese numbering for the Dynasty Warriors series games differ from the English translations, which start counting the titles from the 1997 fighting game Dynasty Warriors. The original Japanese release of the series' second title added the Japanese prefix true/genuine (真, shin) and was named Shin Sangokumusō (真・三國無双). The English translation simply numbered it as Dynasty Warriors 2, and the main titles in the series afterward followed suit.) is a 2001 hack and slash game developed by Omega Force and published by Koei for the PlayStation 2. It is the third installment in the Dynasty Warriors series in North America and the second in the Shin: Sangoku musou series in Japan; it was also the first installment in the series to be released for the Xbox. THQ distributed the game in Europe.

Dynasty Warriors 3 was the first in the series to introduce a two player mode and numerous other improvements over Dynasty Warriors 2. New stages, characters, weapons, attacks and music are introduced providing a completely new experience to a player that has played Dynasty Warriors 2 before. The gameplay engine and the graphics engine have also been updated, providing higher quality environments, textures and general overall graphics. Only one expansion was released for the game, Dynasty Warriors 3: Xtreme Legends (Note: 真・三國無双2 猛将伝, Shin Sangokumusō 2 Mōshōden; lit. 'True Three Kingdoms Unrivaled 2 Legend of the Fierce Generals') and it was the first in the Xtreme Legends series. A modernized version of both games, Dynasty Warriors 3: Complete Edition Remastered (Note: 真・三國無双2 with 猛将伝 Remastered, Shin Sangokumusō 2 with Mōshōden Remastered; lit. 'True Three Kingdoms Unrivaled 2 with Legend of the Fierce Generals Remastered') was released for the PlayStation 5, Xbox Series X/S, Nintendo Switch 2 and Microsoft Windows (via Steam) in 2026.

== Gameplay ==
In Dynasty Warriors 3 the player takes control of an officer and must attempt to defeat the enemy commander. The player must make their way through the stage defeating soldiers and enemy officers while trying to keep their commander alive. As well as hundreds of soldiers in each stage, there are stage specific events to complete that can help the player's army and raise their morale. A higher morale means allied soldiers will attack more frequently and will be more likely to follow through with their combination attacks. To make this possible, officers and commanders have superhuman abilities and have the capability to kill hundreds of enemy soldiers per stage.

The main play mode of the game is Musou mode, the story mode of the Dynasty Warriors series. Each playable character of the three main nations have their own Musou mode which consists of a number of stages that resemble events in Romance of the Three Kingdoms. The Musou mode for each character is a linear story where the user cannot change how the story progresses. The story progression for Cao Cao, Liu Bei and Sun Jian and officers from their respective kingdoms have the closest relation to the Romance of the Three Kingdoms story.

Initially there are 15 available characters to play as, new and returning characters can be unlocked by performing special events during battle or simply meeting them during battle. Each playable character has their own unique weapon that can be upgraded and allows for a maximum of 4 levels of weapon. When the next level of weapon is obtained, its strength is greater than the level below it and adds one extra attack to the player's maximum number of attacks.

Items are also hidden throughout stages and can also be obtained by defeating officers. There are three types of items in game, normal items, red items and weapons which can be equipped before the stage begins and will increase the player's statistics. Red items are specialised items than cause a special effect, such as starting the stage mounted on a horse or giving the player the ability to shoot fire arrows.

Dynasty Warriors 3 has an RPG element to it where the player can increase the attack, defence, life bar or Musou bar of the characters. This can be achieved by defeating enemy officers and gate captains who will drop items that will increase the aforementioned statistics. Although it is not necessary to collect these items, it is helpful to the player as in later stages as enemies grow in strength.

The two player mode (new to Dynasty Warriors 3) allows players to either go head-to-head in one-on-one fights or play co-operatively in any of the stages. The screen is split horizontally with player one on top and the second below. In one-on-one fights, the characters' statistics are reduced to their default to allow for a fair battle, relying more on the player's skill rather than who has the stronger character. In co-operative play the characters retain their saved statistics, there are no alterations to the stage and the players gain the ability to perform a more powerful version of their Musou attack (Special Attack). If the players perform their Musou attack at the same time within range of each other, the attack gains a lightning element and deals extra damage to enemies that are hit.

== Plot ==
=== Setting ===
Dynasty Warriors 3 is set across ancient China in the Three Kingdoms era. The game begins at the fall of the Han dynasty shortly before the death of the Emperor Ling when the leader of the Way of Peace, Zhang Jiao, led an uprising against the Empire.

The game features a strong mix of fact and fiction from Chinese history and often exaggerates characters and their personalities. For example, Lu Bu is portrayed as a virtually unbeatable, violent maniac. Most of the events and stages are reported to have occurred in the Three Kingdoms era during the struggle of power. The three kingdoms primarily involved, Shu, Wu and Wei, each sought power enough to overthrow the other two and unify China under their rule. Although the story in Dynasty Warriors is not perfect in the sense that it does not accurately follow the historical events, it has been changed to make the game more playable and less repetitive. For example, a number of the characters in the game died in the time frame that the game is set, but they still appear in later stages. The game features environments resembling that of ancient China and various items from the era such as fairy wine and dim sum.

It also touches on mysticism as some characters (Zhuge Liang, Sima Yi, Pang Tong, Zhang Jiao) have either magical elements in their attacks or completely magical attacks.

=== Stages ===
Many of the stages are recreations of notable battles present historically or from the novel Romance of the Three Kingdoms, while original creations became more common with the newer installments.

Year	Stage
184	The Yellow Turban Rebellion
191	Battle of Hu Lao Gate
191	A Surprise Attack on Liu Biao
197	Battle of Wan Castle
197	Assault on the Wu Territory
200	Battle of Guan Du
200	Guan Yu's Escape
208	Battle of Chang Ban
208	Battle of Chi Bi
211	Battle of Tong Gate
214	Assault on Cheng Du
215	Battle of He Fei
219	Battle of Mt. Ding Jun
219	Battle of Fan Castle
222	Battle of Yi Ling
225	The Nanman Campaign
228	Battle of Jie Ting
228	Battle of You Ting
234	Battle of He Fei Castle
234	Battle of Wu Zhang Plains

=== Characters ===
Shu	Wei	Wu	Other
**Guan Yu**	Cao Cao	Da Qiao*	Diao Chan
Huang Zhong	**Dian Wei**	Gan Ning	Dong Zhuo
Jiang Wei	Sima Yi	**Huang Gai***	Fu Xi*
Liu Bei	**Xiahou Dun**	Lu Meng	Lu Bu
Ma Chao	Xiahou Yuan	Lu Xun	Meng Huo*
Pang Tong*	Xu Huang*	Sun Ce*	Nu Wa*
Wei Yan*	Xu Zhu	Sun Jian	Yuan Shao
**Zhang Fei**	**Zhang He***	Sun Quan	Zhang Jiao
**Zhao Yun**	Zhang Liao	**Sun Shang Xiang**	Zhu Rong*
Zhuge Liang	Zhen Ji*	Taishi Ci	Ziluan**
		Xiao Qiao*	
		**Zhou Yu**	

- * Denotes new characters to the series
- ** Denotes characters added through Dynasty Warriors 3: Complete Edition Remastered
  **Bold** denotes default characters

The characters in Dynasty Warriors 3 are based around real and semi-fictional characters from Romance of the Three Kingdoms and that era, where some characters personalities and traits have been exaggerated and where some remain fairly true to the novel. Women of that era did not participate in any of the battles but there are a number of female playable characters in the game (Diao Chan, Xiao Qiao, Da Qiao, Zhen Ji, Sun Shang Xiang, Zhu Rong, Nu Wa). Zhu Rong and Nu Wa are exceptions as Zhu Rong was said to be the only female to have fought in that era and Nu Wa's character is fictional and based on ancient myth.

== Remaster ==
On 24 September 2025, Koei Tecmo announced Dynasty Warriors 3: Complete Edition Remastered (Note: 真・三國無双2 with 猛将伝 Remastered, Shin Sangokumusō 2 with Mōshōden Remastered; lit. 'True Three Kingdoms Unrivaled 2 with Legend of the Fierce Generals Remastered') with celebrate 25th anniversary of Dynasty Warriors, a modernized version of the original 2001 game. This remaster features enhanced graphics using Unreal Engine 5, with a planned release date on 19 March 2026. However, recent news out of Koei Tecmo report that the game's release date has been postponed, but is still set to release some time in 2026. The release date was announced as October 1, 2026 in a June 2026 State of Play.

== Reception ==
Dynasty Warriors 3

Aggregate scores
Aggregator	Score	
Aggregator	PS2	Xbox
GameRankings	77.33%	76.01%
Metacritic	78/100	70/100

Review scores
Publication	Score	
Publication	PS2	Xbox
AllGame	3.5/5	3.5/5
Electronic Gaming Monthly	7.67/10	N/A
Famitsu	34/40	N/A
Game Informer	7/10	7.25/10
GamePro	3.5/5	3.5/5
GameRevolution	B+	N/A
GameSpot	7.1/10	7.3/10
IGN	8.5/10	6.8/10
Official U.S. PlayStation Magazine	4/5	N/A
Official Xbox Magazine (US)	N/A	7/10

Dynasty Warriors 3: Complete Edition Remastered

Aggregate scores
Aggregator	Score
Metacritic	(Win) 79/100 (PS5) 73/100 (NS2) 79/100
OpenCritic	67% recommend

Review scores
Publication	Score
Hardcore Gamer	3.5/5
Nintendo World Report	8.5/10
Push Square	7/10
TechRadar	4/5

The game was highly anticipated after its release being announced because of its numerous new features and improvements of the last in the series. Afterwards, it was met with positive to average reception upon release; GameRankings and Metacritic gave it a score of 77% and 78 out of 100 for the PlayStation 2 version, and 76% and 70 out of 100 for the Xbox version.

In just under four months, over 1 million copies of Dynasty Warriors 3 had been sold in North America and Japan combined and made it the first of Koei's games to pass one million sales on a single platform and making it a platinum title. Not only that but it topped the sales charts for five consecutive weeks and, according to Famitsu, it was ranked the 9th best selling game of 2001.

Dynasty Warriors 3 still retains a number of the bad features that were in the previous game such as fogging and low quality English voice actors. Although the English voices were poor (they have gained a cult-like status among fans of the series), the player has the choice to turn on Japanese voices and they are considered to be of a much higher quality. IGN strongly criticized the Xbox version over the sound, both music and the voice acting. Despite a number of negative points coming up throughout the review it scored 6.8/10 and the reviewer saw it had potential to become a very good game.

Famitsu gave the PS2 version 34 out of 40. Chi Kong Lui of GameCritics.com looked past the sound and graphical flaws and concentrated more on the gameplay and setting, giving a high score of 9/10. He gave high praise to how much the game was based on the original Romance of the Three Kingdoms story and even went as far as saying "All the costuming of the 3D models is ethnically authentic and beautifully lavished" whereas a number of reviews described the graphical quality as being plain and blurry (Such as the said IGN review). It is also notable that the IGN review was based on the PS2 version, which has more fog and slowdown (especially in multi-player) when compared to the Xbox version, and those were his two heaviest faults of the game.

=== Awards ===
On March 6, 2003, Dynasty Warriors 3 received Animation Magazine's "Best Overall Game Animation" award. This was Koei's first award for a Dynasty Warriors game.

== Expansion ==
Dynasty Warriors 3: Xtreme Legends

Aggregate scores
Aggregator	Score
GameRankings	71.34%
Metacritic	72/100

Review scores
Publication	Score
Electronic Gaming Monthly	6.5/10
Eurogamer	7/10
Famitsu	33/40 (Note: Famitsu magazines use a combined total score from four reviewers. Each individual score ranges from 0 to 10, with a total maximum of 40.)
Game Informer	6.75/10
GamePro	3.5/5
GameSpot	7.1/10
GameSpy	3/5
GameZone	7.5/10
Official U.S. PlayStation Magazine	3.5/5

Dynasty Warriors 3: Xtreme Legends is the first Xtreme Legends installment by publisher Koei and developer Omega Force for the PlayStation 2. This expansion to Dynasty Warriors 3 was released for Japan on August 29, 2002 and on January 11, 2003, within the US and Europe.

Xtreme Legends added several new features to Dynasty Warriors 3, including new items and the ability to fully customize bodyguards. Xtreme Legends also included a Musou Mode for the playable characters who did not belong to either Wu, Wei, or Shu (Diao Chan, Lu Bu, Zhang Jiao, Dong Zhuo, Yuan Shao, Zhu Rong and Meng Huo). Xtreme Legends also allowed players to obtain a fifth-level weapon for each character and added two new difficulty levels: Beginner and Expert. (Otherwise referred to as "Novice" and "Very Hard" in game, respectively.)

The player can also import content from the DW3 disc while playing Xtreme Legends by using the "Load Original" option. If played by itself, DW3:XL only features its own scenarios and Musou modes. It can, however, copy data from a previously saved DW3 file on the memory card, but only if there's already a DW3 data before creating DW3:XL save data.

Xtreme Legends was met with average reception upon release, as GameRankings gave it a score of 71%, while Metacritic gave it 72 out of 100. Famitsu gave it a score of 33 out of 40.
