= Dynasty Warriors =

Video game series

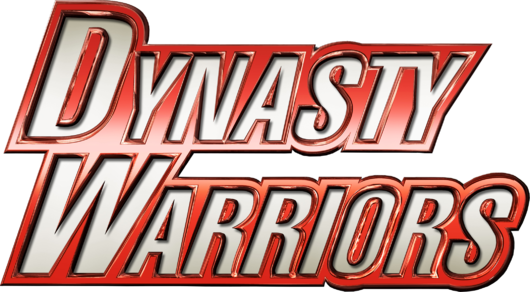
- Original international logo (above) and original Japanese logo (below)
- Genres: Hack and slash Fighting; Action role-playing Action-adventure; Real-time strategy
- Developer: Omega Force
- Publishers: Koei (1997–2010); Koei Tecmo (2010–present)
- Platforms: Game Boy Advance; PlayStation; PlayStation 2 PlayStation 3 PlayStation 4 PlayStation 5 PlayStation Portable; PlayStation Vita; Nintendo DS; Nintendo 3DS; GameCube; Wii; Wii U Nintendo Switch; Nintendo Switch 2 Xbox; Xbox 360; Xbox One; Xbox Series X/S; Windows iOS; Android
- First release: Dynasty Warriors; February 28, 1997
- Latest release: Dynasty Warriors: Origins; January 17, 2025
- Parent series: Romance of the Three Kingdoms

Dynasty Warriors

Chinese name
- Chinese: 真·三國無雙
- Simplified Chinese: 真·三国无双
Transcriptions
Standard Mandarin
- Hanyu Pinyin: Zhēn Sānguówúshuāng
- Bopomofo: ㄓㄣ · ㄙㄢ ㄍㄨㄛˊ ㄨˊ ㄕㄨㄤ
- Wade–Giles: Chen^{1} San^{1}-kuo^{2}-wu^{2}-shuang^{1}

Japanese name
- Kanji: 真・三國無双
- Hiragana: しん・さんごくむそう
- Kyūjitai: 眞・三國無雙
- Shinjitai: 真・三国無双
Transcriptions
- Romanization: Shin Sangokumusō
- Nihon-shiki: Sin Sankokumusô

Dynasty Warriors (真・三國無双, Shin Sangokumusō; lit. "True Three Kingdoms Unrivaled") is a series of Japanese hack and slash action video games created by Omega Force and Koei (now Koei Tecmo). The series is a spin-off of Koei's turn-based strategy Romance of the Three Kingdoms series, based upon the Chinese novel of the same name, which is a romanticised retelling of the Chinese Three Kingdoms period.

The first game in the series, titled Dynasty Warriors in English and Sangokumusō in Japanese, is a fighting game, a separate genre from the rest of the games in the series. Koei later created a new game as a spin-off and added the word shin (真; true, genuine) to the beginning of the title to differentiate it from its predecessor. When the game was localized for the North American market, the name became Dynasty Warriors 2. Since then, all English titles have been numbered one higher than their Japanese counterparts. Because the original Dynasty Warriors game belongs to a separate genre and has a different series title in Japan, Koei Tecmo does not consider it a formal entry in the Dynasty Warriors series. (Note: In 2009, Koei merged with the company Tecmo, creating Koei Tecmo.) This is evidenced by Koei-Tecmo's celebration of the series' 20th anniversary in 2020, two decades after the release of Dynasty Warriors 2.

In 2008, it was Koei's most successful franchise, and as of 2025, the series has sold more than 24 million copies worldwide.

== Main series ==
Release timeline
1997	Dynasty Warriors
1998
1999
2000	2
2001	3
2002
2003	4
2004
2005	5
2006
2007	6
2008
2009
2010
2011	7
2012
2013	8
2014
2015
2016
2017
2018	9
2019
2020
2021
2022
2023
2024
2025	Origins

The first Dynasty Warriors (Sangokumusō) is a traditional one-on-one fighting game, released in 1997 for the PlayStation. Its gameplay style is reminiscent of Samurai Shodown, The Last Blade, Virtua Fighter and Soul Blade.

The next game was released in Japan as Shin Sangokumusou. This game was released in other countries as Dynasty Warriors 2, leading to the discrepancy in title numbers. From this game onwards, the player chooses a playable character and plays a number of levels representing particular battles in the Three Kingdoms period, eventually defeating all other rival kingdoms and uniting China under a common ruler. In this game mode, known as "Musou Mode", the generals are usually chosen from one of the three kingdoms (Wu, Shu or Wei; however, from Dynasty Warriors 3: Xtreme Legends onwards, independent generals were given full stories as well). Dynasty Warriors 3 has two secret characters, Nü Wa and Fu Xi, that are not playable in Musou Mode.

Dynasty Warriors 2, Dynasty Warriors 3, Dynasty Warriors 5 and Dynasty Warriors 6 have individual Musou Modes for each character. In Dynasty Warriors 4, Dynasty Warriors 7, and Dynasty Warriors 8, each of the Three Kingdoms has its own Musou Mode, which all characters from a particular kingdom would play. The stages are presented in a third-person view, with the camera set behind the player as they engage the enemy forces. Each scenario can have different win/lose conditions, but the common losing conditions (defeat of the commander-in-chief, health bar reaching zero and maximum time limit reached) still hold. As for the other characters not from either of the Three Kingdoms, their Musou story modes are purely fictional since in Romance of the Three Kingdoms, most or all of them were eliminated until only the Three Kingdoms were left.

In Dynasty Warriors 5, a relatively more realistic Musou Mode is introduced for each character. Instead of participating in the entire set of their kingdoms' events, the characters appear only in certain battles that they had fought in, as according to the novel or factual history. Therefore, characters will start at different points in time and they may never have opportunities to encounter some of the other characters (e.g. Zhuge Liang will never meet Lü Bu or Dong Zhuo in his Musou Mode). In between stages there are some dramatic cutscenes, in which the character will express their thoughts on the situation, adding a more personal touch and keeping the player updated on the events. Besides, a character's Musou Mode may end before the unification of China at any point of time, stopping for most at their historical point of death. However, some characters such as the three founders (Liu Bei, Cao Cao, and Sun Jian) may continue to participate in battles that occurred after their deaths (e.g. Cao Cao appearing at the Battle of Wuzhang Plains), representing an extended leadership under more successful circumstances.

In Dynasty Warriors 8, an "if" route is added for each country. By fulfilling conditions in previous battles, the player can unlock a hypothetical route for each country where it manages to achieve what it failed to do in actual history. For example, the player can help Wei avoid defeat in the battle of Chibi and unite China with all Wei characters alive.

Dynasty Warriors 9 sought to introduce an "open world" style of gameplay.

== Xtreme Legends and Empires ==
In 2002, an Xtreme Legends (猛将伝, Mōshōden) expansion was released for Dynasty Warriors 3 in Japan, with international releases to follow in 2003. This expansion features an overhauled bodyguard system as well as new stages, weapons, more difficulty settings and challenge modes. The Dynasty Warriors 3: Xtreme Legends' expansion disc only held the new content, so in order to access the new content in the base-game, players would require the original game disc. The following games would continue the tradition by having Xtreme Legends expansion, save for Dynasty Warriors 6 and Dynasty Warriors 9. New characters were also added through the Xtreme Legends expansions with Dynasty Warriors 7 and Dynasty Warriors 8.

Beginning in 2004, another expansion line, titled Empires was first released for Dynasty Warriors 4. In Empires, the game would combine the action gameplay of the regular series with strategical and tactical elements from Koei's earlier series Romance of the Three Kingdoms. Unlike the Xtreme Legends, Empires did not require the original game disc to access all of its features. The following numbered entries would all receive an Empires expansion.

== Portable games ==
In 2004, Koei created the first Dynasty Warriors title for portable game handhelds, Dynasty Warriors, on PlayStation Portable, and in the following year, Dynasty Warriors Advance for Game Boy Advance. The sequel of the first PSP game, Dynasty Warriors Vol. 2 was released in 2006. In 2007, Koei released Dynasty Warriors DS: Fighter's Battle for the Nintendo DS. Another PSP game based on Dynasty Warriors 6, Dynasty Warriors: Strikeforce was released in 2009, which was followed up by a sequel, Shin Sangokumusō: Multi Raid 2 in 2010. A PlayStation Vita game, Dynasty Warriors Next, was released in 2011 as a launch title, and a Nintendo 3DS game, Shin Sangokumusō VS (真・三國無双 VS), was released in April 2012. Another portable game was announced in September 2020 for iOS and Android, titled Shin Sangokumusō (真・三國無双).

Other than titles specifically made for handhelds, select main Dynasty Warriors titles have also been ported to handhelds, all of which are only available in Japan. The PS2 version of Dynasty Warriors 6, Dynasty Warriors 6: Special was also ported to the PSP, which was soon followed by the Empires expansion in 2010. A port of Dynasty Warriors 7, Shin Sangokumusou 6: Special was released in 2011 for PSP, based on the Xtreme Legends expansion but without including the three new characters added for the expansion. A PS Vita port of Dynasty Warriors 8 was released in 2013, which includes features from the Xtreme Legends expansion for that game. Later, in 2015, the Empires expansion of Dynasty Warriors 8 was also released on the PS Vita, notably also compatible with the PlayStation TV.

== PC games ==
Dynasty Warriors 4: Hyper in 2005 is marked as the first DW game for the PC. Hyper was a port of Dynasty Warriors 4 for the PS2, and had harder AI, more enemies on screen and smoother textures.

In 2006, Dynasty Warriors BB (renamed Dynasty Warriors Online in 2007) was released as an online game. As of January 10, 2014 Aeria Games shut down the servers for Dynasty Warriors Online in America. Next to Dynasty Warriors 4: Hyper, Dynasty Warriors 5 Special was released for PC in 2006, Dynasty Warriors 6 was released for PC in 2008. Also Samurai Warriors 2 released in 2009. The PC port of Dynasty Warriors 7 with Extreme Legends was released on March 9, 2012.

- Dynasty Warriors 7: Xtreme Legends - Definitive Edition released on December 6, 2018.
- Dynasty Warriors 8: Xtreme Legends - Complete Edition released on May 13, 2014.
- Dynasty Warriors 8: Empires released on February 27, 2015.
- Dynasty Warriors 9 released on February 13, 2018.
- Dynasty Warriors 9: Empires was announced on September 27, 2020, and was released in Japan in December 2021 and the rest of the world in February 2022.
- Dynasty Warriors: Origins was released on January 17, 2025, though was playable from January 14, 2025 for those with the Digital Deluxe Edition.

== Characters ==
The Dynasty Warriors game series, although referenced to factual people, is known for changing the traditional ways of how some of the historical characters were depicted in Romance of the Three Kingdoms or in historical records. For example, Zhang He appears to be more feminine while Wei Yan becomes a bestial tribal warrior, while historical accounts depict both to be relatively normal generals with no outstanding characteristics such as these. Some of them also wield weapons that are anachronistic, such as Ling Tong's nunchaku and Sun Ce's tonfas. A touch of mysticism is also added, as some characters such as Zhuge Liang, Sima Yi and Zuo Ci have the ability to use magic in their attacks. Female characters (except Zhurong and Wang Yi) who did not participate in any battles in the novel or in history are depicted as fearsome female warriors with exceptional fighting skills and weapons.

A total of 96 characters have been made playable at some point in the series (not counting spin-offs); however, only 94 currently make mainstay appearances as of Dynasty Warriors 9. Each of these characters is armed with a weapon that may be a conventional historical one, an exotic martial arts weapon or a magical weapon that enhances their mystical powers. From Dynasty Warriors 3 onward, each character can choose from a range of weapons with their own power-ups and ability enhancements, as well as higher-level weapons that extend their attack chain.

== Spin-offs and licensed games ==
Release timeline
2002	Dynasty Warriors 3: Xtreme Legends
2003	Dynasty Warriors 4: Xtreme Legends
2004	Dynasty Warriors 4: Empires
2005	Dynasty Warriors Advance Dynasty Warriors 5: Xtreme Legends
2006	Dynasty Warriors Vol. 2 Dynasty Warriors 5: Empires Dynasty Warriors Online
2007	Dynasty Warriors: Gundam Warriors Orochi Dynasty Warriors DS: Fighter's Battle
2008	Warriors Orochi 2 Dynasty Warriors 6: Special Dynasty Warriors: Gundam 2
2009	Dynasty Warriors: Strikeforce Musou Orochi Z Dynasty Warriors 6: Empires
2010	Fist of the North Star: Ken's Rage Dynasty Warriors: Gundam 3
2011	Dynasty Warriors 7: Special Dynasty Warriors 7: Xtreme Legends Dynasty Warriors Next Warriors Orochi 3
2012	One Piece: Pirate Warriors Dynasty Warriors 7: Empires Fist of the North Star: Ken's Rage 2
2013	One Piece: Pirate Warriors 2 Dynasty Warriors 8: Xtreme Legends
2014	Hyrule Warriors Dynasty Warriors 8: Empires
2015	Dragon Quest Heroes One Piece: Pirate Warriors 3 Arslan: The Warriors of Legend
2016	Dragon Quest Heroes II Dynasty Warriors: Godseekers Berserk and the Band of the Hawk
2017	Warriors All-Stars Fire Emblem Warriors
2018	Warriors Orochi 4
2019
2020	Persona 5 Strikers One Piece: Pirate Warriors 4 Hyrule Warriors: Age of Calamity
2021	Dynasty Warriors 9: Empires
2022	Touken Ranbu Warriors Fire Emblem Warriors: Three Hopes
2023
2024
2025	Warriors: Abyss Hyrule Warriors: Age of Imprisonment
2026	Dynasty Warriors 3: Complete Edition Remastered

Following the success of Dynasty Warriors, Koei released Dynasty Tactics in 2002 and its sequel, Dynasty Tactics 2 in the following year, focusing on strategy and tactics in the same Three Kingdoms setting.

Probably the third most recognized franchise of Koei, Samurai Warriors (Sengoku Musou in Japan), was introduced in 2004. Instead of the Three Kingdoms era, the series uses Japan's Sengoku period. As a result, the game's roster consists of characters from that era, while having gameplay similar to that of Dynasty Warriors. The game would be followed by Samurai Warriors 2 in 2006, Samurai Warriors 3 in 2009, Samurai Warriors 4 in 2014, and Samurai Warriors 5 in 2021. as well as numerous other spin-off titles. As with the original series, Samurai Warriors also has the Xtreme Legends and Empires expansions, with the former beginning on the first game and the latter on the second game.

A tactical role-playing game, Dynasty Warriors: Godseekers was announced on April 5, 2016, with a Japanese release date in 2016 for the PlayStation 3, PlayStation 4, and PlayStation Vita. It will be the series' first strategy RPG, featuring a turn-based system and a world map. The game will also completely deviate from history by introducing a completely new story line involving fictitious mystical elements, with Zhao Yun as the main protagonist.

Other related titles include:

- Dynasty Warriors Mahjong (Jan Sangoku Musou in Japan), which is completely different from the rest of the series, as it has the same characters play the game of mahjong, rather than having the gameplay of the original games.
- Dynasty Warriors: Gundam (Gundam Musou in Japan) was released in 2007, combining the popular Gundam franchise with Dynasty Warriors gameplay. The game would be followed by three more sequels: Dynasty Warriors: Gundam 2 released in 2008, Dynasty Warriors: Gundam 3 in 2010, and Dynasty Warriors: Gundam Reborn in 2013, which also serves as a remake of the entire series.
- Warriors Orochi (Musou Orochi in Japan), released in 2007 crosses the Dynasty Warriors and Samurai Warriors series to create a fictional crossover. The game introduces the three-man team and have a modified gameplay from both series. The game was followed by a direct sequel Warriors Orochi 2 (called Musou Orochi: Mao Sairin in Japan) which reuses the same gameplay of the original game with the focus on adding new stories. A compilation of the two games, Musou Orochi Z was released in 2009, thus far has not been brought overseas. The third game, Warriors Orochi 3, was released in 2011. The game had a different engine and gameplay than the first two games, and noticeably titled Musou Orochi 2 in Japan (as the second game is considered as an expansion to the first game). The third game would have several ports and updates that would expand on the content, including a port for PlayStation Portable and Wii U in 2012, and an Ultimate update in 2013, which was re-released as a definitive edition including all downloadable content for the game in July 12, 2022 for Microsoft Windows. A fourth game titled Warriors Orochi 4 (released in Japan as Musou Orochi 3) was released September 27, 2018.
- Bladestorm: The Hundred Years' War, a historical real-time tactics spinoff, released in 2007. The game is loosely based on the Hundred Years' War between the Kingdoms of England and France in the 14th and 15th centuries.
- Fist of the North Star: Ken's Rage (Hokuto Musou in Japan), a spin-off based on the manga and anime series Fist of the North Star, was released in 2010. It is the first game in the Warriors series to receive an M rating by the ESRB, due to its faithful depiction of the manga's highly graphic and violent fight scenes. It was followed by a sequel, Fist of the North Star: Ken's Rage 2 (Shin Hokuto Musou in Japan) in 2012, which other than featuring a continuation of the first game's story with revamped gameplay, also serves as a remake of the first game. The sequel was made to celebrate the manga series' 30th anniversary.
- Warriors: Legends of Troy (Troy Musou in Japan), the second game in the Warriors series to receive an M rating by the ESRB, released for the PlayStation 3 and Xbox 360 in 2011.
- One Piece: Pirate Warriors (One Piece Kaizoku Musou in Japan), a game inspired by the anime and manga series One Piece was released in 2012 for PlayStation 3. The game was followed by three sequels, One Piece: Pirate Warriors 2, released the following year in 2013, which features an original story instead of a continuation of the series' canon, One Piece: Pirate Warriors 3, released in 2015 for the PlayStation 4 and PlayStation Vita in addition to the PS3 and PC and One Piece: Pirate Warriors 4 released for the PlayStation 4, Xbox One, Nintendo Switch and PC on March 27, 2020.
- Hyrule Warriors (Zelda Musou in Japan), a game inspired by The Legend of Zelda video game franchise owned by Nintendo. The game was originally released in 2014 exclusively for the Wii U. An enhanced port for Nintendo 3DS featuring additional characters and story content, Hyrule Warriors Legends, was released in 2016, with the additional characters and future downloadable content also releasing on the Wii U version. A third version for the Nintendo Switch, Hyrule Warriors: Definitive Edition, was announced and released in 2018, with all the features and downloadable content from previous versions of the game.
- Arslan: The Warriors of Legend (Arslan Senki x Musou in Japan), a game inspired by The Heroic Legend of Arslan fantasy novel series by Yoshiki Tanaka. It was based on the 2015 anime television adaptation sponsored by Koei Tecmo, which in turn is based on the 2013 manga adaptation by Hiromu Arakawa. It was released on October 1, 2015, for the PlayStation 3 and PlayStation 4. An Xbox One version was released as well, but only in Europe and North America. Arslan was released February 10, 2016 for Microsoft Windows.
- Berserk and the Band of the Hawk (Berserk Musou in Japan), a game inspired by the Berserk manga series. It was released for PlayStation 4, PlayStation 3 and PlayStation Vita in Japan on October 27, 2016. The game is confirmed for a western release, which was revealed at Tokyo Game Show 2016 as February 21, 2017. A European release date for February 24, 2017 was also announced. The PlayStation 3 version will not release outside Japan and a PC version is in development for a simultaneous release with the PlayStation 4 and PlayStation Vita versions on the western markets. It is the fourth Warriors title to be rated M.
- Warriors All-Stars, a game based similar to the Warriors Orochi series featuring characters from various Koei Tecmo franchises such as Ninja Gaiden, Dead or Alive, Toukiden and Atelier. The game was released in Japan on PlayStation 4 and PlayStation Vita on March 30, 2017; an English release was released on August 29, 2017.
- Dynasty Warriors: Godseekers, is a tactical game with new and old characters, that was released on February 1, 2017.
- Fire Emblem Warriors (Fire Emblem Musou in Japan), a crossover between the Warriors franchise and Nintendo's Fire Emblem series of tactical role-playing games, was released for the Nintendo Switch and New Nintendo 3DS on September 27, 2017.
- Persona 5 Strikers (Persona 5 Scramble: The Phantom Strikers in Japan), a crossover between the series and Atlus's 2016 role-playing game Persona 5, takes place six months after the events of the original game. It was released in Japan for the PlayStation 4 and Nintendo Switch on February 20, 2020, with a worldwide release on February 23, 2021. It is the fifth M-rated Warriors title.
- Hyrule Warriors: Age of Calamity (Zelda Musou: Calamity Apocalypse in Japan), a successor to Hyrule Warriors and an alternate-universe prequel to the events of the 2017 game The Legend of Zelda: Breath of the Wild, was released exclusively for the Nintendo Switch on November 20, 2020. Within its first four days, the game shipped over 3 million copies worldwide, making it the single best-selling game in the entire Warriors franchise.
- Fire Emblem Warriors: Three Hopes, a successor to Fire Emblem Warriors, was released exclusively for the Nintendo Switch on June 24, 2022. The game features an alternate story set in the universe of the 2019 game Fire Emblem: Three Houses and is likewise split amongst three different routes, each with their own unique playable characters, scenarios, and outcomes.
- Hyrule Warriors: Age of Imprisonment (Zelda Musou: Chronicle of the Sealing War in Japan), the third Hyrule Warriors game and a prequel to the events of the 2023 game The Legend of Zelda: Tears of the Kingdom, was released on November 6, 2025 for the Nintendo Switch 2.

== Future ==
In January 2018, the president of Koei Tecmo, Hisashi Koinuma, said that he wanted to make a Dynasty Warriors spin-off using characters and settings from the Star Wars franchise from Lucasfilm after they managed to be successful with Nioh and Fire Emblem Warriors. Koinuma chose Star Wars to be able to make a Science fiction Warriors series. However, as Electronic Arts owns the game rights to the Star Wars franchise, it would be a difficult collaboration to achieve, and is more of a future goal. As of 2021, EA have lost the exclusivity rights in developing Star Wars games and in the development of their other projects such as Samurai Warriors 5, Koinuma reiterated that both Super Mario and Star Wars in a Dynasty Warriors format are projects he personally wanted to do it in the future.

== Film adaptation ==
On 15 March 2016, Suzuki Akihiro and the Hong Kong-based company HMV Digital China announced at the 20th Hong Kong International Film and TV Market that they will be making a live-action film adaptation of Dynasty Warriors. The film will be directed by Roy Chow, produced and written by Christine To, and to be released in 2017. On 8 July 2017, HMV Digital China's executive chairman Stephen Shiu Jr. revealed on his weibo that the film will start shooting on 11 July. He also revealed that he had approached Koei Tecmo four years ago and secured the rights to adapt the Dynasty Warriors franchise into a movie. On 11 July, Shiu announced that Han Geng, Wang Kai, Louis Koo, Tony Yang and Gulnazar are part of the main cast. On 28 September 2017, director Roy Chow announced that after 63 days of filming in mainland China, the team will be moving to New Zealand in November 2017 to shoot the background scenes.

Shooting for Dynasty Warriors wrapped up on 28 November 2017. The pre-production phase took eight months, the principal photography phase lasted five months, and the post-production phase was expected to take up to a year. A trailer for the film was released in 2018, stating a release was planned for 2019. The film was released on April 29, 2021, in Hong Kong, and in China on April 30, 2021. The film was made available via Netflix in the UK in June 2021 and other regions in July 2021.

== Stages ==
Many of the stages are recreations of notable battles in the late Han dynasty and Three Kingdoms periods, that are usually depicted in Romance of the Three Kingdoms. There are also some original creations in the newer installments that are also historical, such as the battle between the Nanman and Wu.

== Music ==
The music for the Dynasty Warriors game series is a mixture of traditional Chinese instrumentals, hard rock and heavy metal. Most stages have their own exclusive music tracks played and the tracks change according to the battle situation or events. In licensed titles, the music falls between mixing metal instrumentalisation with compositions from the source material along with original songs made in the same vein as those from the licensed IP. There are notable cases where compositions deviate completely from the hard rock roots of most Dynasty Warriors titles and simply intensify the original musical style from the IP, an example is Hyrule Warriors: Age of Calamity, which forewent the heavy metal remixes that Hyrule Warriors used, and instead reprised the more subdued compositions from The Legend of Zelda: Breath of the Wild with stronger, and more bombastic orchestral tracks.
