= Dynasty Warriors 5 =

2005 video game

- North American PlayStation 2 box art
- Developer: Omega Force
- Publisher: Koei
- Director: Takashi Morinaka
- Producer: Takazumi Tomoike
- Designer: Tomohiko Sho
- Composers: Toru Hasabe; Masayoshi Sasaki
- Series: Dynasty Warriors
- Platforms: PlayStation 2, Xbox, Xbox 360, Windows
- Release: February 24, 2005: PlayStation 2; JP: February 24, 2005; NA: April 1, 2005; PAL: June 24, 2005 Xbox; JP: August 25, 2005; NA: September 13, 2005; PAL: September 23, 2005 Xbox 360; JP: March 23, 2006; NA: March 28, 2006; PAL: June 23, 2006 Windows; JP: June 22, 2006
- Modes: Single-player, multiplayer

Dynasty Warriors 5 (Note: Japanese: 真・三國無双4, Hepburn: Shin Sangokumusō 4; lit. 'True Three Kingdoms Unrivaled 4') (Note: The Japanese numbering for the Dynasty Warriors series games differ from the English translations, which start counting the titles from the 1997 fighting game Dynasty Warriors. The original Japanese release of the series' second title added the Japanese prefix true/genuine (真, shin) and was named Shin Sangokumusō (真・三國無双). The English translation simply numbered it as Dynasty Warriors 2, and the main titles in the series afterward followed suit.) is a 2005 hack and slash game developed by Omega Force and published by Koei for the PlayStation 2. It is the fifth installment in the Dynasty Warriors series. It features a number of improvements, such as new characters, new base system characters, specific endings, and new gameplay features. The game was later ported to Xbox 360 and Microsoft Windows as Shin Sangoku Musou 4 Special on December 22, 2006, the Windows version being available only in Asia.

== Gameplay ==
Auto-lock has been removed, as in Dynasty Warriors 4: Empires, and taunting has been removed. A white circle now appears when the player approaches a horse. Characters who previously had grab or elemental projectile attacks now have a shockwave or hovering elemental spheres for their charge attack. Weapons are again found in boxes and obtained by defeating officers rather than by leveling up, but they now have a weight system: light weapons have fast swings but weaker damage, heavy weapons have higher damage but slower swings, and medium weapons are balanced. Some weapons have evolution attacks, which add four more hits to the combo string if the Musou gauge is full. A new battlefield item, the Musou Token, has been added; by pressing the R3 button, the character enters "Musou Rage". In this state, the character becomes faster, stronger, and more durable, and can perform true Musou attacks regardless of health. Bases have also been added.

=== Modes ===
Musou Mode returns to being character-based rather than kingdom-based but, unlike in Dynasty Warriors 3, it is now five stages long instead of eight; the leaders of the kingdoms and characters from other factions have four stages. Musou Mode now features characters speaking between stages and a unique ending for each character. Free Mode allows the player to play any level with any character. Both Musou Mode and Free Mode allow two-player cooperative gameplay. Challenge Mode introduces a number of specialized stages with specific objectives, including time trials and survival. The Encyclopedia feature gives a summary of the novel Romance of the Three Kingdoms and descriptions of its battles and officers.

== Characters ==
* Denotes new characters to the series
Bold denotes characters available by default

| Shu | Wei | Wu | Other |
|---|---|---|---|
| Guan Ping* | Cao Cao | Da Qiao | Diao Chan |
| **Guan Yu** | **Cao Pi*** | Gan Ning | Dong Zhuo |
| **Huang Zhong** | Cao Ren | Huang Gai | Lu Bu |
| Jiang Wei | **Dian Wei** | **Ling Tong*** | Meng Huo |
| Liu Bei | Pang De* | Lu Meng | Yuan Shao |
| **Ma Chao** | Sima Yi | **Lu Xun** | Zhang Jiao |
| Pang Tong | **Xiahou Dun** | Sun Ce | Zhu Rong |
| Wei Yan | Xiahou Yuan | Sun Jian | Zuo Ci* |
| **Xing Cai*** | Xu Huang | **Sun Quan** | |
| Yue Ying | **Xu Zhu** | **Sun Shang Xiang** | |
| **Zhang Fei** | Zhang He | **Taishi Ci** | |
| **Zhao Yun** | **Zhang Liao** | Xiao Qiao | |
| Zhuge Liang | **Zhen Ji** | Zhou Tai | |
| | | **Zhou Yu** | |

== Expansions ==
=== Dynasty Warriors 5: Xtreme Legends ===
Dynasty Warriors 5: Xtreme Legends (真・三國無双4: 猛将伝) is a minor expansion to Dynasty Warriors 5. This game was released in September 15, 2005 in Japan and on November 16, 2005 in North America and is playable only on the PlayStation 2 video game console.

It brought back Xtreme Mode and Legend Mode from Dynasty Warriors 4: Xtreme Legends, and introduced Destiny Mode.

Xtreme Mode, in which the objective of the game is for the human-controlled character to survive as long as possible while collecting gold dropped by enemies to regain health and increase stats temporarily.

In Destiny Mode, the player creates a custom character before being asked to join the Kingdom of Shu, Wei and Wu. While in this mode, you start out as a basic soldier with very few attacks (starting off with only two fundamental hits) and will be "protected" by a chosen officer near the character. The officer will heal the character continuously when injured during battle, so long as the character is nearby. A unique feature of Destiny Mode is that at times the player is given the option to betray one force, while setting a ruse for another. For example, a player receives a letter from Cao Cao, the King of Wei, in which he asks the player to defect from the Kingdom of Wu to the Kingdom of Wei. If the player defers the offer to switch sides their commander may approach them in the hopes of creating a ruse to destroy the opposing force. If the player chooses to accept the option from their commander they will fight for the other side temporarily. When the time is right their original commander will have them move the opposing commander to a set position which will trigger their ruse and supporting units will ambush the opposing commander to support the player's defection.

=== Shin Sangokumusou 4: Special ===
Shin Sangokumusou 4: Special (真・三國無双4: Special) is another expansion to the game. This game was released on December 22, 2006 on the Xbox 360 and Microsoft Windows in Japan and shortly thereafter for Windows in Taiwan, and was not released outside Japan and Taiwan.

This version combines the original game with some Xtreme Legends features, including Legend Mode and Xtreme Mode. It does not include Edit Mode or Destiny Mode, but it does include the new items from Xtreme Legends. It includes gamepad support, allowing users to use PlayStation 2- or Xbox 360-style controllers compatible with Windows. It has real-time shadows, better textures, and in widescreen the Taiwanese version has English voice as an option

The Windows version is in 4:3 and also has the Dynasty Warriors 4 outfits.

=== Dynasty Warriors 5: Empires ===
Dynasty Warriors 5: Empires (真・三國無双4: Empires) is the second Dynasty Warriors Empires expansion by Omega Force of Koei. Dynasty Warriors 5: Empires was released on March 28, 2006 for both the PlayStation 2 and Xbox 360 video game consoles.

This game is focused upon strategy game play. In Empire Mode, which features five new stages not in Dynasty Warriors 5, the player initially enacts various policies within a chosen state by consulting with the state's officers and delegating responsibilities to others. Battle tactics can be discussed, a feature of other titles in the strategy genre, such as Romance of the Three Kingdoms.

Other than Empire Mode, new items and weapons are introduced. Another new feature is the ability of being able to order non player officers to group, attack, or defend certain areas of the battlefield and choose which specific officer you wish to carry out these feats. Time limits can also be altered to fit your needs, also special tactics can be used to turn the tides of battle.

In addition to the original Dynasty Warriors 5 soundtrack, this expansion adds soundtracks from previous titles, including Dynasty Warriors 2, Dynasty Warriors 3 and Dynasty Warriors 4.

== Stage ==
Many of the battles from the previous game return. Several battles that previously had only one stage shared by all factions now have faction-specific stages, such as the Battle of Xi Liang and the Battle of Ji Province for the Yellow Turban Rebellion, and a fourth version of Nan Zhong for the Nanman. Other new battles include Escape from Chibi, the Battle of Tian Shui, and the Battle of Bai Di Castle.

== Trading Card Game ==
Koei published a series of trading card game (「真・三國無双 4」トレーディングカードゲーム) based on Dynasty Warriors 5 in 2005-7-29. The cards are illustrated by Hiroyuki Suwahara. Starter box (53 cards) cost 1500 yen, while booster pack (10 cards) cost 280 yen.

Available starter box including Wei set, Wu set, Shu set.

There are total 266 cards in the game, including 36 commander, 160 general, 35 strategy, 15 trap, 20 item. Booster pack include 10 cards from the set of 266.

== Reception ==
Dynasty Warriors 5

Aggregate score
| Aggregator | Score | |
| Aggregator | PS2 | Xbox |
|---|---|---|
| Metacritic | 69/100 | 66/100 |

Review scores
| Publication | Score | |
| Publication | PS2 | Xbox |
|---|---|---|
| Edge | 5/10 | N/A |
| Electronic Gaming Monthly | 7.83/10 | N/A |
| Eurogamer | 5/10 | N/A |
| Game Informer | 7/10 | 6/10 |
| GamePro | 3.5/5 | 3.5/5 |
| GameSpot | 6.8/10 | 6.6/10 |
| GameSpy | 2.5/5 | 2/5 |
| GameZone | 7.5/10 | 7.2/10 |
| IGN | 7.7/10 | 7.7/10 |
| Official U.S. PlayStation Magazine | 3.5/5 | N/A |
| Official Xbox Magazine (US) | N/A | 7/10 |
| PALGN | 7.5/10 | N/A |

Dynasty Warriors 5 received "mixed or average" reviews according to video game review aggregator Metacritic. a common complaint was that it was the as same as the other games

=== Xtreme Legends ===
Dynasty Warriors 5: Xtreme Legends

Aggregate score
| Aggregator | Score |
|---|---|
| Metacritic | 57/100 |

Review scores
| Publication | Score |
|---|---|
| Eurogamer | 6/10 |
| Game Informer | 6.75/10 |
| GameSpot | 6.3/10 |
| GameSpy | 2/5 |
| GameZone | 6.6/10 |
| IGN | 5.2/10 |
| Official U.S. PlayStation Magazine | 3/5 |
| PALGN | 4/10 |

Dynasty Warriors 5: Xtreme Legends received "mixed or average" reviews according to video game review aggregator Metacritic.

=== Empires ===
Dynasty Warriors 5: Empires

Aggregate score
| Aggregator | Score | |
| Aggregator | PS2 | Xbox 360 |
|---|---|---|
| Metacritic | 62/100 | 61/100 |

Review scores
| Publication | Score | |
| Publication | PS2 | Xbox 360 |
|---|---|---|
| Electronic Gaming Monthly | N/A | 4.83/10 |
| Eurogamer | 5/10 | N/A |
| Famitsu | 32/40 | 34/40 |
| Game Informer | 6/10 | 6/10 |
| GamePro | 3.5/5 | 3.5/5 |
| GameSpot | 7.2/10 | 7.1/10 |
| GameSpy | N/A | 3/5 |
| GameTrailers | 6.5/10 | 6.5/10 |
| GameZone | 6.7/10 | 6.5/10 |
| IGN | 5.3/10 | 5/10 |
| Official Xbox Magazine (US) | N/A | 7.5/10 |
| PALGN | 7/10 | N/A |
| The Times | N/A | 3/5 |

Dynasty Warriors 5: Empires received "mixed or average" reviews according to video game review aggregator Metacritic. In Japan, Famitsu gave it a score of one nine, two eights, and one nine for the Xbox 360 version, and all four eights for the PS2 version.
