= Lady Sun =

3rd-century Chinese noble lady

Lady Sun 孫夫人
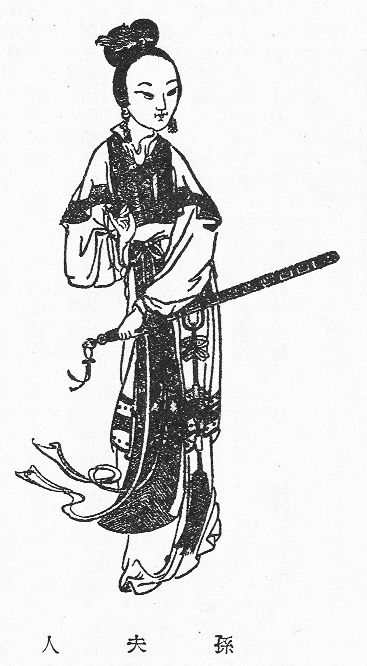
- A Qing dynasty illustration of Lady Sun
- Born: between 182 and 191 (Note: Although Lady Sun's birth year was not recorded, she was younger than her brother Sun Quan, who was born in 182/183. At the same time, she was not noted to be a posthumous child of her father Sun Jian, who most probably died in 191.)
- Died: Unknown (Note: Although Lady Sun's death year was not recorded, it should be in 211 or after, after her return to Wu.)
- Spouse: Liu Bei
- House: House of Sun
- Father: Sun Jian
- Mother: Unknown (Note: It is not recorded which of the three daughters of Sun Jian was also the daughter of Lady Wu, although Lady Sun's unbridled behaviour during her marriage, along with her many servants and Sun Quan having a ship sent to bring her back to Wu may have been more fitting of a child born to a primary wife rather than a concubine.)

Lady Sun (fl.180s – 211), also known as Sun Ren in the 14th-century historical novel Romance of the Three Kingdoms and Sun Shangxiang (Note: See this section for details.) in Chinese opera and modern popular culture, was a Chinese noblewoman who lived during the late Eastern Han dynasty. She was a daughter of the warlord Sun Jian, and her (known) older brothers were the warlords Sun Ce and Sun Quan, who founded the state of Eastern Wu in the Three Kingdoms period. Sometime in 209, she married the warlord Liu Bei to strengthen an alliance between Liu Bei and Sun Quan. Around 211, she returned to Sun Quan's domain when Liu Bei left Jing Province (covering present-day Hubei and Hunan) and settled in Yi Province (covering present-day Sichuan and Chongqing).

== Life ==
Lady Sun was the daughter of Sun Jian; her mother's identity is not recorded. She had four brothers who were born to Lady Wu – Sun Ce, Sun Quan, Sun Yi and Sun Kuang. Her personal name was not recorded in history. Also, the birth order of her and her brothers Sun Yi and Sun Kuang is unknown.

During 209, Lady Sun married the warlord Liu Bei to strengthen an alliance between Liu Bei and Sun Quan. The marriage probably took place at Gong'an County because it was the provincial capital of Jing Province and Liu Bei was nominally serving as the provincial governor at the time. (Note: Liu Bei's biography in the Sanguozhi mentioned that Sun Quan feared Liu Bei's influence after the latter became the Governor of Jing Province, so he arranged a marriage between his sister and Liu Bei. Sun Quan's biography in the Sanguozhi stated that Liu Bei became the Governor of Jing Province in the 14th year of Jian'an (209), so Lady Sun most probably married Liu Bei in 209.) Lady Sun was known to be talented and bright. She was also bold and extremely fierce in character, with a personality reminiscent of her elder brothers. She had more than a hundred female servants who carried swords and stood guard outside her room. Liu Bei was also suspicious and fearful of Lady Sun. Liu Bei's adviser Zhuge Liang once said: "When our lord [Liu Bei] was in Gong'an, he dreaded Cao Cao's influence in the north and feared Sun Quan's presence in the east. Even in home territory he was afraid that Lady Sun would cause trouble." In 211, Fa Zheng was sent by Liu Zhang to form an alliance with Liu Bei against the future threat posed by Cao Cao in Hanzhong. While he was in Jing Province, he met Lady Sun, who left quite an impression on him since he urged Liu Bei to have her sent back to Wu.

Lady Sun saw herself as the sister of a powerful warlord, and not only acted in an arrogant, unbridled manner, but also allowed her bodyguards and personal staff to behave lawlessly in Jing Province. For this reason, Liu Bei specially appointed his general Zhao Yun, whom he deemed a serious and conscientious person, to oversee domestic affairs in Jing Province and maintain law and order. Around 211, Liu Bei left Jing Province on a campaign to attack the warlord Liu Zhang in Yi Province while Lady Sun remained behind in Jing Province. When Sun Quan heard that Liu Bei had travelled to Yi Province, he sent a ship to fetch her. Lady Sun attempted to bring Liu Bei's son Liu Shan (who was born to Liu Bei's other wife, Lady Gan) with her to Sun Quan's territory. However, Zhao Yun and Zhang Fei, another of Liu Bei's generals, led their men to intercept her along the way and to retrieve Liu Shan. Nothing was recorded in history about what happened to Lady Sun after she returned home.

== Family tree ==
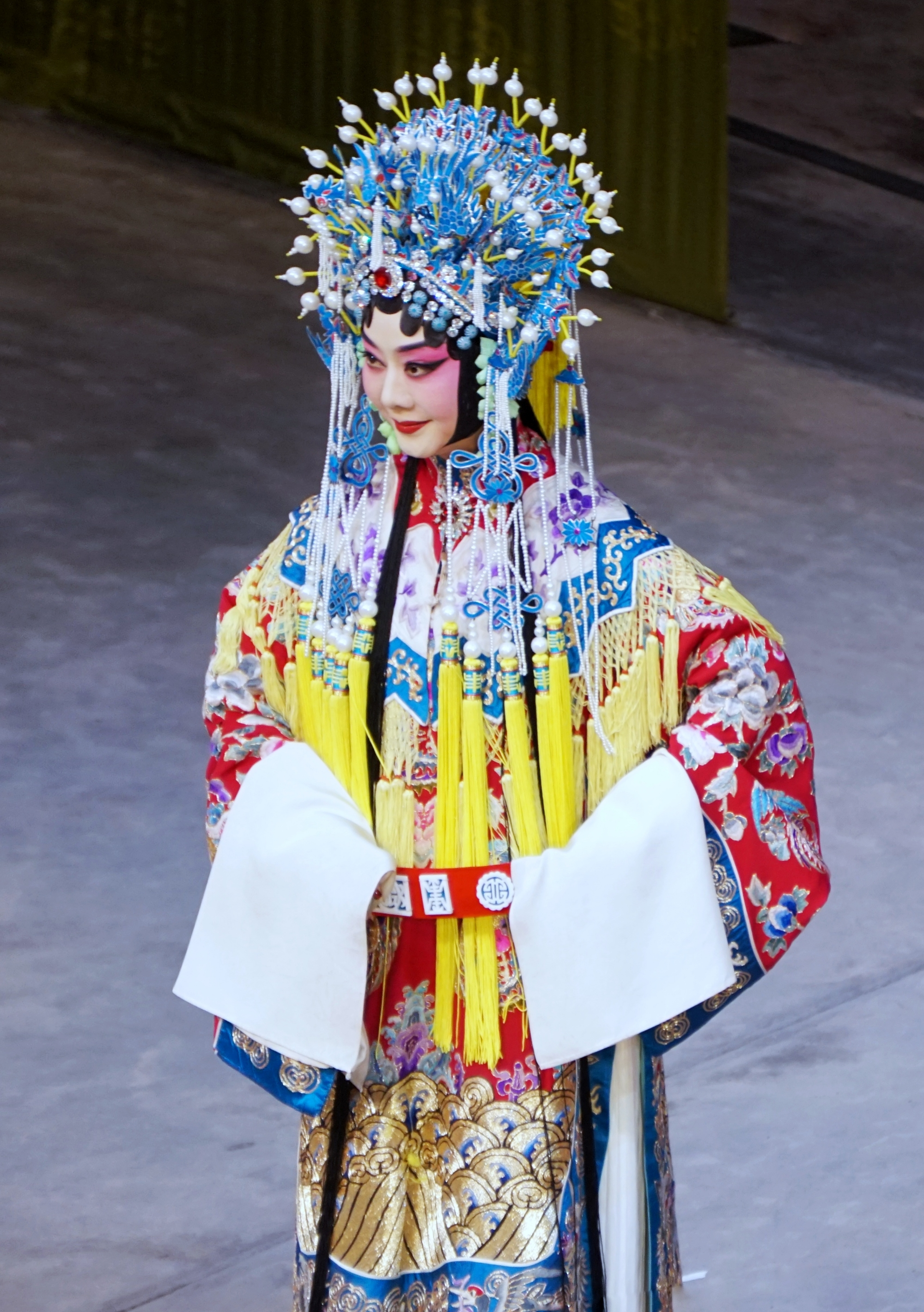
Peking opera star Li Shengsu as Sun Shangxiang, Beijing, 4 January 2020.

== Names ==
Other names of Lady Sun include:

- Sun Ren (孙仁; 孫仁; Sūn Rén; Sun Jen), in the 14th-century historical novel Romance of the Three Kingdoms.
- Sun Shangxiang (孙尚香; 孫尚香; Sūn Shàngxiāng; Sun Shang-hsiang), in drama and popular culture.
- Xiao Ji (枭姬; 梟姬; Xiāo Jī; Hsiao Chi; 'fierce lady'), nickname in popular culture.
- Gongyao Ji (弓腰姬; Gōngyāo Jī; Kung-yao Chi; 'lady with a waist like a bow'), nickname in the Japanese translation of Romance of the Three Kingdoms by Eiji Yoshikawa.

== In Romance of the Three Kingdoms ==
Lady Sun appears as a character in the 14th-century historical novel Romance of the Three Kingdoms, which romanticizes the historical events before and during the Three Kingdoms period. Her name was Sun Ren (孫仁) in the novel, which depicts her as a fiery, determined woman skilled in martial arts. Fictitious events in the novel include her betrothal to Liu Bei being part of Zhou Yu's scheme and her subsequent suicide when she heard false news of his death.

== In popular culture ==
Lady Sun is a playable character in Koei's Dynasty Warriors video game series. She also appears in Warriors Orochi, a crossover between Dynasty Warriors and Samurai Warriors. She is referred to as "Sun Shang Xiang" in the first seven installments of the series, and as "Sun Shangxiang" from the eighth installment onwards.

In Koei's Kessen 2 she is named "Sun Li" and is one of Liu Bei's many love interests.

Chinese actress Zhao Wei portrayed Sun Shangxiang in the 2008 Chinese epic war film Red Cliff directed by John Woo. In the first part, she and her all-female bodyguards lure Cao Cao's troops into an ambush. In the second part, she infiltrates Cao Cao's camp and draws a map of the enemy formation.

Lady Sun was portrayed by Pets Tseng in the 2009 Taiwanese idol drama series K.O.3an Guo, which spoofs Romance of the Three Kingdoms in a present-day high school setting. In the drama, Sun is the love interest of Xiu, who is the Iron Dimension counterpart of Liu Bei.

In the game Total War: Three Kingdoms she is named Sun Ren. Initially appearing as a child in the family tree of Sun Jian's campaign, Sun Ren becomes a playable character later in the game when she is an adult.

== See also ==
- Lists of people of the Three Kingdoms
