= List of video game soundtracks released on CD =

The practice of releasing video game soundtracks on compact disc began in the 1980s. CDs began to decline in the 2000s as they were replaced by other lossy-compressed audio formats such as MP3. Despite the decline, video game soundtracks continued to be released on CD and included in game collectors' editions. In the 2010s, successful indie games such as Undertale included physical collector's editions featuring their own video game soundtracks on CDs.

== History ==
The earliest CD recordings of video game music date back to the 1980s. Koichi Sugiyama was an early figure in this practice, and following the release of the first Dragon Quest game in 1986, the Tokyo Strings Ensemble released a live performance CD of his compositions. Haruomi Hosono released the first generally recognized video game soundtrack album, Video Game Music, and the practice experienced its "golden age" in the mid-to-late 1980s with hundreds of releases including Buckner & Garcia's Pac-Man Fever, Namco's Video Game Graffiti, and Koichi Sugiyama's orchestral covers of the Dragon Quest series. By the early 1990s, compact discs (CDs) were gaining traction as a storage medium for music and video games. By 1987, Sega was selling 50,000 to 100,000 game soundtrack CDs annually. NEC had been the first to use CD technology in a video game console with its PC Engine CD-ROM² System add-on in October 1988 in Japan (launched in North America as the TurboGrafx-CD the following year), which sold 80,000 units in six months.

Games could include high-quality pre-recorded audio because of CD-ROM technology, introduced in the early to mid 1990s. Before this, video game music was made using the programmable sound generator (PSG) by the console's sound chips using techniques such as FM synthesis or wavetable synthesis, creating a "chiptune" sound. Albums of this music did exist. They were often re-recorded or rearranged versions. The CD-ROM supported "Redbook audio," the standard for CDs to be played directly from the game disc. The CD-ROM had a lot of storage capacity. This allowed game scores to be as varied and complete as scores. With improvements in CD technology, games can now feature live-recorded music, licensed songs, full voice acting, and high-quality sound effects. Some popular early CD-ROM games, like The 7th Guest, featured impressive high-resolution graphics and live-recorded music. The advantage of CD-ROM technology was that composers could now use live instruments, vocals, and dialogue, and composers could be confident about how their music would sound on hardware, since the influence of a soundcard's synthesis decreased significantly. However, the downside was the capacity space. A CD could hold 72 minutes of uncompressed Redbook audio, however, this space had to be shared with the game's other data. CD audio naturally led to the possibility of selling the game's music as a separate product. Many video games have featured a commercially released soundtrack, such as Super Mario World, Killer Cuts, (Note: Killer Cuts is an arranged soundtrack CD featuring original music from Killer Instinct) and Tempest 2000. The music in Tempest 2000 was made by Ian Howe of Imagitec Design. The game's soundtrack of the game was popular enough to be released as a separate CD.

The trend was rising when 32-bit home consoles, such as the Sega Saturn becoming popular in Japan and the Sony PlayStation. These systems used the CD-ROM format, which made Redbook audio a standard feature. The PlayStation's CD drive could also play music CDs. Some games, like Final Fantasy VII, with its video game soundtrack by Nobuo Uematsu, used MIDI-based music instead. This was done to free up processing power for graphics and allow for a more dynamic score. The four hours of music from Final Fantasy VII were later released on a four-CD set. The sale of video game soundtracks has created a growing symbiotic relationship between the music and the video game industry. After Redbook audio came out, people started to like music that was already made. The earliest example of this is the game Wipeout XL for the PlayStation. It had music from groups like The Chemical Brothers, Underworld, and Daft Punk. Sony has done a cross-promotion for the game by delivering the soundtrack and PlayStation consoles to well-known DJs. Commonly, games are used to promote and sell licensed music, rather than original scores, and recording artists are used to market and sell games. Music marketing agency Electric Artists conducted a study that revealed a number of interesting statistics surrounding "hard-core gamers" and their music habits: 40% of hard-core gamers bought the CD after hearing a song they liked in a video game, 73% of gamers said soundtracks within games help sell more CDs, and 40% of respondents said a game introduced them to a new band or song, then 27% of them went out and bought what they heard. Selling video game soundtracks on CDs has become increasingly popular in the video game industry. Interpretive albums, remixes, and live performance recordings were also popular variations of original soundtracks (OSTs). In Japan, video game music reaches the top of sales charts. Some game soundtracks have become so popular that they have reached platinum status, such as NBA Live 2003.

In the 2000s, as digital music and internet-based distribution of lossy-compressed audio formats such as MP3 grew in popularity, CD sales began to decline. Despite the decline, by the mid-2010s, the practice of producing video game soundtracks on CDs and vinyl records experienced a resurgence, driven by successful Indie games such as Undertale. Amidst the growth, the vinyl revival was happening in another physical format, becoming immensely popular. Music from video games was helping to make vinyl records popular. The company Iam8bit started that year. It was the first company to only make video game music on vinyl records. Since then, iam8bit has sold more than 200,000 albums, including Cuphead, Persona 5, and Undertale, all of which were very popular, and reached the top of the Billboard 200 charts. The companies that made these records like Iam8bit, Mondo, Data Discs, and Fangamer made them special by creating and adding custom art as well as focusing on the visuals. Noah Lane, who is in charge of licensing at Fangamer, said, "We recognize that many soundtracks will remain unopened, so we strive to create a product that's worthy of being displayed in someone's home. A good example is our most recent release of Deltarune Chapter 1, designed by Ade. They made tons of gorgeous new art just for the vinyl, with lots of fun references to the game all throughout. It is absolutely worthy of framing and hanging on a wall." Iam8bit's approach aligns with this sentiment, treating video game vinyl as a highly collectible item.

Although CDs were not directly a part of the vinyl revival, the vinyl revival of the 2010s through the present day was itself inspired by younger music buyers' interest in video games. Conversely, CDs continue to outsell records by a significant margin as of 2022. A 2025 article in The Washington Post reported that CD sales and interest are steady and, in some cases, growing. Online marketplace Discogs saw an 8% rise in CD purchases and a 47% increase in users adding CDs to their wish lists. Experts think younger people like CDs because they seem fashionable and fun, and they want to truly own their media in a time of short-term streaming. They also like the hands-on experience of using a format. This caused a desire for a connection to music. Like reading notes, showing off collections, and doing an "offline ritual”. This helped boost CD production, including in the video game industry. Video game music retailers like Fangamer have pursued and produced CDs and vinyl records of video game soundtracks, often for indie games. The soundtrack for the critically acclaimed indie game Undertale was released on CD as part of a limited physical collector's edition, which is the strategy that became common for other successful indie games to release their own video game soundtracks on a CD, such as Celeste, Stardew Valley, Hades, and many more. CDs can also be an alternative to vinyl records, as CD prices are generally lower and more budget-friendly. CDs are easier for consumers or collectors of music soundtracks to purchase. CDs remain a valued physical media format for video game collectors and fans.

== Soundtrack albums ==
=== 1990s–2010s ===
Rel.	OST Title	Game title	Label	Notes	Ref(s)
1990	Dragon Quest IV Symphonic Suite	Dragon Quest IV	Sony Records	Performance by the London Philharmonic Orchestra.	
1991	Super Mario World Official Soundtrack	Super Mario World	Warner Music Japan	2-CD set.	
1994	Tempest 2000: The Soundtrack	Tempest 2000			
1995	Killer Cuts	Killer Instinct			
1996	The Dig	The Dig	Angel Records	Rearranged for standalone listening experience.	
1996	Wipeout 2097: The Soundtrack	Wipeout 2097	Virgin Records	Features music from The Chemical Brothers and The Prodigy.	
1997	FINAL FANTASY VII Original Soundtrack	Final Fantasy VII		4-CD set.	
1997	Outlaws: Original Music Soundtrack	Outlaws	LucasArts		
1997	この世の果てで恋を唄う少女 YU-NO Original Sound & Voice Collection	YU-NO: A Girl Who Chants Love at the Bound of this World	élf	Based on the Sega Saturn port's music.	
1997	この世の果てで恋を唄う少女 YU-NO Super Sound Track	YU-NO: A Girl Who Chants Love at the Bound of this World	élf	Enhanced rearrangements.	
1998	Grim Fandango Original Game Soundtrack	Grim Fandango	LucasArts	Score by Peter McConnell, performed live.	
1999	Medal of Honor Original Soundtrack Recording	Medal of Honor	Sony Music	Fully live orchestral score by Michael Giacchino.	
2002	Final Fantasy 20020220	Final Fantasy		2-CD live recording of the Tokyo Philharmonic performing music from Final Fantasy I–X.	
2003	NBA Livestyle 2003	NBA Live 2003	Priority/EMI	First video game soundtrack certified Platinum by the RIAA, selling over 1 million units.	
2004	Republic: The Revolution – Original Soundtrack	Republic: The Revolution		Score by James Hannigan performed by a Slovak orchestra.	
2008	Super Mario Galaxy Original Soundtrack	Super Mario Galaxy	Nintendo of Japan	CD can be available in a 1-CD or a 2-CD set featuring an orchestral score. Only exclusive to Club Nintendo members.	
2000	Tomorrow Never Dies: The Original Soundtrack from the Videogame	Tomorrow Never Dies	Chapter III Records		
2000	The Sims (Original Soundtrack)	The Sims	EA Records		
2001	Metal Gear Solid 2: Sons of Liberty (Original Soundtrack)	Metal Gear Solid 2: Sons of Liberty	Konami		
2003	Silent Hill 3 (Original Soundtrack)	Silent Hill 3	Konami		
2004	Halo 2 (Original Soundtrack) Volume One	Halo 2	Sumthing Else Music Works		
2007	Eclipse "The Album": Ryu Umemoto Rare Tracks Vol.1	Eclipse: Zettai Reido Keikaku Soushitsu Shoujo	EGG Music Records		
2008	Desire "The Origin": Ryu Umemoto Rare Tracks Vol.2	Desire	EGG Music Records		
2008	Xenon "The Origin": Ryu Umemoto Rare Tracks Vol.3	Xenon: Mugen no Shitai	EGG Music Records		
2008	EVE Burst Error "The Perfect": Ryu Umemoto Rare Tracks Vol.4	EVE Burst Error	EGG Music Records		
2008	Grounseed "The Origin" Ryu Umemoto & Ryu Takami Rare Tracks Special	Grounseed	EGG Music Records		

=== 2011–2014 ===
Rel.	OST Title	Game title	Label	Notes	Ref(s)
2011	Radiant Historia Music CD	Radiant Historia	Atlus		
2011	Batman: Arkham City – The Album (Original Soundtrack)	Batman: Arkham City	WaterTower Music	Features 12 tracks of licensed rock and alternative music featured in the game, including artists such as Panic! at the Disco, Coheed and Cambria, and Serj Tankian.	
2011	Halo: Combat Evolved Anniversary Soundtrack	Halo: Combat Evolved	Sumthing Else Music Works	2-CD set featuring new orchestrations of the classic Halo soundtrack by Martin O'Donnell and Michael Salvatori, created in celebration of the 10th anniversary.	
2014	Transistor Original Soundtrack	Transistor	Supergiant Games		
2014	Destiny Original Soundtrack	Destiny	Bungie Music Publishing	2+ hour orchestral soundtrack featuring live recordings.	

=== 2015 ===
Rel.	OST Title	Game title	Label	Notes	Ref(s)
2015	Bloodborne Original Soundtrack	Bloodborne	Sumthing Else Music Works		
2015	Broken Age (Original Soundtrack)	Broken Age	Sumthing Else Music Works	Score by Peter McConnell, featuring performances by the Melbourne Symphony Orchestra.	
2015	Halo 5: Guardians Original Soundtrack	Halo 5: Guardians	Microsoft	Limited Edition with 2 CDs.	
2015	Far Cry 4 Original Soundtrack	Far Cry 4	Invada Records	Released as a limited 2-CD edition with bonus material not included on the digital release.	
2015	Final Fantasy Type-0 HD Collector's Edition Soundtrack	Final Fantasy Type-0 HD	Square Enix Music		
2015	Assassin's Creed Revelations: The Complete Recordings	Assassin's Creed: Revelations	Sumthing Else Music Works	3-CD set.	
2015	Assassin's Creed IV: Black Flag	Assassin's Creed IV: Black Flag	Sumthing Else Music Works		
2015	Assassin's Creed Unity Volumes 1 & 2	Assassin's Creed Unity	Sumthing Else Music Works	Two separate CD volumes.	
2015	Nuclear Throne Official Soundtrack	Nuclear Throne	Vlambeer		
2015	Splatoon ORIGINAL SOUNDTRACK -Splatune-	Splatoon	KADOKAWA	2-CD set.	
2015	Street Fighter II (Generation Series)	Street Fighter II	Brave Wave Productions	Remastered re-release of the classic soundtrack.	

=== 2016 ===
Rel.	OST Title	Game title	Composer(s)	Label	Notes	Ref(s)
2016	ABZÛ – Original Game Soundtrack	Abzû	Austin Wintory	Varèse Sarabande		
2016	Axiom Verge (Original Soundtrack)	Axiom Verge	Thomas Happ Games			
2016	DETERMINATION: THE PURPLE SIDE	Undertale	Toby Fox		CD of a cover album by RichaadEB and AceWaters.	
2016	Gears of War 4 - The Soundtrack	Gears of War 4	Ramin Djawadi	Sumthing Else Music Works		
2016	No Man's Sky: Music for an Infinite Universe	No Man's Sky	65daysofstatic	Laced Records	2-CD set featuring the original score by UK instrumental band 65daysofstatic.	
2016	Shantae: Half-Genie Hero Risky Beats Edition Soundtrack	Shantae: Half-Genie Hero	Jake Kaufman	XSEED Games		
2016	The Legend of Zelda: Twilight Princess HD Original Soundtrack	The Legend of Zelda: Twilight Princess HD	Toru Minegishi, Asuka Ota	Nintendo	3-CD set.	
2016	Street Fighter V Original Soundtrack	Street Fighter V	Capcom Sound Team	Capcom	2-CD set.	
2016	Undertale: Determination	Undertale	Toby Fox		2-CD set of a cover album.	

=== 2017 ===
Rel.	OST Title	Game title	Composer(s)	Label	Notes	Ref(s)
2017	Hakoboy! Complete Music Collection	BoxBoy!	Jun Ishikawa, Hirokazu Ando			
2017	Halo Wars 2 Original Soundtrack	Halo Wars 2	Gordy Haab, Brian Lee White, Brian Trifon	Sumthing Else Music Works	2-CD set featuring over two hours of original music.	
2017	Pyre (Original Soundtrack)	Pyre	Darren Korb		2-CD set.	
2017	UNDERTALE Original Soundtrack	Undertale	Toby Fox	Materia Collective	2-CD; can be obtained separately or as a collector's edition.	
2017	Valkyria Revolution (Limited Edition Bonus CD)	Valkyria Revolution	Yasunori Mitsuda	Sega	Limited Edition physical copies of the game included a bonus CD featuring 12 selected tracks. The full soundtrack was recorded by the Tokyo Symphony Orchestra.	
2017	Yooka-Laylee (Music From The Video Game)	Yooka-Laylee	Grant Kirkhope, David Wise, and Steve Burke.	Laced Records	CD presented in a deluxe gatefold sleeve. Includes 28 original tracks plus 10 bonus tracks of variant compositions.	

=== 2018 ===
Rel.	OST Title	Game title	Composer(s)	Label	Notes	Ref(s)
2018	Stardew Valley Official Soundtrack	Stardew Valley	ConcernedApe		2-CD set.	
2018	The Legend of Zelda: Breath of the Wild Original Soundtrack	The Legend of Zelda: Breath of the Wild	Manaka Kataoka, Yasuaki Iwata, Hajime Wakai	Nintendo	5-CD limited edition box set released in Japan.	
2018	DOOM (Original Game Soundtrack)	DOOM	Mick Gordon	Laced Records	2-CD deluxe edition in triple gatefold sleeve featuring all 31 tracks from the game by composer Mick Gordon.	
2018	ARMORED CORE ORIGINAL SOUNDTRACK 20th ANNIVERSARY BOX	Armored Core	FromSoftware		20-CD comprehensive box set commemorating 20 years of the ''Armored Core'' series.	
2018	Ni no Kuni II: Revenant Kingdom Original Soundtrack	Ni no Kuni II: Revenant Kingdom	Joe Hisaishi	Wayô Records		
2018	MUSICエンジン UNDERTALE CD Vol.1: Undyne	Undertale	Toby Fox	MUSIC ENGINE	CD arrangement of 6 soundtracks associated with Undyne.	
2018	MUSICエンジン UNDERTALE CD Vol.2: Toriel	Undertale	Toby Fox	MUSIC ENGINE	CD arrangement of 5 soundtracks associated with Toriel.	
2018	VA-11 HALL-A: Complete Sound Collection	VA-11 Hall-A	Michael Kelly	Black Screen Records	3-CD set.	

=== 2019 ===
Rel.	OST Title	Game title	Composer(s)	Label	Notes	Ref(s)
2019	Chrono Trigger Original Soundtrack Revival Disc	Chrono Trigger	Yasunori Mitsuda	Square Enix Music	2-CD set.	
2019	DELTARUNE Chapter 1 Soundtrack	Deltarune	Toby Fox	Materia Collective	CD also has a separate Japanese version.	
2019	Days Gone (Original Soundtrack)	Days Gone	Nathan Whitehead	Sony Music		
2019	Castle of Heart Soundtrack CD	Castle of Heart	7Levels	First Press Games	Standalone soundtrack CD released alongside physical game editions.	
2019	MUSICエンジン UNDERTALE CD Vol.3: Alphys & Mettaton	Undertale	Toby Fox	MUSIC ENGINE	CD arrangement of 7 soundtracks associated with Alphys and Mettaton.	
2019	MUSICエンジン UNDERTALE CD Vol. 4: Sans & Papyrus	Undertale	Toby Fox	MUSIC ENGINE	Orchestra arrangement CD of 8 soundtracks associated with Sans and Papyrus.	
2019	Samurai Shodown CD Soundtrack	Samurai Shodown	Yasuo Yamate	Wayô Records	2-CD set.	
2019	Space Channel 5 20th Anniversary GyunGyun Selection	Space Channel 5	Naofumi Hataya, Kenichi Tokoi	U/M/A/A	2-CD set.	

=== 2020 ===
Rel.	OST Title	Game title	Composer(s)	Label	Notes	Ref(s)
2020	Celeste Original Soundtrack 3-CD Set	Celeste	Lena Raine	Ship To Shore Phonograph Co.	3-CD set.	
2020	Sonic Wings -VIDEO SYSTEM ARCADE SOUND DIGITAL COLLECTION Vol.1	Sonic Wings	Naoki Itamura	Claris Disk / City Connection	3-CD set.	
2020	Death Stranding: Original Score	Death Stranding	Ludvig Forssell	Sony Music		
2020	Aground Original Game Soundtrack Deluxe Edition	Aground	Chase Bethea	Materia Collective		
2020	The Legend of Heroes: Hajimari no Kiseki Original Soundtrack	The Legend of Heroes: Hajimari no Kiseki	Falcom Sound Team jdk	Falcom	3-CD set.	
2020	Granblue Fantasy: Versus Original Soundtrack	Granblue Fantasy: Versus	Tsutomu Narita, Yasunori Nishiki	Cygames	2-CD set.	
2020	Haven (Original Game Soundtrack)	Haven	Danger	G4F Records		

=== 2021-2024 ===
Rel.	OST Title	Game title	Composer(s)	Label	Notes	Ref(s)
2021	A Total War Saga: TROY (Original Soundtrack)	A Total War Saga: Troy	Richard Beddow	Laced Records	2-CD set.	
2021	Disco Elysium (Original Soundtrack)	Disco Elysium	British Sea Power	Golden Chariot Records	Double CD release. Initially released digitally in December 2019, physical CDs followed in 2021.	
2021	MindSeize Original Soundtrack	MindSeize	Adam Al-Sawad	First Press Games	Standalone soundtrack CD released alongside the game's physical collector's edition.	
2021	NEO: The World Ends with You - Original Soundtrack	The World Ends with You	Shinji Hashimoto, Tetsuya Nomura, Hatao Ogata	Square Enix Music	3-CD set	
2021	Anointed Merit: Prelude	Deltarune	Toby Fox		Double EP cover album created by RichaadEB and Amie Waters.	
2022	Astroneer (Original Soundtrack)	Astroneer	Rutger Zuydervelt			
2022	DELTARUNE Chapter 2 Soundtrack	Deltarune	Toby Fox	Materia Collective		
2022	Hades: Original Soundtrack	Hades	Darren Korb			
2022	Sable (Original Video Game Soundtrack)	Sable	Japanese Breakfast	Sony Music	2-CD set.	
2022	Shin Megami Tensei III: Nocturne HD Remaster Original Soundtrack	Shin Megami Tensei III: Nocturne	Shoji Meguro, Kenichi Tsuchiya, Toshiki Konishi		2-CD set.	
2022	Final Fantasy XIV: Endwalker Original Soundtrack	Final Fantasy XIV: Endwalker	Masayoshi Soken	Square Enix Music		
2022	Triangle Strategy Original Soundtrack	Triangle Strategy	Akira Senju	Square Enix Music	4-CD set.	
2022	Stranger of Paradise: Final Fantasy Origin Original Soundtrack	Stranger of Paradise: Final Fantasy Origin	Naoshi Mizuta, Hidenori Iwasaki, Ryo Yamazaki, Takafumi Imamura	Square Enix Music	2-CD set.	
2022	Live A Live (HD-2D Remake) Original Soundtrack	Live A Live	Yoko Shimomura	Square Enix Music		
2022	Harvestella Original Soundtrack	Harvestella	Go Shiina	Square Enix Music		
2022	Hollow Knight Piano Collections CD Artbook	Hollow Knight	Christopher Larkin	Materia Collective	CD of piano renditions of the 15 Hollow Knight soundtracks.	
2022	Monster Hunter Rise Original Soundtrack	Monster Hunter Rise	Satoshi Hori	Capcom	3-CD set.	
2022	Sonic Frontiers Original Soundtrack Stillness and Motion	Sonic Frontiers	Tomoya Ohtani, Kenichi Tokoi, Takahito Eguchi, Rintaro Soma, Kenji Mizuno, Kanon Oguni, Hiroshi Kawaguchi	Wave Master	6-CD set.	
2022	UNDERTALE Piano Collections CD Artbook: Volume 1	Undertale	Toby Fox	Materia Collective	CD piano renditions of 15 Undertale's chosen soundtracks.	
2022	UNDERTALE Piano Collections CD Artbook: Volume 2	Undertale	Toby Fox	Materia Collective	CD piano renditions of 15 Undertale's chosen soundtracks.	
2022	You Are Filled With Determination	Undertale	Toby Fox		CD cover of 11 selected Undertale's soundtrack.	
2023	Horizon Forbidden West (Original Soundtrack)	Horizon Forbidden West	Joris De Man, Joe Henson, Alexis Smith, Niels van der Leest, Oleksa Lozowchuk	Sony Music	6-CD deluxe edition.	
2023	Octopath Traveler II Original Soundtrack	Octopath Traveler II	Yasunori Nishiki	Square Enix Music	6-CD set.	
2023	Forspoken Original Soundtrack	Forspoken	Garry Schyman	Square Enix Music		
2023	Tactics Ogre: Reborn Original Soundtrack	Tactics Ogre: Reborn	Hitoshi Sakimoto, Masaharu Iwata	Square Enix Music		
2023	Valkyrie Elysium Original Soundtrack	Valkyrie Elysium	Motoi Sakuraba	Square Enix Music		
2023	wipE'out" – The Zero Gravity Soundtrack	Wipeout	Tim Wright	Lapsus Records	Remastered and reissued on CD in 2023.	
2024	The Legend of Zelda: Tears of the Kingdom Original Soundtrack	The Legend of Zelda: Tears of the Kingdom	Manaka Kataoka, Maasa Miyoshi, Masato Ohashi, Tsukasa Usui	Nippon Colombia		
2024	Perfect Reflections - Sonic X Shadow Generations Original Soundtrack	Sonic X Shadow Generations	Jun Senoue	Wave Master	2-CD set.	

=== 2025 ===
Rel.	OST Title	Game title	Composer(s)	Label	Notes	Ref(s)
2025	MUSICエンジン UNDERTALE CD Vol. 5: Asgore & Flowey	Undertale	Toby Fox	MUSIC ENGINE	Orchestra arrangement CD of 8 soundtracks associated with Flowey or Asgore.	
2025	MUSICエンジン UNDERTALE CD Vol. 6: Asriel	Undertale	Toby Fox	MUSIC ENGINE	Orchestra arrangement CD of 9 soundtracks associated with Asriel.	
2025	ENA: Season 1 CD Soundtrack	ENA: Dream BBQ	ENA Team			
2025	Neva (Original Soundtrack)	Neva	Berlinist	Laced Records		
2025	Sonic Wings Reunion Original Soundtrack	Sonic Wings Reunion	Naoki Itamura	Clarice Disc	2-CD set.	
2025	DOOM: The Dark Ages Original Soundtrack	DOOM: The Dark Ages	Finishing Move	Laced Records	2-CD set.	
2025	Monster Hunter Wilds Original Soundtrack	Monster Hunter Wilds	Miwako Chinone	Capcom	7-CD set.	
2025	Silent Hill f CD - Original Video Game Soundtrack	Silent Hill f	Kensuke Inage, Akira Yamaoka	Konami	3-CD set.	
2025	Star Ocean: First Departure Original Soundtrack	Star Ocean: First Departure	Motoi Sakuraba	Square Enix Music	Released CD as the remastered version.	
2025	Toxic Crusaders (Original Game Soundtrack)	Toxic Crusaders	Shinji Amagishi	Retroware		

=== 2026 ===
Rel.	OST Title	Game title	Composer(s)	Label	Notes	Ref(s)
2026	Chrono Trigger: Melodies Across Time	Chrono Trigger	Yasunori Mitsuda	Square Enix Music	CD album featuring 10 orchestral arrangements recorded at the "CHRONO TRIGGER Orchestra Concert" in Tokyo.	
2026	Clair Obscur: Expedition 33 (Complete Edition)	Clair Obscur: Expedition 33	Lorien Testard, Alice Duport-Percier (Note: Singer and vocal composer)	Laced Records	154-track edition released on CD with bonus tracks on February 6, 2026. Vinyl edition (featuring selected tracks) debuted at No. 29 on the Billboard 200, marking the largest sales week for a game soundtrack on vinyl in the modern era since electronic tracking began in 1991.	
2026	Mouthwashing (Original Soundtrack)	Mouthwashing	Martin Halldin			
2026	Pokémon Legends: Z-A Complete Soundtrack	Pokémon Legends: Z-A (including Mega Dimension DLC)	Go Ichinose, Hitomi Sato, Junichi Masuda	The Pokémon Company	5-CD set. Includes music from the base game and the Mega Dimension DLC expansion launched in late 2025, plus past songs used in the games. Announced for Japan release on April 17, 2026.	
2026	Half-Life: Alyx (Original Soundtrack)	Half-Life: Alyx	Mike Morasky, Kelly Bailey	Ipecac Recordings	4-CD set.	
2026	UNDERTALE: CHITEI DE CHILL CD	Undertale	Toby Fox, Muro, tofubeats, VaVa, DJ Mitsu the Beats, grooveman Spot, doooo, DJ JIN, GORO KUMAI, G.RINA, and DJ HASEBE.	Square Enix Music	CD of a selected 20-track arrangement album, a 10th-anniversary collaboration.	
2026	UNDERTALE Piano Arrangement Album: Echoes Beneath CD	Undertale	Toby Fox, Yuki Kishida, Ryota Kikuchi, and Yui Morishita	Square Enix Music	CD of a selected 15-track piano rendition, a 10th-anniversary collaboration album.	

== Soundtrack compilations ==
Rel.	OST Title	Game title	Label	Notes	Ref(s)
2008	One Life Left Presents... Music To Play Games By	Monkey Island, Super Mario Bros., Gauntlet, Sonic the Hedgehog 2, Doom, Final Fantasy VII		Compilation of videogame-inspired music from 12 artists, limited to 1,000 copies.	
2011	The King of Fighters XIII: The King of Soundtracks '94-XIII	The King of Fighters XIII	Atlus	4-CD compilation featuring music from The King of Fighters '94 through XIII.	
2017	Diggin' In The Carts	Motocross Maniacs, Nemesis, Thunder Force IV	Hyperdub	Compilation album curated by Red Bull Music's "Diggin' In The Carts" presenter Nick Dwyer and Hyperdub label head Kode9.	
2020	Death Stranding: Songs from the Video Game	Death Stranding	Sony Music	CD compilation featuring licensed songs and bands prominently featured in the game. Released alongside the original score album.	
2019	SNK Arcade Sound Digital Collection Vol.4	Pulstar, Blazing Star	Claris Disk / City Connection	2-CD compilation set.	
2025	Piano Fantasies - music from SQUARE ENIX	Final Fantasy, Kingdom Hearts, Chrono Trigger, Secret of Mana	Square Enix Music	2-CD studio album.	
2012	Kirby's Dream Collection Special Edition Compilation Soundtrack	Kirby's Dream Land, Kirby's Adventure, Kirby's Dream Course, Kirby's Dream Land 2, Kirby Super Star, Kirby's Dream Land 3, Kirby 64: The Crystal Shards, Kirby: Nightmare in Dream Land, Kirby Air Ride, Kirby & the Amazing Mirror, Kirby: Canvas Curse, Kirby: Squeak Squad, Kirby Super Star Ultra, Kirby's Epic Yarn, Kirby Mass Attack, Kirby's Return to Dream Land		Compilation of Kirby game songs included in Kirby's Dream Collection.	
2015	The 30th Anniversary Super Mario Bros. Music also known as 30周年記念盤 スーパーマリオブラザーズ ミュージック	Super Mario Bros., Super Mario Bros. 3, Super Mario Land, Super Mario World, Super Mario Bros. 2, Super Mario Land 2: 6 Golden Coins, Super Mario 64, Super Mario Sunshine, New Super Mario Bros., Super Mario Galaxy, New Super Mario Bros. Wii, Super Mario Galaxy 2, Super Mario 3D Land, New Super Mario Bros. 2, New Super Mario Bros. U, Super Mario 3D World, Super Mario Maker	Nippon Columbia	Compilation of Mario songs sold for the series' 30th anniversary.	

== See also ==
- List of video game soundtracks released on vinyl
