= Super Mario Galaxy Original Soundtrack =

Soundtrack album by Mahito Yokota and Koji Kondo
- Released: 24 January 2008 (Japan) 30 October 2024 (Digital release on Nintendo Music)
- Studio: Nintendo EAD
- Genre: Video game soundtrack
- Length: Original Edition: 1:07:05; Platinum Edition: 2:09:54
- Label: Club Nintendo
- Producer: Nintendo

The Super Mario Galaxy Original Soundtrack is the soundtrack to the 2007 video game Super Mario Galaxy. It was released in Japan and Europe on January 31, 2008, and in the United States on October 31, 2011, exclusively to Club Nintendo members. There is a one-disc edition and a two-disc Platinum Version. The American version is called the Super Mario Galaxy Official Soundtrack, and it was released only in the regular edition. The regular edition has 28 music tracks, while the Platinum Version has all 81 music tracks from the game. 77 of the music tracks are composed by Mahito Yokota, and four by Koji Kondo. The Mario Galaxy Orchestra provided the soundtrack's orchestral performances.

The Platinum Version of the soundtrack is featured in Super Mario 3D All-Stars alongside the Super Mario Sunshine Original Soundtrack and Super Mario 64 Original Soundtrack. It was released digitally onto Nintendo Music on October 30, 2024, with an additional track known as "Good Night" being added in October 2025. On April 24, 2026, Nintendo surprise reissued the soundtrack onto Spotify for a limited time, to coincide with the franchise's 40th anniversary.

== Development ==
During development, Mahito Yokota, who was in charge of the musical direction, originally wanted Super Mario Galaxy to have a Latin American style of music, and even had composed 28 tracks in that style. Latin American percussion instruments had already been featured in previous Super Mario installments, such as steelpans, bongo drums, and congas. For Super Mario Galaxy's theme, Yokota used Latin American instruments and a synthesiser to replicate the sounds featured in old science fiction films. The composition was approved by Yoshiaki Koizumi, the game's director and designer, but when Yokota presented it to the game's sound supervisor, Koji Kondo, he stated that it was "no good". When asked why his music was rejected, Kondo responded: "if somewhere in your mind you have an image that Mario is cute, please get rid of it". Incensed by the rejection, Yokota almost resigned from his job, but Kondo implied that Mario's character was "cool" and instructed him to try again.

According to Yokota, he was under the impression that Mario was suited for children, causing him to create "cute" music that would appeal to the targeted audience. The game's director, Yoshiaki Koizumi, after Yokota's music was rejected, later complimented him telling him "It wasn't so bad". Three months later, Yokota presented three different styles of music to Miyamoto: one piece had an orchestral sound, the other had pop music, and the last featured a mix of both orchestral and pop music. Miyamoto chose the orchestral piece, as it sounded the most "space-like". Yokota stated that Miyamoto chose the piece without knowing that Kondo actually wrote it. In a retrospective interview, Satoru Iwata said that Miyamoto chose the music that sounded "space-like" because he was looking for a sound that would express the game, in contrast to the tropical sounds of Super Mario Bros. Yokota revealed that he initially struggled to create music that sounded like a Super Mario game, but as time progressed he declared that the songs he made for the game had "become natural".

To create a sense of variety with the soundtrack, Yokota and Kondo wrote pieces individually; Kondo composed five pieces for the game whereas Yokota composed the rest. Kondo composed the pieces that Yokota specifically requested, as he thought that the game's soundtrack would "end up all sounding the same" if it were composed by one person. The game originally heavily utilised the Wii Remote speaker for "all sorts of sound [effects]", but Masafumi Kawamura, the game's sound director, decided they were redundant when played in tandem with those from the television. Kawamura decided to restrict Wii Remote sound effects to those triggered by Mario's actions, such as hitting an enemy, feeling that it better immersed the player.

Yokota initially had concerns whether or not orchestral music would fit in with the rhythm of a Mario game, but thought that such music would make the scale of the game "seem more epic". Kondo, on the other hand, believed if orchestral music were used the player would be "obligated to play the game in time to the music". To synchronise the soundtrack to gameplay, Kawamura utilised similar techniques he used to synchronise sound effects in The Legend of Zelda: Wind Waker and Donkey Kong Jungle Beat – in which the game synchronises MIDI data with streaming data, resulting in sound effects playing at the same time as background music. To make synchronisation possible, the audio team requested the orchestra to perform at different tempos set with a metronome.

== Composition ==
The game's soundtrack features 28 orchestral songs performed by a 50-person symphony orchestra. A departure from the tropical, calypso-inspired sequenced music of Super Mario Sunshine, Super Mario Galaxy is a symphonic soundtrack whose orchestral arrangements incorporate a 50-piece ensemble, synthesized textures, and interactive tempo fluctuations, abandoning the strictly MIDI-based instrumentation that had defined the series' 3D predecessors. The compositions are characterized by sweeping string sections, heroic brass fanfares, and waltz-time rhythms, constituting a consistent "space opera" palette that stays faithful to the franchise's upbeat roots while introducing a grander, more cinematic scale. Several critics noted that the soundtrack also incorporates elements of big band, distinct synthesizer pop, and ambient music. In this regard, Koji Kondo, the series' sound supervisor, described the musical direction not as "cute," but as "cool," a distinction that led lead composer Mahito Yokota to discard his initial Latin-percussion drafts in favor of a majestic, orchestral approach.

In addition to the primary orchestral palette, many tracks incorporate stylings that evoke retro or contemporary genres such as march, waltz, and electronic ambience. "Egg Planet" incorporates elements of sci-fi synthesis and military march in its buzzing, synthesized bassline and driving percussion. The atmospheric, reverberating chimes of "Space Junk Road" resemble soundscapes used in ambient and minimalist music to convey the loneliness of the void. The strings, tympani, and woodwinds of "Gusty Garden Galaxy", "Battlerock Galaxy", and "Buoy Base Galaxy" evoke late-Romantic symphonies, with the former track further evoking high-adventure film scores with its soaring violin melody, syncopated brass accompaniment, and rapid chord progressions. Elements of intimate chamber music are demonstrated on "Luma", a delicate, slow-paced variation on the main theme absent of the bombastic percussion of the main courses; and "Family", a piano-driven waltz composed of sparse harmonies and gentle woodwind accents.

The score uses Golden Ratios as part of its composition. The composer Mahito Yokota stated that the use of a live orchestra was intended to expand the game's emotional range beyond simple cheerfulness to include grandeur and sadness.

== Release ==
Professional ratings
Review scores
Source	Rating
Pitchfork	8.8/10

The official soundtrack was released on 24 January 2008. It was initially an exclusive to Club Nintendo subscribers in Japan, although the soundtrack became available to European Club Nintendo members in November 2008. The soundtrack was released in two versions: the Original Soundtrack, which only contains 28 tracks from the game, and the Platinum Edition, which contains another 53 tracks on a second disc for a total of 81 tracks. In North America, the Original Soundtrack was included in a black Wii Family Edition console bundle alongside New Super Mario Bros. Wii in 2011.

Themes from the soundtrack were incorporated into The Super Mario Galaxy Movie soundtrack composed by Brian Tyler. On April 24, 2026, to coincide with the Mario franchise's 40th anniversary and the release of The Super Mario Galaxy Movie, Nintendo surprise reissued the soundtrack, along with that of Super Mario Galaxy 2, onto Spotify for a limited time, with an official playlist of both soundtracks totaling up to 130 songs; the reissue for Super Mario Galaxy is composed of 71 tracks. It was given the "Best New Reissue" designation by Pitchfork, who gave the soundtrack a score of 8.8 out of 10, with reviewer Billie Bugara contending that it "established both a newfound lexicon of splendor for the Super Mario series and set a cinematic benchmark for video-game scores going forward".

== Tracklist ==
Title	Length	Composer		
Title	Length	Overture	1:21	Mahito Yokota
The Star Festival	1:26	Mahito Yokota		
Attack of the Airships	1:18	Mahito Yokota		
Catastrophe	0:55	Mahito Yokota		
Peach’s Castle Stolen	0:32	Mahito Yokota		
Enter the Galaxy	1:24	Mahito Yokota		
Egg Planet	2:39	Koji Kondo		
Rosalina in the Observatory 1	2:25	Koji Kondo		
The Honeyhive	2:36	Mahito Yokota		
Space Junk Road	3:19	Mahito Yokota		
Battlerock Galaxy	3:18	Mahito Yokota		
Beach Bowl Galaxy	2:20	Mahito Yokota		
Rosalina in the Observatory 2	2:22	Koji Kondo		
Enter Bowser Jr.!	2:53	Mahito Yokota		
Waltz of the Boos	2:40	Mahito Yokota		
Buoy Base Galaxy	3:09	Mahito Yokota		
Gusty Garden Galaxy	3:42	Mahito Yokota		
Rosalina in the Observatory 3	2:42	Koji Kondo		
King Bowser	3:13	Mahito Yokota		
Melty Molten Galaxy	4:07	Mahito Yokota		
The Galaxy Reactor	2:25	Mahito Yokota		
Final Battle with Bowser	2:23	Mahito Yokota		
Daybreak - A New Dawn	0:54	Mahito Yokota		
Birth	1:54	Mahito Yokota		
Super Mario Galaxy	4:01	Mahito Yokota		
Purple Comet	3:01	Mahito Yokota		
Blue Sky Athletic	1:08	Mahito Yokota		
Super Mario 2007	2:19	Mahito Yokota		
File Select	0:51	Mahito Yokota		
Luma	0:54	Mahito Yokota		
Gateway Galaxy	2:00	Mahito Yokota		
Stolen Grand Star	0:33	Mahito Yokota		
To the Observatory Grounds 1	0:43	Mahito Yokota		
Observation Dome	1:56	Mahito Yokota		
Course Select	0:39	Mahito Yokota		
Dino Piranha	1:11	Mahito Yokota		
A Chance to Grab a Star!	0:53	Mahito Yokota		
A Tense Moment	0:39	Mahito Yokota		
Big Bad Bugaboom	1:56	Mahito Yokota		
King Kaliente	1:09	Mahito Yokota		
The Toad Brigade	0:39	Mahito Yokota		
Airship Armada	2:19	Mahito Yokota		
Aquatic Race	1:20	Mahito Yokota		
Space Fantasy	1:58	Mahito Yokota		
Megaleg	1:29	Mahito Yokota		
To the Observatory Grounds 2	0:28	Mahito Yokota		
Space Athletic	1:14	Mahito Yokota		
Speedy Comet	1:51	Mahito Yokota		
Beach Bowl Galaxy - Undersea	1:29	Mahito Yokota		
Interlude	0:35	Mahito Yokota		
Bowser’s Stronghold Appears	0:49	Mahito Yokota		
The Fiery Stronghold	2:09	Mahito Yokota		
The Big Staircase	0:34	Mahito Yokota		
Bowser Appears	0:30	Mahito Yokota		
Star Ball	1:02	Mahito Yokota		
The Library	0:56	Mahito Yokota		
Buoy Base Galaxy - Undersea	1:53	Mahito Yokota		
Rainbow Mario	0:29	Mahito Yokota		
Chase the Bunnies!	1:05	Mahito Yokota		
Help!	0:26	Mahito Yokota		
Major Burrows	0:53	Mahito Yokota		
Pipe Interior	0:42	Mahito Yokota		
Cosmic Comet	0:56	Mahito Yokota		
Drip Drop Galaxy	1:17	Mahito Yokota		
Kingfin	1:46	Mahito Yokota		
Boo Race	1:26	Mahito Yokota		
Ice Mountain	1:29	Mahito Yokota		
Ice Mario	0:28	Mahito Yokota		
Lava Path	1:29	Mahito Yokota		
Fire Mario	0:27	Mahito Yokota		
Dusty Dune Galaxy	3:02	Mahito Yokota		
Heavy Metal Mecha-Bowser	1:21	Mahito Yokota		
A-wa-wa-wa!	0:35	Mahito Yokota		
Deep Dark Galaxy	1:41	Mahito Yokota		
Kamella	1:23	Mahito Yokota		
Star Ball 2	0:40	Mahito Yokota		
Sad Girl	0:46	Mahito Yokota		
Flying Mario	1:09	Mahito Yokota		
Star Child	0:49	Mahito Yokota		
A Wish	0:39	Mahito Yokota		
Family	1:21	Mahito Yokota		
Good Night (From the Nintendo Switch version) (Note: Exclusive to the Nintendo Music release)	1:32	Mahito Yokota		
