= Megaleg =

Megaleg may refer to:

- Megaleg, a boss in the 2007 video game Super Mario Galaxy
- Mega leg, the name of a double-length leg in The Amazing Race
