= Sangokushi Sōsōden =

1998 video game

- Developer: Koei
- Publisher: Koei
- Composer: Mahito Yokota
- Platforms: Microsoft Windows, mobile phone
- Release: JP: December 11, 1998
- Genre: Tactical role-playing game
- Mode: Single player

Sangokushi Sōsōden (三國志曹操伝; lit. "Records of the Three Kingdoms: The Legend of Cao Cao") is the fifth release in the Eiketsuden tactical role-playing series developed by Koei, and the third to be set during the Three Kingdoms period.

== Story ==
The game retells the exploits of the ancient Chinese warlord Cao Cao. The events are based upon those depicted in Luo Guanzhong's historical dramatic novel Romance of the Three Kingdoms. The novel, itself, is based upon the historical battles and events of the actual Three Kingdoms period of ancient China.

While Cao Cao is portrayed as a villain in the novel, he is actually the protagonist of Sangokushi Sousouden. As such, the negative deeds attributed to Cao in the novel are either altered to depict him in a more positive light or simply removed entirely. Three prominent opposing characters in the novel, Liu Bei, Zhuge Liang and Sun Quan (with the former two being the protagonists in the first two Eiketsuden games), are Cao Cao's primary opponents in the game. The character portraits in this release are mostly enhanced, palette swapped re-creations of those used in the previous Sangokushi Eiketsuden and Sangokushi Koumeiden games, with the sole exception of Cao Cao, who has a unique appearance; However, the Mobile Game rerelease would later give everyone redesigned appearances as well.

== Gameplay ==
The player controls Cao Cao's forces – beginning the game during the Yellow Turban Rebellion – and loosely following the events of the novel until eventually unifying China. The player commands multiple characters including Cao Cao and several of his most prominent generals during battle. These generals can be permanently killed during certain scenarios. The player can opt to save them, although the player will not receive the special weaponry and armour left behind by the character after death. Each character belongs to a certain unit class, such as cavalry or infantry, with varying strengths and weaknesses. Unlike previous installments of the series, it is not possible to change a unit class using special items, although upgrades for each class are available at levels 15 and 30. Characters are differentiated by their personal statistics such as agility, intelligence, morale, and strength.

Each choice made by the player during gameplay affects a scale which tilts towards either "factual" (red) or "fictional" (blue), depending on how the choices made affirm or contradict the events depicted in the novel. Although the "factual" line adheres more closely to the events, and the personality of Cao Cao in the novel than the "fictional" line, it is, nevertheless, highly inaccurate; also, unlike the game's two predecessor titles, there is no historical "bad" ending in Sangokushi Sōsōden and Cao Cao survives the entire game through both story paths. The story will be altered following the Battle of Tong Pass, and depending on the status of the scale, the game will follow the predetermined "factual" or "fictional" storylines, according to Cao Cao's personality.

The "factual" arc involves eliminating Liu Bei's Shu Han and Sun Quan's Eastern Wu, thus uniting China under Cao Cao's rule. The "fictional" arc involves Zhuge Liang becoming possessed by a great evil who joins up with Zhou Yu to kill Liu Bei. One notable feature of this route is that Guan Yu, sworn oath brother of Liu Bei and enemy of Cao Cao, will permanently join Cao Cao's army to avenge Liu's death by killing Zhou Yu and Zhuge Liang.

== Remakes and mods ==
In 2016, Nexon Korea released a mobile remake of Sōsōden named Romance of the Three Kingdoms: The Legend of CaoCao for iOS and Android, developed by Thingsoft. In addition to the enhanced story mode, the free-to-play remake also adds an asynchronous player versus player mode and a co-op mode to take over China. The game was available in English, Korean, Japanese, Traditional Chinese, and Vietnamese. This mobile remake version is ported onto PC via the Steam platform on 25 July 2019. This remake, entirely online, was terminated on 11 June 2020.

Chinese Internet communities have produced various software modifications for Sangokushi Sōsōden, including a mod detailing the story of Song dynasty historical figure Yue Fei.
