= Super Mario 128 =

Technology demonstrations and projects developed by Nintendo

- Super Mario 128 as shown at the Space World event in August 2000
- Publisher: Nintendo
- Director: Yoshiaki Koizumi
- Series: Mario
- Platforms: 64DD, GameCube
- Genre: Technology demonstration

Super Mario 128 was a codename for two different development projects at Nintendo. The name was first used in 1997 for a sequel to Super Mario 64 for the 64DD, which was canceled. The name was reused for a GameCube tech demo at the Nintendo Space World trade show in 2000. Nintendo gradually incorporated the demonstrated graphics and physics concepts into the rapid object generation of Pikmin (2001), the physics of Metroid Prime (2002), and the sphere walking technology of The Legend of Zelda: Twilight Princess (2006) and Super Mario Galaxy (2007).

== History ==
=== Super Mario 64-2 ===
The name Super Mario 128 was first used as early as January 1997 by Shigeru Miyamoto, as a possible name for a Super Mario 64 sequel. The name Super Mario 64-2 was also used interchangeably with Super Mario 128. This rumored expansion and sequel to Super Mario 64 was said to be developed for the 64DD, but was canceled due to the 64DD's commercial failure. Miyamoto mentioned at E3's August 1997 convention that he was "just getting started" on the project. At Nintendo's Space World 1997 trade show in November 1997, Miyamoto added "We haven't decided [whether it's two-player] yet. We are currently working with a system where Mario and Luigi can co-exist, and they are both controllable by the player. But we will decide more game elements when we finish everything about Zelda."

We're in the middle of preparing Mario 64-2 for release on the 64DD. I'd like to take advantage of the 64DD's ability to store information. As of now, Luigi's also a full part of the game, but we haven't started thinking about 2-player gameplay with Mario and Luigi yet. We'll tackle that once we've got the system ironed out—we've figured out the processing power issues, so we could do it if we tried.

— Shigeru Miyamoto, December 1997

In May 1998, Miyamoto expressed hope in making the game as complex as Banjo-Kazooie. In November 1998, Miyamoto said, "Well, for over a year now at my desk, a prototype program of Mario and Luigi has been running on my monitor. We've been thinking about the game, and it may be something that could work on a completely new game system." The game had only a demo of one level made for it. Miyamoto claimed that multiplayer functionality was the first aspect of the game that he wanted to include.

Nintendo Power: How about the sequel to Super Mario 64?

Miyamoto: We've been thinking about the game, and it may be something that could work on a completely new system.

Nintendo Power: Are you planning on making a two-player game with simultaneous, cooperative play?

Miyamoto: We've actually been considering a four-player game with simultaneous play, but each screen would need to be very small, and we would have to implement new camera work. But it's these sort of problems that I like to tackle.

— Shigeru Miyamoto, Nintendo Power Subscriber Special, December 1998

Miyamoto had considered the two next frontiers of the Super Mario series to be a gameplay mechanic of walking on a rotating sphere, and coincidentally a setting in space—but it took a long time to find a way to resonate these ideas with the production team. He loved the novel idea of sphere walking, because it was totally unexplored in the game industry, and because focusing on a full sphere can eliminate camera movements and thus motion sickness. He learned greatly from the world's adaptation to the 3D gameplay of Super Mario 64 and he briefly experimented with rolling fields during the development of Paper Mario (2000) for Nintendo 64. During the development of Doshin the Giant for Nintendo 64, he eagerly proposed that it could become the first sphere walking game, but the staff rejected such an exceedingly massive development for the game which was released in December 1999.

=== GameCube demo ===
The name Super Mario 128 was reused for a new technology demonstration at the Space World event on August 24–26, 2000. This software was controlled by staff to show new gameplay mechanics and the processing power of the upcoming GameCube game console. Development of the demo was directed by Yoshiaki Koizumi, who would later become the director of Super Mario Galaxy. In the demo, a large 2D Mario spawned increasing numbers of smaller Mario figures, independently walking across a circular board, until the number of onscreen characters reached 128. The terrain in the demo was manipulated, rotated, and spun like a floppy saucer to show the physics engine software. GamePro declared Super Mario 128 to be one of the 15 most anticipated games of 2001. Regarding Nintendo's secrecy and lack of elaborate demonstration of the camera system, GamePro assumed that "The precautions are warranted as developer after developer aped the exact camera mechanism from Mario 64 for their titles."

Koizumi said he spent much thought after the event about the "close to impossible" undertaking of productizing Super Mario 128 as demonstrated. Koizumi later sought to demonstrate Mario walking on a gravitational sphere; the idea was not pursued until 2003.

There had always been distinctly separate development of Super Mario 128 and Super Mario Sunshine, which Miyamoto considered to be similar to Super Mario 64 anyway. He said, "obviously we were doing work on the Mario 128 demo that we were showing at Space World, and separately we were doing work on experiments that we made into Mario Sunshine." At Space World 2001, Super Mario Sunshine was unveiled as the next in the Mario series, released in 2002.

The 2001 GameCube game Super Smash Bros. Melee alluded to Super Mario 128 with a battle stage titled "Super Mario 128", where the player is assailed by a total of 128 tiny Mario figurines.

=== Resurfacing ===
In 2002, Miyamoto predicted that Super Mario 128 would let players "feel the newness that was missing" from Super Mario Sunshine because he thought of that game as more of a revisitation of Super Mario 64.

Rumors said that the reason for Nintendo not having shown Super Mario 128 at E3 2003 was because the game was extraordinarily innovative and Nintendo did not want other developers stealing the ideas from the game—as some had assumed about the Space World 2000 show. However, Miyamoto later confirmed that Super Mario 128 was still in development and that the development team had planned to take the Mario series in a new direction.

In 2003, Nintendo's George Harrison stated that Super Mario 128 may not appear on GameCube at all. Yoshiaki Koizumi, who had directed the original Super Mario 128 demonstration, joined Nintendo's new EAD Tokyo office. There, Shigeru Miyamoto encouraged him to develop the next Mario series game and Koizumi said this: "By working on [Donkey Kong Jungle Beat] together, I got to know the staff well enough by then, and I thought, if it was with this team, we may just be able to tackle the new and difficult challenge of making spherical platforms work." There at EAD in 2003, Koizumi's team began working on prototypical spherical platforms over three months, through iterative demonstrations for Miyamoto. Nintendo's President Satoru Iwata asked Miyamoto to develop the project, which became Super Mario Galaxy, for the Wii.

It was thought that Nintendo would unveil the game at E3 2004. Miyamoto again confirmed the existence of Super Mario 128 in an interview during February 2004, but the game failed to surface. Some believed this was due to the announcements of The Legend of Zelda: Twilight Princess and the Nintendo DS, both revealed at the 2004 show. GameSpy asked Miyamoto about the game after E3:

It's moving along secretly like a submarine under the water. When developing, we often look at the different hardware and run different experiments on it and try out different ideas. There have been a number of different experiment ideas that we have been running on the GameCube. There are some that we have run on DS, and there are other ideas, too. At this point I just don't know if we will see that game on one system or another. It is still hard for me to make that decision. I am the only director on that game right now. I have the programmers making different experiments, and when I see the results, we will make the final decision.

— Shigeru Miyamoto

IGN later in the year got a similar response. Miyamoto again asserted Super Mario 128's experimental nature.

At the GDC 2005, Nintendo of America's VP of Marketing, Reggie Fils-Aimé, stated that Super Mario 128 would be shown at E3 2005, probably in the form of a non-interactive video. However, for the third year in a row, the game once again failed to surface during E3. During a GameSpot video interview at E3, Reggie Fils-Aimé stated, "I can only show what Mr. Miyamoto gives me to show." When a reporter asked if it exists, he responded, "I've seen bits and pieces." In an interview with Miyamoto from 2005, a Wired News reporter confirmed that Super Mario 128 would not be produced for the GameCube, but rather that it had been definitively moved to the Wii (then code-named Revolution).

In September 2005, Shigeru Miyamoto gave his least ambiguous comments regarding Super Mario 128. Questioned as to the status of the game by a Japanese radio station, he revealed that Mario would have a new character by his side and reiterated that the game would appear on the Wii with a different name. He mentioned that Super Mario 128 had played a large role in the conception of the Wii console (then known as Revolution), as Super Mario 64 had done for the Nintendo 64. He went as far to say that the Wii was based around "this new type of game".

In 2006, Miyamoto said that he had forgotten whether Super Mario 64-2 had been prototyped for the 64DD, and said that "it's become other games". When asked whether he meant that the demo's gameplay functions are being used in other games, Miyamoto responded, "From the time that we were originally making Mario 64, Mario and Luigi were moving together. But we couldn't get it working in the form of a game", echoing his statements from 1999. He also hinted that some elements inspired by Super Mario 128, such as running upon a spherical surface, had been incorporated into Super Mario Galaxy.

On March 8, 2007, Miyamoto delivered the GDC 2007 keynote speech. He mentioned that Super Mario 128 was merely a demonstration of the GameCube's power and restated that several techniques from Super Mario 128 had become foundational gameplay concepts of the Pikmin series and the then-upcoming Super Mario Galaxy. He said "The one question I'm always asked is, 'What happened to Mario 128?' ... Most of you already played it ... in a game called Pikmin".

== Legacy ==
The 2001 GameCube game Super Smash Bros. Melee includes a battle stage titled "Super Mario 128" (Event 22), in which the player faces 128 tiny Mario figurines.

The software technology and concepts within the Super Mario 128 demonstration became or inspired core components of other Nintendo games: the explosive herding and wandering behaviors of multitudinous tiny automata in the Pikmin series since 2001; the physics of Metroid Prime in 2002; the sphere-walking gravity of Super Mario Galaxy in 2007; and the gravity-defying feature of the Iron Boots in The Legend of Zelda: Twilight Princess in 2006. The director of the Super Mario 128 demo, Yoshiaki Koizumi, became the director of Super Mario Galaxy.
