= Music of Clair Obscur: Expedition 33 =

Music from the video game Clair Obscur: Expedition 33

Lorien Testard (left) led composition of the game's original soundtrack, joined by Alice Duport-Percier (right), who was the primary composer of the vocal lines and the lead vocalist during recording.

The music of the 2025 role-playing video game Clair Obscur: Expedition 33, developed by Sandfall Interactive, comprises a soundtrack album and extended play composed principally by Lorien Testard. The soundtrack of Expedition 33, the first professional video game Testard wrote music for, was composed towards a wide variety of musical genres, ranging from classical to heavy metal, and made substantial usage of leitmotifs. During the five years of its development, Testard partnered with soprano Alice Duport-Percier, who took on the roles of vocal composer and main vocalist. For the soundtrack recording sessions, they were joined by approximately thirty other musicians and a nine-person choir.

The album, totaling 154 unique songs, represents the soundtrack of Expedition 33's base game and was released on 24 April 2025. It was met with unanimous praise from both audiences and critics for its distinctive atmosphere, emotional weight, and adaptability. Physical vinyl and CD releases in collaboration with record label Laced Records were announced in July 2025, and shipped in February 2026.

The album achieved uncommon commercial success for a video game soundtrack, reaching official top chart positions in many countries. It is the highest-charting video game soundtrack album in history in major countries such as France, the United Kingdom and Germany, as well as the second highest-charting ever in the United States. A four-night French concert tour, announced in September 2025, was fully booked in under an hour and took place in late October. It was followed by a sold-out full European tour from March to July 2026. An expanded international tour, scheduled for 2027, was announced in September 2026. The latter hits the stage in the United States for the first time and brings live performances to the largest indoor arenas across Europe.

The extended play, released on 12 December 2025, consists of 6 additional tracks featured in the "Verso's Drafts" playable level added as part of the game's free 1.5.0 "'Thank You' Update", formally revealed after it was named Game of the Year at The Game Awards 2025.

== Development ==
=== Background ===
The development of the game's soundtrack was headed by Lorien Testard. From an early age, Testard was interested in video games and their music, having been introduced to them by his father. He began teaching himself musical composition at the age of 16 for roughly three years, after which he attended a formal music school for another three years. He posted his music onto SoundCloud at a rate of approximately one track per week for a year. He has since named the scores of series such as The Legend of Zelda, Super Mario, Xenoblade, and Ori, as well as the songs of Joe Hisaishi composed for Studio Ghibli films, as among his personal favorites.

Expedition 33 was Testard's first professional video game for which he composed music. (Note: Before working on Expedition 33, Testard briefly contributed music for a technical demo of an indie game titled FAIRYMM: The Insomniac Beauty, whose production has since been abandoned.) He became connected with the game's director Guillaume Broche in early 2020 after the latter listened to one of Testard's SoundCloud tracks he had posted on a francophone online micro-forum dedicated to indie games. He was subsequently asked to join the project, at the time titled We Lost. During this period, Testard was employed as a guitar teacher, composing for We Lost in his free time. The COVID-19 pandemic occurred early into development, rendering him unable to instruct his students. This led him to quit his job, allowing him to work on the game full-time. Past an early script and conceptual artwork for the virtual landscapes, Testard had little explicit direction when composing, given relatively free rein to "really do whatever [he] wanted" to adapt the story's atmosphere into musical form. Both Broche and Testard had large ambitions on the scope of the score; their initial benchmark was to compose three songs, one custom battle theme, and one custom boss theme for each in-game environment. Although he attempted to limit the influence of other musicians on his songwriting to make the game's soundtrack feel distinct, he has acknowledged subconscious inspiration from the French artists he was exposed to throughout his life, including Alain Bashung.

=== Composition ===
"The first time Guillaume told me about the project, he said something like: 'You arrive at the beginning of the game after the heroes have already lost.' That set the tone."

— Lorien Testard, on the greater narrative atmosphere of Expedition 33 that shaped the framework of the game's score

Testard placed heavy emphasis on making the soundtrack feel dynamic, responding to the player's—and the greater world's—activities as the game's narrative progresses. During combat, accompanying music is designed to soften during long-winded periods of recuperation and to gradually intensify to complement the fight's climax and conclusion. Compensating for the overall unpredictability of the player's actions was cited by Testard as among the most challenging aspects of composition. He examined the emotional core of every battle, location, and character in a vacuum, guiding him as to what mood each song ought to elicit. This led to an assemblage of distinct musical genre, including jazz, rock, neoclassical and electronic music. He would later bring in over forty specialized instrumentalists to record the soundtrack, additionally using hundreds of other synthesized instruments through the digital audio workstation (DAW) Nuendo. Such instruments included the guitar, saxophone, cümbüş, bawu, piano, and bass. Avoiding repetition was a key goal for Testard; he explained, "... even if a player doesn't connect with one particular track, it won't become repetitive — they'll move on to a new environment and fight with a new musical atmosphere as their adventure continues." He also sought to occasionally make more comic and lighthearted pieces to offset the game's melancholic themes. For instance, the theme of the in-game mime enemies, titled "In Lumière's Name", was composed using accordions to the effect of making them catchy and memorable, while the music associated with the Gestral species was deliberately arranged to sound "quirky" and high-octane to match the Gestrals' "chaotic, goofy energy."

Testard made use of leitmotifs for both characters and explorable regions as a means of strengthening the story's emotional themes when invoked. In particular, the motif for the city of Lumière, whose plight is at the center of the plot, is heard in numerous points throughout the game, symbolizing the connection the main cast have to both Lumière itself and their ultimate quest to save its people. Among the earliest tracks Testard composed were the theme songs for individual characters, feeling that they were paramount to conveying the "soul" of Expedition 33. An exception was the theme for Gustave, which was the second-to-last song orchestrated overall. Testard attributed this to the narrative importance of Gustave's death at the end of the game's first act, taking extra care to "find the right melody". He approached the composition of character-driven themes largely through instinct, molding their sound to complement the characters' complex personalities, and he described them as the most enjoyable songs of the score for him to write.

About a year and a half into development, Alice Duport-Percier was recruited by Testard to be the main vocalist but ultimately also emerged as co-composer, as she became the primary writer of the vocal lines, including her own. Testard discovered Duport-Percier through videos she uploaded to YouTube, and they initially communicated over email. Testard, who undertook both the role of music composer and lyricist, chose to include lyrics in his songs because he believed that the human voice could best communicate the full range of intricate emotions exhibited by the characters, along with establishing a link between the real-world players and the virtual world of Expedition 33. The narrative's themes of creativity, especially in regard to painting and music, guided him during songwriting. Although a number of songs feature lyrics in living languages (in French mostly, with a few tracks in English), Testard wrote much of the songs with lyrics in a language he specifically invented for the game. One such song is "Alicia", the main menu theme. Testard wanted to give the song a universal appeal, as it would likely be the first players would hear, and did not want to attach it to a specific, real-world language. Meant to symbolically convey emotion, the lyrics are not necessarily intended to be translated word-for-word. To bring the soundtrack to life, over thirty musicians and a nine-person choir would join Testard and Duport-Percier for the recording sessions; including guest vocalists Victor Borba (who had sung numerous tracks for the 2019 video game Devil May Cry 5) and Axelle Verner (a French mezzo-soprano and friend of Duport-Percier). Ben Starr, who voiced Verso in Expedition 33, was also notably featured on the track "Until Next Life".

== Releases ==
=== Clair Obscur: Expedition 33 (Original Soundtrack) ===
Clair Obscur: Expedition 33 (Original Soundtrack)

Soundtrack album by Lorien Testard
- Released: April 24, 2025
- Genres: Video game music Classical music Neoclassical music Opera; Ambient music Jazz; Rock music Folk music Choral music Electronic music
- Length: 8:09:33; 9:10:06 (including Bonus Edition)
- Languages: Fictional language French; English
- Label: Laced Records (Note: Physical vinyl and CD releases)
- Producer: Lorien Testard

Clair Obscur: Expedition 33 (Original Soundtrack) is the soundtrack album for the base game of Expedition 33, featuring 154 distinct songs with a complete runtime of over eight hours. The pieces are arranged in approximate order of first appearance, mirroring the game's narrative progression. This was intentional, as Testard wanted players to be able to "relive the entire adventure" purely through listening to the album start to finish. A handful of songs heard in-game were not included in the final album, such certain ambient tracks, as some were deemed too similar to one another and thus cut for the sake of brevity.

The soundtrack was published onto streaming services on 24 April 2025. A physical vinyl release was first teased in an X video posted on 23 July by Ben Starr featuring both him and Jennifer English; the latter played Maelle in Expedition 33. The following day, on 24 July, pre-orders for physical album releases in collaboration with Laced Records, consisting of four different vinyl editions and one complete CD collection, were officially announced by Testard. The vinyl editions include a 6LP box set (with a regular and an exclusive edition) and a Deluxe 2LP one (standard and exclusive); each featuring 63 and 20 tracks respectively. The complete 8CD box set, meanwhile, features 179 tracks—the original 154, plus 25 extra tracks. Testard stated during an interview that the process of choosing which songs to include on the LP vinyls took approximately ten days, and he sought to create a sense of continuity for each record by including all songs of a given "atmosphere" on a respective side, e.g., upbeat battle music on one and emotional-driven pieces on the other. All editions shipped in February 2026.

An album containing solely 22 of the aforementioned bonus tracks, titled Clair Obscur: Expedition 33 – Nos vies en Lumière (Bonus Edition) (Original Soundtrack) (Note: "Nos vies en Lumière" is French for "Our lives in Lumière". The title alludes to the same-named 33-minute-long first track in the album, which compiles the songs "Une vie à t'aimer," "Une vie à peindre," and "Une vie à rêver", which roughly translate to "A life to love," "A life to paint," and "A life to dream" respectively; Sandfall refers to them as a "trilogy".) was released onto digital platforms on 24 July 2025.

==== Track listing ====
All tracks are orchestrated by Lorien Testard. Additional voicework for certain songs was composed by Alice Duport-Percier.

Disc 1
| No. | Title | Length |
|---|---|---|
| 1. | "Alicia" | 2:50 |
| 2. | "Gustave" | 3:48 |
| 3. | "Lumière" | 3:42 |
| 4. | "Lumière – Lumière à l'Aube" | 3:52 |
| 5. | "Lumière – Promenade dans Lumière" | 3:25 |
| 6. | "Lumière – Le Grand Café de Lumière" | 2:26 |
| 7. | "Lumière – Continuer à t'aimer (Lune)" | 1:50 |
| 8. | "Lumière – Rêveries dans Lumière" | 2:22 |
| 9. | "Lumière – Nocturne pour Lumière (Violoncelle)" | 3:26 |
| 10. | "Lumière – The Departure" | 4:04 |
| 11. | "Spring Meadows – Cloud of Anxiety" | 1:54 |
| 12. | "Spring Meadows – Cello Motifs" | 3:20 |
| 13. | "Spring Meadows – Éveil" | 2:46 |
| 14. | "Spring Meadows – Burial of the Lights" | 0:37 |
| 15. | "Spring Meadows – Get Up! For Lumière!" | 3:59 |
| 16. | "Spring Meadows – Linen and Cotton" | 3:47 |
| 17. | "Spring Meadows – Battling Breeze" | 3:17 |
| 18. | "Spring Meadows – Beneath the Blue Tree" | 3:11 |
| 19. | "Spring Meadows – Tomorrow is Here" | 2:46 |
| 20. | "Spring Meadows – Nightfall" | 1:27 |
| 21. | "Spring Meadows – L'Aurore aux Doigts de Roses" | 1:38 |
| 22. | "Lune" | 3:21 |
| 23. | "World Map – Taking Down the Paintress" | 2:43 |
| 24. | "World Map – In Lumière's Name" | 3:08 |
| 25. | "World Map – Until You're Gone" | 3:33 |
| 26. | "World Map – Forlorn" | 3:18 |
| 27. | "Flying Waters – Submerged Lights" | 2:33 |
| 28. | "Flying Waters – Electric Tides" | 5:15 |
| 29. | "Flying Waters – Goblu" | 2:56 |
| 30. | "Flying Waters – Serpenphare" | 3:08 |
| 31. | "Flying Waters – Rain from the Ground" | 3:05 |
| 32. | "The Curator" | 1:12 |
| 33. | "Un 33 Décembre à Paris" | 2:13 |
| 34. | "Ancient Sanctuary – Path on the Root" | 1:52 |
| 35. | "Ancient Sanctuary – Bonzaie Clairing" | 4:27 |
| 36. | "Ancient Sanctuary – Lake" | 2:14 |
| 37. | "Ancient Sanctuary – Gestral Summer Party" | 3:15 |
| 38. | "Ancient Sanctuary – Megabot#33" | 4:12 |
| 39. | "Ancient Sanctuary – Entrance of the Village" | 2:59 |
| 40. | "Gestral Village – Gestral Market" | 2:39 |
| 41. | "Gestral Village – Gestral Merchant" | 3:17 |
| 42. | "Gestral Village – Alicia (Gestrals)" | 3:26 |
| 43. | "Gestral Village – Continuer à t'aimer (Gestrals)" | 1:45 |
| 44. | "Gestral Village – Golgra's Throne" | 1:53 |
| 45. | "Gestral Village – Gestral Arena" | 2:12 |
| 46. | "Gestral Village – Golgra" | 3:14 |
| 47. | "Sciel" | 3:28 |
| 48. | "Esquie's Nest – Esquie's Bath" | 2:31 |
| 49. | "Esquie's Nest – François" | 1:45 |
| 50. | "Firecamp – Sciel" | 3:27 |
| 51. | "Firecamp – Lune" | 3:12 |
| 52. | "Stone Wave Cliffs – The Whale Next to the Cliff" | 1:58 |
| 53. | "Stone Wave Cliffs – Missing Hope" | 2:15 |
| 54. | "Stone Wave Cliffs – Lights of the Past" | 3:00 |
| 55. | "Stone Wave Cliffs – Sandfall" | 3:33 |
| 56. | "Stone Wave Cliffs – The Last Thing You'll See" | 3:57 |
| 57. | "Stone Wave Cliffs – Warding Blade" | 2:26 |
| 58. | "Stone Wave Cliffs – Lampmaster" | 3:44 |
| 59. | "Loin d'Elle" | 3:00 |
| 60. | "Une vie à t'aimer" | 11:00 |

Disc 2
| No. | Title | Length |
|---|---|---|
| 61. | "Verso" | 3:11 |
| 62. | "Forgotten Battlefied – Cemetery's Boat" | 1:52 |
| 63. | "Forgotten Battlefied – Lueur Déclinante" | 3:16 |
| 64. | "Forgotten Battlefied – Over the Fallen" | 3:24 |
| 65. | "Forgotten Battlefied – Divided Swords" | 3:42 |
| 66. | "Forgotten Battlefied – Dualliste" | 6:02 |
| 67. | "Forgotten Battlefied – Red Birds are Tied to the Ground" | 4:02 |
| 68. | "Lost Voice" | 2:33 |
| 69. | "Monoco's Station – Maelle's First Snow" | 2:09 |
| 70. | "Monoco's Station – Follow the Steps of Monoco" | 1:35 |
| 71. | "Monoco's Station – Grandis Domain" | 2:56 |
| 72. | "Monoco's Station – Ice's Caves" | 0:57 |
| 73. | "Monoco's Station – When the Snow Cries" | 9:24 |
| 74. | "Monoco's Station – Tics Tacs" | 3:30 |
| 75. | "Monoco's Station – Grandis Refuge" | 3:47 |
| 76. | "Monoco's Station – Twirling Voices" | 3:18 |
| 77. | "Monoco" | 2:21 |
| 78. | "Gestral Beach – I'd Rather Play Pétanque" | 2:56 |
| 79. | "Gestral Beach – My Grandma Hits Harder!" | 1:19 |
| 80. | "Gestral Beach – Is it a Gestral or a Volleyball?" | 2:37 |
| 81. | "Yellow Forest – Numbers the Hours" | 2:56 |
| 82. | "Yellow Forest – Honey and Clayworks" | 3:20 |
| 83. | "Yellow Forest – Nightfall" | 1:30 |
| 84. | "Falling Leaves – Noco's Root" | 3:12 |
| 85. | "Falling Leaves – Cave" | 1:31 |
| 86. | "Falling Leaves – Amber and Sap" | 1:50 |
| 87. | "Falling Leaves – Autumn's Brush" | 2:24 |
| 88. | "Sacred River – River Dream" | 2:03 |
| 89. | "World Map – Déchire la Toile" | 3:02 |
| 90. | "World Map – Waiting Canvas" | 1:45 |
| 91. | "World Map – Of Virtuosity and Heart" | 3:11 |
| 92. | "World Map – Gustave's Legacy" | 2:33 |
| 93. | "Lumière s'éteint" | 2:44 |
| 94. | "Old Lumière – Fragments Tell Stories" | 2:42 |
| 95. | "Old Lumière – When the Dust Settles" | 3:01 |
| 96. | "Old Lumière – Révérence" | 4:13 |
| 97. | "Eiffel" | 2:53 |
| 98. | "L'Amour d'un Père" | 4:14 |
| 99. | "Tout ce que je suis, pour toi" | 4:48 |
| 100. | "Sirène – Robe de Jour" | 2:21 |
| 101. | "Sirène – Robe de Nuit" | 2:20 |
| 102. | "Sirène – Tisser la Beauté" | 3:15 |
| 103. | "Sirène – Rouge d'Iris" | 3:19 |
| 104. | "Sirène – Poème d'Amour" | 5:05 |
| 105. | "Visages – Nocturne pour un Masque de Joie" | 2:06 |
| 106. | "Visages – Nocturne pour un Masque de Tristesse" | 2:06 |
| 107. | "Visages – Nocturne pour un Masque de Colère" | 2:06 |
| 108. | "Visages – Aria pour un Masque de Colère" | 2:16 |
| 109. | "Visages – Aria pour un Masque de Tristesse" | 2:08 |
| 110. | "Visages – Aria pour un Masque de Joie" | 2:08 |
| 111. | "Visages – Idéal Mental" | 4:42 |
| 112. | "Visages – Portrait Imparfait" | 4:53 |
| 113. | "Atelier de Clea – Mains Subtiles" | 2:50 |
| 114. | "Atelier de Clea – Peindre la Perfection" | 2:26 |
| 115. | "Atelier de Clea – Contre le Coeur" | 2:53 |
| 116. | "Atelier de Clea – Fleur de Paris" | 2:33 |
| 117. | "L'Amour d'une Soeur" | 1:54 |
| 118. | "Clea" | 3:10 |
| 119. | "Stuck in Maelle's Head" | 1:55 |
| 120. | "The Reacher – Naissance des cendres" | 2:26 |
| 121. | "The Reacher – Mémoires" | 3:16 |
| 122. | "The Reacher – Vers le Sommet" | 4:21 |
| 123. | "The Reacher – Entre les Marais et les Cimes" | 4:02 |
| 124. | "The Reacher – Orphelin" | 5:21 |
| 125. | "Près de Lui" | 3:00 |
| 126. | "Aline" | 2:35 |
| 127. | "Paintress" | 8:50 |
| 128. | "L'Amour d'une Mère" | 4:00 |

Disc 3
| No. | Title | Length |
|---|---|---|
| 129. | "Lettre à Maelle" | 2:20 |
| 130. | "We Lost" | 8:33 |
| 131. | "Dolorosa" | 2:49 |
| 132. | "Verso (Music Box)" | 1:24 |
| 133. | "Lullaby for my Sister (Music Box)" | 0:17 |
| 134. | "Gustave (Music Box)" | 0:55 |
| 135. | "Lumière (Music Box)" | 2:52 |
| 136. | "Sciel (Music Box)" | 1:49 |
| 137. | "Lune (Music Box)" | 1:49 |
| 138. | "Alicia (Music Box)" | 1:12 |
| 139. | "Lumière's Opera – Continuer à t'aimer (Piano)" | 2:15 |
| 140. | "Lumière's Opera – Nuit sur Lumière" | 3:56 |
| 141. | "Lumière's Opera – Un Air de Famille" | 2:26 |
| 142. | "World Map – Our Painted Hatred" | 2:52 |
| 143. | "World Map – Children of Lumière" | 2:31 |
| 144. | "Renoir" | 3:03 |
| 145. | "Une vie à peindre" | 11:00 |
| 146. | "Shared Canvas" | 0:56 |
| 147. | "Endless Light" | 4:56 |
| 148. | "It's Time to Stop Painting" | 3:09 |
| 149. | "Our Drafts Collides" | 7:52 |
| 150. | "Until Next Life" | 2:33 |
| 151. | "Clair-Obscur" | 3:39 |
| 152. | "Une vie à rêver" | 11:00 |
| 153. | "Aux Lendemains non Écrits" | 4:02 |
| 154. | "Maelle" | 2:50 |
| Total length: | | 490:33 |

Nos vies en Lumière (Bonus Soundtrack)
| No. | Title | Length |
|---|---|---|
| 1. | "Nos vies en Lumière" | 33:00 |
| 2. | "World Map – Taking Down the Paintress (Instrumental)" | 2:44 |
| 3. | "Flying Waters – Avasha Kapasatara" | 2:53 |
| 4. | "Our Drafts Unite" | 1:33 |
| 5. | "Gestral Village – Fight for the Win (Uno Puncho)" | 1:46 |
| 6. | "Gestral Village – Gestral Private Club" | 2:28 |
| 7. | "Monoco (Release Date Reveal)" | 2:23 |
| 8. | "Le Carousel de Lumière" | 1:14 |
| 9. | "Hold Me Esquie" | 3:03 |
| 10. | "Sciel (Piano)" | 3:56 |
| 11. | "Alicia (Violin)" | 2:26 |
| 12. | "Whispers of Tomorrow" | 1:25 |
| 13. | "Nocturne pour Lumière" | 3:03 |
| 14. | "Shadow of the Monolith (Cast Reveal Trailer)" | 2:13 |
| 15. | "For Those Who Come After (Release Date Reveal Trailer)" | 2:43 |
| 16. | "We Are Expedition 33 (Reveal Trailer)" | 2:13 |
| 17. | "World Map – Our Painted Death" | 4:18 |
| 18. | "For Those Who Come After – Instrumental" | 3:10 |
| 19. | "For Those Who Come After" | 6:57 |
| 20. | "Until Next Life (Solo Voice)" | 2:33 |
| 21. | "Simon, the Divergent Star" | 4:33 |
| 22. | "Alicia (Reveal Trailer)" | 2:26 |
| Total length: | | 60:33 |

=== Clair Obscur: Expedition 33 – Verso's Drafts (Original Soundtrack) ===
Clair Obscur: Expedition 33 – Verso's Drafts (Original Soundtrack)

EP by Lorien Testard
- Released: December 12, 2025
- Genres: Video game music Classical music Neoclassical music Opera; Electronic music Folk music Ambient music
- Length: 19:33
- Languages: French; Fictional language
- Producer: Lorien Testard

Clair Obscur: Expedition 33 – Verso's Drafts (Original Soundtrack) comprises 6 additional songs featured in the "Verso's Drafts" area.

The soundtrack was made available worldwide after the release of the game's 1.5.0 update, titled the "'Thank You' Update", on 12 December 2025, formally announced during Guillaume Broche's acceptance speech after Expedition 33 was named Game of the Year at The Game Awards 2025. The update was previously teased by Sandfall Interactive in an 8 October blog post, made in commemoration of Expedition 33 selling over 5 million copies.

Track listing

All tracks are orchestrated by Lorien Testard.

Verso's Drafts
| No. | Title | Length |
|---|---|---|
| 1. | "Osquio" | 4:42 |
| 2. | "Whee Whoo Days" | 3:06 |
| 3. | "Time to Swim Swim" | 2:17 |
| 4. | "Where He Used to Play" | 3:24 |
| 5. | "The End in Me" | 2:54 |
| 6. | "Pour que Naisse un Bouquet" | 3:10 |
| Total length: | | 19:33 |

==== Personnel ====
Information taken from the soundtrack's official YouTube release.

- Lorien Testard – Composer
- Alice Duport-Percier – Vocalist
- Horacio París – Drum
- Nisa Addina – Violin
- Emanuel Pavon – Cello
- Josué González – Piano
- Vitaliy Tkachuck – Guitar
- Khai Zen Yap – SFX

== Reception and commercial success ==
"Une vie à t'aimer" ("A life to love")
An excerpt from "Une vie à t'aimer", featuring Victor Borba as a guest vocalist. The song was praised for its hybridization of "Bizet operetta" and "metal-tinged rock", and Testard described it as among the most challenging for him to compose.

=== Critical reception ===
The soundtrack was met with acclaim from reviewers. Publications such as Edge characterized the soundtrack overall as immense and "operatic". Game Informer's Kyle Hilliard praised the "somber piano music and haunting vocals" that reflect the narrative's melancholy, while also highlighting the combat themes that "bring the energy back up at precisely the right moment". Screen Rant's Lee D'Amato further lauded the battle music for reinforcing what he called the "life-altering stakes" of each fight. Destructoid called the soundtrack "bombastic", with editor Scott Duwe praising it as intense and memorable. Testard and his work was compared favorably to other critically-acclaimed video game scores. Alan Wen of GamesRadar+ equated the songs of Expedition 33 to the soundtrack of Nier: Automata (2017), lauding the former as "beautifully sweeping" with "heartbreaking French soprano vocals destined to linger in the same way as" the latter title. Additionally, Matt Purslow of IGN likened Testard to Final Fantasy series composer Nobuo Uematsu. The songs' adaptability was complimented, with Nicholas Becher of Screen Rant praising their intentionality and ability to mold how each scene is emotionally perceived by the player.

=== Charts ===
The soundtrack album achieved unusual commercial success by industry standards. In the United States, it reached the top spot on Billboard's Top Classical Albums chart and Top Classical Crossover Albums chart in the first week of May 2025, maintaining the No. 1 position for six consecutive weeks. It additionally placed at No. 13 and No. 6 on the Official Charts Company's Album Downloads chart and Soundtrack Album Downloads chart respectively in the United Kingdom. In early October 2025, Sandfall announced that within the 5 months since the game's release, the soundtrack had amassed over 333 million cumulative track streams across digital music platforms; had spent over 10 weeks at No. 1 on the two Billboard charts aforementioned; and had reached the No. 1 spot on iTunes Top 100 Albums chart in nine countries. The soundtrack album ultimately ranked No. 2 on both Billboard's Classical Albums chart and Classical Crossover Albums chart for the year 2025, behind Andrea Bocelli's Duets (30th Anniversary); thus becoming the highest-ranked video game soundtrack album in history on Billboard's year-end charts.

On 24 April 2026, the day of the game's first anniversary, Sandfall announced the soundtrack had been streamed digitally over 617 million times since launch (or 645 million times including the "Nos vies en Lumière" and "Verso’s Drafts" tracks). In the wake of the physical vinyl and CD releases in February, it had secured multiple chart positions in various countries—such as six No. 1 spots in the Official Charts in the United Kingdom, two No. 1 spots in the French charts as well as a No. 2 spot in the overall Top 200 Albums chart in France, a No. 2 spot in the Top 100 Albums chart in Germany, or six Top 5 spots in the Billboard album charts in the United States.

During the launch week of the soundtrack album's physical formats in February 2026, the vinyl editions alone sold 24,000 copies in the United States—the largest single sales week for a video game soundtrack on vinyl in the country since electronic sales tracking began in 1991. The vinyl release debuted at No. 1 on both the Billboard Top Classical Albums and Top Classical Crossover Albums charts, at No. 2 on the Top Soundtracks chart, at No. 4 on both the Vinyl Albums and Top Current Album Sales charts, at No. 5 on the Top Album Sales chart, and at No. 6 on the Independent Albums chart. With the vinyl release having debuted at No. 29 on the all-genre Billboard 200, Expedition 33's soundtrack is one of only three video game soundtrack albums—alongside the BTS World: Original Soundtrack and the Halo 4 Original Soundtrack (each debuting at No. 26 and No. 50 respectively)—to have reached the Top 50 since the Billboard 200 began publishing weekly in March 1956.

Meanwhile, the CD release—grouped together with the digital album (download and streaming) as a separate chart entity by Billboard—debuted thirteen spots behind the vinyl album on the Top Album Sales chart (at No. 18), thirty-eight spots behind it on the Independent Albums chart (at No. 44), and peaked five spots behind it (at No. 7) on the Top Soundtracks chart. This combined CD/download/streaming version also held the No. 2 spot, right behind the vinyl release, on both the Top Classical Albums and Top Classical Crossover Albums charts (the digital album by itself having spent 21 weeks at No. 1 on these two charts in 2025, before the CD release in February 2026).

Expedition 33's soundtrack album is the highest-charting video game soundtrack album in history in the likes of France, the United Kingdom and Germany; as well as the second highest-charting ever in the United States, only behind the BTS World: Original Soundtrack.

Chart performance for Clair Obscur: Expedition 33 (Original Soundtrack)
| Chart (2026) | Peak position |
|---|---|
| Austrian Albums (Ö3 Austria) | 15 |
| Belgian Albums (Ultratop Flanders) | 11 |
| Belgian Albums (Ultratop Wallonia) | 3 |
| Dutch Albums (Album Top 100) | 70 |
| Dutch Gamemuziek Top 50 (NPO Klassiek) | 19 |
| French Albums (SNEP) | 2 |
| French Physical Albums (SNEP) | 1 |
| French Vinyl Albums (SNEP) | 1 |
| German Albums (Offizielle Deutsche Charts) | 2 |
| Norwegian Physical Albums (IFPI Norge) | 2 |
| Scottish Albums (Official Charts) | 1 |
| Swiss Albums (Schweizer Hitparade) | 13 |
| UK Albums (Official Charts) | 16 |
| UK Albums Sales (Official Charts) (Note: The Official Albums Chart counts both sales and streaming activity, while the Official Albums Sales Chart counts pure purchases only (physical copies and digital downloads)) | 1 |
| UK Physical Albums (Official Charts) | 1 |
| UK Album Downloads (Official Charts) | 13 |
| UK Soundtrack Albums (Official Charts) | 1 |
| UK Vinyl Albums (Official Charts) | 1 |
| UK Independent Albums (Official Charts) | 1 |
| US Billboard 200 | 29 |
| US Top Album Sales (Billboard) | 5 |
| US Top Current Album Sales (Billboard) | 4 |
| US Vinyl Albums (Billboard) | 4 |
| US Independent Albums (Billboard) | 6 |
| US Top Soundtracks (Billboard) | 2 |
| US Top Classical Albums (Billboard) | 1 |
| US Top Classical Crossover Albums (Billboard) | 1 |

=== Concert tours ===
A mini-tour in collaboration with French production company Bleu Citron Tournées—starring Testard and Duport-Percier, accompanied by the Orchestre Curieux—was announced in September 2025. Titled "A Painted Symphony", tickets for the tour sold out within 45 minutes. The four-night tour took place in medium-size venues capable of accommodating 2,000 to 3,100 people seated in the French cities of Lyon (25 October 2025 at the Amphithéâtre 3000), Paris (28 and 29 October at the Salle Pleyel) and Montpellier (31 October at the Corum). As a result of the success, a full-scale tour in venues able to host 2,000 up to 12,079 people was confirmed for 2026, with 19 concert dates in 15 cities across Europe (in France, Germany, the United Kingdom, Italy, the Netherlands, Belgium, Luxembourg and Switzerland); immediately followed by 5 additional open-air performance dates during customary summer music festivals in the French cities of Nancy, Nîmes, Carcassonne, Toulon and Lyon. Tickets went on sale on 2 December 2025, with most dates selling out within minutes. The 2026 tour began on 18 March in Berlin and concluded on 24 July in Lyon.

In light of the sold-out European tour, warm reception and global demand, a third and expanded "A Painted Symphony" tour in 2027 was announced on 8 September 2026. This world tour will hit the stage in venues able to accommodate 5,900 up to 25,000 people, and will thus feature live performances in several of Europe's largest indoor arenas by capacity. Many dates, including the four in the United States, sold out within minutes again when tickets went on sale on 15 September. Spain and Poland's largest indoor arenas (the Palau Sant Jordi and Tauron Arena Kraków respectively), as well as the UK and France's third largest (The O2 and LDLC Arena)—venues with capacities ranging from 16,000 to 22,000—also sold out the same day tickets were released. By the end of October, over 60% of the dates had sold out, with new fully booked venues including the Netherlands' largest indoor arena (the Ziggo Dome) and Germany's second largest (the Uber Arena). The tour is expected to begin on 28 January 2027 at the Galaxie in Amnéville, and conclude on 7 October at the Greek Theatre in Los Angeles.

== Accolades ==
The soundtrack earned nominations at numerous awards shows, including at all five major game awards ceremonies (The Game Awards, D.I.C.E. Awards, Game Developers Choice Awards, British Academy Games Awards and Golden Joystick Awards). The absence of a nomination for "Best Score Soundtrack for Video Games and Other Interactive Media" at the 68th Annual Grammy Awards ceremony was met with criticism from some reviewers who felt the soundtrack was snubbed.

| Year | Award | Category | Result | Ref. |
|---|---|---|---|---|
| 2025 | World Soundtrack Awards | Game Music Award | Won | |
| 2025 | Golden Joystick Awards | Best Soundtrack | Won | |
| 2025 | The Game Awards 2025 | Best Score and Music | Won | |
| 2025 | The Steam Awards | Best Soundtrack | Won | |
| 2025 | PlayStation Blog Game of the Year Awards | Best Soundtrack | Won | |
| 2025 | IGN Community Awards 2025 | Best Video Game Music/Score | Won | |
| 2026 | 15th New York Game Awards | Tin Pan Alley Award for Best Music in a Game | Nominated | |
| 2026 | 29th Annual D.I.C.E. Awards | Outstanding Achievement in Original Music Composition | Nominated | |
| 2026 | 7th Pégases | Best Audio | Won | |
| 2026 | 24th Game Audio Network Guild Awards | Music of the Year | Won | |
| 2026 | 24th Game Audio Network Guild Awards | Best Original Soundtrack Album | Won | |
| 2026 | 24th Game Audio Network Guild Awards | Best Main Theme | Won | |
| 2026 | 24th Game Audio Network Guild Awards | Best Original Song (Lumière) | Won | |
| 2026 | 26th Game Developers Choice Awards | Best Audio | Won | |
| 2026 | 22nd British Academy Games Awards | British Academy Games Award for Music | Nominated | |
| 2026 | NAVGTR Awards 2025 | Original Dramatic Score, New IP | Won | |
| 2026 | NAVGTR Awards 2025 | Song, Original or Adapted (Alicia) | Nominated | |
| 2026 | NAVGTR Awards 2025 | Song, Original or Adapted (Lumière) | Nominated | |
| 2026 | Develop:Star Awards 2026 | Best Audio | Won | |
