= Mahito Yokota =

Japanese music composer and orchestrator

Mahito Yokota 横田 真人
- Genres: Video game music; symphonic
- Occupations: Composer; orchestrator
- Instrument: Piano
- Years active: 1998–present

Mahito Yokota (横田 真人, Yokota Mahito) is a Japanese music composer and orchestrator who works for the video game development company Nintendo. He is most known for his collaborations with Koji Kondo in the Super Mario Galaxy series, along with Super Mario 3D World. Yokota served as an audio director at Koei prior to joining Nintendo in 2003.

== Works ==
Year	Title	Role
1998	Sangokushi Sōsōden	Music
1999	Saiyuki: Journey West	Sound effects
2000	Kessen	Sound director
2001	Kessen II	Sound director
2002	Dynasty Tactics	Music
2002	Crimson Sea	Sound director
2003	Dynasty Warriors 4	Music with various others
2003	Dynasty Tactics 2	Music with Masato Koike
2004	Donkey Kong Jungle Beat	Music
2006	The Legend of Zelda: Twilight Princess	Orchestrations
2007	Super Mario Galaxy	Music with Koji Kondo
2008	Wii Music	Music with Kenta Nagata and Toru Minegishi
2010	Super Mario Galaxy 2	Music with Ryo Nagamatsu and Koji Kondo
2011	The Legend of Zelda: Ocarina of Time 3D	3DS adaptation of the original score
2011	Super Mario 3D Land	Music with Asuka Hayazaki and Takeshi Hama
2011	The Legend of Zelda: Skyward Sword	Music with Hajime Wakai, Shiho Fujii, and Takeshi Hama
2012	New Super Mario Bros. U	Music with Shiho Fujii
2013	New Super Luigi U	Music with Shiho Fujii
2013	Super Mario 3D World	Music with Toru Minegishi, Yasuaki Iwata, and Koji Kondo
2014	Mario Kart 8	Sound Support
2014	Super Smash Bros. for Nintendo 3DS and Wii U	"Star Wolf's Theme / Sector Z"
2014	Pikmin Short Movies	Music with Hajime Wakai
2014	Captain Toad: Treasure Tracker	Music with Naoto Kubo
2015	The Legend of Zelda: Majora's Mask 3D	3DS adaptation of the original score
2015	Mario Tennis: Ultra Smash	Supervisor
2016	Mini Mario & Friends: Amiibo Challenge	Supervisor
2017	Mario Kart 8 Deluxe	Sound Support
2017	Arms	Sound Support
2017	Super Mario Odyssey	Sound Management
2018	Super Smash Bros. Ultimate	Main theme recording manager
2021	Mario Golf: Super Rush	Sound Supervisor
2022	Mario + Rabbids Sparks of Hope	Sound Supervisor
2023	The Super Mario Bros. Movie	Supervisor
2023	Mario Kart 8 Deluxe - Booster Course Pass	Sound Support
2023	Super Mario RPG	Sound Supervisor
2024	Mario vs. Donkey Kong	Sound Supervisor
2024	The Legend of Zelda: Echoes of Wisdom	Sound Supervisor
2025	Mario Kart World	Sound Support
2025	Donkey Kong Bananza	Sound Management
