= Yoshiaki Koizumi =

Japanese video game designer (born 1968)

- 小泉 歓晃
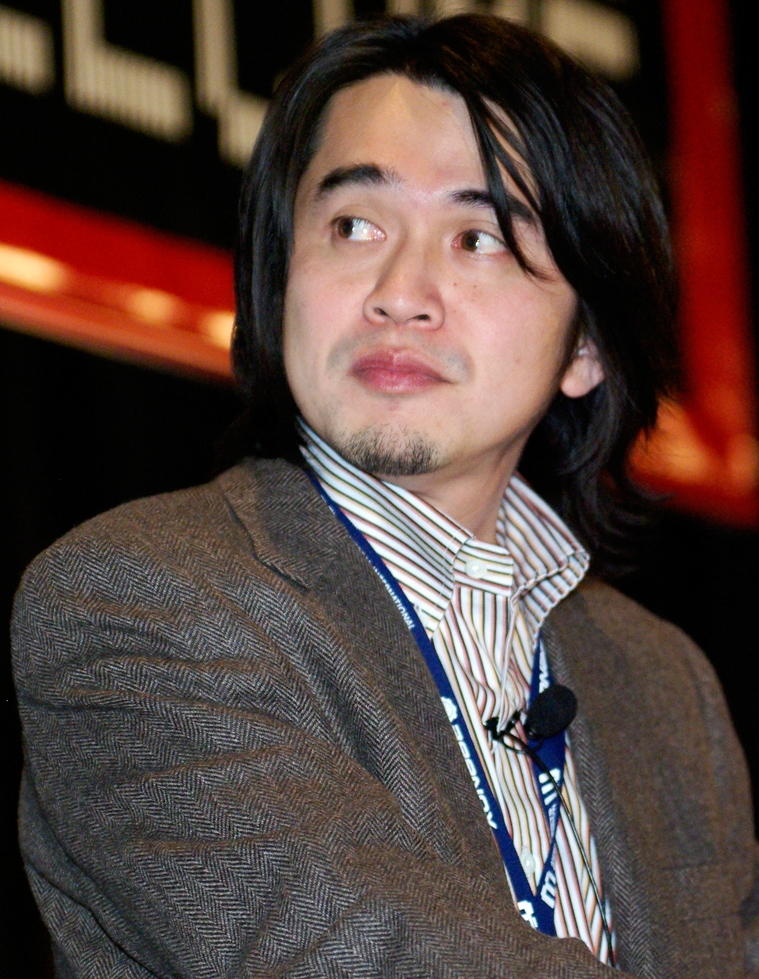
- Koizumi at Montreal International Games Summit in 2007
- Born: April 29, 1968 (age 58); Mishima, Shizuoka, Japan
- Education: Osaka University of Arts
- Occupations: Video game designer, director and producer
- Employer: Nintendo (1991–present)
- Notable work: The Legend of Zelda; Super Mario
- Title: Manager at Nintendo EAD (2008–2015); Representative Director at 1-Up Studio (2013–2023); Deputy General Manager at Nintendo EPD (2015–2023); Senior General Manager at Nintendo EPD (2023–present); Executive Officer at Nintendo (2018–2020); Senior Executive Officer at Nintendo (2020–present)

Yoshiaki Koizumi (小泉 歓晃, Koizumi Yoshiaki; born April 29, 1968) is a Japanese video game designer, director, producer, and business executive. He is a senior executive officer at Nintendo and a senior general manager at Nintendo EPD, where he is known for his work within their Mario and The Legend of Zelda series, and as the General Producer of the Nintendo Switch. In 2009, he was chosen by IGN as one of the top 100 game creators of all time. Koizumi is also on the board of directors of Nintendo Pictures.

== Biography ==
=== Early life ===
Koizumi was born in Mishima, Shizuoka on April 29, 1968. He played his first video game, Super Mario Bros. 2, at the age of 21 when he borrowed a friend's Family Computer console. A graduate from the Visual Concept Planning Department of Osaka University of Arts, Koizumi studied film, drama, animation and, to a lesser extent, storyboarding. He had originally intended to become a film director but applied at Nintendo instead to pursue his goal of creating a kind of drama only experienced in video games. The company's close proximity to his university also played a role in his career choice.

=== Nintendo ===
After Koizumi had joined Nintendo in April 1991, he was assigned to work on the manual for the action-adventure game, The Legend of Zelda: A Link to the Past for the Super Nintendo Entertainment System, for which he did the art, layout and writing. In the process, he conceived the game's backstory and the designs of the three goddesses and the star sign associated with them. For the sequel, The Legend of Zelda: Link's Awakening, he was again tasked with designing the manual. However, since work on the game had just begun, Koizumi would end up creating its entire story and came up with plot ideas such as the island in a dream. He also worked on the event design for the interactions with the villagers, wrote the owl's and the Wind Fish's lines and designed the bosses' behavioral patterns. Koizumi later experimented with a polygonal, side-scrolling remake of Zelda II: The Adventure of Link. Developed for the Super Nintendo Entertainment System, the prototype was based on chanbara action, a type of Japanese sword fighting. With Super Mario 64, Koizumi became assistant director and animated the 3D models, among others working on Mario's swimming movements in cooperation with director Shigeru Miyamoto.

While developing Super Mario 64, Nintendo's employees devised rough concepts of a three-dimensional The Legend of Zelda game with a bigger focus on puzzles and less pronounced action elements. Koizumi wrote several notes on sword battles and combat with multiple opponents. When he joined Toru Osawa and Jin Ikeda, he was the third staff member to work on the game that would become The Legend of Zelda: Ocarina of Time. Koizumi consulted his earlier notes and tried to inject leftover ideas from Super Mario 64 into this new Zelda installment. On the lookout for inspiration on chanbara action, Osawa suggested a visit to Toei Kyoto Studio Park, a film studio theme park. There, Osawa, Koizumi and Ikeda entered a playhouse where several ninjas and a main samurai were staging a show. Koizumi observed how only one of the ninjas would attack the main samurai at a time while the others remained in a waiting pattern, which proved to be the solution to designing battles with multiple opponents. Osawa noticed how a ninja using a kusarigama weapon would move around the main samurai in circles and never lose track of his opponent. Both of these observations became the basis for the Z targeting system used in Ocarina of Time. Koizumi replaced the simple triangle the team had implemented to mark the player's focus with a fairy that would change colors based on the friendly or hostile nature of the Z target. Furthermore, he was in charge of the player character Link and designed other characters such as the horse Epona. He also worked on the 3D environments, the camera system, the items and some of the event design, such as the scenes where the player overhears the conversations of other characters.

Following Ocarina of Time, Koizumi was designing a "cops and robbers"-style board game that had the player catch a criminal over the course of a week in-game, or roughly equivalent to an hour in real time. However, he was pulled off the project and asked to help develop the sequel to Ocarina of Time, The Legend of Zelda: Majora's Mask. Koizumi carried over his "cops and robbers" idea with the time limit and expanded it into a world threatened by a falling moon after he had daydreamed about such a scenario. The concept was corroborated by Miyamoto's wish to have a "compact" Zelda that could be played over and over again, and the ideas eventually evolved into a system with a three-day time loop. Koizumi was again placed in charge of the game's player characters. He also wrote many of the scheduled events involving the villagers of Clock Town, for which he tried to depict the characters' lives as realistically as possible. Many of the serious elements in Majora's Mask came from Koizumi, which his coworker Eiji Aonuma countered by introducing more lighthearted portions in the areas he was in charge of.

In 2003, Koizumi switched to Nintendo's Tokyo Software Development Department and directed the 2D platformer Donkey Kong Jungle Beat. The game's side-scrolling nature sprang from Koizumi's attempt to overcome problems with complex camera controls in 3D titles. These efforts continued in his next title, Super Mario Galaxy. The game's spherical levels eliminated the possibility of the player getting lost or the need for adjusting the camera when reaching the end of a flat surface. Koizumi directed Super Mario Galaxy and was heavily involved in the creation of its story, deciding on the inclusion of the optional fairytale book that tells the characters' backstory. Following this, he was promoted to producer and was manager of Tokyo Software Development Group No. 2 within the company's Entertainment Analysis & Development Division. In September 2015, he became Deputy General Manager of the newly formed Entertainment Planning & Development Division. Koizumi also served as General Producer of Nintendo's 2017 video game console, the Nintendo Switch. He alongside Shinya Takahashi also succeeded Satoru Iwata as the host of the Nintendo Direct video presentations since 2017, and has been doing so since the live streamed Nintendo Switch Presentation, which took place on January 12, 2017.

Koizumi was part of the board of directors of Nintendo's subsidiary 1-UP Studio as one of its representative directors from 2013 to 2023. In October 2022, he joined the board of directors of Nintendo Pictures.

In 2023, Koizumi was promoted from Deputy General Manager to Senior General Manager at Nintendo EPD division after almost 10 years in the position, below only Executive General Manager Shinya Takahashi who also was promoted at the same time.

== Game design ==
If you think about games only as a thing that you interact with, you're missing the possibility of immersion. The inspirations that I tend to draw on for that all come from real life itself. Hiking on a mountain and seeing a cave and thinking about what's inside – it's that sense of wonder and excitement I want players to feel.

— Koizumi on his game design philosophy

Koizumi is a protégé of Shigeru Miyamoto and often draws his ideas from real-world influences such as hiking. When creating fictional worlds, he tries to surprise players with visually impressive environments and difficult gameplay mechanics while still ensuring "ease of use", that is effortless navigation and control. He said that most of his time on a video game is spent working on player characters and their abilities in order to strike a balance between "fun and complexity" in control. Koizumi mentioned tempo and rhythm as some of the most important elements of a Mario game, whereas he gave anticipation of the awaiting challenges as a crucial factor in a Zelda title. Unlike Miyamoto, Koizumi often tries to introduce story elements to the video games he works on. He trains his staff by hinting at the direction they should take rather than just giving them the solution to a problem.

== Ludography ==
Year	Game	Role(s)
1991	The Legend of Zelda: A Link to the Past	Illustrator
1992	Super Mario Kart	Illustrator
1993	The Legend of Zelda: Link's Awakening	Script writer, designer
1995	Yoshi's Island	CG artist
1996	Super Mario 64	Assistant director, 3D animator
1998	The Legend of Zelda: Ocarina of Time	3D system director, designer
2000	The Legend of Zelda: Majora's Mask	Game system director, designer
2000	Super Mario 128	Director
2002	Super Mario Sunshine	Director
2002	The Legend of Zelda: The Wind Waker	Assistant director
2004	Donkey Kong Jungle Beat	Director
2007	Super Mario Galaxy	Director, game design, story
2008	Flipnote Studio	Producer
2010	Super Mario Galaxy 2	Producer
2011	Super Mario 3D Land	Producer
2013	Flipnote Studio 3D	Producer
2013	Super Mario 3D World	Producer
2013	NES Remix	Producer
2014	NES Remix 2	Producer
2015	The Legend of Zelda: Majora's Mask 3D	Supervisor
2017	Super Mario Odyssey	Producer
2019	The Stretchers	Producer
2019	Dr Kawashima's Brain Training for Nintendo Switch	Staff
2021	Super Mario 3D World + Bowser's Fury	Staff
2025	Super Mario Galaxy + Super Mario Galaxy 2	Producer
2026	Star Fox	Producer
2026	Xenoblade Chronicles 2 - Nintendo Switch 2 Edition	Senior producer
2026	Nintendo Switch Sports Resort	Senior producer
2026	The Legend of Zelda: Ocarina of Time	Senior producer

Non-gaming credits

2023	The Super Mario Bros. Movie	Nintendo creative executive
2026	The Super Mario Galaxy Movie	Nintendo team
