= Thingsoft =

South Korean game development company

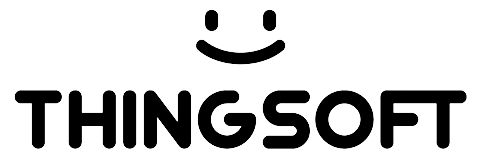
- Company type: Game Developer
- Industry: Online Games
- Founded: 2010
- Defunct: November 2022
- Headquarters: Seoul, South Korea
- Key people: Sangwon Chung (CEO)
- Divisions: Studio One; Studio NT

Thingsoft (Korean: 띵소프트) was an online game development company in South Korea. Its headquarters is in Seoul, South Korea.

It was merged into Nexon by absorption in November 2022.

== History ==
Thingsoft was originally established in 2005 with funding from Neowiz, a large South Korean online game publisher. Neowiz fully acquired Thingsoft in 2006 following the successful launch of Thingsoft's first commercial product, FIFA Online. The acquisition integrated Thingsoft into the Neowiz as an internal development studio. In 2007, Neowiz split into several smaller companies, and Thingsoft was officially changed to Neowiz Games Development Studio. Thingsoft was responsible for the development of several online games including FIFA Online, FIFA Online 2, the NBA Street Online series, Battlefield Online, Warlord, Xogu Pigu, Sashinmu, and Perfect KO. FIFA Online 2 proved especially successful in South Korea and garnered over 180,000 concurrent users in 2006 and over 220,000 concurrent users in 2010.

In 2010, the founders of Thingsoft and core developers from FIFA Online 2 and Project GG left Neowiz Games to start a new independent online development company. The new company acquired the rights to the trademark and is once again known as Thingsoft.

On 27 August 2019, Nexon announced Thingsoft's Peria Chronicle was cancelled after 9 years of development, and Chung Sangwon had resigned from the president. The total cost of the game's development is estimated as ₩60,000,000,000. Afterwards, Thingsoft went into a state of closure with no real in-house development. In November 2022, Nexon dissolved the developer by absorption.

== Divisions ==
=== Studio One ===
Studio One consists of core members from the FIFA Online 2 development team. Studio One focuses on developing casual online games and is currently developing social network games. Studio One has developed its own online game engine capable of supporting both casual MMO games and social network games. Studio One's first social network game, "Wonder Cruise", launched on Facebook in December 2011. Wonder Cruise is a cruise simulation game where users are tasked with running their own luxury cruise liner.

=== Studio NT ===
Studio NT consists of core members from the Project GG development team. Studio NT is developing a new MMORPG, codenamed "Project NT", utilizing their proprietary 3D engine using an enhanced animation system.

=== Project NT ===
Project NT is an MMORPG that uses cell animation in a Japanese anime style. The game utilizes a self-developed engine that the developers say will allow players to use various sandbox features such as building a town and play-writing cutscenes.
