= Super Mario Galaxy =

2007 video game

- Developer: Nintendo EAD Tokyo (Note: Nvidia Lightspeed Studios developed the Nvidia Shield version. Nintendo Software Technology developed the Nintendo Switch version.)
- Publisher: Nintendo
- Director: Yoshiaki Koizumi
- Producers: Shigeru Miyamoto; Takao Shimizu
- Designers: Yoshiaki Koizumi; Shigeru Miyamoto (concept)
- Programmers: Naoki Koga; Takeshi Hayakawa
- Artist: Kenta Motokura
- Writers: Takayuki Ikkaku; Yoshiaki Koizumi
- Composers: Mahito Yokota; Koji Kondo
- Series: Super Mario
- Platforms: Wii; Nvidia Shield TV; Nintendo Switch
- Release: 1 November 2007: Wii; JP: 1 November 2007; NA: 12 November 2007; EU: 16 November 2007; AU: 29 November 2007 Nvidia Shield TV; CHN: 22 March 2018 Nintendo Switch; WW: 2 October 2025
- Genres: Platform, action-adventure
- Modes: Single-player, multiplayer

Super Mario Galaxy (Note: Japanese: スーパーマリオギャラクシー, Hepburn: Sūpā Mario Gyarakushī) is a 2007 platform game developed and published by Nintendo for the Wii. It is the third 3D platformer game in the Super Mario series. As Mario, the player embarks on an extraterrestrial mission to rescue Princess Peach and save the universe from his arch-nemesis Bowser, after which the player can play the game as Luigi for a more challenging experience. The levels consist of galaxies filled with minor planets, asteroids, and worlds, with different variations of gravity, the central element of gameplay. The player-character is controlled using the Wii Remote and Nunchuk and completes missions, fights bosses, and reaches certain areas to collect Power Stars. Certain levels also use the motion-based Wii Remote functions.

Nintendo EAD Tokyo began developing Super Mario Galaxy after the release of Donkey Kong Jungle Beat in late 2004, when Shigeru Miyamoto suggested that Nintendo commission a large-scale Mario game. The concept of spherical platforms originated from Super Mario 128, a tech demo for the GameCube shown at Nintendo Space World in 2000. Nintendo aimed to make the game appeal to players of all ages, and the team had more freedom in designing it compared to other Super Mario games because of the outer space setting. The game was directed by Yoshiaki Koizumi and the soundtrack was composed by Mahito Yokota and Koji Kondo, using a symphony orchestra for the first time in the series.

Super Mario Galaxy was released on the Wii in Japan on 1 November 2007, with other major territories getting releases for later that month. The game received universal acclaim from critics who lauded its graphics, gravity mechanics, level design, soundtrack, setting, and story. It is the ninth best-selling Wii game worldwide with sales of 12.80 million. The game received a sequel, Super Mario Galaxy 2, in 2010, which also saw similar accolades to its predecessor.

Galaxy is often hailed as one of the best games in the series and one of the best video games of all time. It was the highest-rated game of all time on the review aggregator site GameRankings at the time of the site's closure in 2019. It won several awards from top gaming publications, including multiple "Game of the Year" titles, and became the first Nintendo title to win the BAFTA Award for Best Game. In addition, the game has seen numerous re-releases, notably on the Nvidia Shield TV in China on 22 March 2018, and the limited-print compilation Super Mario 3D All-Stars for the Nintendo Switch on 18 September 2020. Both Galaxy games were enhanced and re-released as a collection for the Nintendo Switch on 2 October 2025, and are able to also be purchased separately on the console's eShop. A sequel to 2023's The Super Mario Bros. Movie featuring elements from the game, The Super Mario Galaxy Movie, was released in 2026.

== Gameplay ==
=== Premise and setting ===
Mario running across a planetoid. The game's gravity mechanics allow Mario to fully circumnavigate round or irregular objects.

Super Mario Galaxy is set in outer space, where Mario travels through different galaxies to collect Power Stars, earned by completing missions, defeating a boss or reaching a particular area. Each galaxy contains planetoids and orbiting structures for the player to explore. Each astronomical object has its own gravitational force, allowing the player to completely circumnavigate the planetoids, walking sideways or upside down. The player can usually jump from one independent object and fall towards another one nearby. Although the main gameplay is in 3D, there are several areas in the game in which the player's movements are restricted to a two-dimensional plane.

The game's main hub is the Comet Observatory, a spaceship which contains six domes that provide access to most of the game's 42 available galaxies, with each dome except one holding five. Five domes end with a boss level in which the objective is to defeat Bowser or Bowser Jr. and earn a special Power Star, known as a Grand Star, that gives the player access to the next dome. The player only has access to one galaxy when they begin the game; as more Power Stars are collected, more galaxies and Stars become available. The player is awarded the ability to play as Luigi after collecting 120 Power Stars as Mario. Once 120 Power Stars are collected with both characters, the player is rewarded with one additional challenge. Completing this challenge grants the player the 121st star and a commemorative picture that can be sent to the Wii Message Board.

=== Controls ===
The player-character is controlled via the Wii Remote and Nunchuk. While most of Mario's abilities are taken directly from Super Mario 64, such as the long jump, wall jumps, and a variety of somersaults, a new feature called the Star Pointer that uses the Wii Remote's motion sensor is included. It is a small blue cursor that appears when the Wii Remote pointer is pointed at the screen. The Star Pointer is used to pick up special konpeito-shaped objects called "Star Bits", which can then be shot to stun enemies, manipulate obstacles or feed Hungry Lumas (star-shaped sentient beings). The pointer can also latch onto small blue objects called "Pull Stars", which can pull Mario through space. In certain levels that encase the player in a floating bubble, the Star Pointer is used to blow wind and maneuver the bubble.

Early in the game, the player learns a new ability known as the "Spin" technique, which has appeared in varying forms throughout the Super Mario franchise. In Super Mario Galaxy, the "spin" is primarily used for melee attacks to stun enemies and shatter objects, as well as triggering special propellers called "Sling Stars" or "Launch Stars" that launch Mario across large distances through space. The "spin" utility is also used for climbing vines, ice skating, flipping switches, unscrewing bolts and for activating several power-ups. Other Wii Remote functions are available for smaller quests, such as surfing aboard a manta ray or balancing atop a large ball and rolling it through an obstacle course.

=== Power-ups and lives ===
Clockwise starting from the top left; the interface displays the number of Power Stars, life meter, number of coins and Star Bits, and number of lives.

Seven power-ups grant Mario temporary abilities. For example, special mushrooms bestow the player with a Bee, Boo or Spring Mushroom. The Bee Mushroom allows Mario to hover through the air, climb on honeycombs and walk on clouds and flowers; the Boo Mushroom allows him to float through the air, become transparent and move through certain obstacles; the Spring Mushroom allows him to jump to high areas that would be otherwise inaccessible. The Fire Flower allows Mario to throw fireballs at enemies, and the Ice Flower grants flame attack immunity and allows Mario to create hexagonal ice tiles to cover any liquid surface he walks on. The Rainbow Star grants Mario invincibility and lets him run faster, while the Red Star allows him to fly for brief periods of time by shaking the Wii Remote as well as attract nearby coins and Star Bits.

Mario's health consists of a three-piece health meter, which is depleted through contact with enemies and hazards. When swimming underwater, Mario has an air supply meter, which quickly depletes his main health meter if it runs out. Mario's health and air supply can be restored by collecting coins, or through touching bubbles if underwater. When the health meter becomes empty, the player loses a life and must go back to a predetermined checkpoint. The health meter can temporarily expand to six units through the use of a Life Mushroom. Instant death can occur by being swallowed by quicksand or dark matter, by being crushed by hazards or by falling into black holes or other bottomless pits. The player can obtain extra lives by collecting 1-Up Mushrooms, 50 coins without losing a life or 50 Star Bits.

=== Multiplayer ===
Super Mario Galaxy has a co-operative two-player option called "Co-Star" mode, in which one player controls Mario while the other uses only the Wii Remote to control a second Star Pointer on-screen to gather Star Bits and shoot them at enemies. The second player can also make Mario jump; the height of Mario's jump can be increased if the first and second player press the A button at the same time. The second player can prevent some enemies from moving by aiming the pointer star at them and holding the A button.

== Plot ==
The centennial Star Festival is held to watch a comet pass by the Mushroom Kingdom. On the night of the Star Festival, Princess Peach discovers a star-shaped creature called a Luma and invites Mario to the festival to show it to him. As Mario approaches the castle, Bowser attacks the Mushroom Kingdom with a fleet of airships and a massive flying saucer, which he uses to lift Peach's castle into outer space. Mario attempts to enter the castle but is attacked by Kamek, one of Bowser's minions, and cast loose into space, with the Luma following after him.

Awakening on a small planet, Mario is introduced to Rosalina, a guardian of the cosmos and caretaker of the Luma and his brethren, who resides in a starship called the Comet Observatory. Rosalina explains that during a centennial visit to her home world, Bowser attacked the Observatory and stole the Power Stars that act as its power source, rendering it immobile. Bestowed with the power to travel through space by the Luma that Peach found, Mario sets off on a journey across the universe to reclaim the Power Stars and restore power to Rosalina's observatory. Along the way, he finds friends from the Mushroom Kingdom such as Luigi and the Toads while fighting Bowser and Bowser Jr. at certain points.

Upon collecting enough Power Stars, the Comet Observatory flies to the center of the universe, where Bowser is holding Peach captive. While confronting Bowser, Mario learns that he plans to rule the entire universe with Peach at his side. Mario defeats Bowser and frees Peach, but one of the galaxy's planets collapses on itself, becoming a supermassive black hole that begins consuming the entire universe. The Lumas sacrifice themselves and jump into the black hole to destroy it, causing the black hole to collapse into a singularity; the universe is recreated entirely as the singularity explodes in a supernova. Rosalina appears to Mario, revealing that dying stars are later reborn as new stars, allowing the cycle of life to continue. Mario then awakens in the recreated Mushroom Kingdom alongside Peach and Bowser, and he celebrates the new galaxy that has emerged in the skies. If the player collects 120 stars, Rosalina will thank the player and, with the reborn Lumas, leave aboard the Comet Observatory to travel the cosmos again.

== Development ==
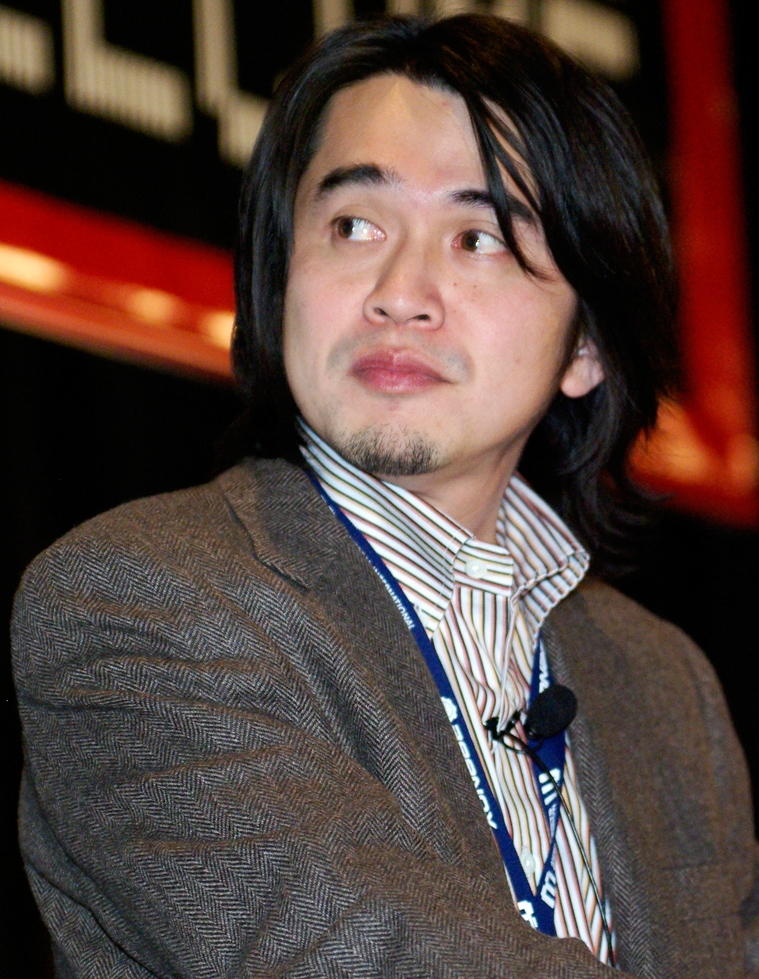
Yoshiaki Koizumi, the director and designer of Super Mario Galaxy, had the idea to incorporate abilities shown in a technology demonstration for the Nintendo Space World in 2000.

The conception of Super Mario Galaxy can be traced back to late 1996, shortly after the release of Super Mario 64. Despite it having a significant foundational influence on how 3D games are made, some members of Nintendo's staff observed that the game caused a separation between potential players that did not exist during the 2D era of video games, with some people feeling that 3D games are too difficult for them to play. Assistant director Yoshiaki Koizumi believed that this perceived difficulty came from their attempts to keep the player from experiencing depth misperception, getting lost and feeling motion sickness. The solutions created to mitigate these problems, most significantly camera controls, resulted in systems that were too cumbersome or at least intimidating for players. After Super Mario 64 was released, creator Shigeru Miyamoto assembled a team within Nintendo EAD to develop a successor–tentatively titled Super Mario 128–to address this problem.

The principles for Super Mario Galaxy's gameplay originated from ideas taken from Super Mario 128, which was later shown as a technology demonstration at Nintendo Space World in 2000 to exemplify the processing power of the GameCube. The demonstration's director (and future director of Super Mario Galaxy), Yoshiaki Koizumi, desired that one of its distinguishing features, spherical-based platforms, should be used in a future game, but was held back in belief that such a feature would be impossible for technical reasons. After the release of Super Mario Sunshine in late 2002, Miyamoto asserted that the game was unrelated to Super Mario 128 but instead a continuation of Super Mario 64, not a proper successor that built on the concepts it introduced. Koizumi later regretted preparing different camera modes that the players can choose from, since it became a burden to decide on the camera angle before going into gameplay. In mid-2003, before the newly-formed Nintendo EAD Tokyo started work on Donkey Kong Jungle Beat, a staff member was interested in combining their skills as a team to make the next Super Mario game, to which Koizumi later agreed after their experience of working on Jungle Beat together. Miyamoto suggested to work on the next large-scale Mario game after Nintendo EAD Tokyo finished development on Donkey Kong Jungle Beat in late 2004, pushing for the spherical platform concept to be realised.

In 2005, Koizumi prepared documents for the game–which was under the working title of Super Mario Revolution–for the Wii, which was still under development at the time. Adapting their knowledge of the Super Mario 128 project and their experience of working together on Jungle Beat, the game was set to be a 3D action platformer with Mario running around spherical worlds–which provided their own centers of gravity to prevent Mario from falling off the edge. If he kept moving forward in one direction, he would return to his starting position, limiting the player's chances of getting lost. After the project was greenlit by Nintendo's executives, Koizumi spent three months creating a small prototype with a few EAD Tokyo employees to share with Miyamoto for his feedback, setting a pattern where he would be the first one to playtest all of the game's builds. During development, the designers would often exchange ideas with Miyamoto from his office in Kyoto, where he would make suggestions to the game design. According to Koizumi, many ideas were conceived before development of the Wii console itself begun.

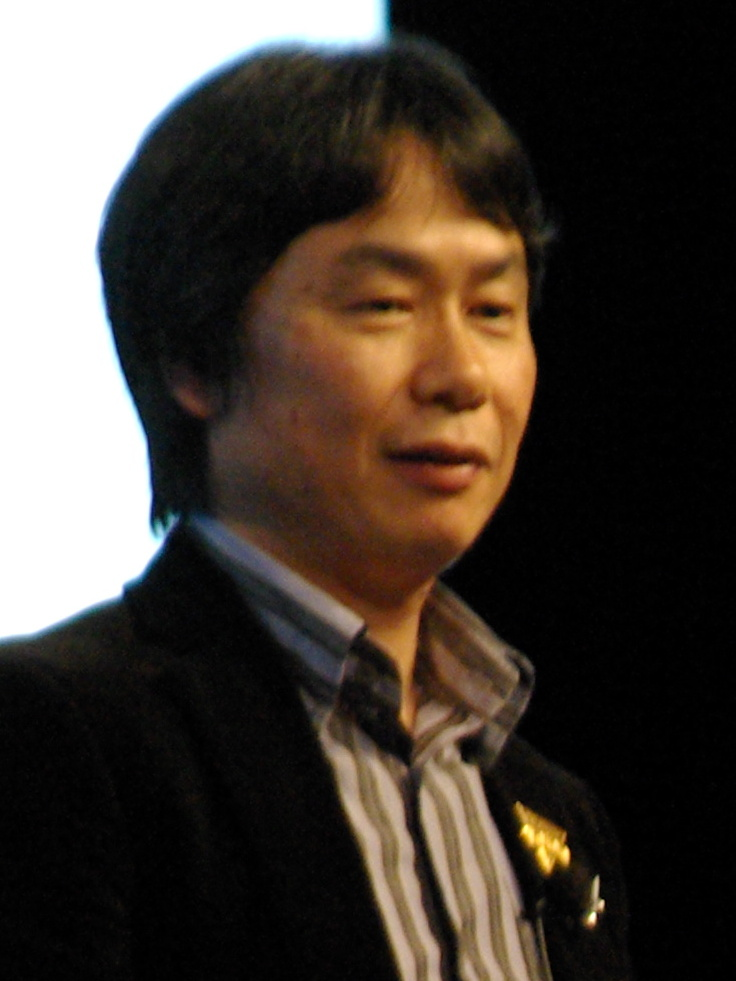
Shigeru Miyamoto, pictured at GDC 2007, where he revealed a new trailer for Galaxy

The idea for Mario to have a "spin" attack came during the early stages of development, when it was decided that jumping on enemies on a spherical map would be difficult for some players – at one point, Koizumi remarked that making characters jump in a 3D environment was "absurd". Takeo Shimizu, the game's producer and programmer, noted that the most basic action in a 3D action game was to simply run, and concluded that the easiest way to attack was to "spin", not jump. Prior to the development team shifting focus on the Wii and realising the potential of its different controls, the "spin" attack was originally planned to be executed by swivelling the analogue stick on the GameCube controller. The "spin" was initially activated via rotation of the Nunchuk's control stick, but after motion sensing was confirmed to be implemented in the Wii Remote, the "spin" was changed to be activated through shaking the latter. The team originally allowed Mario to spin indefinitely by shaking the Wii Remote, but Miyamoto had them integrate a delay after the spin to make the game more challenging. Nintendo president Satoru Iwata wanted to prioritise the game's "fun factor" by giving the player a sense of achievement after they have completed a difficult task; Iwata noted an increasing number of consumers giving up during a video game and thus wanted Super Mario Galaxy to appeal to that audience. In response, the development team created a co-operative mode which allowed one player to control Mario whilst the other controlled the pointer with the Wii Remote, therefore enabling lesser experienced players to enjoy themselves in the game.

The development team wanted the game to be enjoyed from the ages of "5 to 95", so during early stages of development, they took steps to ensure that the player would adjust to the game without difficulty. However, Miyamoto thought that it was too easy and lacked insensitivity, asserting that a game loses its excitement when it is made unchallenging. To balance out the difficulty, Koizumi suggested altering the game's "intensity factor" by limiting the number of hits the player could take to three as opposed to Super Mario 64 and Super Mario Sunshine, where the number was eight, but simultaneously placing more 1-Up Mushrooms and checkpoints in the game. Retrospectively, Iwata said that the decision to decrease the health meter is "representative of the things that players do not notice that actually change the gameplay dramatically".

With the concept of gravity and spherical platforms being the central elements of gameplay, the development team drafted several ideas on how to implement them into the game. Koichi Hayashida, a co-designer of the game, initially expressed scepticism of incorporating a spherical playing field into a jump-based platform game, stating that it would be "a bad match". Shimizu also had a negative reaction to the idea, with his main concern being that the implementation of spherical platforms would be impossible to achieve due to technical reasons, and "felt a sense of danger" when the plan was eventually approved. However, once Shimizu started debugging the game he realised that the experience felt "totally fresh" and thought that he was "playing a game like nothing that's come before it". Futoshi Shirai, the game's level designer, stated that unlike Hayashida and Shimizu, he had a positive impression of the new gameplay elements. Shirai liked the idea of being able to run on different types of planetoids, and came up with designs such as planets in the shape of ice cream and apples. Because the game was set in outer space, the team could devise ideas that would have otherwise been hard to implement in other Super Mario games. Shirai said that the benefit of working with a spherical-shaped world was that they could design and discover new things, with Kenta Motokura, the game's artist, similarly stating that the player would be continuously enjoying their adventure by traveling to new planets. Koizumi appreciated the "free and open" feel of developing the game, saying that it enabled the team to make the game more fun for the player.

Throughout development, staff members enjoyed the level of freedom the game offered, in particular the transforming abilities of Mario. Iwata noted that Mario's Bee Suit was popular with women, and also stated that the titular character's other suits were designed to add variations to the gameplay. According to Hayashida, the idea to include transformations in the game came from Koizumi. One of the female members of staff who worked on Super Mario Galaxy wrote a note saying "I want a Bee Mario" when asked by Koizumi what they wanted to transform Mario into. Shirai stated that the development team always discussed their ideas together, and devised ways to incorporate an idea into the game and make it more entertaining. Iwata concluded that having the game take place in space was advantageous, as it was flexible enough to accommodate a wide range of ideas. During development, Miyamoto saw the game as a "true" successor to Super Mario 64, and surpassed the indefinitely-halted Super Mario 128 project.

During the first public showcase of Super Mario Galaxy at E3 2006, Miyamoto stated it would release within six months of the Wii's launch. However, EAD Tokyo felt it was more important to make a game they were really happy with, resulting in it launching eleven months after the Wii. After development was finished, the team reflected that the fundamental part of a Super Mario game was to make the player think about how "fun" it was to play the game itself, rather than simply finishing it. To accomplish this, Koizumi made sure that there were certain areas of the game which could be enjoyed by all types of people, including children. Shimizu added that Super Mario Galaxy's ulterior motive was to have everybody "gather around the TV", as he felt that a game starring Mario was not necessarily something which could be enjoyed by playing alone. The game was made to support six different save files – Shimizu liked the idea of one player looking at the progress of another player and seeing how they compared against their own. Iwata stated that when the first Super Mario game was released, there used to be "many more" people gathering around the television who would enjoy watching the gameplay experience. Iwata asserted that well-made video games were more enjoyable to spectate, and hoped that Super Mario Galaxy's co-operative mode would tempt someone who does not usually play video games to join.

=== Music ===
During development, Mahito Yokota, who was in charge of the musical direction, originally wanted Super Mario Galaxy to have a Latin American style of music, and even had composed 28 tracks in that style. Latin American percussion instruments had already been featured in previous Super Mario installments, such as steelpans, bongo drums and congas. For Super Mario Galaxy's theme, Yokota used Latin American instruments and a synthesiser to replicate the sounds featured in old science fiction films. The composition was approved by Yoshiaki Koizumi, the game's director and designer, but when Yokota presented it to the game's sound supervisor, Koji Kondo, he stated that it was "no good". When asked why his music was rejected, Kondo responded: "If somewhere in your mind you have an image that Mario is cute, please get rid of it." Incensed by the rejection, Yokota almost resigned from his job, but Kondo implied that Mario's character was "cool" and instructed him to try again.

According to Yokota, he was under the impression that Mario was suited for children, causing him to create "cute" music that would appeal to the targeted audience. Koizumi, after Yokota's music was rejected, later complimented him telling him "It wasn't so bad." Three months later, Yokota presented three different styles of music to Miyamoto: one piece had an orchestral sound, the other had pop music, and the last featured a mix of both orchestral and pop music. Miyamoto chose the orchestral piece, as it sounded the most "space-like". Yokota stated that Miyamoto chose the piece without knowing that Kondo actually wrote it. In a retrospective interview, Satoru Iwata said that Miyamoto chose the music that sounded "space-like" because he was looking for a sound that would express the game, in contrast to the tropical sounds of Super Mario Bros. Yokota revealed that he initially struggled to create music that sounded like a Super Mario game, but as time progressed he declared that the songs he made for the game had "become natural".

To create a sense of variety with the soundtrack, Yokota and Kondo wrote pieces individually; Kondo composed five pieces for the game whereas Yokota composed the rest. Kondo composed the pieces that Yokota specifically requested, as he thought that the game's soundtrack would "end up all sounding the same" if it were composed by one person. The game originally heavily utilised the Wii Remote speaker for "all sorts of sound [effects]", but Masafumi Kawamura, the game's sound director, decided they were redundant when played in tandem with those from the television. Kawamura decided to restrict Wii Remote sound effects to those triggered by Mario's actions, such as hitting an enemy, feeling that it better immersed the player.

The game's soundtrack features 28 orchestral songs performed by a 50-person symphony orchestra. Yokota initially had concerns whether or not orchestral music would fit in with the rhythm of a Mario game, but thought that such music would make the scale of the game "seem more epic". Kondo, on the other hand, believed if orchestral music were used the player would be "obligated to play the game in time to the music". To synchronise the soundtrack to gameplay, Kawamura utilised similar techniques he used to synchronise sound effects in The Legend of Zelda: The Wind Waker and Donkey Kong Jungle Beat – in which the game synchronises MIDI data with streaming data, resulting in sound effects playing at the same time as background music. To make synchronisation possible, the audio team requested the orchestra to perform at different tempos set with a metronome.

The official soundtrack was released on 24 January 2008. It was initially an exclusive to Club Nintendo subscribers in Japan, although the soundtrack became available to European Club Nintendo members in November 2008. The soundtrack was released in two versions: the Original Soundtrack, which only contains 28 tracks from the game, and the Platinum Edition, which contains another 53 tracks on a second disc for a total of 81 tracks. In North America, the Original Soundtrack was included in a black Wii Family Edition console bundle alongside New Super Mario Bros. Wii in 2011.

== Reception ==
Reception

Aggregate scores
Aggregator	Score
GameRankings	97.64%
Metacritic	97/100
OpenCritic	94% recommend (Note: Based on 79 reviews)

Review scores
Publication	Score
1Up.com	A
Computer and Video Games	9.5/10
Edge	10/10
Eurogamer	10/10
Famitsu	38/40
Game Informer	9.75/10
GamePro	5/5 stars
GameRevolution	A
GameSpot	9.5/10
GameSpy	5/5 stars
GamesRadar+	5/5 stars
GameZone	9.8/10
IGN	9.7/10
Nintendo Life	10/10
Nintendo World Report	10/10
Official Nintendo Magazine	97%
Play	10/10

Award
Publication	Award
BAFTA, GameSpot, IGN, Nintendo Power, Kotaku, Yahoo! Games	Game of the Year

Super Mario Galaxy has received critical acclaim, becoming the fourth-highest-rated game of all time on review aggregator Metacritic with an aggregate score of 97 out of 100 based on 73 reviews. Before the review-aggregate website GameRankings shut down in December 2019, it was listed as the highest-rated game with at least 20 reviews, having a 97.64% ranking based on 78 reviews.

The visuals and presentation were the most praised aspects of the game. Chris Scullion of the Official Nintendo Magazine asserted that the graphics pushed the Wii to its full potential, and stated that its visual effects and large playing areas would constantly astound the player. Jeremy Parish from 1UP.com noted that despite the Wii's limitations, the visuals were "absolutely impressive", especially when modified at a higher resolution. Computer and Video Games's Andrew Robinson opined that Nintendo favored gameplay over graphics, but thought Super Mario Galaxy "got both perfect". Margaret Robertson of Eurogamer called the visuals an "explosion of inventiveness", stating that the game's detail is only matched by its mission design ingenuity. Andrew Reiner of Game Informer approved of the game's portrayal of water and particle effects, but noted the visuals were in similar detail to Super Mario Sunshine. Patrick Shaw from GamePro opined that the game takes full advantage of the Wii's capabilities, both in terms of presentation and control schemes.

Regarding the presentation, GameRevolution's Chris Hudak thought that Super Mario Galaxy was a "next-gen reincarnation" of Super Mario 64, stating the game was polished, engaging and evocative. Alex Navarro of GameSpot commended the colourful and vibrant level details, animations and character designs, saying that "there simply isn't a better-looking Wii game available". Furthermore, Navarro praised the game engine's ability of keeping frame rate drops to "infrequent bouts". Bryn Williams of GameSpy asserted that the game had the best visuals on the Wii, saying that the graphics "are out of this world" and that its wide range of colours produces "better-than-expected" texturing. A reviewer from GamesRadar stated that "words simply can't describe" the game's visual concepts. Louis Bedigan from GameZone thought the visualisations from Super Mario Galaxy contrast from the blocky characters of previous Super Mario games, praising the planet designs as beautiful and everything else as "pure eye candy". Matt Casamassina of IGN thought Super Mario Galaxy was the only game that pushed the Wii console, stating it combines "great art" with "great tech", resulting in what he described to be "stunning results". David Halverson of Play opined that the game was "supremely" polished and featured "gorgeous next-gen" graphics.

The gameplay, in particular the gravity mechanics and use of the Wii Remote, was also praised. A reviewer from Famitsu commented on the game's tempo, believing it was "abnormally good" and that the different variations in level design and difficulty gradually "builds things up". A reviewer from Edge praised the game's use of the Wii Remote, stating the control schemes were more subtle and persuasive as opposed to the "vigorous literalism" of The Legend of Zelda: Twilight Princess. Scullion was initially sceptical about using the Wii Remote as a pointer, but admitted that "within mere minutes it felt like we'd been doing this since the days of Mario 64". Scullion also thought that the game's strongest aspect was the "incomparable" gameplay. Parish praised the fluctuating gravity that was featured in the game, stating that it "makes even the wildest challenge feel almost second nature". Robinson similarly commended the gravity, saying that the different uses of the game's gravitational pulls allows the scale to grow to "genuinely draw-dropping proportions". Robertson regarded the use of gravity as an "explosion of inventiveness". Reiner thought that the game reinvented the platform genre for the seventh generation of video game consoles, stating that Super Mario Galaxy was both nostalgic and new by breaking the laws of physics.

Shaw asserted that the new gameplay mechanics reinvigorated the Super Mario franchise, and summarised by saying it was the best title since Super Mario 64. Similarly, Hudak thought that the game was a reincarnation of Super Mario 64, whilst stating that the variety of gameplay had a "signature Miyamoto style". Navarro said that the level designs were "top flight in every regard" and also praised the game's introduction of suits, adding that they brought a "great dimension" to gameplay. Williams opined that the game's "shallow" two-player mode did not add anything to the overall experience. He did praise the various gameplay components and the use of both the Wii Remote and Nunchuck, stating that the setup was "pinpoint accurate". A reviewer from GamesRadar thought that the control scheme had a fluid response that improved over the controls of its predecessor, Super Mario Sunshine. Regarding the controls and world designs, Bedigan stated that both aspects are "close to perfection as a game can get". Casamassina found the gameplay mechanics, in particular varying physics, as "ridiculously entertaining". He also regarded the motion control as being well implemented, stating that the player would appreciate the change of pace that the levels offer. Halverson particularly commended the innovative controls, saying the Wii Remote and Nunchuck was "at its finest" and that it was difficult to imagine playing it in another fashion.

The soundtrack and audio were well received by critics. Scullion believed it to be the best out of any Super Mario game, declaring that each track matches the environments featured throughout the game. Parish considered the orchestrated music superior to the visuals, saying that the dynamic sounds were "quintessentially Mario" yet uncharacteristically sophisticated. Reiner stated that the orchestrated soundtrack was beautiful as well as nostalgic, with Robinson similarly citing it as "amazing". Navarro praised the modernised orchestrated soundtrack, stating that it was both excellent and "top-notch". Williams thought the game featured the best sound on the Wii, stating that original soundtrack would "go down in history" as Nintendo's best first-party effort. A reviewer from GamesRadar stated that Super Mario Galaxy featured the finest orchestral bombast ever heard in a game. Bedigan asserted that the soundtrack was "another step forward" in video game music, praising the music as moving and breathtaking. Casamassina judged the game's music "so exceptional" and "absolutely superb", summarising that it had the best music out of any Nintendo game to date. Hudak criticised the "traditional Mario-esque" lack of voice acting, despite admitting that if the game did feature voice acting it would "probably seem lame and wrong".

=== Sales ===
Super Mario Galaxy was a commercial success, selling 350,000 units in Japan within its first few weeks of sale. In the United States, the game sold 500,000 units within its first week of release, earning it the highest first-week sales for a Mario game in the country at the time. The NPD Group reported that 1.4 million copies of the game were sold in the US in December 2007, making it the highest-selling game of the month, and that the game had become the fifth best-selling game of 2007 with 2.52 million units having been sold since its release. After 13 months, it had sold 7.66 million copies worldwide. By January 2010, the game had sold 4.1 million units in the US, and by February it had become one of nine Wii titles to surpass 5 million unit sales in the country. By the end of March 2020, Nintendo had sold 12.80 million copies of the game worldwide, making it the third best-selling non-bundled Wii game and the ninth best-selling Nintendo-published game for the Wii.

=== Awards ===
Super Mario Galaxy received Game of the Year 2007 awards from IGN, GameSpot, Nintendo Power, Kotaku, and Yahoo! Games. The game was also perceived as the highest ranking title in 2007 according to the review aggregator GameRankings. In February 2008, Super Mario Galaxy received the "Adventure Game of the Year" award during the AIAS 11th Annual Interactive Achievement Awards; it also received nominations for "Overall Game of the Year", "Console Game of the Year", "Outstanding Achievement in Game Design", "Outstanding Achievement in Gameplay Engineering" and "Outstanding Innovation in Gaming". Super Mario Galaxy placed third in the Official Nintendo Magazine's "100 greatest Nintendo games of all time" list. In 2009, the game won the "Game of the Year" BAFTA at the 5th British Academy Games Awards, surpassing Call of Duty 4: Modern Warfare and becoming the first Nintendo game to win this award, whilst in the same year, Super Mario Galaxy was named the number one Wii game by IGN. It was also named by Eurogamer and IGN as the "Game of the Generation". In 2015, the game placed 11th on USgamer's "15 Best Games Since 2000" list. Guinness World Records ranked Super Mario Galaxy 29th in their list of top 50 console games of all time based on initial impact and lasting legacy. In their final issue, the Official Nintendo Magazine ranked Super Mario Galaxy as the greatest Nintendo game of all time. The soundtrack also won the "Best Design in Audio" award from Edge.

== Legacy ==
=== Sequel ===
In the 1,000th issue of Famitsu, Miyamoto expressed his interest in making a sequel to Super Mario Galaxy. The game was originally called "Super Mario Galaxy More" during development, and was initially going to feature variations of planets featured in Super Mario Galaxy. Over time, new elements and ideas were brought into the game, and it was decided that the game would be a full sequel. Super Mario Galaxy 2 was announced during the Nintendo conference at E3 2009 held in Los Angeles. It was released on 23 May 2010 in North America, 27 May in Japan and on 11 June in Europe. The sequel has been met with as much critical acclaim as its predecessor, and has sold 6.36 million copies worldwide as of April 2011.

=== Ports ===
Super Mario Galaxy, as well as several other Wii games, was re-released for Nvidia's Shield TV in China on 22 March 2018 as the result of a partnership between Nintendo, Nvidia and iQiyi. The game runs on the Shield via an emulator, but has interface and control modifications and support for 1080p resolution. Due to the lack of motion controls on the Shield, some controls are remapped; for example, the on-screen pointer is remapped to the right analogue stick and the button to choose a Galaxy is remapped to the right trigger.

The game is included alongside Super Mario 64 and Super Mario Sunshine in the Super Mario 3D All-Stars collection, which was released on 18 September 2020 for the Nintendo Switch.

To commemorate the 40th anniversary of Super Mario Bros., an enhanced version of Super Mario Galaxy was released for the Nintendo Switch on 2 October 2025. The game is available as part of a collection with its sequel, as well as being sold separately on the Nintendo eShop. The Switch version runs at 1080p resolution, and up to 4K resolution on the Nintendo Switch 2 via a free update. Additional content in the version includes an assist mode and a new chapter of Rosalina's storybook. A pair of Amiibo for the game was released on 2 April 2026, which can be scanned to receive items in the game. A hardcover book version of Rosalina's storybook was also made available separately, though it does not contain the new story content added in the Switch version.

=== Film ===
On 12 September 2025, it was revealed in a Nintendo Direct presentation that the sequel to The Super Mario Bros. Movie (2023) would be titled The Super Mario Galaxy Movie, which was released on 1 April 2026.
