= Konjaku Gazu Zoku Hyakki =

Second book of the Gazu Hyakki Yagyō tetralogy

Konjaku Gazu Zoku Hyakki (今昔画図続百鬼; "The Illustrated One Hundred Demons from the Present and the Past") is the second book of Japanese artist Toriyama Sekien's famous Gazu Hyakki Yagyō tetralogy, published c. 1779. A version of the tetralogy translated and annotated in English was published in 2016. These books are supernatural bestiaries, collections of ghosts, spirits, spooks, and monsters, many of which Toriyama based on literature, folklore, other artwork. These works have had a profound influence on subsequent yōkai imagery in Japan. Konjaku Gazu Zoku Hyakki is preceded in the series by Gazu Hyakki Yagyō, and succeeded by Konjaku Hyakki Shūi and Gazu Hyakki Tsurezure Bukuro.

== List of creatures ==
The three volumes were titled 雨, 晦, and 明. From this book, Toriyama added captions.

=== First Volume – 雨 (Rain) ===
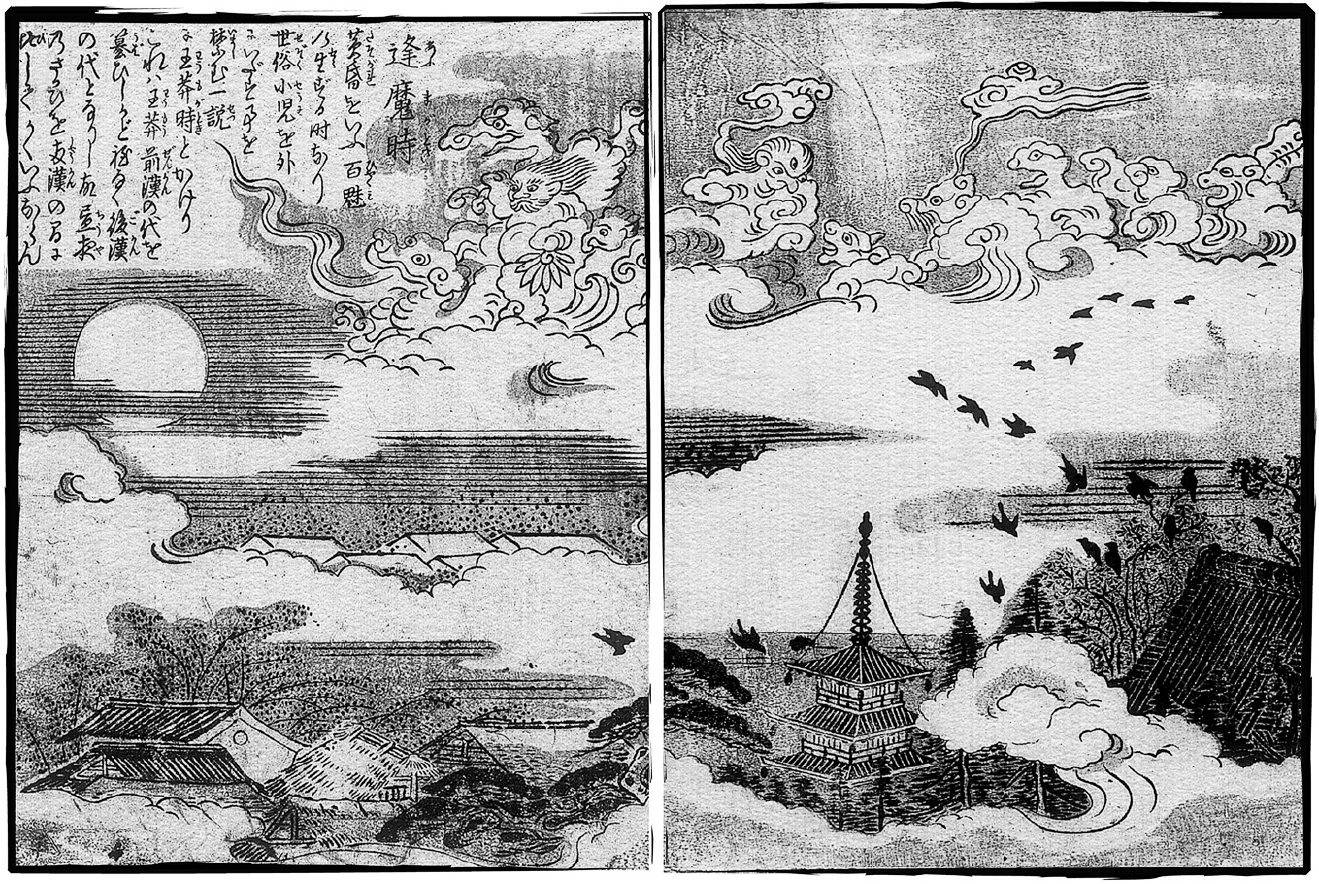
Ōmagatoki (逢魔時)

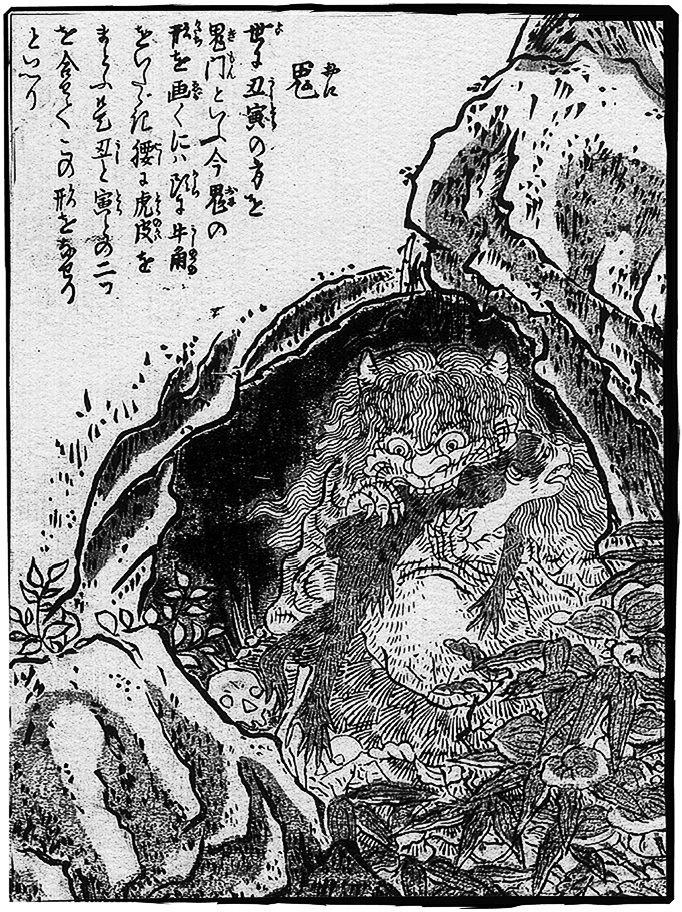
Oni (鬼)

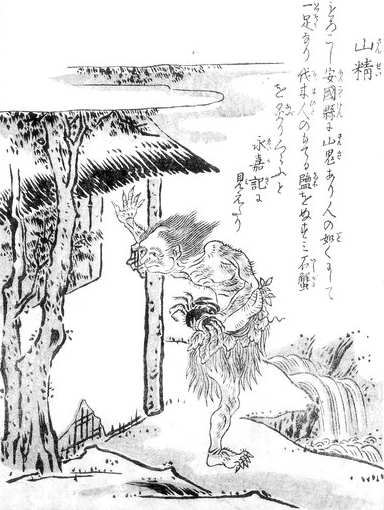
Sansei (ja:山精)

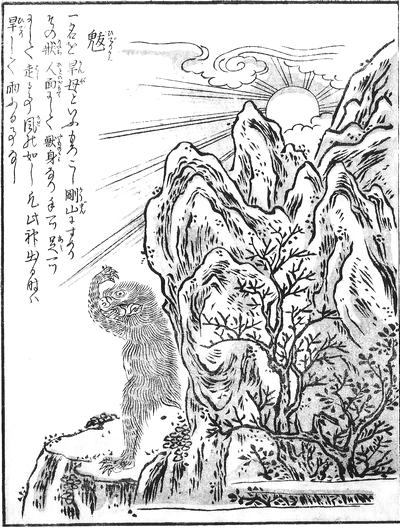
Hiderigami (魃)

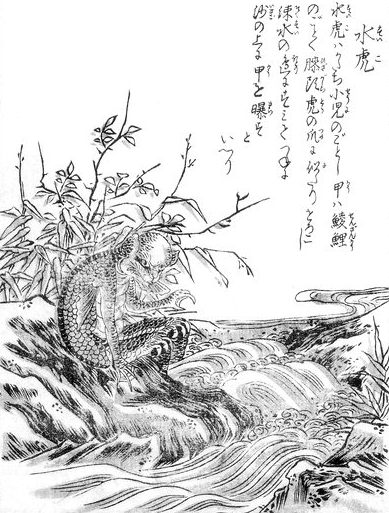
Suiko (ja:水虎, water tiger)

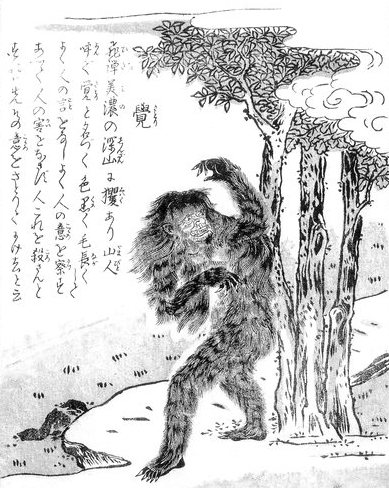
Satori (覚)

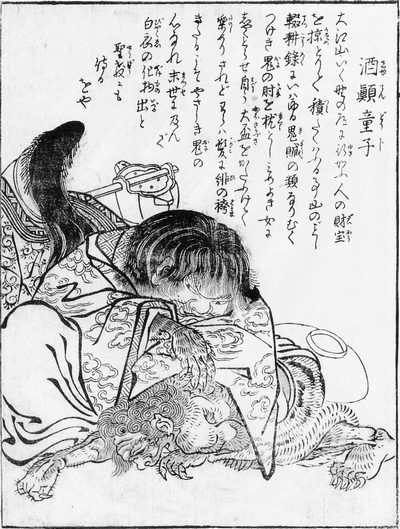
Shuten-dōji (酒顛童子)

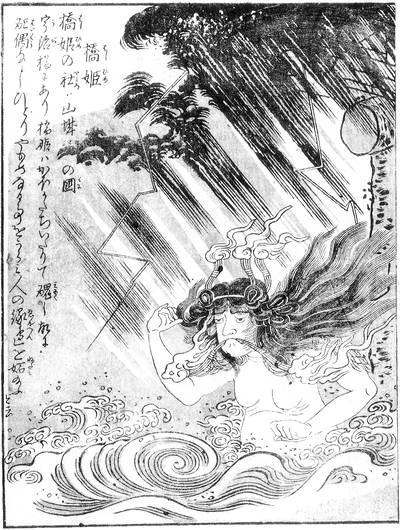
Hashihime (橋姫)

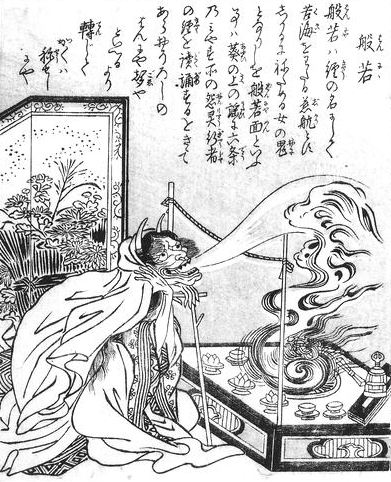
Hannya (般若)

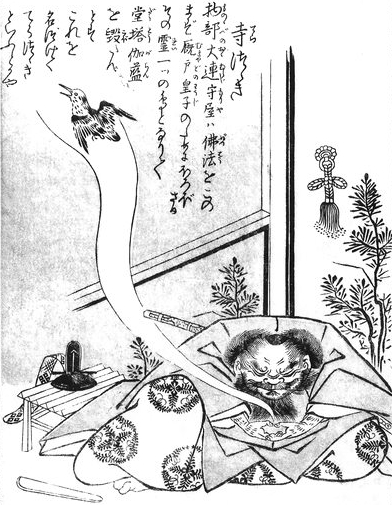
Teratsutsuki (ja:寺つつき)

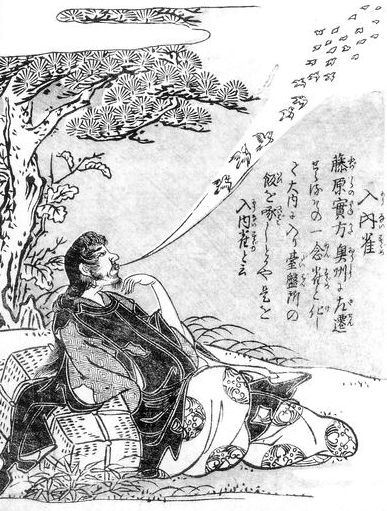
Nyūnaisuzume (ja:入内雀)

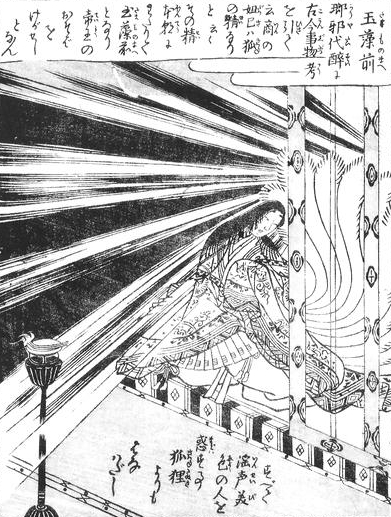
Tamamo-no-Mae (玉藻前)

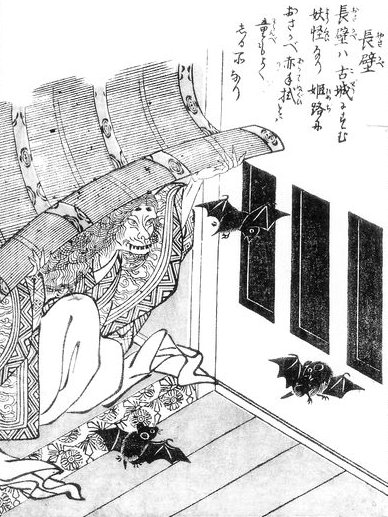
Osakabe (長壁)

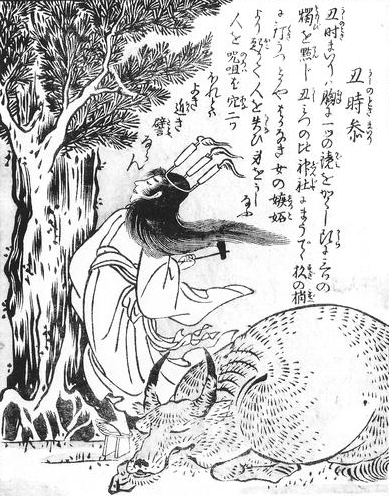
Ushi no toki mairi (ja:丑時参)

=== Second Volume – 晦 (Dark) ===
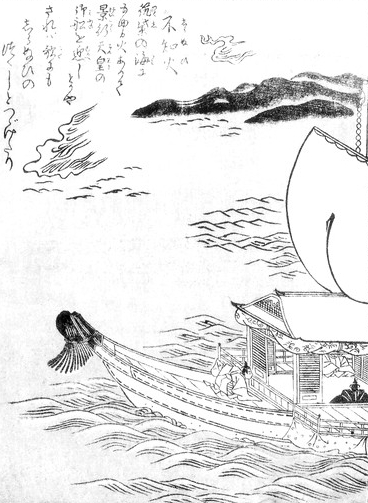
Shiranui (不知火)

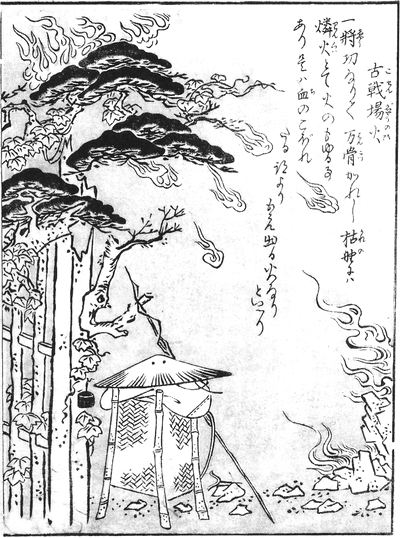
Kosenjōbi (ja:古戦場火)

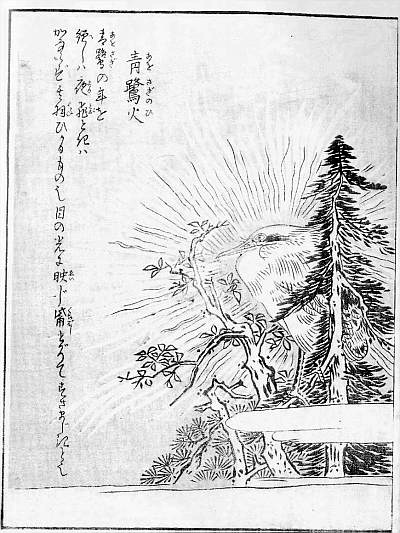
Aosagibi (青鷺火)

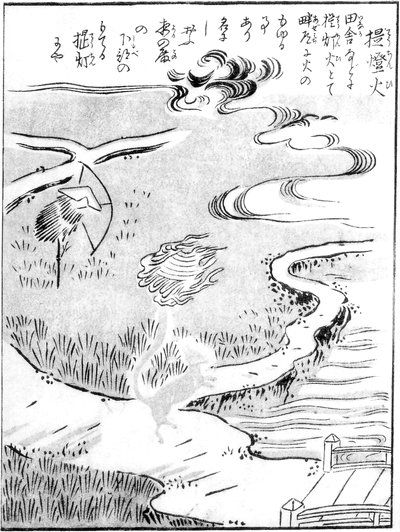
Chōchinbi (ja:提灯火)

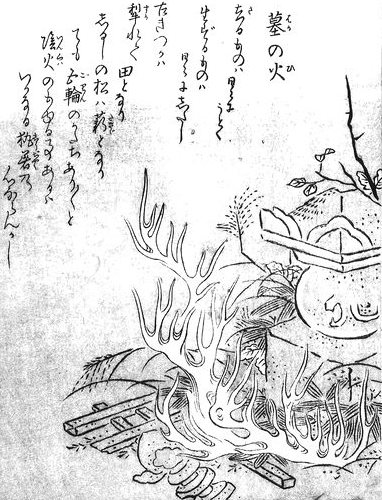
Hakanohi (ja:墓の火)

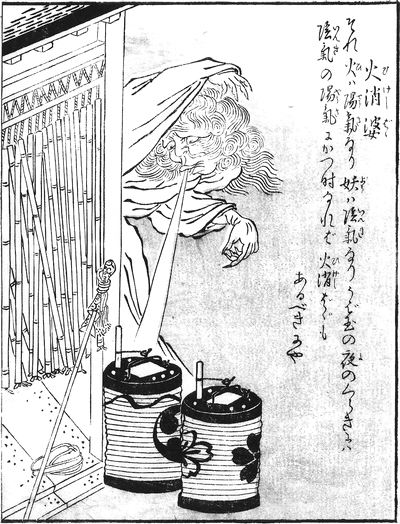
Hikeshibaba (ja:火消婆)

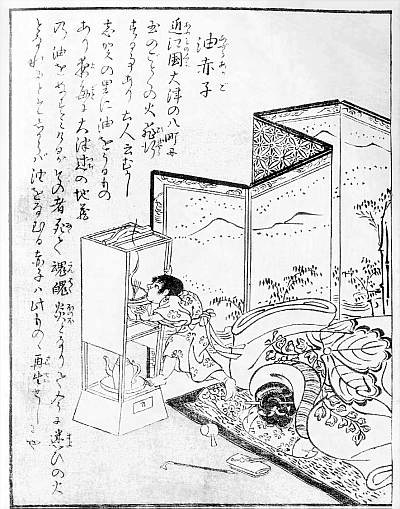
Abura-akago (油赤子)

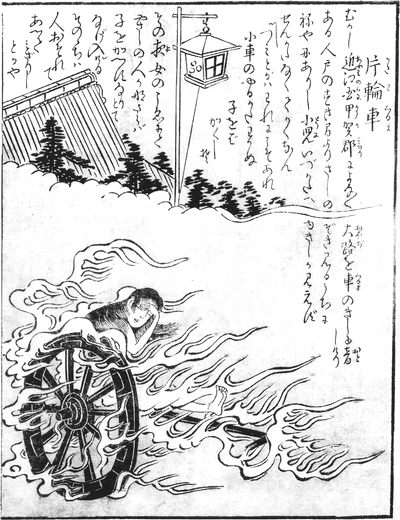
Katawaguruma (ja:片輪車)

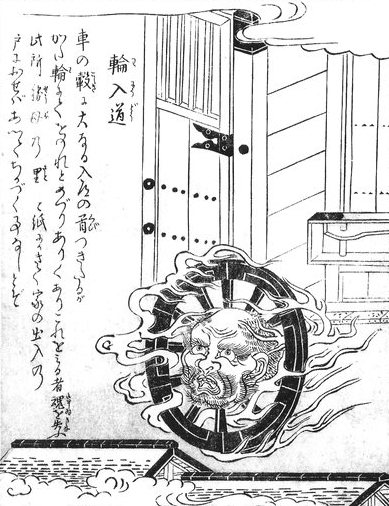
Wanyūdō (ja:輪入道)

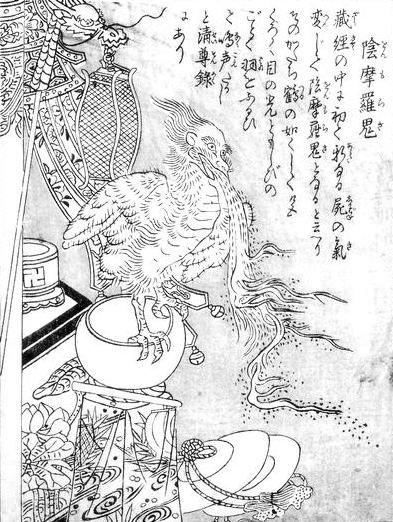
Onmoraki (ja:陰摩羅鬼)

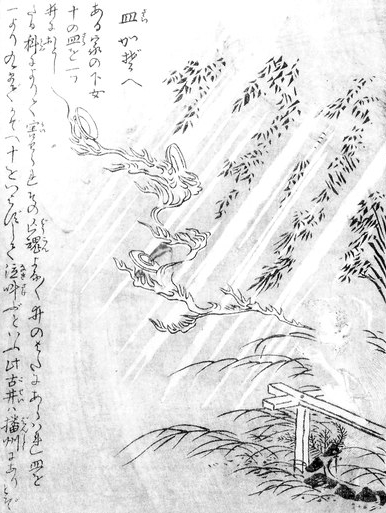
Sarakazoe (ja:皿数え)

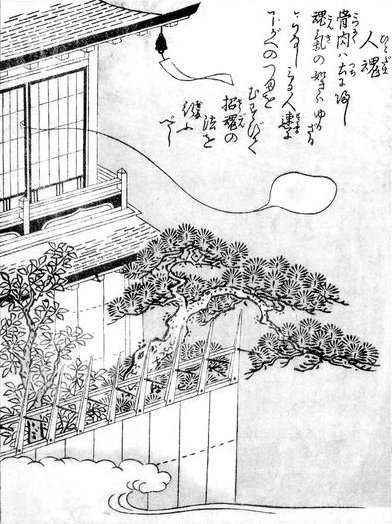
Hitodama (人魂)

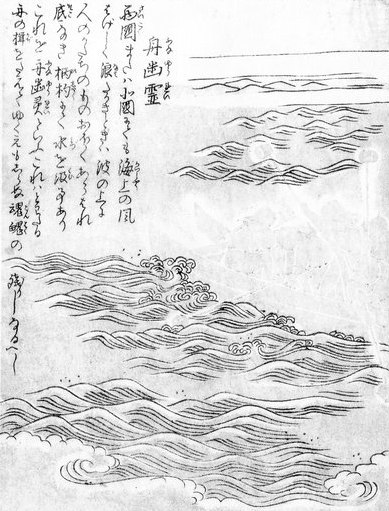
Funayūrei (船幽霊)

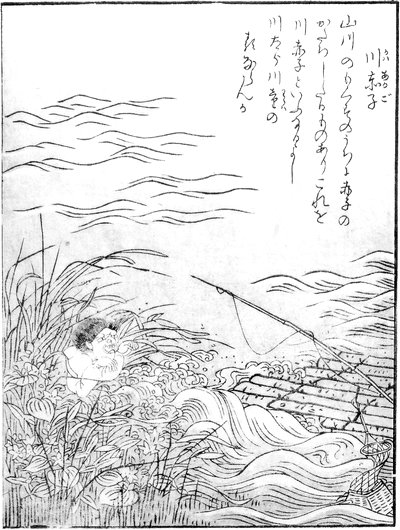
Kawaakago (ja:川赤子)

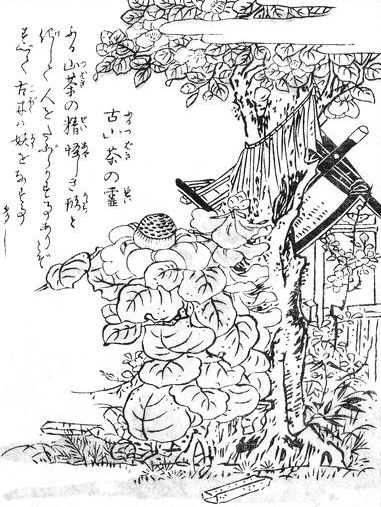
Furutsubaki-no-rei (ja:古山茶の霊)

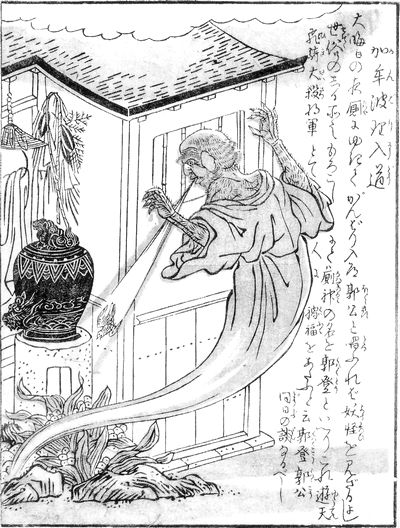
Kambarinyūdō (ja:加牟波理入道)

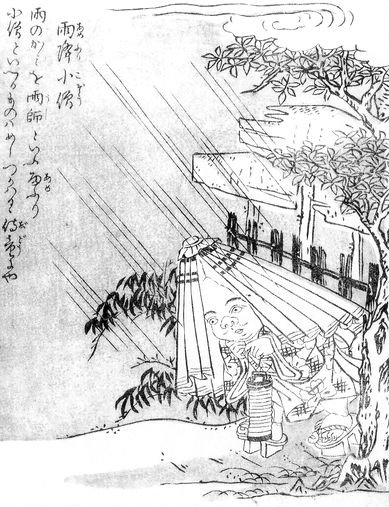
Amefurikozō (雨降小僧)

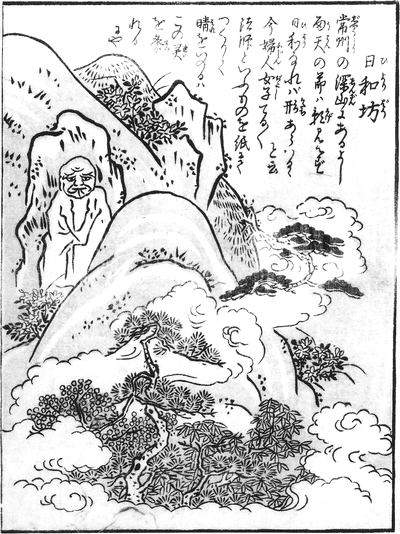
Hiyoribō (ja:日和坊)

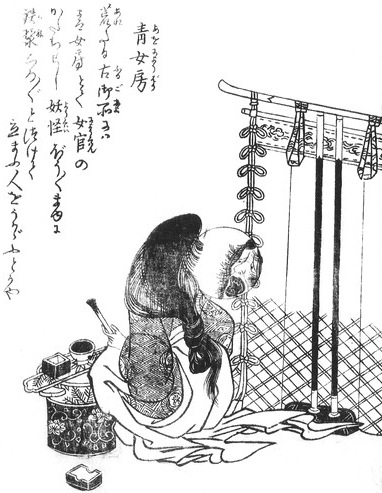
Aonyōbō (青女房)

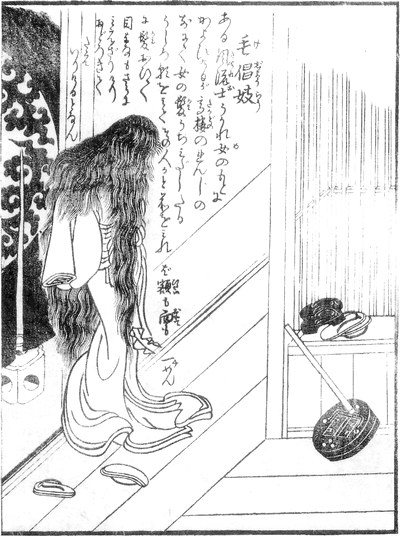
Kejōrō (ja:毛倡妓)

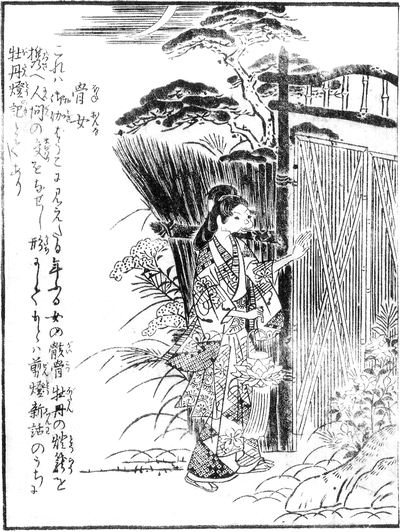
Hone-onna (骨女)

=== Third Volume – 明 (Dawn) ===
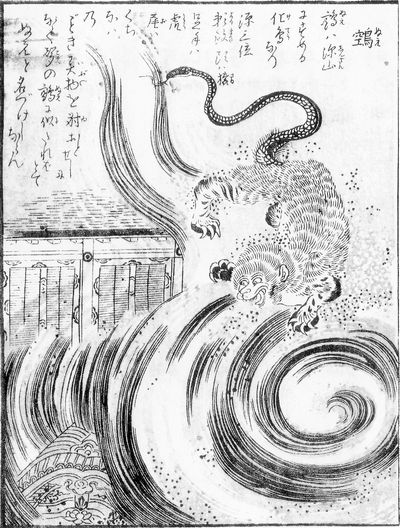
Nue (鵺)

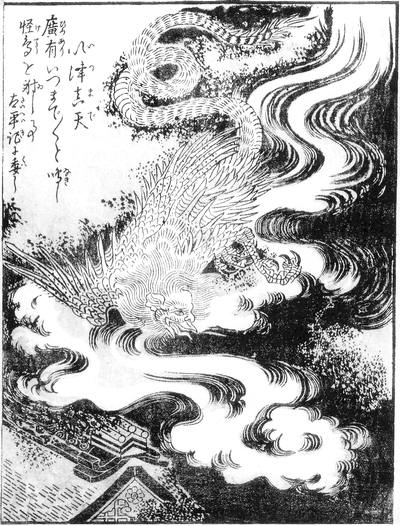
Itsumade (ja:以津真天)

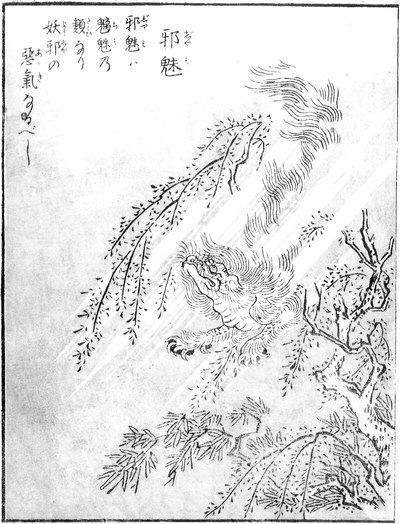
Jami (ja:邪魅)

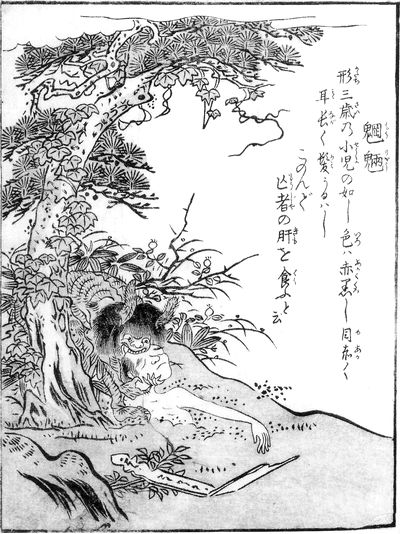
Mōryō (ja:魍魎)

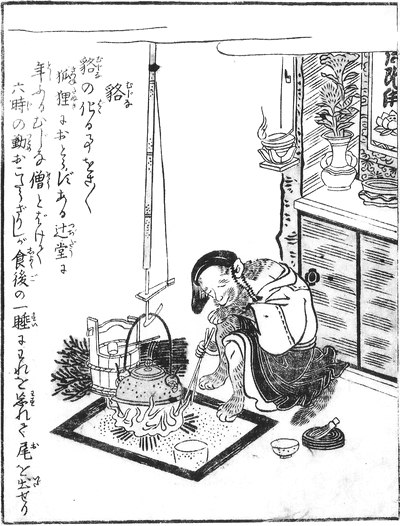
Mujina (貉)

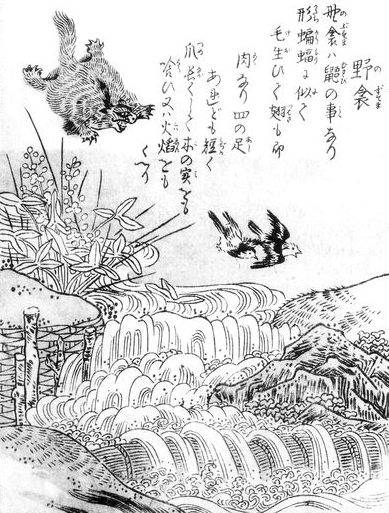
Nobusuma (ja:野衾)

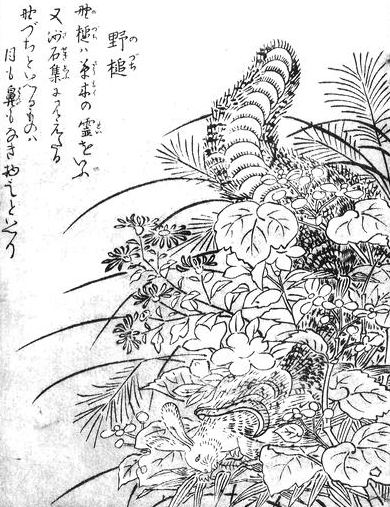
Nozuchi (ja:野槌)

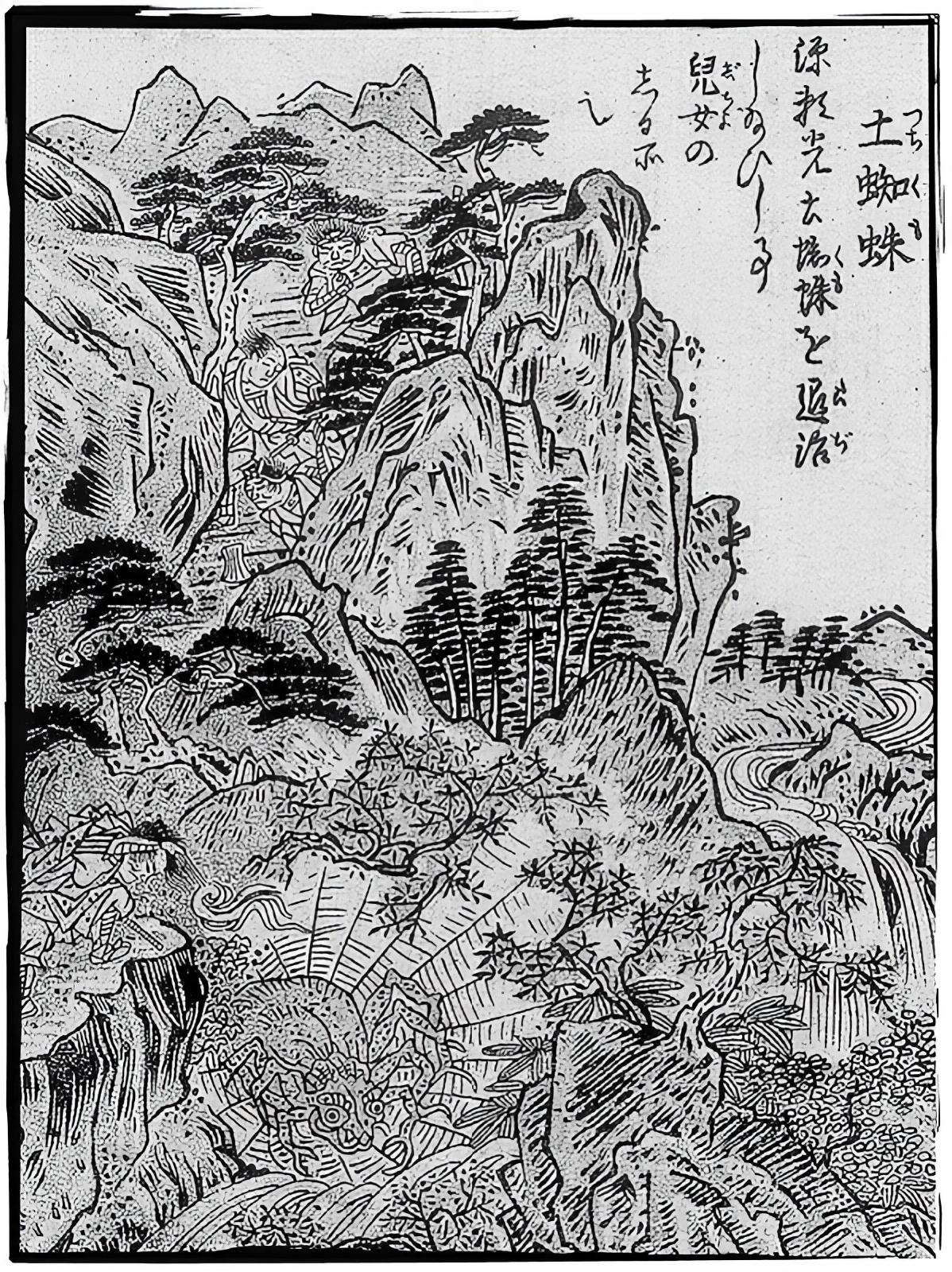
Tsuchigumo (土蜘蛛)

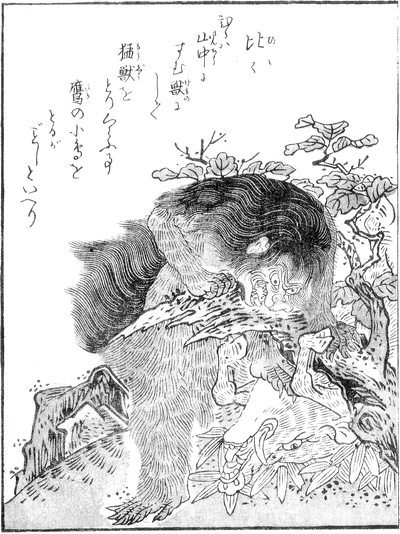
Hihi (比々)

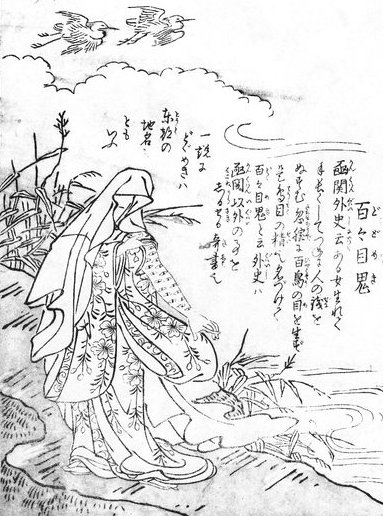
Dodomeki (ja:百々目鬼)

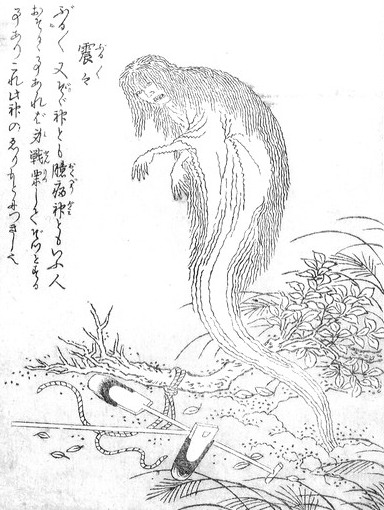
Buruburu (ja:震々)

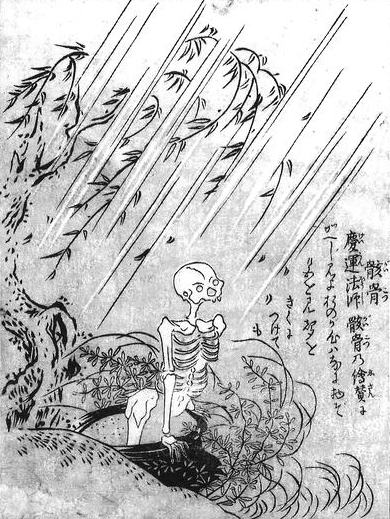
Gaikotsu (ja:骸骨)

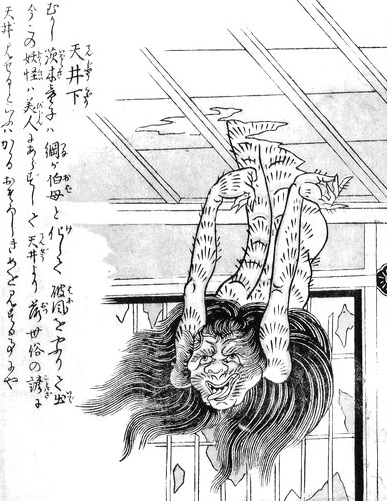
Tenjōkudari (ja:天井下)

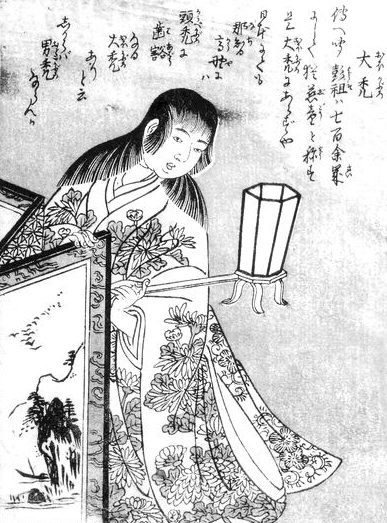
Ōkaburo (ja:大禿)

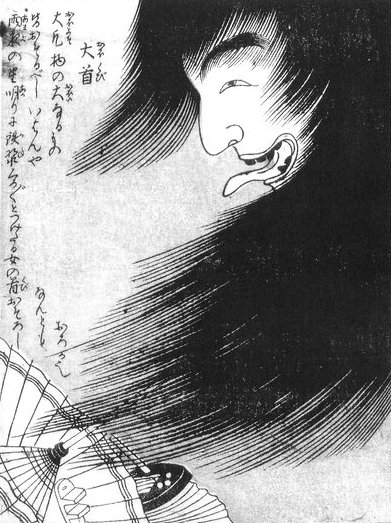
Ōkubi (大首)

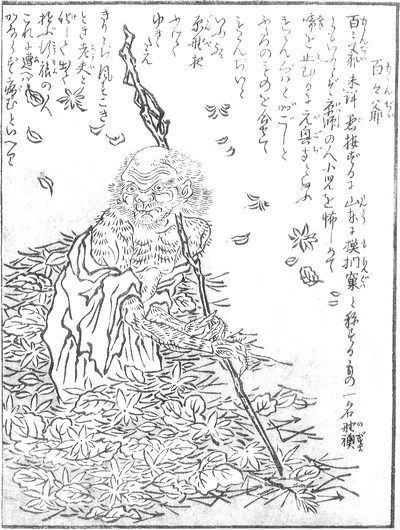
Momonjī (ja:百々爺)

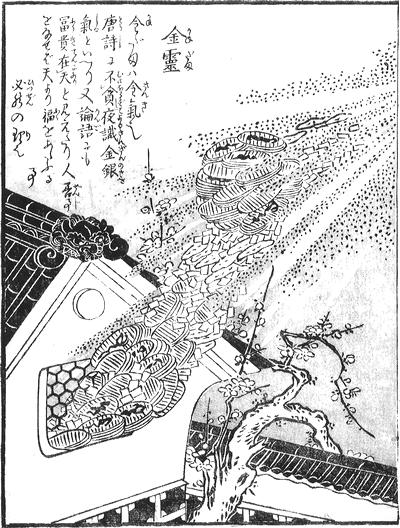
Kanedama (ja:金霊)

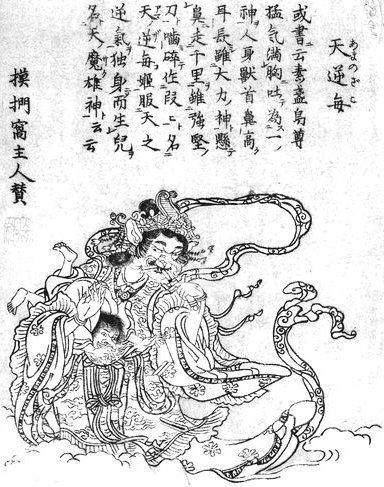
Amanozako (天逆毎)

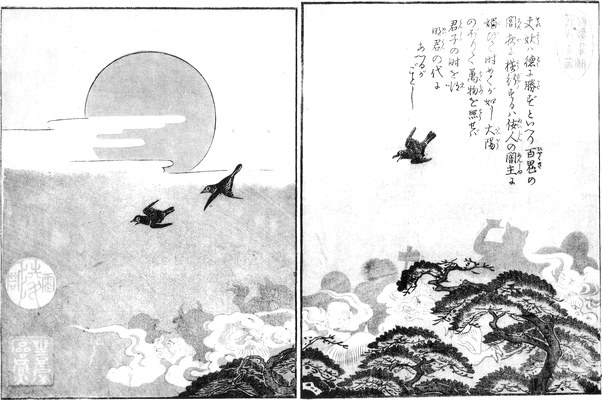
Hinode (日の出)

== See also ==
- Gazu Hyakki Tsurezure Bukuro
- Gazu Hyakki Yagyō
- Konjaku Hyakki Shūi
