= Warriors Orochi 3 =

2011 video game

- Developer: Omega Force
- Publisher: Tecmo Koei
- Director: Shigeto Nakadai
- Designer: Tomohiko Aoki
- Programmer: Hiroshi Noda
- Composers: Masato Koike; Miki Fujii
- Series: Dynasty Warriors; Samurai Warriors; Warriors Orochi
- Platforms: PlayStation 3 Xbox 360; PlayStation Portable; Wii U PlayStation Vita; PlayStation 4 Xbox One; Nintendo Switch; Microsoft Windows
- Release: PlayStation 3, Xbox 360: JP: December 22, 2011; NA: March 20, 2012; EU: April 6, 2012; PlayStation Portable: JP: July 19, 2012; Wii U: NA: November 18, 2012; EU: November 30, 2012; JP: December 8, 2012; Ultimate; PlayStation 3, PS Vita: JP: September 26, 2013; NA: September 2, 2014; EU: September 5, 2014; PlayStation 4: JP: June 26, 2014; NA: September 2, 2014; EU: September 5, 2014; Xbox One: NA: September 2, 2014; JP: September 4, 2014; EU: September 5, 2014; Nintendo Switch: JP: November 9, 2017; Microsoft Windows: WW: July 12, 2022 (Definitive Edition)
- Genre: Hack and slash
- Modes: Single-player, multiplayer

Warriors Orochi 3, originally released as Musō Orochi 2 (無双OROCHI 2, Musō Orochi Tsū) in Japan, is a 2011 hack and slash video game developed by Tecmo Koei and Omega Force for the PlayStation 3 and Xbox 360. It is the fourth installment of the crossover series Warriors Orochi, a combination of the Dynasty Warriors and Samurai Warriors series, and a sequel to Warriors Orochi 2. The game was released in Japan in 2011, and in Europe and North America in 2012 (PlayStation 3, Xbox 360).

There are two ports of the game: Musou Orochi 2 Special (Musō Orochi 2 Special (無双OROCHI 2 Special, Musō Orochi Tsū Special)), released in 2012 for PlayStation Portable exclusively in Japan, and Warriors Orochi 3 Hyper (Musō Orochi 2 Hyper (無双OROCHI 2 Hyper, Musō Orochi Tsū Hyper)), which was released as a launch title for the Wii U for Japan, North America, and Europe. An updated version, Warriors Orochi 3 Ultimate (Musō Orochi 2 Ultimate (無双OROCHI 2 Ultimate, Musō Orochi Tsū Ultimate)), was released for the PlayStation 3 and PlayStation Vita in Japan in 2013 with PlayStation 4 and Xbox One ports released in 2014. The four versions were also released in North America and Europe in 2014. An additional port for the Nintendo Switch was released exclusively in Japan in 2017. A definitive edition of the game Warriors Orochi 3 Ultimate Definitive Edition was released worldwide for Microsoft Windows via Steam in July 2022. Unlike previous titles, Warriors Orochi 3 only features Japanese voices.

== Gameplay ==
The gameplay of Warriors Orochi 3 is similar to that of the two titles that the Warriors Orochi 3 takes its characters from: namely Dynasty Warriors 7 (specifically, Dynasty Warriors Next) and Samurai Warriors 3. Characters from either of these series play similar to how they play in their respective source games, but with a number of changes to unify the two different games together, including:

- Dynasty Warriors characters are solely armed with one weapon, and cannot switch to another one, but the weapon given to each character is their EX weapon from the series. Characters who have changed their EX weapons in Dynasty Warriors 7: Empires (which was released after Warriors Orochi 3, but before Ultimate) retain their older EX weapons in Ultimate instead of changing to their new EX weapons.
- Dynasty Warriors characters are restricted to one Musou attack. Characters with a ground and aerial Musou attack in Dynasty Warriors 7 retain their ground Musou attack, while characters having two ground Musou attacks may retain either of theirs as their Musou attack.
- As movesets are determined by weapon in Dynasty Warriors 7 rather than by character, characters sharing the same weapon in Dynasty Warriors 7 have altered charge attacks to differentiate them from each other.
- Samurai Warriors characters perform their Ultimate Musou attack in situations where the True Musou attack is available, to compensate for the lack of the Spirit Gauge.
- Samurai Warriors characters gain new Switch attacks, akin to weapon switching in Dynasty Warriors 7, for their use in Switch Combos.

For characters who are from neither of the two series, whether or not the character is of Japanese origin determines whether their Musou attack corresponds to that of the Dynasty Warriors or the Samurai Warriors cast. Characters new to Warriors Orochi also have movesets based on their overall character type in this regard: for example, some of non-Japanese origin characters like Nemea, whose moveset is based on a Dynasty Warriors 7 weapon unused by anyone in that roster, have an EX attack like Dynasty Warriors characters, while some of Japanese-origin characters like Kaguya has the longer, standard attack chain reminiscent of a character from the Samurai Warriors roster.

Gameplay takes place on modified versions of stages taken primarily from Dynasty Warriors 7 or Samurai Warriors 3 (in addition, some downloadable content and story elements in Ultimate take place in stages taken from Warriors Orochi 2); a select number of stages relevant to the story are new stages. Each of the new "collaboration characters" (Ryu Hayabusa, Ayane, Joan of Arc, Nemea, Achilles, Rachel, Momiji, Kasumi, Sterkenburg, and Sophitia) is also associated with a stage taken from either Dynasty Warriors 7 or Samurai Warriors 3, with graphical modifications made to resemble their game of origin. Much of the stage music is taken from earlier Dynasty Warriors, Samurai Warriors, or Warriors Orochi games; each of the collaboration characters is also associated with a unique theme.

New mechanics for the Warriors Orochi series include:

- In addition to Power, Speed, and Technique, a new character attack type, "Wonder", is available.
- Like Dynasty Warriors 7, there is a central base from which characters organize their missions. The base initially contains a weapons dealer and a network assistant for multiplayer play, but can be expanded to include a teahouse.
- A modified version of the Bond system from Dynasty Warriors 7 is introduced. Bonds between two characters are formed through being allied in battle, being opponents in battle, being teammates in battle, or by completing a mission set forth by an ally in battle (failure to complete a mission weakens the bond between two characters). As new chapters are unlocked, bonds between characters may be raised by paying gems at the teahouse.
- Each character is associated with a number of other characters considered to be "special relationships"; as the bond between the two characters increase, new support conversations may appear whenever the player controls either character in the central base. Special relationships span many different types, including family, adversarial, based on earlier Warriors Orochi series titles, or based on events in Story Mode.
- As with Dynasty Warriors 7, the morale gauge is no longer present.
- As with Samurai Warriors 3, each character is associated with four levels of weapons; a fifth level of weapon is available in Ultimate by fulfilling certain stage conditions on hard, as with past Warriors games.
- Players may switch characters as they are attacking. This technique, known as a "Switch Combo", allows the combo counter of the outgoing character to be transferred to the incoming character, who performs a special switch attack when they are switched in. This, however, consumes a portion of the incoming character's Musou gauge. There is also a variation called the "Triple Rush" attack which is only available in the Ultimate update. A team of 3 specific characters will also result in creating a unique attack within the "Triple Rush" feature.
- Characters may perform new attacks such as "Break Guard" and "Dash Chain".
- A new gauge has been introduced, the True Triple Attack gauge, which fills as a player deals damage to enemies. For a short period of time after the True Triple Attack is initiated, all enemies will move in slow motion. The strength of the True Triple Attack is determined by the overall bond between the three characters.
- Two-player co-op is available with both players permitted to use different teams. For Warriors Orochi 3 Hyper, the Wii U Gamepad may be used for one of the players, allowing the other player to play in full-screen.
- A new mode, "Musou Battlefield", allows the modification of existing stages and sharing of modifications online. Players have a limited number of "edit points", where they may replace characters, add more aggressive enemy behaviour, and alter game audio. Ultimate removes the need for edit points to alter the changes and the players can also customize the battle quotes and combat notifications in-game.
- Hyper has a new Duel Mode, allowing players to battle each other in three-on-three battles. Players must choose in addition four Strategy Cards, which may be activated over the course of a duel: each Strategy Card costs a number of Battle Points (gained over time during a battle) per use. Each character has two Strategy Cards available for use; one is made available by unlocking the character, while the second is made available through other means.
- Ultimate adds a new Gauntlet Mode, where players can set a party of five characters instead of three.
- Downloadable content, allowing for new character costumes, scenarios, weapons, and music, is available for all platforms. Downloadable content from Dynasty Warriors 7 and Samurai Warriors 3 cannot be used in Warriors Orochi 3; the same content must be repurchased for specific use by this game.

== Characters ==
All characters from Warriors Orochi 2 and Musou Orochi Z return in this game. Unlike the first two games (which the costumes for the characters from Dynasty Warriors 5 and Samurai Warriors 2 are used), the costumes for the characters are taken from Dynasty Warriors 7: Xtreme Legends and Sengoku Musou 3 Z. Characters not present in either game use visuals from the last game in which they appeared.

Four new characters were initially available in the original PlayStation 3 version. An additional seven were added through various expansions of the game:

- Kaguya (かぐや) (Technique): A graceful and elegant young mystic who descends to the dimensional world following the chaos wrought upon by the Hydra. Armed with the miraculous ability to traverse time, she helps the three remaining heroes to save their comrades from certain death and to fight back against the bewitched serpent beast. Throughout the game, she begins to develop a sense of friendship with humanity, which helps against her initially repressive side. She wields sakaki and mirrors.
- Shuten Dōji (酒呑童子) (Wonder): A mighty warrior of strength and intimidating presence. The two horns extending from the top of his head suggest something superhuman about him, but he himself knows nothing of his own identity, save for his name. Driven by the desire to understand who he is, he takes to the battlefield. Eventually, it is revealed that he is actually a part of Orochi's soul, separated from him when he was reborn as the Hydra, and thus is vital for the Coalition to fight back the serpent beast. He wields a giant gourd.
- Nezha (哪咤) (Speed): A young mystic born between the human and mystic realms. After initially being killed in an earlier battle, he is resurrected by the high mystic Susano'o as his aide, helping him to capture Da Ji, although his ways of finding becomes some sort of terror against humanity. The prequel chapter reveals that he was actually killed by Orochi. He wields four discs known as Elephant Rings (bladed rings attached to the wrists and ankles). In his human form, only available in the Ultimate update, he wields the Fire Tip Lance.
- Susano'o (素戔嗚) (Power): The leader of the Mystic Army who has finally deigned to make an appearance in this land of turmoil. He has unwavering confidence in his own strength, and the complete trust of his subordinates. This leads, however, to a contemptuous attitude towards human beings. He is pursuing Da Ji in order to thwart her plans to resurrect Orochi, although his apathetic and militaristic attitude to find her becomes a sort of amusement to the mystics. He wields the Ama-no-Murakumo-no-Tsurugi.
- Seimei Abe (安倍清明) (Wonder): A member of the aristocratic Abe clan, a clan which has ties to the Japanese imperial throne. Disgusted by humanity and their vanity, he willingly entered the dimensional realm through time distortion. He wields a wood folding fan and a white fox spirit (available in Special, Hyper, and Ultimate only).
- Shennong (神農) (Wonder): One of the Three Sovereigns who is renowned for having taught China not only the practice of agriculture, but also the use of herbal drugs. He was content to stay in the mystic realm until he notices the humanity's struggle in the dimensional realm. He decides to descend with the other mystics to provide help for humanity. He wields Zhebian (Red Whip) (available in Hyper and Ultimate only).
- Mae Tamamo (玉藻前) (Wonder): A legendary kitsune who is said to be the most beautiful and intelligent woman in Japan. After the Hydra had been defeated, she appears in the dimensional world in rock form, which is eventually found by the Orochi Army. Armed with scrolls and the mysterious sacred mirror, she enjoys toying the warriors before allying herself with Da Ji and the resurrected Orochi, while hiding her own personal agenda. Mae's true form is actually the mythical nine-tailed fox, Kyūbi no Kitsune (available in Ultimate only).
- Yinglong (応龍) (Power): A powerful mystic entrusted with exterminating demons in the mystic realm, he appears in the "Tale of the Former Day" prequel chapter, set long before the events of the series starts. Following an event in which he rebelled against the Tiandi and broke his sacred mirror, he was transformed into Orochi, who would become the main antagonist of the series. He wields Twin Dragon Sword (available in Ultimate only).
- Kyūbi no Kitsune (九尾の狐) (Wonder): The mythical nine-tailed fox, in actuality the true form of a fox spirit, Mae Tamamo, she wields her nine tails and robes (available in Ultimate only).
- Hundun (渾沌) (Power): One of the Four Fiends, considered the source of primordial chaos in Chinese mythology, he does not appear in the story, but instead appears as the final boss of the game's Gauntlet Mode. He wields four hatchets (available in Ultimate only).
- Hydra (妖蛇): The "world will" of Orochi's raw power, taking the form of a giant eight-headed serpent beast dubbed as "Hydra" (Youja in Japanese), it was born after Orochi was defeated at the end of the second game. Its appearance has caused disasters and the deaths of warriors in the dimensional realm. It is unplayable in the game, serving only as the game boss.

The game also include collaboration characters from other Tecmo Koei franchises: Ninja Gaiden, Bladestorm: The Hundred Years' War, Warriors: Legends of Troy, Dead or Alive, Trinity: Souls of Zill O'll, and Atelier. It also has a character from Soulcalibur, a Namco Bandai series. Those characters appear and star in their own alternate version of stages within the game. The following collaboration characters are:

- Ryu Hayabusa (Power): A young member of the Hayabusa ninja clan, and heir to the Dragon lineage. While battling the forces of evil with the legendary Dragon Sword, he was suddenly dragged into the fissure in time and space which appeared at the same time as the Hydra, but even in this alternate universe, he continues his fight against evil. Ryu wields the Dragon Sword and appears at Anegawa.
- Joan of Arc (Wonder): Maid of Orleans, and national heroine of France. A kind young woman with a strong sense of justice, she vowed to stand up and fight for the people of France in the Hundred Years' War. On the field of battle, she saw a unit of her forces sucked into the rift in time and space, and in an attempt to rescue them, she too was transported to this alternate universe. Joan wields a lance and appears at Mt Dingjun.
- Achilles (Power): A tragic hero of the Trojan War, and the greatest of all the Greek warriors, he is the central character of Homer's Iliad. Achilles bears unlimited fury on those who are foolish enough to kill his loved ones. Although it is prophesied that he will die in the battlefield if he goes to war, he willingly joins the forces of his allies to become immortal through his heroic and glorious (kleos) acts. He wields a xiphos and appears at Nanzhong.
- Nemea (Technique): Pulled into the dimensional realm after the events of Trinity: Souls of Zill O'll, Nemea wields a spear and appears at Kyushu.
- Rachel (Power): While doing her usual rounds, she was suddenly sucked into the dimensional realm through time distortion. Rachel wields Inferno Hammer and Type 666 Heavy Machine Gun and appears at Jiangdong (available in Special, Hyper, and Ultimate only).
- Kasumi (Speed): While tracking her clone, Alpha-152, she was sucked through time distortion and arrived at the dimensional realm. She wields a wakizashi named "Shrouded Moon" and appears at Yan Province (available in Ultimate only).
- Ayane (Speed): Mysteriously teleported to the dimensional realm after the events of Dead or Alive 4, Ayane wields the Fūma Kodachi and appears at Hasedo.
- Momiji (Technique): She appeared in the dimensional realm through time distortion while guarding her post. She wields Heavenly Dragon Naginata and Heavensong Bow and appears at Wan Castle (available in Hyper and Ultimate only).
- Sterkenburg Cranach (Power): Mysteriously transported to the dimensional realm after the events of Atelier Meruru: The Apprentice of Arland, he wields Longsword and appears at Xu Province (available in Ultimate only).
- Sophitia Alexandra (Technique): While going home with her child after the events of Soulcalibur IV, she was sucked to the dimensional world through time distortion. She wields Omega Sword and Elk Shield and appears at Liaodong (available in Ultimate only).

In addition to all 96 characters from Warriors Orochi 2 and Musou Orochi Z, there are a total of 145 characters in this game.

* Denotes new characters to the series.

** Denotes new characters added through expansions

Bold denotes default characters.

Wei	Wu	Shu	Jin	Other 1	Other 2	Samurai 1	Samurai 2	Samurai 3
Cai Wenji*	Daqiao	Bao Sanniang*	Deng Ai*	Da Ji	Achilles*	Hanzō Hattori	Ginchiyo Tachibana	Aya*
Cao Cao	Ding Feng*	Guan Ping	Guo Huai*	Diaochan	Ayane*	Hideyoshi Toyotomi	Ieyasu Tokugawa	Goemon Ishikawa
Cao Pi	Gan Ning	Guan Suo*	Sima Shi*	Dong Zhuo	Benkei	Kenshin Uesugi	Ina	Gracia
Cao Ren	Huang Gai	Guan Yu	Sima Yi	Fu Xi	Dodomeki	Keiji Maeda	Kanetsugu Naoe	**Hanbei Takenaka***
Dian Wei	Lianshi*	Huang Zhong	**Sima Zhao***	Kiyomori Taira	Gyuki	Kunoichi	Kotarō Fūma	Kai*
Guo Jia*	Ling Tong	Jiang Wei	Wang Yuanji*	Lu Bu	Himiko	Magoichi Saika	Mitsunari Ishida	Katsuie Shibata
Jia Xu*	Lu Meng	Liu Bei	Xiahou Ba*	Meng Huo	Hundun**	Masamune Date	Motochika Chōsokabe	Kanbei Kuroda*
Pang De	Lu Xun	Liu Shan*	Zhong Hui*	Nuwa	Joan of Arc*	Mitsuhide Akechi	Nagamasa Azai	Kiyomasa Katō*
Wang Yi*	Sun Ce	**Ma Chao**	Zhuge Dan*	Orochi	Kaguya*	Nobunaga Oda	Nene	Kojirō Sasaki
Xiahou Dun	Sun Jian	Ma Dai*		Sun Wukong	Kasumi**	Nō	Sakon Shima	Masanori Fukushima*
Xiahou Yuan	Sun Quan	Pang Tong		Taigong Wang	Kyūbi**	Oichi	Tadakatsu Honda	Muneshige Tachibana*
Xu Huang	Sun Shangxiang	Wei Yan		Yoshitsune Minamoto	Momiji**	Okuni	Toshiie Maeda	Musashi Miyamoto
Xu Zhu	Taishi Ci	Xingcai		Yuan Shao	Nemea*	Ranmaru Mori	Yoshihiro Shimazu	Motonari Mōri*
Zhang He	Xiaoqiao	Xu Shu**		Zhang Jiao	Nezha*	Shingen Takeda	Yoshimoto Imagawa	Ujiyasu Hōjō*
Zhang Liao	Zhou Tai	Yueying		Zhurong	Nezha (Human)**	Yukimura Sanada		
Zhenji	Zhou Yu	Zhang Fei		Zuo Ci	Orochi X			
		Zhao Yun			Rachel**			
		Zhuge Liang			Ryu Hayabusa*			
					Sanzang			
					Seimei Abe**			
					Shennong**			
					Shuten Dōji*			
					Sophitia Alexandra**			
					Sterkenburg Cranach**			
					Susanoo*			
					Tamamo**			
					Yinglong**			

== Plot ==
Several years after the events of Warriors Orochi 2, the warriors of the Three Kingdoms era of China and the Sengoku period of Japan have begun to rebuild their lives in the twisted dimensional world after Orochi's permanent death. The peace is not to last for long though, as a monstrous eight-headed serpent beast known as Hydra appears and massacres the warriors. Combined with the resurrection of Kiyomori Taira and the reappearance of Da Ji, who brainwashes the remaining heroes, the warriors are left in shambles. The remaining three heroes – Ma Chao, Sima Zhao, and Hanbei Takenaka – are about to be defeated if not for the intervention of the Moon Princess, Kaguya, who claims to have been sent from the mystic world to help the warriors. She uses her time travel ability to send the three back in time, so they will be able to save their comrades from certain doom.

After securing the more strategic places like Odawara Castle, the coalition are informed by mystic Taigong Wang that they can defeat the Hydra using a special weapon called "Yashio'ori", but they will need the time and power to build such a weapon. The coalition capture an amnesiac mighty warrior, Shuten Dōji, who is later revealed to be an offshoot of Orochi who was born at the same time as Hydra; in reality, he is the world's will of Orochi's power, as well as Da Ji herself, who reluctantly joins after the coalition have her friend, Himiko as an unwitting hostage. Because of the time required to build multiple Yashio'ori, the coalition have to return to the distant past when the Hydra had yet to appear in the world, which they fulfill through Da Ji's power, as she has been in the dimensional world the entire time (the other mystics have only appeared when the Hydra had made its appearance). Upon arriving, the coalition have to protect Da Ji from the anti-Orochi forces as well as an army of mystics led by Susanoo, who has dedicated his job to hunt Da Ji. They eventually gain their trust, and with the help of them, the coalition build multiple Yashio'ori powered by Shuten Dōji's essence, while also preparing for the upcoming grand battle with the Hydra.

In the final chapter, the coalition confront the Hydra again, who is defeated with the help of Yashio'ori. The Hydra then reforms to eight Orochi clones and later a final Orochi X form. While battling them, the coalition also have to gain the trust of Susanoo, who is not yet willing to let the problem fall into the mortal's hands. The game has three endings, which are unlocked through certain requirements. The "Normal" ending has the coalition finally being able to destroy Hydra. The "Good" ending is essentially the same, although the warriors then make pledge to rule the land together in peace. In the "True" ending, after Orochi X is defeated, the dimensional world begins to crumble, as Orochi's existence is the only thing that supports the world; defeating him means the end of the world. The mystics band their powers to send the warriors back to their own original time, saving them at the cost of their memories in the dimensional world.

The expanded story in the Ultimate update is continued from the "Good" ending of the original game, thus forgoing the "True" ending. Da Ji and the rest of the Demon Army have broken out from the coalition and are now traversing the dimensional world. They are attracted to a magical stone they found during their journey, which is revealed to be the sealed form of Mae Tamamo, a mystic who possesses a mysterious mirror, the Shinkyō, which has the ability to seal anyone who comes into contact with it and to create doppelgangers. Allying herself with Da Ji, Tamamo seals many warriors of the Three Kingdoms and Sengoku period and create doppelgangers of them, causing chaos and conflict within the Coalition. The mystics, who have gone to the mystic realm since the Hydra's defeat, descend once more to help the warriors. Depending on the progression, the player may finish the game's story in Chapter 6, which ends in the release of the sealed warriors and Tamamo's defeat and subsequent sealing as the stone again by the mystics. Otherwise, while the sealed warriors are released, Tamamo is not yet defeated, and the story continues to Chapter 7.

In an attempt to stop Tamamo from causing further conflicts, the warriors will need her own magic mirror, the Shinkyō to seal her. Through Kaguya's powers combined with Fu Xi's memories, the warriors travel far back in time in the mystic realm, when Orochi had not existed yet. The mystic realm is ruled by Tiandi, who is the original possessor of the Shinkyō and had used it to seal demons. The warriors meet with the mystic Yinglong, who is fooled by Tamamo into believing that the Emperor had used the Shinkyō to control the demons. He starts a rebellion against the Emperor and eventually manages to steal the mirror. This act causes him to be corrupted by the mirror's evil power, which transforms him into Orochi, who proceeds to go to the human realm to commit various evil acts after having killed the half-mystic Nezha. The Emperor, having learned of Tamamo's plans, gratefully lends the warriors the Shinkyō. Back in the present time, the warriors use the mirror against Tamamo, but this only makes her revert to her true form, the Kyūbi no Kitsune, who confronts the warriors in the final battle. The Ultimate update has two endings in addition to the three mentioned above, the first of which is the aforementioned "Normal" ending where Tamamo is sealed without having reverted to her true form. In this ending the warriors continue to live their life in peace in the dimensional world. The second ending is similar to the "True" ending of the original game, where, after having sealed Kyūbi, the mystics band their powers to send the warriors to their original timeline, but the dimensional world seems to stay intact, unlike the original game.

== Release ==
The game was originally released in Japan on December 22, 2011, in Europe on April 6, 2012, and in North America on March 20 (PlayStation 3), and March 27 (Xbox 360). Simultaneous store front meetings in Japan took place at the end of November until mid December for Dynasty Warriors Next and Musou Orochi 2. Attendees could obtain an original clear file for Musou Orochi 2 and play demos for both games at these meetings. Early buyers received a downloadable serial code granting Santa costumes to Mitsunari Ishida, Wang Yuanji, and Da Ji. The Treasure Box release includes a calendar which has characters represent the months and days individually, an original soundtrack, and an exclusive downloadable serial code for Ma Chao's weapon. Consumers who used Gamecity's shopping service had the option of obtaining a Three Kingdoms or Warring States themed hat.

=== Musou Orochi 2: Special ===
A PSP port, titled Musou Orochi 2: Special, was released on July 19, 2012, exclusively in Japan. Two additional characters were added: Rachel from the Ninja Gaiden series and a new character named Seimei Abe. A new Battle Royale Mode was included with support for up to four players. All characters, modes, and features from the original game were retained in this port. Ten PSP customizable themes based on characters are offered for players who pre-order the title. Players can automatically unlock all characters by inserting their saved data from Musou Orochi 2.

=== Warriors Orochi 3: Hyper ===
The Wii U port of the game, Warriors Orochi 3: Hyper (Musou Orochi 2: Hyper in Japan) was released in 2012 as one of the launch titles for the console. Unlike past releases, this port launched outside Japan first. Hyper features a new multiplayer mode called "Duel Mode" in which players battle enemies using three-man teams. Players have the option to play the game using a Wii U Pro Controller or the Wii U GamePad. The GamePad can be used to display an expanded mini-map. Local co-op includes an option that allows each player to have a full screen to play on, with one player using the TV screen while the other uses the GamePad's screen. The single player game can also be played on the GamePad's screen without the use of a TV. The game includes all characters from Special, including Rachel and Seimei Abe and adds two new characters: Momiji from the Ninja Gaiden series and a new original character, Shennong.

=== Warriors Orochi 3: Ultimate ===
An update to the original game, Musou Orochi 2: Ultimate was released for PlayStation 3 and PlayStation Vita on September 26, 2013. The PlayStation 4 version was released in Japan on June 26, 2014, featuring improved graphics and lighting among other enhancements. The game was released in North America and Europe in the same year on September 2 and 5, respectively with an additional Xbox One port, which was also released in Japan as a launch title. It was also released for the Nintendo Switch on November 9, 2017, to commemorate Omega Force's 20th anniversary. This is the first collaboration with Bandai Namco Entertainment.

The update includes all new features and characters from the Hyper version. It also features a new character, the game debut of Xu Shu, a Dynasty Warriors character who first appeared in Dynasty Warriors 7: Empires. New characters are also added, including Mae Tamamo, Yinglong, a younger incarnation of Nezha, Kyūbi no Kitsune, Hundun, Kasumi from the Dead or Alive series, Sterkenburg Cranach from the Atelier Arland series, and Sophitia Alexandra from the Soulcalibur series. The game expands on the original game's story by adding two new stories: "The Tale of the Latter Day", which takes place after the defeat of Hydra in the original game, and "The Tale of the Former Day", which is a side story that explains Orochi's origins as well as his secret with Da Ji. New stages are also added, including side stories to expand on the characters not prominently featured in the main story, alternative events on specific stages, and the chance to play stages through the enemy's perspective.

=== Warriors Orochi 3 Ultimate Definitive Edition ===
The upgraded version of Warriors Orochi 3 Ultimate, Warriors Orochi 3 Definitive Edition was released for PC via Steam in July 2022. This version contains Warriors Orochi 3: Ultimate, as well as most of the previously released downloadable content, highlighted by over 500 DLC items ranging from weapons and costumes to scenarios.

In addition, this version also includes new optimizations for the PC version, such as mouse and keyboard support and a wide range of graphical settings to allow players to fine tune their experience.

== Reception ==
Reception

Aggregate score
Aggregator	Score
Metacritic	PS3: 70/100; X360: 71/100; WIIU: 64/100; PS4: 77/100; Vita: 67/100; XONE: 73/100

Review scores
Publication	Score
Edge	7/10
Eurogamer	8/10
Famitsu	34/40; 35/40 (Ultimate)
IGN	8.5/10

Warriors Orochi 3 and its expanded versions received "mixed or average" reviews. The original version of Musou Orochi 2 sold 200,526 copies in its first three days of release. It was rated by Famitsu with a 9/8/8/9, for an averaged rating of 34/40.
