= Nakaoka Shintarō =

Samurai in Bakumatsu period Japan (1838-1867)

Nakaoka Shintarō 中岡 慎太郎
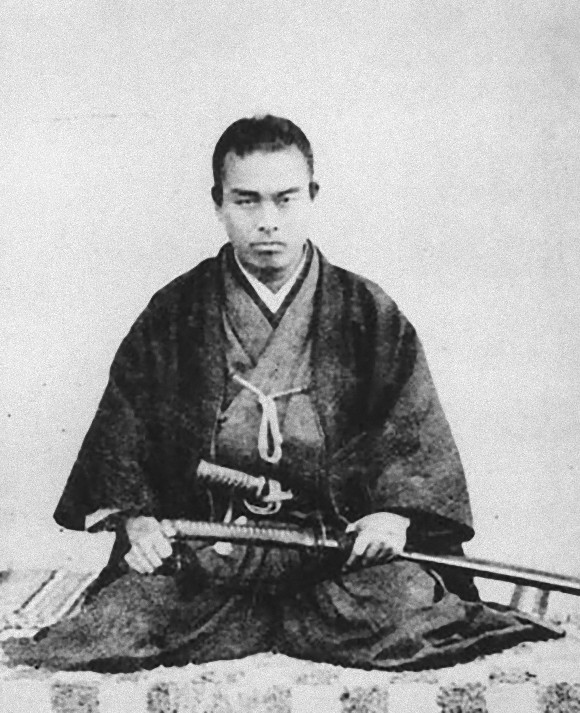
- Born: May 6, 1838; Kitagawa, Tosa Domain
- Died: December 12, 1867 (aged 29); Kyoto
- Cause of death: Assassination
- Occupation: Samurai

Japanese name
- Kanji: 中岡 慎太郎
- Hiragana: なかおか しんたろう
- Katakana: ナカオカ シンタロウ
Transcriptions
- Romanization: Nakaoka Shintarō

Nakaoka Shintarō (中岡 慎太郎; May 6, 1838 – December 12, 1867) was a samurai in Bakumatsu period Japan, and a close associate of Sakamoto Ryōma in the movement to overthrow the Tokugawa shogunate.

== Biography ==
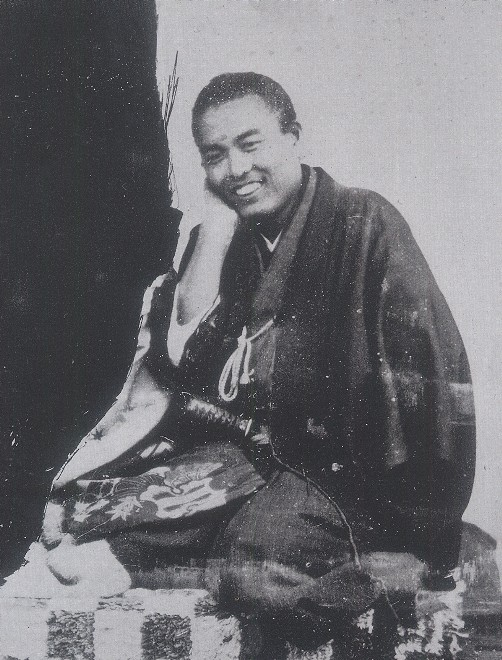
Nakaoka Shintarō on Nov 24, 1866

Nakaoka was born in Tosa Domain, in what is now the village of Kitagawa, Kōchi Prefecture, as the son of a village headman. In 1861, he enrolled in the academy run by Takechi Hanpeita where he studied swordsmanship. He was one of the founding members of the Tosa Kinno-tō, a paramilitary shishi organization created by Takeichi to support the sonnō jōi movement. After the coup d’etat of September 30, 1863, led to the suppression of the sonnō Jōi faction, he fled to Chōshū Domain together with pro-Sonnō Jōi nobles, including Sanjō Sanetomi. In 1864, he participated in a failed plot to assassinate Shimazu Hisamitsu, and fought alongside Chōshū forces during the Kinmon Incident and the Bombardment of Shimonoseki. Later that year, as a member of the Kaientai formed by Sakamoto Ryōma, he worked to bring about the Satsuma-Chōshū Alliance and obtain the backing and support of Sanjō Sanetomi for the project. In March, 1867, he travelled with Sakamoto Ryōma to their native Tosa Domain to negotiate a similar alliance between Tosa and Satsuma. In June, he began negotiations to further expand the new alliance to include Chōshū as well as Hiroshima Domain, but the issue was rendered moot when shōgun Tokugawa Yoshinobu formally returned governing power to the Emperor. Realizing that civil war was now increasingly probable, Nakaoka returned to Tosa and established the Rikuentai militia. Rikuentai was modeled after the Kiheitai in Chōshū in July.

On December 10, 1867, Nakaoka traveled to Kyoto for discussions with Sakamoto Ryōma, but was mortally wounded together with Sakamoto when unknown assailants attacked their lodgings (i.e. the "Ōmiya Incident"). Sakamoto died soon afterwards, but the critically injured Nakaoka lingered for two days, although never regaining enough consciousness to identify the attackers, though he did mention hearing Iyo dialect among the killers. His grave is located at the Ryosen Gokoku Jinja in Higashiyama-ku, Kyoto. He was posthumously awarded with the court rank of 4th grade in 1891 by Emperor Meiji.

There is a large bronze statue of Nakaoka Shintarō at Murotomisaki lighthouse in Cape Muroto in his native Kochi Prefecture, and another (together with Sakamoto Ryōma) at Maruyama Park in Kyoto.

== See also ==
- List of unsolved murders
