= Abura-akago =

Japanese yōkai

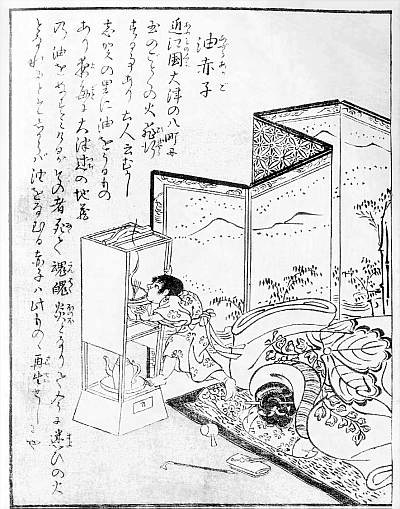
Abura-akago from the Konjaku Gazu Zoku Hyakki by Toriyama Sekien.

Abura-akago (油赤子; "oil baby") is a type of Japanese infant spirit or ghost. It is a yōkai that appeared illustrated in Toriyama Sekien's mid-Edo period Konjaku Gazu Zoku Hyakki, as an infant spirit lapping oil out of an andon lamp.

Sekien's accompanying notes describe it:

In Hatchō, Ōtsu in Ōmi ("Afumi") Province, there exists a flying ball-like fire. (近江国(あふみのくに)大津の八町に玉のごとくの火飛行(ひぎやう)する事あり。, Ōmi no kuni Ōtsu no Hatchō ni tama no gotoku no hi higyō suru koto ari.)
The natives say that long ago in the village of Shiga there was an oil merchant, and every night he stole the oil from the Jizō of the Ōtsu crossroads, but when this person died his soul became a flame and even now they grow accustomed to this errant fire. (土人云(いわく)、むかし志賀の里に油をうるものあり、夜毎(よごと)に大津辻(つじ)の地蔵の油をぬすみけるが、その者死て魂魄(こんぱく)炎(ほのほ)となりて今に迷(まよ)ひの火となれるとぞ。, Dojin iwaku, mukashi Shiga no sato ni abura wo uru mono ari, yogoto ni Ōtsu tsuji no Jizō no abura wo nusumikeru ga, sono mono shinite konpaku honō to narite ima ni mayoi no hi to nareru to zo.)
If it is so, then the baby who licks the oil is this person's rebirth. (しからば油をなむる赤子は此(この)ものの再生(さいせい)せしにや。, Shikaraba abura wo namuru akago wa kono mono no saisei seshi ni ya.)

The words after "long ago in the village of Shiga" were quoted from a story about a mysterious fire called the "abura-nusumi no hi" (the oil-stealing fire), which featured in the Edo period books, the Shokoku Rijin Dan (諸国里人談) and the Honchō Koji Innen Shū (本朝故事因縁集). In those books, it is stated that there was a folk belief where an oil merchant from Ōtsu, Ōmi Province steals oil from a Jizō statue at the crossroads so that he can sell them, and became lost and turned into a mysterious fire after death. In Mount Hiei, it is said that a mysterious fire called the abura-bō appears, and in the Shokoku Rijin Dan, this fire is seen to be the same as the "abura-nusumi no hi." It is inferred that Sekien's abura-akago was a made-up tale based on this "abura-nusumi no hi" in the Shokoku Rijin Dan and other books.

In more modern yōkai literature, it is interpreted that this yōkai takes on the appearance of a ball of flames and flies into people's houses, shapeshifts into that of a baby and licks the lanterns (andon lanterns), and returns to being a ball of fire and leaves. There's the theory that in the countryside in the past, unrefined materials like fish oil were used, so when cats licked the lamps, they might have looked like an abura-akago (baby licking an oil lamp).

Resembling this interpretation, in the book Tōhoku Kaidan no Tabi by the novelist Yamada Norio, a collection of kaidan, there was one Akita Prefecture kaidan titled "abura-name akago" (oil-licking baby) in which a baby-carrying woman in Akida stayed at the house of a shōya, and there the baby sucked completely dry all the oil of a lantern. Specialists have pointed out that Tōhoku Kaidan no Tabi includes many Sekien-created yōkai that have not originated from folklore, leading to the theory that this "abura-name akago" was also created based on Sekien's abura-akago. In Ihara Saikaku's early Edo period ukiyo book the Honchō Nijū Fukō (本朝二十不孝), an oil lantern-drinking baby also appears. Still, it has also been noted to be something made up.

Like the abura-nase and the ubagabi, there are many yōkai legends related to an attachment to oil. In this background, oil was a valuable resource used as food and as illumination in Japan, becoming even more of a necessity since the middle ages due to an improvement in refining technology, leading to the theory that these yōkai were born as a warning against wasting oil by licking and sucking it.

== Sources ==
- 水木しげる (2004) [1998]. 妖鬼化. Vol. 2. Softgarage. ISBN 978-4-86133-005-6.
- 村上健司編著 (2005). 日本妖怪大事典. Kwai books. 角川書店. ISBN 978-4-04-883926-6.
- 村上健司編著 (2000). 妖怪事典. 毎日新聞社. ISBN 978-4-620-31428-0.
- Mizuki, Shigeru (2003). Mujara 3: Kinki-hen. Japan: Soft Garage. p. 18. ISBN 978-4-86133-006-3.
- Toriyama, Sekien (July 2005). Toriyama Sekien Gazu Hyakki Yakō Zen Gashū (in Japanese). Tokyo: Kadokawa Shoten Publishing Co., Ltd. pp. 10–65. ISBN 978-4-04-405101-3.
- "Kaii Yōkai Denshō Database: Konpaku En". Archived from the original on 25 May 2007.
- http://www.obakemono.com/obake/aburaakago/ The Obakemono Project: Abura akago
