= Osakabehime =

Yōkai who inhabits a Himeji Castle and represented in Japanese culture

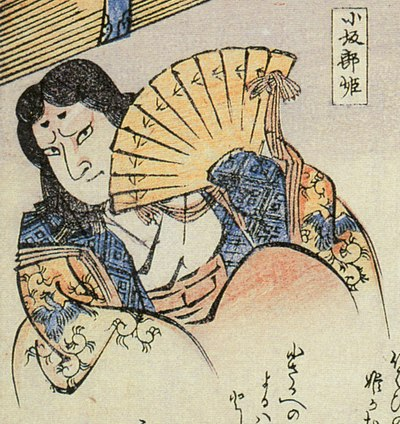
Osakabehime from the Kyōka Hyaku Monogatari

Osakabehime (刑部姫) is a figure in Japanese folklore. She is described as a yōkai inhabiting Himeji Castle. A Kabuki play based on her story is considered one of the Shin-Kabuki Jūhachiban.

== Legend ==
Osakabehime lives in the castle tower of Himeji Castle, and meets the castle lord only once a year to tell him the fate of the castle. According to Matsuura Shizuyama's essay Kasshi Yawa, the reason why Osakabehime lives in hiding like this is because she hates people.

The true identity of Osakabehime is generally considered to be an old kitsune, or an unrighteous child born by Princess Inoe to his son Osabe-shinno, There are also theories such as the claim she is the spirit of the courtesan that Emperor Fushimi loved or Osakabe Okami, the god of Mt Hime, where Himeji Castle is located. Gender of this yōkai was not clearly determined in Shokokuhyakumonogatari (appeared in various forms including men and women), but eventually they came to be considered a woman. It is believed that this was related Osakabe becoming Osakabehime (Princess Osakabe), "-hime" coming from Himeji.

In Mt Hime, where Himeji Castle was built, there were shrines such as a shrine to Osakabe Okami (刑部大神). There are various theories about who the deity of this shrine was, but it was thought that it was the god of the castle. This shrine and god are thought to be the origin of the name Osakabe. However, in early legends and creations such as Shokokuhyakumonogatari (諸国百物語, 1677), the yōkai was just called "Castle Monster" (城ばけ物). In order to expand the Himeji Castle, Toyotomi Hideyoshi removed the shrine and re-enshrined Osakabe in Harima Sōja, a shrine dedicated to several gods to the outskirts of the town when the castle was expanded.

Ikeda Terumasa, who became the owner of Himeji Castle after the Battle of Sekigahara, renovated the castle on a large scale, but when the new castle tower was completed in 1608, various mysteries occurred, and in 1611 Terumasa finally fell ill. Rumors circulated that this was a curse of the god Osakabe, so the Ikeda family built a shrine in the castle and relocated the god.

== Classic literature ==
In Toriyama Sekien's Konjaku Gazu Zoku Hyakki (今昔画図続百鬼), the yōkai is called "Osakabe" and is depicted as an old princess with a bat.

In Misaka Daiyata's Rōō Chabanashi (老媼茶話, Tea-time gossip of old ladies), from 1742, a young page named Morita Zusho went on a dare to go see if a yōkai really lived in the upper floors of Himeji Castle he saw a noble woman in her 30s wearing a twelve-layered ceremonial kimono. When she asked the page, why he came, and he replied that it was a test of the bravery, Osakabehime, who was impressed with his courage and candidness, gave him a shikorobuki (neck guard of a helmet) as a proof for the test.

In Ihara Saikaku's Nishizuru Kokubanashi (西鶴諸国ばなし), Osakabehime is described as extremely knowledgeable about many things and able to control a multitude (up to 800) of kenzokushin (animal-like spirits who act as messengers). She can read a person’s mind and manipulate them however she wants.

In Rōō Chabanashi, she is described as being of the same kind as the princess Kamehime of Inawashiro Castle in Mutsu Province, and in the kabuki play The Castle Tower (天守物語, Tenshu monogatari) by Kyōka Izumi, they are sister-in-laws.

== Popular culture ==
Osakabehime appears in Type-Moon's Fate franchise as an Assassin class Servant in their mobile game Fate/Grand Order.

Osakabehime appears as a boss fight in the video game Nioh 2, where she is portrayed as an ancient yokai which has possessed the castle tower of Himeji Castle, and which the game's protagonist must defeat late in the story.
