= Furutsubaki-no-rei =

Yōkai said to inhabit and develop from old camellia trees

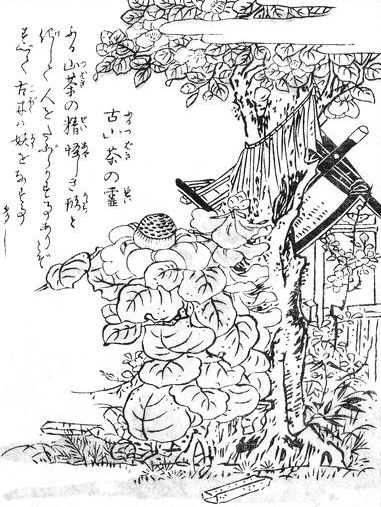
Furutsubaki-no-rei

The Furutsubaki-no-rei (Japanese: 古椿の霊, "old camellia spirit") is a yōkai said to inhabit and develop from old camellia trees.

== Overview ==
According to Toriyama Sekien's “Konjaku Gazu Zoku Hyakki”, a spirit dwells in an old camellia tree, turning into an apparition tree to fool people. Like many other folklore, these camellia monsters were widely known during the Kaidan culture era to the Bunsei era and remained in many folklore.

In modern times, the appearance and the behavior of falling camellia flowers reminisce the meaning of human death and because of that, the flowers are prohibited as a gift to inpatients during their visits. The origin of the yōkai folklore is theorized from the mysterious image the flowers holds.

=== Description ===
The appearance of the spirit that resides inside the camellia tree resembles a beautiful woman, encapsulating the beauty of the camellia flower. The trickery or bewitching is done by the spirit varies depending on the victim; most victims are enticed by the spirit's beauty or garner the victim's sympathy by replicating a sad and mournful cry. Commonly, the spirit scares their victims away when they get near the tree, while on some rare occasions the victims mysteriously disappear with the spirit. It is also believed that when the spirit cries at night, it can be heard as a warning, signaling that a tragedy would occur in the village or town in the future.

=== Appearance ===
It holds the appearance of a young, beautiful woman in a kimono. The real appearance of the Furutsubaki-no-rei is said to resemble a grotesque tree with red disfigured heads growing out of its trunk. The appearance signifies the behavior of the camellia flower because unlike other flowers, camellia flowers’ petals fall all at once. Red flowers falling from the branch is similar to a head falling off from a person's neck under the sword.

=== Origin ===
It is believed that the yōkai originated in a village located near the Kuju Plateau. There are several stories regarding how the Furutsubaki-no-rei was born. One story tells of a great tree that looked past over a village well hidden inside the forest. The tree grew beautiful flowers alongside those around it for many decades. One day, a young man found the tree and plucked one of its flowers, due to its magnificent beauty. Since then, women and men from the village sought out its flower, to use as ornaments and decoration. As more and more people took from the tree, the tree started to wither until one spring, it was left to wither away. After the constant abuse, the tree felt rage and with its new emotion started to grow more beautiful flowers. Again, another villager sought out the beautiful flower from the tree and was found lifeless near the flowerbed around the tree after a few days. The death was a mystery until a couple from a different village visited the tree for its flower, although only the woman came back screaming and yelling at the villagers that her lover was taken by a ghost. Since then, any individual who ventured out into the forest who dared to take the tree's flower and survived would say that a beautiful woman would be near the tree.

=== Folklore ===
==== Akita Prefecture Folklore ====
The mystery of Kanmanji Temple in Kisakata, Nikaho City. When a person was walking near the temple at midnight, the person heard a sad voice coming from the camellia tree. A few days later, misery befell the temple. Since then similarly strange occurrences continued, the camellia announced warnings of misfortune to the temple at night, and was called “Night Crying Camellia”. This camellia tree still exists as it is 700 years old, and is recognized as one of the seven mysteries of the temple.

==== Gifu Prefecture Folklore ====
It was in Aohaka Village, Fuwa District Gifu Prefecture currently named Ogaki City. An excavator died from a curse when excavating the burial mound in the village, discovering some old mirrors and bone. After that, neighbors restored the burial mound and planted a camellia tree on top of it. Since then, when passing the burial mound at night, the camellia tree takes the form of a beautiful woman and shines by the roadside. Afterwards, the camellia came to be called a Masquerade Camellia.

Yōkai of Higo Province (currently Kumamoto Prefecture) "Kishinbo"

A yōkai folktale handed down in Higo Province. It is said that when a wooden pestle is made from a camellia tree; it causes the tree to be reborn.

==== Yamagata Prefecture's ghost story "Tsubakijo" ====
During the Tenmei era, two merchants were walking on the passage of Yamagata castle. When they passed a tsubaki tree along a road, a beautiful young woman appeared out of nowhere on the road beside one of the merchants and was walking with them. When the woman breathed on the merchant, the merchant transformed into a bee. The woman on the side street disappeared into the wicked camellia tree, and the merchant who turned into a bee followed her into the wicked tree and was sucked into the camellia flower. Eventually, the flower fell off from the tree. When the other merchant picked up the fallen flower, the bee inside the flower seemed to have already died. The merchant then picked up the flower and headed to a temple, and explained the situation to the Osho. The Osho stated that there have been rumors in the past where people have disappeared on the main road and believed that it must have been the doings of the same woman. Osho tried to revive the merchant that turned into the bee by chanting sutras, but that did not return him to life or its original human form. So he buried the bee and the flower.

== Footnote ==
1. "Furutsubaki no rei – Yokai.com". yokai.com.
2. Murakami, Kenji; 村上健司 (2000). Yōkai jiten. Tōkyō: Mainichi Shinbunsha. p. 300. ISBN 4-620-31428-5. OCLC 45026652.
3. Yamaguchi, Bintarō (2015). Daihakuryoku! Nihon no yōkai daihyakka. Tōkyō. ISBN 978-4-7916-2120-0. OCLC 934882872.
4. Yamaguchi, Bintarō (2015). Daihakuryoku! Nihon no yōkai daihyakka. Tōkyō. ISBN 978-4-7916-2120-0. OCLC 934882872.
5. Yamaguchi, Bintarō; 山口敏太郎 (2003). Tōhoku yōkai zukan. Akita-shi: Mumyōsha Shuppan. ISBN 4-89544-344-2. OCLC 168093031.
6. Yamaguchi, Bintarō; 山口敏太郎 (2003). Tōhoku yōkai zukan. Akita-shi: Mumyōsha Shuppan. ISBN 4-89544-344-2. OCLC 168093031.
7. Murakami, Kenji; 村上健司 (2000). Yōkai jiten. Tōkyō: Mainichi Shinbunsha. ISBN 4-620-31428-5. OCLC 45026652.
8. Murakami, Kenji; 村上健司 (2000). Yōkai jiten. Tōkyō: Mainichi Shinbunsha. ISBN 4-620-31428-5. OCLC 45026652.
9. 山田, 野理夫 (1974). 東北怪談の旅 (in Japanese). 自由国民社.

== Related item ==
List of Japanese youkai
