= Hone-onna =

Yōkai

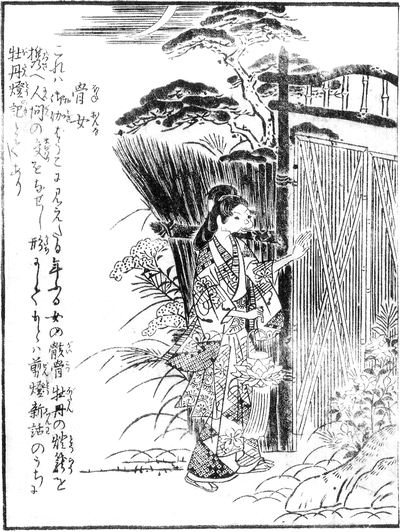
"Honeonna" (骨女) from the Konjaku Gazu Zoku Hyakki by Sekien Toriyama

Hone-onna (骨(ほね)女(おんな); literally: bone woman) is a yōkai depicted in the Konjaku Gazu Zoku Hyakki (1779) by Toriyama Sekien. As its name implies, it depicts this yōkai as a woman in the form of bones.

In Sekien's explanatory text in the Konjaku Gazu Zoku Hyakki states that there is a story called Otogi Bōko (御伽ばうこ) in which an aged female skeleton would carry a chōchin (lantern) decorated with botan flowers on it and visit the house of a man she loved back when she was still alive, and then cavort with that man. In other words, this refers to "Botan Dōrō" (牡丹燈籠; "The Peony Lantern"), within the collection of writings called Otogi Bōko (伽婢子; 1666) by Asai Ryōi. (The collection was composed as a sort of moral-free version of the Chinese work Jiandeng Xinhua written in 1378 by Qu You.) In the Botan Dōrō, a man named Ogiwara Shinnojō meets a beautiful woman named Yako and they become entangled almost every night, but one night an old person from next door catches a glimpse of it and sees the strange scene of Shinnojō embracing with a skeleton.

According to Tōhoku Kaidan no Tabi by Norio Yamada, there is an odd tale in the Aomori Prefecture about a yōkai under the title of "hone-onna". It says that in the Ansei period, a woman who was said to be ugly by those around her became a good-looking skeleton after death, and walked around town as a skeleton to let everyone see. It is said that she likes fish bones and would collapse upon encountering a high priest.

== See also ==
- Obake
- Succubus
- La Calavera Catrina
