= Buer (demon) =

Spirit from the Pseudomonarchia Daemonum

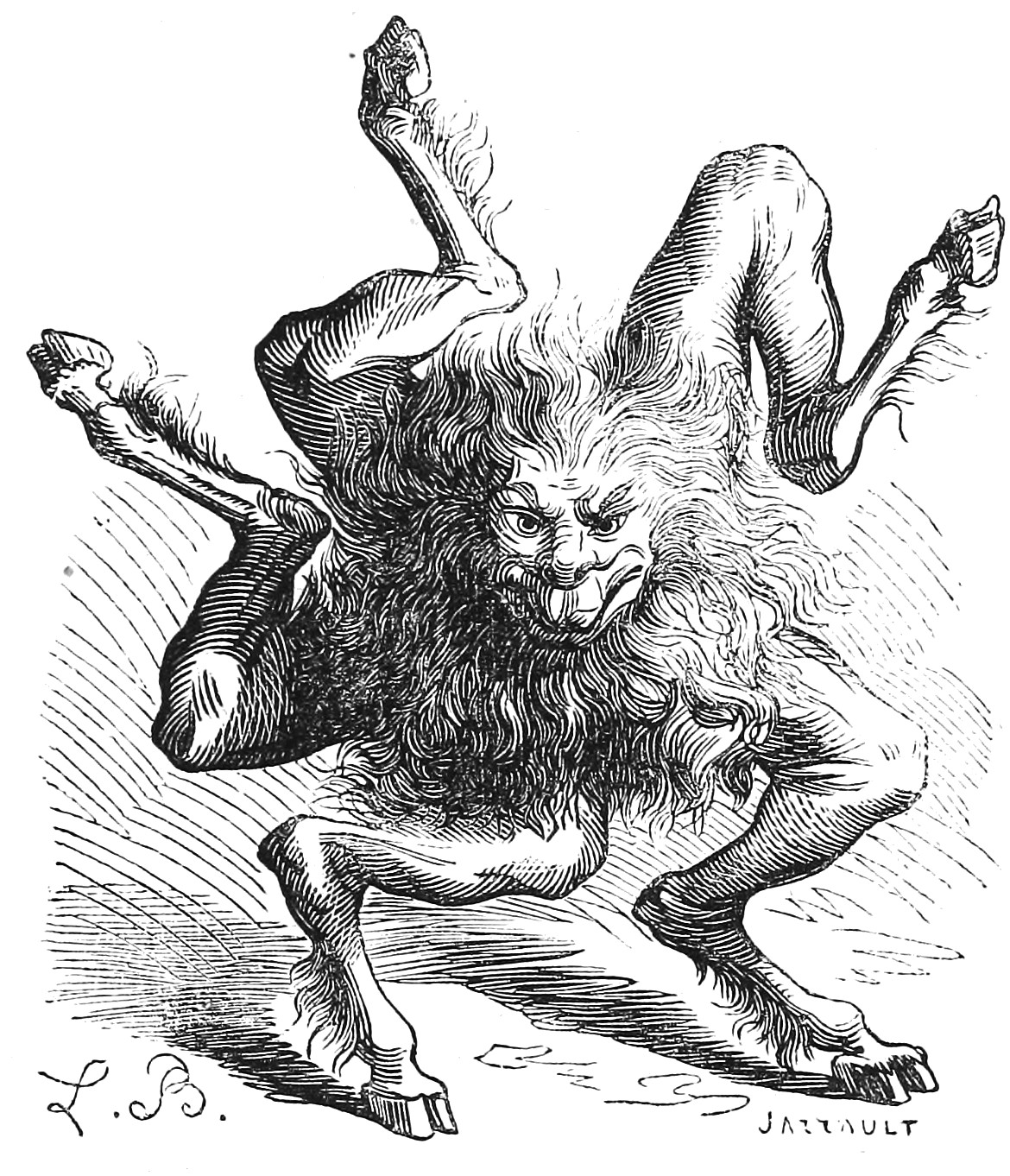
Buer, the 10th spirit, who teaches "Moral and Natural Philosophy". Illustration by Louis Breton from Dictionnaire Infernal

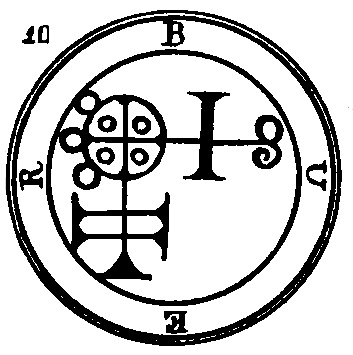
The sigil of Buer

Buer is a spirit that appears in the 16th-century grimoire Pseudomonarchia Daemonum and its derivatives, where he is described as a Great President of Hell, having fifty legions of demons under his command. Like Chiron, the chief centaur of Greek mythology, he teaches natural and moral philosophy, logic, and the qualities and uses of all herbs and plants, and is also capable of healing all infirmities (especially of men) and bestows good familiars.

He has been described as being a wheel with several legs, or even as a lion head with multiple goat legs. Additionally, Louis Le Breton created an illustration of Buer, later engraved by M. Jarrault, depicting the demon as having the head of a lion and five, six or more goat or horse legs surrounding his body to where he can move in any direction. In The Lesser Key of Solomon, Buer is said to appear in Sagittarius when the Sun is there. The Sun moves into Sagittarius in common astrological order during November 22nd to December 21st

When the Sun comes into Sagittarius, some dates vary in other astrological systems and may vary yearly as well:

“The 10th Spirit is Buer, a Great President. He appeareth in Sagittary, and that is his shape when the Sun is there. He teaches Philosophy, both Moral and Natural, and the Logic Art, and also the Virtues of all Herbs and Plants. He healeth all distempers in man, and giveth good Familiars. He governeth 50 Legions of Spirits, and his Character of obedience is this, which thou must wear when thou callest him forth unto appearance.” -Lesser Key of Solomon, published by Aleister Crowley in 1904

== See also ==
- Ixion, from Greek mythology, the father of the centaurs who is bound to a winged fiery wheel by Zeus
- The Lesser Key of Solomon
- Wanyūdō, a similar creature from Japanese mythology

== Sources ==
- S. L. MacGregor Mathers, A. Crowley, The Goetia: The Lesser Key of Solomon the King (1904). 1995 reprint: ISBN 0-87728-847-X.
