= Sansei (folklore) =

Chinese legendary creature

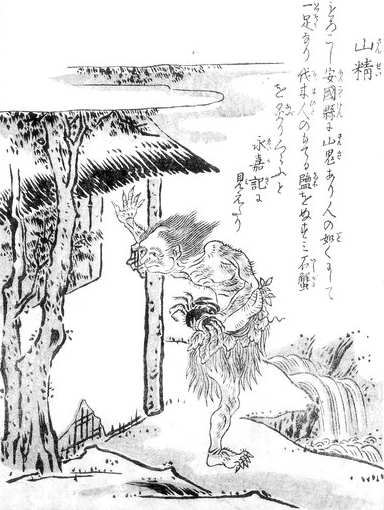
"Sansei" from the Konjaku Gazu Zoku Hyakki by Toriyama Sekien.

Sansei (山精) is a type of yōkai (spirit or monster) from the legends of Hebei Province, China. It is also known as Sanki (山鬼).

The Japanese Edo period encyclopedia, Wakan Sansai Zue, provides a description of the Sansei based on citations from various Chinese texts. According to these sources:

- It resides near Anguo (安国県), China.
- Its height is described as one shaku (approx. 30 cm or 1 ft) according to the Eika Ki, or three to four shaku (approx. 90–120 cm or 3–4 ft) according to the Genchū Ki (玄中記).
- It possesses only one leg, and its heel is attached facing backward (a feature mentioned in the Baopuzi; see image).
- It steals salt from people working in the mountains and frequently eats crabs and frogs.
- It appears at night and assaults humans. However, if one calls out the name 'Batsu' (魃, a Chinese drought spirit), the Sansei loses its power to harm them.
- Conversely, if a human attacks a Sansei, that person may fall ill, or their house might catch fire.

The Wakan Sansai Zue also gives the Japanese kun'yomi reading kata-ashi no yama-oni (片足のやまおに, "one-legged mountain oni") for the characters 山精.

== Sansei in Japan ==
The Japanese artist Toriyama Sekien included the Sansei in his yōkai collection Konjaku Gazu Zoku Hyakki (Illustrated Supplement to the Hundred Demons of the Past and Present), depicting it holding a crab and peering into a mountain hut. The accompanying explanatory text quotes the description found in the Wakan Sansai Zue, noting features such as its origin in Anguo County (referred to by the old Japanese term for China, Morokoshi), its alternative name 'Sanki', its habit of stealing salt, and its diet of crabs.

Due to its inclusion in Sekien's influential work, some later Japanese yōkai literature, particularly from the Shōwa and Heisei eras onwards, have presented the Sansei as if it were a native Japanese yōkai, rather than one originating in China. Some of these derivative descriptions mention it appearing at mountain huts specifically because it wants salt, while others claim it holds dominion over the animals of the mountains.

== See also ==
- List of legendary creatures from China
- shanxiao (山𤢖) - a Chinese mountain spirit that shares several characteristics with the Sansei
- Dokkakgwi - a one-Legged demon
