= Warriors Orochi 2 =

2008 video game

- Warriors Orochi 2 North American box art
- Developer: Omega Force
- Publisher: Koei
- Designer: Atsushi Ichiyanagi
- Series: Dynasty Warriors; Samurai Warriors; Warriors Orochi
- Platforms: PlayStation 2 Xbox 360; PlayStation Portable
- Release: PlayStation 2: JP: April 3, 2008; EU: September 19, 2008; NA: September 23, 2008; Xbox 360: JP: September 4, 2008; EU: September 19, 2008; NA: September 23, 2008; AU: October 16, 2008; PlayStation Portable: JP: November 27, 2008; NA: August 28, 2009; AU: September 3, 2009; EU: September 4, 2009
- Genre: Hack and slash
- Modes: Single-player, multiplayer

Warriors Orochi 2, known in Japan as Musō Orochi: Rebirth of the Demon Lord (無双OROCHI 魔王再臨, Musō Orochi: Maō Sairin; lit. Unmatched Orochi: Rebirth of the Demon Lord), is a 2008 video game developed by Koei and Omega Force for the PlayStation 2. It is the sequel to Warriors Orochi, a crossover video game of the Dynasty Warriors and Samurai Warriors series. The game was released in September for North America and Europe. A version for the Xbox 360 was released on September 4 in Japan. A PlayStation Portable version has been released in Japan, North America and Europe.

== Plot ==
The game starts with the defeat of Orochi at the end of the first game, the new land consisting of the warriors from the Three Kingdoms Era of China and the Warring States period of Japan found peace. It was, however, not destined to last. Former officers under the Orochi army broke away and formed their own armies, while others not affiliated with Orochi began to create armies of their own as well. All the while, an evil plot is in motion behind the scenes, to revive the greatest evil the world has ever known: Orochi himself.

This story is a prequel of the first game, showing how Da Ji frees Orochi from the mystic world and him twisting the Three Kingdoms era of China and the Warring States period of Japan to form a new dimensional world. Joined by Dong Zhuo, they begin their quest to defeat all warriors and make them their slaves. Meanwhile, a group of mystics led by Taigong Wang, Fu Xi, and Nu Wa, try to stop Orochi and imprison him again. Later, Sakon Shima is on his way to visit Shingen Takeda when he sees the Yellow Turbans (led by Zhang Jiao) being attacked by Dong Zhuo. Realizing the threat caused by the hunger of warlords, he begins forming his forces by inviting the three daimyōs Shingen Takeda, Nobunaga Oda, and Kenshin Uesugi. He also meets a mystic named Fu Xi, who tells him that the Orochi Army is planning something. In the meantime, Liu Bei is concerned with the growing threat of his enemies fighting for power over the dimensional world after Orochi's defeat. He soon forms an alliance with several allies, such as Ieyasu Tokugawa, Yoshimoto Imagawa, and Sun Shang Xiang to defend Shu from collapsing. They are soon joined by a mysterious mystic named Taigong Wang. Trying to capture Da Ji (who has escaped after Orochi's death), he asks Shu for their assistance. Cao Cao begins reforming his forces when he sees that the Orochi Army has started to grow in strength despite Orochi's death. He is joined by a mystic named Nu Wa who, despite her assistance to help Cao Cao, refuses to answer questions regarding anything related to Da Ji or the monkey king Sun Wukong, who recently leads an army of "circus". Regardless, both try to uncover the secrets behind Da Ji and Sun Wukong, who seem to be working for the same goal. Meanwhile, Wu has lived in peace following Orochi's death. The leader of the kingdom, Sun Jian does not build an army despite the other warlords such as Cao Cao forming their own. He does however send several of his men as spies in anticipation of their attacks. One of his sent officers, Ranmaru Mori reports the sighting of a man named Yoshitsune Minamoto battling Lu Bu. After rescuing him, he requests Wu's help to find his nemesis Kiyomori Taira, who actually has a secret plan in progress.

== Characters ==
The first Warriors Orochi boasts a roster of 79 playable characters spanning both the Dynasty Warriors and Samurai Warriors series. This game introduces a total of 13 new characters, including characters new to the Warriors franchise. Along with all the characters from the first game returning, 92 characters encompass the roster of Warriors Orochi 2.

Several existing characters from the Warriors games that did not appear in Warriors Orochi make their debut in the sequel. For the first time since Dynasty Warriors 3, Fu Xi and Nu Wa are playable, complete with updated character models. Additionally, because this game is released after Samurai Warriors 2: Xtreme Legends, Yoshimoto Imagawa's updated character model, Kojiro Sasaki, Katsuie Shibata, Toshiie Maeda, Motochika Chōsokabe and Gracia are included.

In addition, there are other characters, new to the Warriors franchise, that appear as well:

- Taigong Wang (太公望, Taikō Bō), also known as Jiang Ziya, was a legendary military strategist and the most famous Prime Minister from the Zhou dynasty of China. He is the one who can easily outmatch Da Ji's strategic thinking and ordered her execution personally in their own world. He has a rather cocky and egotistic personality. He uses a fishing rod as a weapon.
- Kiyomori Taira (平清盛, Taira no Kiyomori) was a military general from the Heian Period of Japan. He is allied with Orochi and is part of his resurrection. He uses a set of gigantic prayer beads as a weapon.
- Yoshitsune Minamoto (源義経, Minamoto no Yoshitsune) was another military general from the Heian Period, opposing Kiyomori. He can fight Lu Bu in an even match and even unscathed, which surprised Wu. He wields a lightsaber-like gauntlet that is attached to his arm and can fire energy projectiles with it. He is a rather typical samurai.
- Sun Wukong (孫悟空, Son Gokū), also known as The "Monkey King", is the main character from Journey to the West, one of the Four Great Classical Novels of Chinese literature (which includes Romance of the Three Kingdoms). As in every incarnation of him, he utilizes his famous Jingu Staff as his weapon. In order to be released from confinement by Kiyomori, Sun Wukong fights for the Orochi army.
- Himiko (卑弥呼) was the ancient Japanese shaman queen known for her relationship with the Kingdom of Wei of China. She utilizes a set of energy-firing Dogu dolls. She has a sister-like relationship with Da Ji and both are protective of each other.
- Orochi X (真・遠呂智, Shin Orochi) is the revived form of Orochi. Having been revived by Kiyomori Taira and Da Ji, this new form of Orochi is more powerful and evil than before. He utilizes his same scythe as his first form, but has a more powerful moveset.

There are also two characters, Dodomeki and Gyuki, that are playable only in Survival and VS modes only. They are modeled after two new classes of Orochi generic generals. Dodomeki is a speed-type character that shares a similar moveset to Kotaro Fuma, while Gyuki is a power-type character that possess a unique moveset.

* Denotes new characters to the series.

** Denotes new characters added through ports.

Bold denotes default characters.

| Shu | Wei | Wu | Other 1 | Other 2 | Samurai 1 | Samurai 2 | Samurai 3 |
|---|---|---|---|---|---|---|---|
| **Guan Ping** | **Cao Cao** | Da Qiao | Diao Chan | **Da Ji** | Goemon Ishikawa | **Hanzō Hattori** | **Ginchiyo Tachibana** |
| **Guan Yu** | Cao Pi | Gan Ning | **Dong Zhuo** | Dodomeki* | Kenshin Uesugi | Hideyoshi Toyotomi | Gracia* |
| **Huang Zhong** | Cao Ren | **Huang Gai** | Lu Bu | Fu Xi* | Keiji Maeda | **Ieyasu Tokugawa** | Kanetsugu Naoe |
| Jiang Wei | **Dian Wei** | **Ling Tong** | Meng Huo | Gyuki* | **Kunoichi** | **Ina** | Katsuie Shibata* |
| **Liu Bei** | Pang De | Lu Meng | Yuan Shao | Himiko* | Magoichi Saika | Masamune Date | Kojirō Sasaki* |
| Ma Chao | Sima Yi | Lu Xun | Zhang Jiao | Kiyomori Taira* | Mitsuhide Akechi | Mitsunari Ishida | Kotarō Fūma |
| Pang Tong | Xiahou Dun | Sun Ce | Zhu Rong | **Nu Wa*** | Nobunaga Oda | Nagamasa Azai | **Motochika Chōsokabe*** |
| Wei Yan | Xiahou Yuan | **Sun Jian** | Zuo Ci | **Orochi** | Oichi | Nō | **Musashi Miyamoto** |
| **Xing Cai** | **Xu Huang** | **Sun Quan** | | Orochi X* | **Okuni** | **Ranmaru Mori** | Nene |
| Yue Ying | Xu Zhu | **Sun Shang Xiang** | | Sun Wukong* | Shingen Takeda | **Sakon Shima** | Toshiie Maeda* |
| **Zhang Fei** | **Zhang He** | Taishi Ci | | Taigong Wang* | Yukimura Sanada | **Tadakatsu Honda** | **Yoshihiro Shimazu** |
| Zhao Yun | Zhang Liao | Xiao Qiao | | Yoshitsune Minamoto* | | **Yoshimoto Imagawa** | |
| Zhuge Liang | Zhen Ji | **Zhou Tai** | | | | | |
| | | Zhou Yu | | | | | |

== Gameplay ==
In addition to the Story, Free and Gallery Modes from the first game, there are other new modes of gameplay:

- New Weapon Upgrades and Fusions is a feature introduced in the first Warriors Orochi. Upgrading and modifying weapons has been given a new twist by fulfilling the requirement for a much better skill imbued on a weapon.
- Treasure Hunt Side Quest: In addition to normal game objectives and missions on each map, hidden Treasures are placed on each map. Each map has different hidden Treasures.
- Versus Mode: A feature from Dynasty Warriors 4 and the original Samurai Warriors, Versus Mode pits two players against each other in four separate modes. Players can select teams of three characters different from each other. This mode pits two players against each other in a traditional fighting game (which the very first Dynasty Warriors is). Tag Team gives each player three characters as a team, while Elimination gives players one character each.
- Tower: The objective of this game mode is to knock out more enemies than the opponent.
- Steeple Chase resembles a traditional arcade style racing game. Two players ride horses and race to the finish line. Items are available in-game to give players added abilities.
- Survival Mode follows the same concepts of Tag Team. The difference is that the number of computer opponents is infinite.
- In the all-new Dream Mode, players can select three of the available 92 characters in this game and play through a special scenario tailored to the chosen team. None of the characters that appear outside the Three Kingdoms and Sengoku periods are part of any teams. There are 28 stages total.

Twenty new stages are included in the sequel. Most of the stages were brought over from Dynasty Warriors 5: Xtreme Legends and Samurai Warriors 2 Xtreme Legends. Most, if not all, stages from the first Warriors Orochi return in the stories, while others are used in Dream Mode stages.

Unlike the first game's character palette swaps, Warriors Orochi 2 features different costumes for each character. Each character has three costumes; the same 2 palette swap costumes as in the first game return, and a different costume that is either their Dynasty Warriors 4 costume or their Samurai Warriors costume (with the exceptions of Oichi and Masamune Date). Characters that debuted after Dynasty Warriors 4 or the original Samurai Warriors have new alternate costumes entirely. To unlock these 3rd costumes, the characters must have their proficiency at level 10.

To promote Dynasty Warriors: Strikeforce, the Japanese PSP version of Warriors Orochi 2 features the Musou Awakening forms of Zhao Yun, Xiahou Dun and Sun Shang Xiang as usable costumes, unlocked by completing the story modes.

The North American, European and Taiwan releases have additional features exclusively in the PSP version of the game. These features include the addition of Japanese voices, an installation to the Memory Stick Duo to decrease load times, and additional characters, such as Benkei and San Zang, and contents from the unreleased Musou Orochi Z, a game that was not released outside Japan.

== Reception ==
Reception

Aggregate scores
| Aggregator | Score |
|---|---|
| GameRankings | (PSP) 58.75% (PS2) 54.17% (X360) 44.64% |
| Metacritic | (PSP) 56/100 (PS2) 52/100 (X360) 44/100 |

Review scores
| Publication | Score |
|---|---|
| Destructoid | (PSP) 6.5/10 (X360) 2/10 |
| Famitsu | 34/40 |
| GameRevolution | C− |
| GameSpot | 4/10 |
| GameZone | (PSP) 7/10 (PS2) 5.5/10 (X360) 4.8/10 |
| IGN | (PSP) 5.2/10 (PS2) 4.5/10 (X360) 4/10 |
| Official Xbox Magazine (US) | 5.5/10 |
| PALGN | 4.5/10 |
| PlayStation: The Official Magazine | 3/5 |
| TeamXbox | 5.8/10 |

Warriors Orochi 2 was met with mixed to negative reception. GameRankings and Metacritic gave it a score of 58.75% and 56 out of 100 for the PSP version; 54.17% and 52 out of 100 for the PlayStation 2 version; and 44.64% and 44 out of 100 for the Xbox 360 version.

As of July 2008, the game has sold 946,131 copies in Japan, according to Famitsu, which also gave the Xbox 360 version a score of 8, 9, 8, and 9, up to a total of 34 out of 40.
