= Aonyōbō =

Yōkai in Japanese mythology

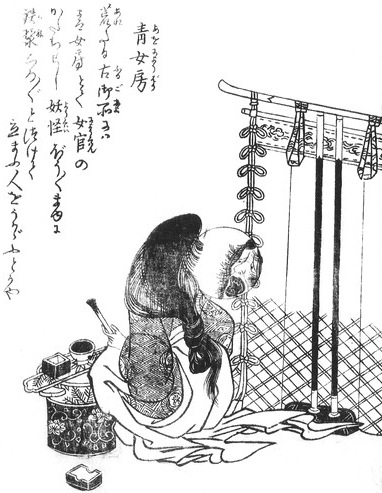
Aonyōbō as seen in Konjaku Gazu Zoku Hyakki.

Aonyōbō (青女房) (also called Ao-nyōbō and Ao nyōbō) is a Yōkai in Japanese mythology.

== Mythology ==
The Aonyōbō is a blue-skinned ogre-like spirit of poverty and misfortune who takes the appearance of an ancient court noblewoman. Covered in many kimono of older eras, that are now tattered and moth-ridden, she wears the white face of ancient courtiers who have high-painted eyebrows and black teeth.

Legend has it that they are court ladies who serve noble families until they are married off to a worthy suitor.

The Aonyōbō inhabit abandoned houses, formerly occupied by fallen nobles and ruined families, where they are constantly applying their makeup, fixing their hair, and adjusting their image for the arrival of possible guests who never show up like a lover who lost their interest or a husband who abandoned his wife. If any trespassers arrive, the Aonyōbō will devour them and vainly wait until the next person shows up.

== Popular culture ==
- In Shuriken Sentai Ninninger, the villain Ariake no Kata is based on the Aonyōbō.
- In Power Rangers Ninja Steel, she is adapted as "Badonna."
