= Wanyūdō =

Japanese mythical monster

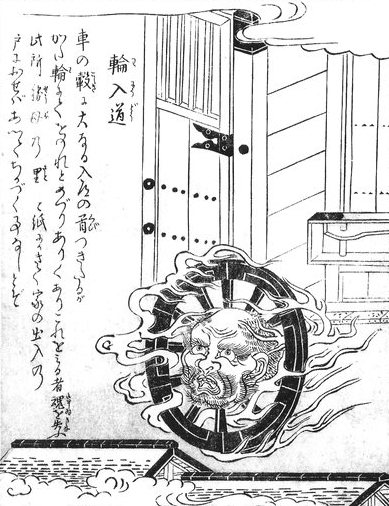
Artist's depiction of Wanyūdō from Konjaku Gazu Zoku Hyakki, circa 1779

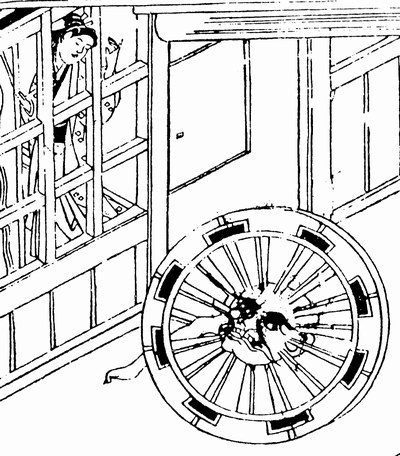
"The matter of the Katawaguruma of Higashinotoin, Kyoto" from the anonymous Shokoku Hyakumonogatari.

Wanyūdō (Japanese: 輪入道, literally "wheel (輪) monk (入道)"), also known as "Firewheel" or "Soultaker", is a yōkai depicted in Toriyama Sekien's collection of yōkai illustrations, Konjaku Gazu Zoku Hyakki. He is a relatively well-known yōkai; the earliest reports of him date back to the Heian period.

== Description ==
In Konjaku Gazu Zoku Hyakki, Toriyama Sekien depicts Wanyūdō as a figure with a male face attached to the center of an ox cart wheel wrapped in flames. The accompanying explanatory text states the following:

A wheel hub has a large priest's head attached to it, which turns and moves around on its own. Those who see this lose their souls. If you write "This place is the village of Shōbo" on a piece of paper and stamp it on the door of your house, it will not dare to approach.

Wanyūdō steals the souls of those who see its form. The instruction to paste a paper reading "This place is the village of Shōbo" (Japanese: 此所勝母の里) on the door of a house as a charm means that Wanyūdō cannot approach. The phrase "This place is the village of Shōbo" is derived from an anecdote in the "Biographies of Zou Yang" from the Records of the Grand Historian (Shiji). In the story, Zengzi, a disciple of Confucius and the founder of a school of Confucianism in China, refused to set foot in the village of "Shōbo" (Chinese: Shengmu; literally "Defeating Mother" or "Winning over Mother") because he disliked the name, which implied overcoming one's mother.

Various folklore also purports him as the condemned soul of a tyrannical daimyō who, in life, was known for having his victims drawn on the back of an ox cart. He is said to guard the gates of Hell, and to wander back and forth along the road between this world and the underworld, scaring townsfolk as he passes and stealing the souls of anyone who gets too close in order to bring them to Hell with him.

== Identity with Katawaguruma ==
Sekien's Wanyūdō is considered to be drawn based on the "Katawaguruma" (Wheel) yōkai (Volume 1, "The Matter of the Katawaguruma of Higashinotoin, Kyoto") recorded in Shokoku Hyakumonogatari (One Hundred Tales from Various Provinces) published in 1677 (Enpō 5), due to its shape and content. Although "Katawaguruma" and "Wanyūdō" are depicted as separate yōkai in Konjaku Gazu Zoku Hyakki, they are thought to be separate works created using the same legend as material.

The illustration in Shokoku Hyakumonogatari depicts a Katawaguruma in the form of a face attached to the center of a wheel. Wanyūdō is depicted as male and Katawaguruma as female, and they are interpreted as such today; however, the depiction of Katawaguruma as a female began with the Shokoku Rijindan (Tales of Country Folk from Various Provinces) published in 1743 (Kanpō 3). Differences in depiction (whether a human face is attached to the wheel or a woman is riding the wheel) already existed in illustrations in printed books prior to Sekien. It is believed that "Katawaguruma," which was originally exactly the same legend, may have branched into two yōkai: Katawaguruma and Wanyūdō.

== Legends ==
One of the most famous legends comes from Kyoto, Japan. As Wanyūdō rolled through the town, a woman peeked out her window at him. Wanyūdō told her "Instead of looking at me, have a look at your own child!"

She looked down at her baby to find him lying on the floor in a pool of blood with his legs missing.

When she looked back outside at the demon, she saw her baby's legs in his mouth as he ate them.

== Behavior ==
When this Yōkai is seen, most people avoid it and lock all doors and windows and pray in hopes that it will go away, because this Yōkai gets great joy from dragging people to hell with its wheel to be judged. When this Yōkai returns to earth, it works a lot to pay off the sins of its past.

== Modern appearances ==
=== Video games ===
- Actraiser - hybrid game for the Super Nintendo
- Demon Blade – Japanese Samurai RPG
- Kenseiden – action RPG for Master System
- Megami Tensei – series of role-playing games
- Nioh – action RPG
- Ōkami – action-adventure game for PlayStation 2 (2006)
- Yo-Kai Watch - monster collector RPG for Nintendo 3ds; inspiration behind "Duwheel" (boss)
- Yomawari – survival horror game for PlayStation
- Age of Mythology: Retold – real-time strategy game for PC

=== Television and film ===
- Doron Dororon - manga
- Gantz: O – CGI anime movie
- Gegege no Kitaro – anime series (2018)
- Hell Girl – manga, anime, video game
- Kamen Rider – manga and anime series
- One Piece – manga and anime series
- Toriko - manga; inspiration behind Mythical Beast "Soylent Mean"

== See also ==
- List of legendary creatures from Japan
- Katawaguruma
- Kasha (Fire cart)
- Buer (demon), a similar creature from Christian mythology
- Ixion
- Japanese mythology
