= Dokkakgwi =

East Asian legendary creature

Dujiaogui (Chinese: 独脚鬼; pinyin: Dújiǎoguǐ) or dokkakgwi (Korean: 독각귀; Hanja: 獨脚鬼), meaning "one-legged ghost", is a name used for one-legged spirits in Chinese and Korean folklore. In Korea, dokkakgwi is also a name for the dokkaebi. Some Korean stories describe the dokkaebi as having one leg, but it can take other forms.

== Origins ==
One-legged beings appear in old Chinese stories. The Classic of Mountains and Seas (Shanhaijing) describes a creature called Kui (夔) that lived on a mountain in the East Sea. It looked like an ox, had no horns, and had only one leg. The text says that wind and rain came whenever it entered or left the water.

Another one-legged spirit appears in stories from southern China. The Wutong Shen (五通神) was sometimes called the One-Legged Wutong (獨腳五通). In the Yijian Zhi (夷堅志), Hong Mai wrote that people living south of the Yangtze River worshipped spirits that lived near rocks and trees. They were called Wutong in some places and Muke (木客) in others. The one-legged form was called the One-Legged Wutong. People believed these spirits could bring sudden wealth, but they could also cause harm.

Older Korean writings also describe one-legged spirits. The Haksan Haneon (鶴山閑言) and Oju Yeonmun Jangjeon Sango (五洲衍文長箋散稿) describe beings that wore hats and raincoats and moved by hopping on one leg. Their eyes were said to shine beneath their hats, especially on rainy days. They had a strong smell and could make people ill. They were also said to fear signs with people's names written on them. The writers compared these beings with the Chinese Shanxiao (山魈) and Wutong spirits.

In Korean, dokkakgwi (독각귀; 獨脚鬼) means "one-legged ghost". It is also used for a one-legged form of the dokkaebi. Not all dokkaebi are described as having one leg.

== In Korean folktales ==
In Korean folktales, the one-legged dokkaebi often challenges people to wrestling matches. Although it has only one leg, it is very difficult to defeat. Some stories say that a person must push it to the left to win. Pushing it to the right is said to be like trying to move a tree.

In the folktale The Bump on the Chin (혹부리 영감), an old man meets a group of dokkaebi and sings for them. They believe that his singing comes from the bump on his face. They remove the bump and give him gifts. Another old man tries to do the same, but the dokkaebi give him an extra bump instead.

== See also ==
- Sansei - a one legged yōkai
- Shanxiao - a one-legged mountain spirit
