= Dodomeki =

Yōkai

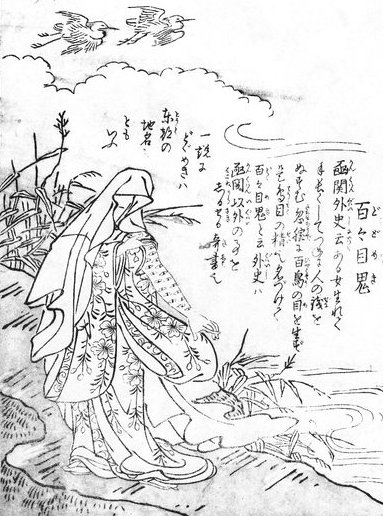
Toriyama Sekien's depiction of a dodomeki.

A dodomeki (百々目鬼) is a Japanese yōkai that's depicted as a human woman who is cursed with having long arms covered with hundreds of bird eyes due to her habit of stealing money. It is also called the todomeki.

== Mythology ==
Dodomeki were first described by the 18th century Japanese scholar Toriyama Sekien. The long arms of a dodomeki reflects the Japanese belief that a person with long arms has a tendency to steal. The bird eyes that grows on the dodomeki's arm are a reference to the Japanese dōsen, a copper coin with a hole in the middle of it that's commonly known as the chōmoku (Bird's eye).

The creature first appears in the Konjaku Gazu Zoku Hyakki by Toriyama Sekien, here he states the origins of the creature are found in the Kankan-gaishi, a book which may never have existed. It may have instead been inspired by the Dōmeki (百目鬼)

== Legends ==
=== Meeting Priest Chitoku ===
Nearly 400 years later during the Muromachi period, a priest named Chitoku was called to investigate a series of unexplained fires that broke out at the temple in a village near Mount Myōjin. He started to notice a woman covered with a robe near the temple whenever he held his sermons and discovered that she was the same dodomeki that Fujiwara no Hidesato had fought 400 years earlier. She had come back to suck up her remaining toxic fumes and blood that she lost during her last battle with Hidesato.

The temple was built on top of the battle site, so the dodomeki caused a series of fires to scare all the priests away. However, after consistently overhearing Chitoku preaching whenever she walked by the temple, the dodomeki became enlightened and vowed to never commit any more evil deeds for the rest of her life.

== In popular culture ==
- The Todomeki appears in the Shin Megami Tensei franchise.
- In the Yo-kai Watch franchise, the Todomeki is a black humanoid monster with 13 eyes and horns. It is known as Eyesoar in the English dub.
- Dodomeki was a playable character in Warriors Orochi 3 and Warriors Orochi 4.
- In the light novel series and later manga adaptation of Re:Monster, one of the hobgoblin members of the monster clan evolved into a dodomeki.
- The alien Eye Guy from the Ben 10 series is depicted with long arms covered with eyes.
- A version of the dodomeki is featured in the Chilla's Art indie game Hanako.
- In the Onmyōji franchise, Dodomeki (Doumeki in the Japanese version) is a summonable shikigami.
- The Stand The Grateful Dead from the manga and anime Jojo's Bizarre Adventure has the shape of a legless body covered with eyes and supported by its large arms.
- In Bob’s Burgers Dodomeki appears as a three-eyed toy Louise has, first named in the Season 7 premier, who appears in her fever dream with the same voice as Tina.
