= Nyūnaisuzume =

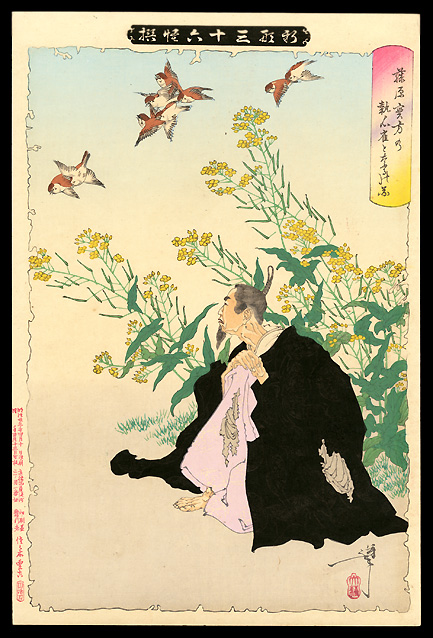
"Fujiwara no Sanekata becoming a sparrow from obsession" from New Forms of Thirty-Six Ghosts by Tsukioka Yoshitoshi

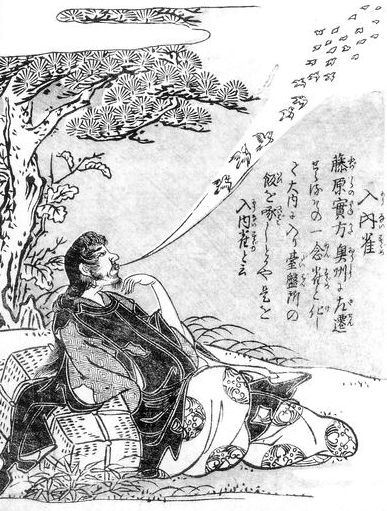
"Nyunaisuzume" from Konjaku Gazu Zoku Hyakki by Toriyama Sekien

Nyunaisuzume (入内雀) or Sanekata Suzume (実方雀) is a supernatural bird appearing in legends concerning Fujiwara no Sanekata, a poet of the Heian period.

== Overview ==
Fujiwara no Sanekata was a renowned poet who served as a courtier to Emperor Ichijō. However, after receiving backbiting remarks from Fujiwara no Yukinari, they got into an argument in the palace courtyard. Sanekata snatched Yukinari's cap and threw it away. Due to this blunder, he was demoted and transferred from Kyoto to Mutsu Province (Tōhoku region). At the time, Mutsu was considered a remote land akin to an island on land. While harboring resentment over this treatment and longing for Kyoto, Sanekata died in despair in Mutsu.

As soon as the news of Sanekata's death reached Kyoto, strange rumors began to circulate. It was said that every morning, a single sparrow would enter the Seiryōden in the Dairi (Imperial Palace) of Kyoto, peck at the rice on the serving table (daiban), and devour it in an instant. People believed that Sanekata's intense malice and desire to return to Kyoto had turned into a sparrow, or that Sanekata's spirit had possessed the sparrow. Because it was a sparrow (雀) invading (入) the Inner Palace (内裏), they called it "Nyunaisuzume" (入内雀), or "Sanekata Suzume." It is also said that this sparrow devoured agricultural crops, and people greatly feared this as the work of Sanekata's vengeful spirit.

Around the same time, a strange incident occurred at Kangaku-in, the Daigaku-bessō (academic facility) of the Fujiwara clan. A sparrow appeared in the dream of the head priest of Kangaku-in, Kanchi Shōnin. It identified itself as Sanekata, who had turned into a sparrow out of longing for Kyoto, and told the priest to recite sutras for his sake. The next morning, the priest found the carcass of a single sparrow in the temple forest. Believing it must be the transformed figure of Sanekata, he built a mound to mourn the spirit.

Later, Kangaku-in was renamed Mori-Toyoyama Kōjakuji (commonly called Suzume-dera, or Sparrow Temple) and has since moved its location to Sakyō Ward in Kyoto. Due to repeated fires, its scale has gradually diminished, and the atmosphere of the original Kangaku-in is fading. However, the aforementioned mound, called "Suzume-zuka" (Sparrow Mound), still exists, and memorial services for Sanekata continue to be held to this day.

Birds and insects that visit at certain times are often identified with human souls. There is also a theory that because the real Russet sparrow (Nyūnaisuzume) breeds in the Tōhoku region during the summer and migrates across the country in the autumn causing damage to crops, it was imagined to be the incarnation of Sanekata who had been exiled to Tōhoku.
