= Edo-period village =

Human settlements in the Edo period of Japan

During the Edo period of Japanese history, villages (村, mura) were self-governing administrative units, led by the village headman (庄屋, shōya).

== Description ==
The development of mura reflected specific changes that show the transition of the Edo community from medieval agricultural to mature administrative unit. Before the Edo period, samurai administered the villages, but during the sword hunt they were put to a choice: give up their sword and status and remain on the land as a peasant, or live in a castle town (城下町, jōkamachi) as a paid retainer of the local daimyō (lord). Villages were also manufacturing units: In western Japan, cottage industries developed, with each family of the village taking over a one step of the production process.

Villages were taxed as a unit, with the village headman responsible for taxation. Taxes were paid in rice, often 40 to 50% of the harvest. Criminal punishments could also be imposed on the village as a unit.

Prior to the emergence of religious authorities such as the Buddhist establishment, mura - along with the family (ie) - helped establish Japanese cultural practices such as ancestral veneration and funerary rites. Some of the villages served as enclaves or base-villages for the miko or female shamans.
