= Raiden =

Raiden may refer to:

- Raijin, also called Raiden or Raiden-sama, the god of thunder and lightning in Japanese mythology

== Fiction and characters ==
=== Arcade and video games ===
- Raiden (Mortal Kombat) (sometimes spelled Rayden), a character in the Mortal Kombat video game series
- Raiden (series), a series of scrolling shooter arcade games
  - Raiden (video game), the first game in the series
  - Raiden II
  - Raiden DX
  - Raiden III
  - Raiden IV
  - Raiden V
- The Raiden Fighters series, a later arcade shooter series that uses the Raiden name.
  - Raiden Fighters
  - Raiden Fighters 2, subtitled Operation Hell Dive
  - Raiden Fighters Jet
- Raiden (Metal Gear), a character in Metal Gear series
- Raiden (Fatal Fury), a character in the Fatal Fury series
- RAIDEN series, a series of Virturoids from the Sega game Virtual On
- Raiden Mei (Chinese: 雷电芽衣), a character in Honkai Impact 3rd
- Raiden Shogun, a character in 2020 video game Genshin Impact

=== Other fiction and characters ===
- Raiden (film), a 1928 film directed by Shōzō Makino
- Gwen Raiden, a minor character on the TV series Angel
- Trainbots, a fictional team of Autobots that can form Raiden in Transformers: The Headmasters

== People ==
- Raiden Tameemon (Seki Tarōkichi; 1767–1825), a Japanese sumo wrestler during the Kansei era
- Raiden Shin'emon (Wasuke Kazuyoshi; 1842–1886), a Japanese sumo wrestler during the Genji era
- Raiden (DJ), a South Korean DJ and record producer

== Other ==
- Mitsubishi J2M "Raiden", a Japanese World War II fighter aircraft
- AMD Raiden, codename for a project by Advanced Micro Devices concerning client computing

== See also ==
- Ikazuchi (disambiguation)
- Inazuma (disambiguation)
- Lightning bolt (disambiguation)
- Thunderbolt (disambiguation)
- Thunderclap (disambiguation)
