= Raiden V =

2016 video game

- Developer: MOSS (Note: Nintendo Switch port developed by Kaminari Games)
- Publishers: JP: MOSS; WW: UFO Interactive Games; EU: PQube (PS4)
- Composer: Yoshimi Kudo
- Series: Raiden
- Platforms: Xbox One; PlayStation 4; Microsoft Windows; Nintendo Switch
- Release: Xbox One: JP: February 25, 2016; WW: May 11, 2016; Director's Cut; PlayStation 4, Microsoft Windows: JP: September 14, 2017; NA: October 5, 2017; EU: October 5, 2017; Nintendo Switch: WW: July 25, 2019
- Genre: Shoot 'em up
- Modes: Single player, multiplayer

Raiden V (Note: Japanese: 雷電V, romanized: Raiden Faibu) is a shoot 'em up video game in the Raiden series developed by MOSS. It was released in Japan for the Xbox One on February 25, 2016, with a director's cut version being released worldwide for PlayStation 4 and Microsoft Windows in 2017, followed by a Nintendo Switch version on July 25, 2019, making it the first Raiden game to be made available on a Nintendo console since Raiden Trad on the Super Nintendo Entertainment System.

== Gameplay ==
Gameplay in Raiden V is a mixture combination of the prior installments including Raiden Fighters sub-series/spinoffs, but the plot incorporates real-life locations, with the player craft fighting enemies in New York, the Middle East, France, England, Belgium, and Sweden.

Like the Raiden Fighters series and Raiden IV: Overkill, players have a choice of three aircraft: The Azuma from Japan (the aircraft from the early games), Spirit of Dragon from United States and Moulin Rouge from France. They all have different grades of power, defense, mobility and a sub-weapon of fixed power. Unlike Raiden IV and Raiden Fighters Jet, all aircraft have the same pre-installed bombs.

Another change with Raiden V is the introduction of a shield/energy bar, allowing the player to take a number of hits before being destroyed. However, only one ship is provided, thus on destruction, the player will lose their score and be asked to continue.

"Flash Point" returns since its introduction in Raiden III. There are five levels of Flash Point gauge, with the chain score challenging players to make it to the online leaderboard. Killing enemies rapidly will fill the gauge more efficiently thus improving the score multiplier.

Raiden V also introduces the Cheer System where online players can cheer each other to unlock the skill Cheer Call. In tight situations, using Cheer Call will cancel all enemy bullets at once and allow players to greatly boost sub-weapons for a short time until the Cheer Call gauge is depleted. Boosted sub-weapons cause heavy damage and instant attack speed. The Cheer Call gauge can increase slowly by progressive play and rapidly every time the player presses "Cheer" to other players who get any achievement, such as destroying a certain number of enemies or defeating a boss without taking damage. Players that receive many cheer counts will increase the cheer call gauge faster.

== Plot ==
The story of Raiden V follows the previous games. Raiden V is the first game in the series to have a detailed story. Named characters engage in fully voiced dialogue, along with narration during the story screens. The story fleshes out several narrative elements that had gone unexplained in previous games, such as the origin of the Fighting Thunder project and the Crystals' motives. Depending on the stage route taken by the player, the story changes slightly while not affecting gameplay, as the characters become more aware of each other's true motives the higher the rank of a given stage is.

The game's story takes place 17 years after humanity's war with the Crystals began. The Vanquish Crystal Defense, or VCD, awaits an attack order to launch Fighting Thunder to assist the North American army, who have been decimated by attacks by the Crystals. Aboard the VCD flagship, the Bellwether, commanding officer Richard "Max" Maxwell (voiced by Xander Mobus in English) and communications officer Eshiria Portman (Rina Hoshino) lament that the VCD and the Fighting Thunders are being held back during what they consider a Crystal contamination far bigger than in the past.

After receiving the long-awaited attack order, Fighting Thunder assists the North American army, defeating a battleship that was taken over by the Crystals. Max and Eshiria receive word from VCD's Middle East branch that there is major Crystal activity in the region. Eshiria notes that the energy signatures are the same as what they detected in North America. They then discover a cave full of Crystals. Max has a shipment of the Crystals from the cave sent to a French shipping port en route to the Large Hadron Collider, under the suspicion that the Crystals may have signs of intelligence. With this suspicion, Max orders an SOS call to the French shipping port, even under the doubts of his superior, international peace councilor Helga Lindenbaum (Laura Post). Max's suspicions were proven right, with the Crystals attacking the port. After fending off the port attack, Max realized that the Crystals can upgrade any machinery they contaminate.

Max orders a mission to the Large Hadron Collider facility, expecting a massive Crystal presence there. His suspicions are again proven right, as the Crystals have laid siege to the facility in an orderly military fashion. Max hypothesized that the Crystals have a command structure. After clearing out the Crystal contamination at the Large Hadron Collider facility, a surveillance drone detected on the Bellwether's deck steals the Crystals and delivers them to a pirate mercenary, Valbarossa Hawkeye (Sarah Anne Williams), who plans to transport them to an unknown facility.

Max orders Fighting Thunder to pursue Valbarossa Hawkeye and retake the Crystals. Valbarossa Hawkeye detects Fighting Thunder and orders their flagship to attack. As the Valbarossa's ship is being disabled by Fighting Thunder, the stolen Crystals suddenly started to contaminate the ship's command bridge, upgrading it with an energy beam cannon to use against Fighting Thunder. After defeating the contaminated ship, Valbarossa Hawkeye, who reveals herself to be a woman, joins Max and Eshiria and boards the Bellwether.

Valbarossa Hawkeye reveals her client to be Lieutenant Walter Erick Campbell (Erik Scott Kimerer), head of VCD's weapons development division and a researcher for the SHIFT organization. With the Valbarossa's help, VCD locates the SHIFT facility and orders Fighting Thunder to raid the facility. Earlier, Campbell reminded to Max that it was the efforts of SHIFT researching and utilizing Crystal technology that the Fighting Thunder project and the Bellwether exist, and that the entire war effort is dependent on him. During the SHIFT raid, Campbell reiterated his stance on SHIFT's continued research, denouncing the Montevideo Agreement that bans research on Crystal technology. However, Max says in response that he, being on the front lines, and the rest of the world know how dangerous the Crystals are, since they contaminated Valbarossa Hawkeye's flagship. Max and Campbell eventually fall out, and Fighting Thunder is ordered to destroy the SHIFT facility. After destroying the facility, Fighting Thunder attempts to escape, but Campbell spites Max and Fighting Thunder, sending out mobile weapons to attack them.

Following the attack on the SHIFT facility, Campbell was placed under custody of the VCD. Helga Lindenbaum confirmed all of Max and Eshiria's hypotheses of the Crystals, culminating with the conclusion that one of them is able to relay information to all other Crystals and the machines they contaminated, comparing it to Carl Jung's concept of the collective unconscious. Helga then orders Max and Eshiria to leave Earth's atmosphere and launch a counteroffensive against the Crystals on their homeworld.

Upon arriving to the Crystals' home planet, Max and Eshiria notice that there are no signs of life and is completely overrun with Crystals. Detecting large energy signatures underground, they order Fighting Thunder to penetrate the interior of the planet. Eshiria discovers that the atmospheric composition of the planet is exactly like Mars. The data that Fighting Thunder relayed to the Bellwether reveals that the large Crystals detected within the planet are made up of the same composition as water. Max, Eshiria, and Valbarossa Hawkeye realized that the Crystals' attacks over the past 17 years were not a normal alien invasion. Their true motives were to reset the planet Earth by annihilating all life on the planet through pollution and contaminating their weapons and machinery before cleaning up the pollution and making the planet habitable again.

The Crystals are intending to terraform Earth to make it like their home world, and it is likely they've done this to other worlds too, essentially spreading from one planet to the next by transforming them into copies of their original home world.

The game features multiple endings depending on how the player performed during gameplay. One ending has VCD return to the Solar System after the offensive against the Crystal homeworld to see what looks to be Mars, only to find out it was the Earth reduced to a lifeless red rock by the Crystals. Another ending has the Bellwether unable to return to Earth due to damage sustained during the final battle, but with the Earth celebrating the Fighting Thunder victory over the Crystals in their homeworld, Helga sends a rescue ship that will come for them in a month, and Max cautions everyone to stay vigilant in case of another attack in the future.

== Reception ==
Reception

Aggregate score
Aggregator	Score
Metacritic	XONE: 75/100; PC: 77/100; PS4: 73/100

Review score
Publication	Score
Destructoid	7.5/10

Raiden V was released to generally favorable reviews, according to Metacritic, which provided aggregated scores of 75 and 73 for the Xbox One and PlayStation 4 versions, respectively. Destructoid gave it an 7.5, calling it a "Solid and definitely have an audience. There could be some hard-to-ignore faults, but the experience is fun."
