= Raiden Fighters Aces =

2008 video game

- Developer: Gulti
- Publishers: JP: Success Corporation; NA: Valcon Games; EU: Tradewest
- Series: Raiden
- Platform: Xbox 360
- Release: JP: March 27, 2008; NA: May 7, 2009; EU: October 29, 2010
- Genre: Scrolling shooter
- Modes: Single-player, multiplayer

Raiden Fighters Aces (ライデンファイターズ エイシズ, Raiden Faitāzu Eishizu) is a 2008 video game for the Xbox 360, published by Japanese computer software company Success Corporation. It is a compilation of all three video games in the Raiden Fighters series by Seibu Kaihatsu: the first Raiden Fighters (1996), Raiden Fighters 2: Operation Hell Dive (1997), and Raiden Fighters Jet (1998).

== Features ==
Raiden Fighters Aces takes advantage of the connectivity of the Xbox 360 and implements various features. The features include:

- Full support for vertical monitors
- Online high-score rankings
- Upload and download game replay data
- Strategy guide directly on the game DVD
- Gameplay videos of Japan's best players on all three games

== Development ==
=== Previous conversion attempts ===
Before Raiden Fighters Aces, there were multiple attempts to port Raiden Fighters games to home consoles; these attempts have all failed.

- Electronic Arts Victor was working on a Sega Saturn port of the first Raiden Fighters in 1997.
- In 2002, a now-defunct Japanese company, New World System, was working on ports of Raiden Fighters and Raiden Fighters 2 for the Xbox and PC under the name of Raiden Fighters Evolution. The game was planned to release in Japan in Spring 2003 and would support Xbox Live features, such as multiplayer, voice chat and sharing videos of gameplay.

=== Demo ===
A demo version of this game was released in March 2008, and included one stage from each title. It included Arcade (NORMAL, BOSS RUSH, EXPERT) and Training modes. Available fighters are the standard craft, without secret fighters. Games were set at normal difficulty. Xbox Live features and replays were not implemented.

=== Update patch ===
The Japanese version of the game received an update patch to version 1.1. The patch does the following:

- Fixes:

- Improved player control.
- Sound glitches fixed.
- In Raiden Fighters' boss rush mode, a bug during the stage 3 boss was fixed.
- In Raiden Fighters Jet, the Ixion's slave could not be used in training mode.
- Saving the gamer tags in leader board replays and scores.

- Additions:

- Added score attack mode.
- In Raiden Fighters Jet, full run mode is added to all stages.
- When continuing, player can choose the Slave.
- In leaderboard, friend ranking is added.
- Added credit setting. The feature of increasing credits based on play time is removed.
- In arcade mode, the option to disable medals is added.
- In training mode, player can set player lives stock and amount of armor the slave has.
- In Raiden Fighters Jet training, an Ixion mode is added for all fighters.
- In score name entry, the addition of default setting option.

After using the patch, the time of play is reset to zero, game replays may become incompatible with the patched version. The patch could be downloaded only through the Xbox Live service.

== Release ==
The Onslaught Raiden Fighters Special Edition is an official game strategy DVD of the game, produced by INH CO., LTD. It was based on The Onslaught Raiden Fighters walkthrough video series, but with remastered video footage, new tutorial layout, audio commentaries from producers, players, composers. The INH shop order also includes Raiden Fighters Aces Secret File, which includes additional strategies and bonus game production materials. The DVD is included in the limited version of the game.
