= The Raiden Project =

1995 video game compilation

- Developer: Seibu Kaihatsu
- Publishers: JP: Seibu Kaihatsu; NA: Sony Computer Entertainment; EU: Ocean Software
- Composer: Go Sato
- Series: Raiden
- Platform: PlayStation
- Release: JP: January 27, 1995; NA: September 9, 1995; PAL: November 12, 1995
- Genre: Scrolling shooter
- Modes: Single-player, multiplayer

Raiden Project (Note: 雷電プロジェクト, Raiden Purojekuto), known outside Japan as The Raiden Project, is a 1995 vertically scrolling shooter video game developed and published by Seibu Kaihatsu for the PlayStation. It is a compilation of the arcade games Raiden (1990) and Raiden II (1993). It was released in Japan on January 27, 1995, for North America by Sony Computer Entertainment as an original launch title on September 9, 1995, and in Europe by Ocean Software in November 12, 1995. This was the only console release of Raiden II and unlike previous ports, these versions are based directly on the arcade originals. The Project version of the first Raiden was later re-released as a standalone title in Japan on retail in 2002, and later available as a download from the Japanese PlayStation Network store, which could be played on either a PlayStation 3 or a PlayStation Portable. Hamster Corporation re-released the game as part of their Console Archives series for the Nintendo Switch 2 and PlayStation 5 in October 2026.

== Plot ==
The story of Raiden takes place in the year 2090, when a race of collective alien lifeforms known as the Crystals made Earth a target of invasion. In response, the world gathered together under one organization, the Vanquish Crystal Defense, and developed a cutting-edge weapon built from Crystal Technology: the Fighting Thunder aircraft. Fighting Thunder is launched as the last hope for humanity's survival.

In Raiden II, three years have passed since the Crystals were defeated. The remnants of the Crystal invasion force regrouped to launch another invasion on Earth. The Vanquish Crystal Defense had developed a new model of the Fighting Thunder with a new weapon for this new battle in humanity's war against the Crystals.

== Gameplay ==
Both games consist of eight vertical scrolling stages of increasing difficulty. The player controls the Raiden fighters, engaging enemies and dodging their attacks. Collectible items include bombs and missile powerups as well as score-increasing medals. Both games in this compilation can be played by either one player or two players. In two player mode, both players play simultaneously and have a special attack that produces special projectiles that damage enemies by shooting the other player craft.

== Additions in the port ==
The opening animation is a 3D rendering of the player's ship taking on the first stage boss from Raiden II.

Raiden Project includes a Horizontal Mode. Users can turn their monitors vertically and play the game in its proper arcade aspect ratio.

The conversion includes difficulty settings, credit limits, selection between original and rearranged soundtrack, on screen text positioning and the ability to save high scores with a memory card.

== Reception ==
Reception

Review scores
Publication	Score
Computer and Video Games	90/100
Edge	6/10
Electronic Gaming Monthly	8/10, 8.5/10, 9/10, 8/10
EP Daily	5/10
Famitsu	27/40
Game Informer	7/10
GamesMaster	80%, 73%
Hyper	80/100
IGN	6/10
Next Generation	2/5
PlayStation Official Magazine – UK	7/10
Play	68%
Dengeki PlayStation	90/100, 90/100, 95/100, 75/100
PlayStation Plus	72/100
SonyPro	8/10
Ultimate Future Games	85%

According to Famitsu, The Raiden Project sold 61,346 copies in its first week on the market and 120,651 copies during its lifetime in Japan. The Japanese publication Micom BASIC Magazine ranked the game second in popularity in its April 1995 issue. It received generally favorable reviews.

Electronic Gaming Monthly's four reviewers described it as an outstanding arcade translation. They especially praised the inclusion of Raiden II, as they generally felt that the original Raiden had become dated and that Raiden II was more challenging and fun. GamePro's Bonehead, in contrast, commented that both games are very dated, with repetitive gameplay and overdone concepts. Bonehead also complained of slowdown in the two-player mode and concluded that The Raiden Project is "closer to where games have been than where they're going". Next Generation assessed that "Raiden Project is a solid indicator of the PlayStation's ability to manipulate sprites and as such will find a welcome home with early adopters. But with endless credits at your disposal, and some poorly structured action, it's an ultimately shallow experience".
