= Castle of Shikigami III =

2006 video game

- Japanese Xbox 360 box art
- Developers: Alfa System, Skonec; Barnhouse Effect (Xbox 360), Cosmo Machia (Steam)
- Publishers: JP: Taito (Arcade); JP: Cyberfront Corporation (Win); JP: Arc System Works (Xbox 360, Wii); NA: Aksys Games (Wii); WW: Cosmo Machia Inc. (Steam)
- Platforms: Arcade, Microsoft Windows, Xbox 360, Wii
- Release: Arcade: JP: February 2006; Microsoft Windows: JP: September 29, 2006; WW: March 12, 2025; Xbox 360: JP: December 13, 2007; Wii: JP: December 13, 2007; NA: May 13, 2008
- Genre: Scrolling shooter
- Modes: Single player, multiplayer
- Arcade system: Taito Type X

Castle of Shikigami III (Shikigami no Shiro episode-3 or 式神の城 III in Japan) is a bullet hell released in Japan in video arcades in 2005, the Windows platform in 2006 and for the Xbox 360 and Wii in 2007. It is the fourth game in the Shikigami no Shiro series, following two shooters and a spin-off adventure game. The game was published in North America, for the Wii by Aksys Games with only an English voice dub. It was released on May 13, 2008.

== Gameplay ==
The game plays much like its shooter predecessors. As before, there are five levels each in two parts, with a boss at the end of each part. Before major bosses and between levels there are cutscenes with dialogue featuring the character(s) in play. The dialogue is unique for each different pair of characters selected, resulting in, according to the publisher, 55 different scenarios.

Each character has a primary standard attack, which is generally forward-shooting bullets. This is activated by tapping the fire button or by pressing auto-fire button. The secondary attack is known as a shikigami, activated by holding the fire button, or pressing a dedicated button on consoles. This attack is often more powerful, but slows or stops the character completely. Each character's shikigami is unique and also comes in two variants that are chosen at the start of the game. Finally, characters have a limited supply of bombs, their effects also unique to each character.

Coins are released by enemies destroyed using normal or shikigami attacks, but not by bomb attacks. Coins are now collected automatically, regardless of whether the primary or shikigami attack was used. When an enemy is destroyed using the players shikigami attack, the coin bonus increases by 10 points for every coin collected (up to 10000 points).

The Tension Bonus System returns, whereby the player's weapons are strengthened and the score is multiplied when the player grazes enemy bullets. Also, the player can expend a bomb to allow for an automatic TBS for a short period of time. In this mode, player's normal shots are fired at increased rate and inflict stronger damage. At the end of the stage, coin bonus collected when defeating an enemy with maximum Tension Bonus is added to player's score. Hi-Tension Max is introduced in this game, which causes enemy to drop more coins when destroyed. High Tension Max is activated using 1 bomb stock.

When the player collides with an enemy bullet or object, the player loses a life unit. If the player's life bar reaches zero, the game ends. Up to 3 lives can be stored at once. When player is hit, player gains 1 extra bomb. Bomb stock is replenished by accumulating game score. Players can hold up to 5 bombs.

If the boss is not destroyed when the timer reaches 0, an invulnerable 'ghost' will enter stage to chase the player(s). After the ghost appears for a certain time period, the boss is killed.

Game modes:

- Easy mode: Bombs are automatically used when the player is hit, but the bomb gauge does not regenerate, and the game ends after defeating Freedom Wind, the boss of stage 3–2.
- S3MIX mode: Rearranged Castle Shikigami 2 BGM is used in place of the main soundtrack.
- Extreme mode: If the game is played in this mode, enemies and bosses fire faster bullets, and fires additional bullets when destroyed. In the Windows, Xbox, and Wii versions, two additional Extreme modes are added, which changes the speed of counterattack bullets.
- Practice mode: Allows the player(s) to re-play a selected stage.
- Director's mode: Uses readjusted settings.

The Wii and Xbox 360 versions added the Boss Attack mode and the Dramatic Change Mode. Dramatic change mode allows one player to select two characters and switch between them at any time. Story events will change depending on the combination of characters used. An art gallery, music player, and replays of the dialogue cutscenes are unlocked as the player progresses in the game.

The Xbox 360 version also included online ranking (via Xbox Live) and achievement point features. The Windows version can be played in higher resolutions (up to 1024x768). The player(s) receive a ranking of SS to F and a title whenever completing a stage, based on his or her performance.

== Characters ==
=== Playable Characters ===
==== Koutarou Kuga ====
The protagonist of the series. Due to the death of his longtime shikigami, Sazae, he has come back weaker than before. He still makes the mistake of calling out for Sazae and causes blunders for those around him. This is the story of his rise back from his loss. He has grown taller, and sadness and frustration have cast a shadow over him. But once an incident occurs, Kuga takes action more passionately than before. He has gotten rid of his school uniform and appears in a cool new outfit chosen by Fumiko. He also works as a translator and interpreter.

==== Sayo Yuuki ====
A shrine maiden that was resurrected when she was fused together with Koutaro's shikigami, Sazae. She feels jealous (and guilty) watching Koutaro disheartened due to the loss of his partner. Her blunt attitude toward him has changed, and she now tries to be helpful - while rejecting him at the same time. Since her former shikigami, Yata, is a national treasure and cannot be leased out, she has gone out on her own. Since their battle potential is only half when alone, Koutaro and Sayo travel together. Whether her fusion with Sazae is the cause or not, Sayo's kimono has a tendency to slip off of her shoulder.

==== Batu Barai ====
A brooding exorcist hired by Emilio Stanburke. He is an apostate priest that wields an extending spear in the shape of a cross. He is tired of Emilio's nationalism and wants to hurry and get the job done. He considers the foreign guests as demons and has written a petition to headquarters asking for orders to subjugate (i.e. punish) them. He likes hard liquor.

==== Emilio Stanburke ====
A good-looking young boy with black hair and suspenders. Only 10 years old, he is a member of the noblest of the royal families in Alcaland and detests foreign intervention into its domestic matters. He is a high-spirited boy who said: "Our country has the strengths of its own tradi- tions". After stating this, he went out to investigate on his own. He always has a worried look on his face, what some people refer to as a Majar melancholic. He uses a demon known as Devour, which can change into various shapes (in Christian countries, they are called shikigami). He is very stubborn and proud, and though he has a good personality, he is fixated on authority and has a slight tendency to look down on commoners.

==== Fumiko Odette Van Stein ====
A gorgeous witch, in many different ways. She is said to be more of a villain than the greatest enemy in the series. Her hobby is to steal the men of other women. Her second hobby is trampling upon people. She has arrived in Alcaland to return to her homeland - and go on a honeymoon. For Fumiko, Alcaland is a memorable place she visited a number of times when she was a young girl. She looks around her surroundings with fond memories and can't help but feel melancholic.

==== Roger Sasuke ====
An American ninja. At this point, Japan's international contribution, psychic abilities, and investigation have nothing to do with him, but Roger looks forward to this trip and participates on his own dime (he even created the travel pamphlets and handed them out). From one perspective, he's one of the people that participate in this case with the impurest of intentions, along with Fumiko. He is Koutaro Kuga's good friend and a serious Wapanese. However, his ninjutsu and methods are authentic, having learned them from the real deal - even his ninja sword is genuine. Because of this, he's as useful as Gennojo, a professional investigator. He is bummed that he is the only one Nagino doesn't call papa.

==== Gennojo Hyuga ====
A psychic private investigator. He is one of the tsukigamizoku (Moongod tribe) living in Japan and is an okami. At first he was against going on this mission because it was a request from the government, but since he was in dire straits with his living expenses, he finally gave in to the compensation and went on his first trip abroad. Whether it is due to pride or not, he tries to act like an avid traveler by acting like he knows it all, reading guidebooks, and studying foreign languages. He's a rather adorable middle-aged man who likes to call himself a young man. Once again, though his character has changed, he partners up with Mihee to solve the incident. He is a proud and stubborn man who always ends up volunteering to take on the most difficult of tasks himself.

==== Mihee Kim ====
A fighting doctor from Seoul, Korea, holding her head while on a plane thinking "Why me?". Her left hand trembles and is said to be able to kill anyone who touches it. When her hand trembles in the operating room, patients often plead for their lives. Because of this, she has the misfortune of being called a quack, even though she is a skilled surgeon. Due to her bold, free-spirited nature, she did not get along with her conservative parents and left to study abroad: she has not returned to her homeland. Mihee's an avid traveler, but when she went to visit some relatives in Japan, their dojo was closed and they were in prison. As she stood there stunned, a well-dressed investigator saying he was a friend of the relatives approached her. She somehow ended up going to Alcaland.

==== Nagino Ise ====
She is a nuclear attack-class troublemaker, messing with the relationships of Gennojo and Koutaro, who she both calls papa, and Fumiko and Sayo, who she both calls mama. She is 9 years old and is a happy elementary school student who isn't going to school. She has the mystical power of turning the words she says into reality. As a guardian, she carries the rabbit deity known as "Strider" in her backpack.

==== Reika Kirishima ====
A female police officer, number 0, division 0 in the metropolitan police department. She is known as Time Gal. She has long, silky green hair, wears a bare mid-riff outfit, and has long slim legs. With her anachronous costume and mouth, she strives to be a first-class time criminal. She really has time jumping capabilities as she says, but most people don't believe her (to her dismay). Incidentally, she is only 17 years old. She is a high school student as well as a police officer. Reika travels anywhere from the years 1888 and 2145, and she can be seen appearing in various locations (like in the background).

Reika Kirishima is based heavily on the protagonist of the arcade game Time Gal.

==== Munchausen ====
He is like a young uncle to Fumiko, and is Koutaro Kuga's good friend. He shows another side of himself as the versatile butler, and this time around, other characters can even see him looking cool without his glasses.
