= Shooty Skies =

2015 video game

- Developer: Mighty Games
- Publisher: Mighty Games
- Engine: Unity
- Platforms: iOS; Android; Microsoft Windows; macOS; Linux
- Genre: Shoot 'em up
- Mode: Single-player

Shooty Skies is a 2015 shoot 'em up game created by Mighty Games for iOS, Android, Windows, macOS, and Linux. It was released on iOS on September 30, 2015, and on Android on November 6, 2015; it was later released on Windows, macOS, and Linux on March 6, 2018.

It is an endless game that involves shooting all enemies coming up from the screen, including broken TVs, robots and arcade machines. Its gameplay is loosely inspired to classic arcade games including Galaga, Space Invaders, 1942, Xevious and Raiden. The player can play as one of 33 characters which can be unlocked through a random draw (bought for 500 coins) or an in-app purchase of $0.99.

Another version, titled Shooty Skies Overdrive, was announced on June 23, 2020, in the official Shooty Skies website, this version lets the player to shoot all enemies on a retro world in virtual reality, it was released and available on Oculus and Steam.
