= Gunslinger Stratos: The Animation =

Japanese anime television series

ガンスリンガー ストラトス -THE ANIMATION- (Gansuringā Sutoratosu: Ji Animēshon)
- Genre: Action; Sci-fi
- Created by: Square Enix; Gen Urobuchi
- Anime television series
- Directed by: Shinpei Ezaki
- Produced by: Kazuki Adachi; Shūichi Kobayashi; Mayumi Takita; Shin'ichiro Kitazawa; Tomoyuki Ōwada; Satoshi Eguchi
- Written by: Norimitsu Kaihō; Ukyō Kodachi; Ryō Morise; Kiyomune Miwa
- Music by: Tetsuya Kobayashi
- Studio: A-1 Pictures
- Licensed by: AUS: Madman Entertainment; NA: Aniplex of America
- Original network: Tokyo MX, BS11, GYT, GTV
- Original run: April 4, 2015 – June 20, 2015
- Episodes: 12
- icon

Gunslinger Stratos: The Animation (ガンスリンガー ストラトス -THE ANIMATION-, Gansuringā Sutoratosu: Ji Animēshon) is an anime television series adaptation of the Gunslinger Stratos video game series. It premiered on April 4, 2015.

== Plot ==
The story revolves on a group of gunslingers, each from the two universes (Frontier Stratos and the 17th Far East Imperial City Management District) who participate in Operation Stratos, particularly on a group of four childhood friends: Tohru Kazasumi, Kyōka Katagiri, Kyōma Katagiri, and Shizune Rindo, who all must confront their own flaws and differences when they battle their alternate selves from another universe in order to survive.

== Characters ==
=== Main characters ===
Tohru Kazasumi (風澄徹, Kazasumi Tōru)
Voiced by: Atsushi Abe
Main Weapon: Pistol (x2)
The main protagonist, superhero and character of the story. A high school student who does his best to avoid violence as possible. Tohru mainly wears his school uniform, but during combat, he wears a black outfit which is noticeably made up of a long scarf, a jacket, and a shirt inside that jacket, and his scarf has a star pin on the right side. Tohru's ability is the "Ninth Dimensional Space-Orientation", which allows him to understand special relations and control his location within the flow of time. He has a strong desire to protect Kyōka and is always considering her safety. Tohru has feelings for Kyōka and in the future, he and Kyōka get married.
Kyōka Katagiri (片桐鏡華, Katagiri Kyoka)
Voiced by: Hisako Kanemoto
Main Weapon: Machine gun
A childhood friend of Tohru. She has an ever-ready attitude and her mind is always concerned for Tohru's safety as she wants to protect him. Kyōka's has a rocky relationship with her older brother Kyōma since he is always interfering in her relationship with Tohru and getting in the way of the two off them. Kyōka will often hit or slap Kyōma followed by calling him "Stupid Big Brother" whenever Kyōma becomes overly protective of her or interrupts her time with Tohru. At times she will tell Tohru that he should become "President of the World" and kick out Kyōma from the Katagiri Group and run it himself. Kyōka is in love with Tohru and in the future, she and Tohru get married.
Kyōma Katagiri (片桐鏡磨, Katagiri Kyoma)
Voiced by: Masakazu Nishida
Main Weapon: Revolver/M61 Vulcan
Kyōka's older brother. He is a very serious and prideful person. Despite his personality, he is always protective of his younger sister Kyōka to the point where he even has guards secretly follow her around without her knowledge of it. Kyōma strongly dislikes and disapproves of Tohru's close relationship with Kyōka as he sees Tohru as a man that won't be able protect her. Kyōma will go various lengths to prevent them from being together even to go as far as physically hitting Tohru. These actions will often come at the cost of being hit or slapped by Kyōka followed by being called "Stupid Big Brother". Despite his disapproval of Tohru and Kyōka's relationship, he does seem to show some respect and trust in Tohru as the series progresses.
Shizune Rindo (竜胆しづね, Rindō Shizune)
Voiced by: Kana Ueda
Main Weapon: UZI (x2)
Kyōma's personal bodyguard, she is a young descendant of an assassin clan. The Rindo family has served under the Katagiri family for generations as bodyguards, spies, and assassins. Despite her small size, Shizune is very agile and proficient with blades and carries a number of throwing items (knives, small swords, blades, etc.) and some exploding devices. As Kyōma's personal bodyguard, she is very protective of him to the point where she will even sacrifice her life for his without hesitation. It is implied that she has romantic feeling for Kyōma.
Remy Ohdner (レミー・オードナー, Remī Ōdonā)
Voiced by: Miyuki Sawashiro
Main Weapon: Stationary Gatling Beam Vulcan/Deflecting Shield
Remy is a child who possessed ESP powers. He was subjected to experiments and lab probings since he could first remember. Soon after, he was drafted into the war with Frontier S. Remy is entirely reliant on his psychic powers to fight. He uses his ability to fly and manipulate objects for both offense and defense. His power can be amplified by directly consuming an Energy Cube, but the resultant boost drives his power beyond his ability to control it.
Miki (ミキ, Miki)
Voiced by: Akane Fujita
Miki is a child that appears in Tohru's dream in the beginning of the series. She appears throughout the series as a "ghost" that guides Tohru and gives him visions to save both universe's futures as well as hers from being swallowed by the Dead End. Due to coming back to the past, she cannot remember her own name to which Tohru names her "Miki" (The character Mirrai = Future, but read as "Miki"). The two make a promise to one day meet again in the future. At the end of the series, it is revealed that she is the granddaughter of Tohru and Kyōka.

=== Other characters ===
==== Gunslinger Stratos ====
Aaron Burroughs (アーロン・バロウズ, Āron Barōzu)
Voiced by: Takehito Koyasu
Olga Jenetine (オルガ・ジェンテイン, Oruga Jentein)
Voiced by: Sayaka Ohara
Ryō Kusakage (草陰稜, Kusakage Ryō)
Voiced by: Sōichirō Hoshi
Akira Rakando (羅漢堂旭, Rakando Akira)
Voiced by: Rikiya Koyama
Jonathan Sizemore (ジョナサン・サイズモア, Jonasan Saizumoa)
Voiced by: Yumiko Kobayashi
XI988 (ξ988（クシー-）, Kushī)
Voiced by: Saki Fujita
Mondo Makabe (真加部 主水, Makabe Mondo)
Voiced by: Yōsuke Akimoto
Lyudmila N. Ignatova (リュドミラ・ニコラエヴナ・イグナートワ, Ryudomira Nikoraevuna Igunātowa)
Voiced by: Saori Hayami
Matsurika Shino (篠生 茉莉, Shinō Matsurika)
Voiced by: Mariya Ise
Srinivasa Sen (シュリニヴァーサ・セン, Shurinivu~āsa-sen)
Voiced by: Tōru Ōkawa

==== Gunslinger Stratos 2 ====
Ricardo Martini (リカルド・マルティーニ, Rikarudo Marutīni)
Voiced by: Junichi Suwabe
Tsukasa Suo (蘇芳 司, Suō Tsukasa)
Voiced by: Shinnosuke Tachibana
Sakura Ayanokoji (綾小路 咲良, Ayanokōji Sakura)
Voiced by: China Kitahara
Sarah Tendoji (天堂寺 セイラ, Tendōji Seira)
Voiced by: Yōko Hikasa
Ryn Rakando (羅漢堂 凛, Rakandō Rin)
Voiced by: Chiwa Saitō
Toranojo Mikage (水影 虎之丞, Toranojo Mikake)
Voiced by: Keiji Fujiwara
Kumi Minakata (水潟 九美, Kumi Minakata)
Voiced by: Nana Mizuki
ES-07 (実験体07号, Jikken-tai 07-gō)
Voiced by: Rina Hidaka

==== Gunslinger Stratos 3 ====
Argo Odhner (アルゴー・オードナー, Arugō Ōdonā)
Voiced by: Tatsuhisa Suzuki
Kathy Odhner (キャシー・オードナー, Kyashī Ōdonā)
Voiced by: Natsumi Hioka
Ban Odhner (バン・オードナー, Ban Ōdonā)
Voiced by: Yū Kobayashi
Chloe Asuma (クロエ・アスマ, Kuroe Asuma)
Voiced by: Ayane Sakura
Chloe Akane (クロエ・アカネ, Kuroe Akane)
Voiced by: Maaya Uchida
Alex Thunderbolt (アレックス・サンダーボルト, Arekkusu Sandāboruto)
Voiced by: Norio Wakamoto
Tom C. Drescher (トム・C・ドレッシャー, Tomu C Doresshā)
Voiced by: Takahiro Sakurai

== Media ==
=== Anime ===
The opening theme is "Vanilla Sky" by Mashiro Ayano and the ending theme is "Mirai" by Garnidelia.

==== Episode list ====
| No. | Title | Original release date |
|---|---|---|
| 1 | "Open Hostilities: My Other Self" "Sentan mōhitori no boku" (戦端 もう一人の僕) | April 4, 2015 |
It is the year 2115. Tohru Kazasumi lives a boring school life in the 17th Far East Imperial City Management District. One morning, he awakens from a strange dream. The streets are filled with talk of the "Desert Syndrome", a mysterious phenomenon where humans crumble away like sand; but for Tohru, who is calm about any event, felt it had nothing to do with him. After school that day, while walking home with his classmate Kyoka Katagiri, he finds the mysterious girl from his dream at the side of the road. She suddenly runs off and Tohru rushes after her; but from that day, his life takes a drastic turn...
| 2 | "Resolve: An Ending World" "Kakugo owaru sekai "(覚悟 終わる世界) | April 11, 2015 |
The person who attacks Tohru and Kyoka in the world they fall into is "the other Tohru Kazasumi". Tohru cannot hide his uneasiness on the existence of an enemy with the same face as him; but with Kyoka's assistance and the help of Remy Odhner who rushes over, he escapes from harm and returns to his original world with a time-warp. When Tohru awakens from loss of consciousness due to shock from the warp, he finds himself in an unknown laboratory. Waiting for him there is the man in charge of the facility, who introduces himself Brian Odhner, and he proceeds to tell Tohru and Kyoka the truth about their world...
| 3 | "Sortie: Noble and Fleeting" "Shutsugeki kibishi to shite hakanaku" (出撃 凜として儚く) | April 18, 2015 |
Deciding to fight against himself from an alternate world in order to preserve the future, Tohru finally opens his case. The next day, on the way back from school, a luxury car pulls up right next to Tohru. The door opens to show Kyohma inside, and he claims to be heading over to the laboratory. Kyohma coaxes Tohru to get in and asks his intention of opening the case. Later, they arrive at the laboratory and head towards the training facility. Tohru changes into combat clothing and is about to head out to training when he bumps into someone unexpected along the way.
| 4 | "Confrontation: Those Who Defend Time" "Taiketsu-ji o mamoru mono" | April 25, 2015 |
Sidune falls to enemy fire. In the chaos of warfare, both sides decide to retreat. Back in the Management District, Tohru is shaken up seeing the reality of battle where friends get injured or even die, and traps himself in self-remorse. The Timekeepers contact the team once again, and the eligible must head into another battle. Meanwhile, Kyohma is worried about Tohru's depression, and takes action to question his determination.
| 5 | "Revelation: Two Histories" "Keiji futatsu no rekishi" (啓示 二つの歴史) | May 2, 2015 |
With the help from friends, both Tohrus arrive at the spot specified by the Timekeepers after a fierce battle. In the middle of a gunfight there, they suddenly receive notice to end combat. The door at the end of the passageway suddenly opens, and they find an unexpected individual awaiting them in a dimly lit room. While the two try to grasp the situation, the individual starts explaining the true reason why the two worlds "Frontier S" and "17th Far East Imperial Management District" must fight each other.
| 6 | "Castaway: The Other World" "Hyōryū mōhitotsu no sekai" (漂流 もう一つの世界) | May 9, 2015 |
The Timekeepers' power sends Tohru to an unfamiliar alley. Waking up to children's voices, he sees the Kyoka who fights for Frontier S. Tohru gathers from her story that he was sent to the 2115 in Frontier S. He is then led to the hidedout of Team Bastian that she is a part of. At the hideout, Kyoka informs Tohru about the harsh reality that the group in Frontier S must face.
| 7 | "Reuniting: A Bitter Dream" "Saikai nigai yume" (再会 苦い夢) | May 16, 2015 |
Remy chases the Frontier enemies with open anger after Kyoka was shot, and irradiates himself with the Energy Cube to drastically boost his powers. Remy manages to slowly corner the Frontier camp with his evolved powers, but his body suddenly starts Degradation and turns into a giant shapeless sandstorm that swallows Tohru whole. Completely trapped within the blowing sands, Tohru faces his own spiritual realm...
| 8 | "Battlefield: The Price of Bloodshed" "Senjō-ryū chinodaishō" (戦場 流血の代償) | May 23, 2015 |
Remy still wrecks havoc as a sandstorm, and indiscriminately assaults the eligible. Both sides are at their wits' end as they stood in the depths of despair in the face of such overwhelming power, when Tohru emerges from the sandstorm. Based on the critical information he relays, the two worlds decide on a cease-fire to first rid themselves of the Dead End. The two Tohrus exchange emotional blows in their strategy meeting...
| 9 | "Sudden Turn: The Price of Arrogance" "Kyūten gōman no mukui" (急転 傲慢の報い) | May 30, 2015 |
A giant Energy Cube appears in front of Tohru and company after rescuing Remy from the Dead End. As an awestruck Tohru watches it, Brian sends in an emergency communication and commences a coercive return. When Tohru awakens in the lab from the blackout caused by the return trip, Brian is there waiting for him. Suddenly, Brian tells the soldiers of the lab to restrain Tohru. While Tohru is captured without understanding the situation, Brian introduces him to a certain someone.
| 10 | "Counterattack: The Destination of Emotions" "Hangeki kimochi no yukue" (反撃 気持ちの行方) | June 6, 2015 |
Brian strategically locks Kyoka up inside the lab, but with help from Kumi and Lyudmila, Tohru rescues and is reunited with her. Olga makes a dashing appearance before them, right as they manage to escape from the lab. Olga drives them to her safehouse for shelter. There, Tohru and Kyoka find a moment's respite. Tohru falls asleep and dreams about the mysterious girl, by which he learns of the girl's past.
| 11 | "Showdown: At The End Of Time" "Kessen-ji no owari nite" (決戦 時の終りにて) | June 13, 2015 |
Faced with the final battle, both sides head into the battlefield once more to protect the futures of their worlds. In the 2015 Shibuya that has the giant Energy Cube, the fierce all-out war begins. However, compared to the aggressive Frontier S camp, the 17th camp led by Tohru are merely dodging the attacks – but this is because they have a certain plan. The 17th camp had realized that their enemies were not Frontier S but the Timekeepers, and in the face of death they start their negotiations for Frontier S to assist them in their plan.
| 12 | "ENCOUNTER / OUR FUTURE" | June 20, 2015 |
Cooperation between the two Tohrus allows them to defeat the Timekeepers, and the battle seemingly ends. However, Tohru from Frontier S declares that the battle is unfinished. Because the Frontier S Tohru cannot believe the eradication of the Timekeepers leads to true salvation for both futures, he challenges the 17th Tohru for one last battle to ensure their future is absolute regardless of cost. The 17th Tohru, with a determined look, accepts the challenge. The ultimate showdown begins, with the two futures at stake.
