= Ikazuchi =

Ikazuchi (雷 / いかずち / いかづち, "thunder"): may refer to:

== People ==
- Umegatani Tōtarō II, a sumo yokozuna, known by the elder name of Ikazuchi
- Kakizoe Tōru, sumo wrestler known by the elder name of Ikazuchi as of 2019

== Naval ships ==
- Ikazuchi-class destroyer, a class of six torpedo boat destroyers operated by the Imperial Japanese Navy (IJN) from 1899 to 1921
- Ikazuchi-class destroyer escort, a class of two destroyer escorts operated by the Japan Maritime Self-Defense Force from 1956 to 1977
- Japanese destroyer Ikazuchi, four destroyers of the Imperial Japanese Navy and the Japan Maritime Self-Defense Force

== In fiction ==
- Ikazuchi-class carrier, a fictional class of spaceships in the Robotech saga
- Den-Liner Ikazuchi, a dragon-style train used by the titular character of the Japanese tokusatsu series Kamen Rider Den-O
- Ikazuchi-Maru, a character in the 1966 ninja fantasy film The Magic Serpent
- Ikazuchi, the flagship of the Taraak Imperial Fleet in the Vandread anime series
- Ikazuchi, a character in the Japanese tokusatsu series Kamen Rider Zero-One
- Raimeiken Ikazuchi, the sword of Kamen Rider Espada, a character from the Japanese tokusatsu series Kamen Rider Saber

== See also ==
- Inazuma (disambiguation)
- Raiden (disambiguation)
- Thunder (disambiguation)
