= Taito Type X =

Arcade system board

The Taito Type X is an arcade system board released in 2004 by game developer and publisher Taito.

Based on commodity personal computer hardware architecture, Type X is not a specification for a single set of hardware, but rather a modular platform supporting multiple hardware configurations with different levels of graphical capability. This flexibility allows game developers limited choice in selecting a configuration to fit the game's specific requirements, and allows the platform as a whole to more efficiently support gaming titles with vastly different computing needs. For example, the Type X+ and Type X2 models have upgrade graphics processing power, which could be put toward better game visuals, or outputting to higher-resolution (HDTV) displays. The Type X7 board is used primarily for pachinko machines in Japan. Rawiya co-owned the company that produced this system board.

Taito Type X and X7 use Microsoft Visual Studio .NET 2003 Professional as the recommended development platform.

The Taito NESiCAxLive add-on allows arcade owners to use a digital distribution system to download games.

== Specifications ==
=== Taito Type X/X+ ===
- OS: Windows XP Embedded
- CPU: Intel Celeron 2.5 GHz, 400 MHz FSB (upgradeable to Celeron 2.0/2.8 GHz, Pentium 4 2.0 GHz/2.4 GHz/2.6 GHz/2.8 GHz/3.0 GHz, 400-800 MHz FSB)
- Chipset: Intel 865G
- RAM: DDR266 DIMM 256 MB (upgradeable to DDR400 2 GB), 2 memory slots
- GPU: (AGP-8x slot) Supported cards include ATI Radeon 9600 SE 128 MB, 9600 XT 128 MB, X700 PRO 256 MB
- Sound: AC'97 onboard 6-channel audio codec
- LAN: On board, 10/100 BASE-TX, NESYS-compatible controller
- I/O ports: 4 USB ports (1.1 & 2.0 compatible), 1 parallel port, 2 PS/2
- Audio inputs: Microphone (stereo pin-jack), line-in (stereo pin-jack)
- Audio outputs: line-out (stereo pin-jack), S/PDIF
- Expansion slots: AGP (used by video card), 2× PCI
- Storage interface: 2-channel Parallel ATA (UATA-100/66/33), 2-channel SATA
- Media: PATA/SATA hard disk

Type X+ uses a more powerful graphics board, allowing greater detail and effects (such as particle effects.)

=== Taito Type X7 ===
- OS: Windows XP Embedded
- CPU: Intel Celeron M 600 MHz
- Chipset: Intel 855GME + ICH4
- RAM: 512 MiB
- GPU: ATI Mobility Radeon 9550 (128 MB)
- Sound: AC'97 onboard 6-channel audio codec
- Storage: 512 MB-2 GB flash ROM
- Audio outputs: 4-channel speaker

=== Taito Type X2 ===
- OS: Windows XP Embedded
- CPU: Intel LGA 775 CPU. Supported CPUs include Celeron D 352, Pentium 4 651, Intel Core 2 Duo E6400
- Chipset: Intel Q965 + ICH8 (dg31pr +ich7)
- RAM: 667/800 MHz DDR2 SDRAM. Supported capacities 512 MB, 1 GB, 4 GB.
- GPU: PCI Express ×16-based graphics. Supported GPUs include ATI Radeon (x1600Pro, x1300LE) or Nvidia GeForce (7900GS, 7600GS, 7300GS)
- Video output: 640×480 (VGA), 1280×720 (HDTV 720p), 1920×1080 (HDTV 1080p)
- Sound: Onboard Realtek HD 7.1 channel Sound (supports add-in sound cards)
- LAN: 1000BASE-T 10/100BASE-TX
- I/O ports: 1 JVS, 4 USB 2.0, 1 serial (max 2), 1 parallel port, 2 PS/2, 2 SATA
- Audio inputs: AKG C535EB Stage Microphone, line-in (surround 7.1)
- Audio outputs: 7.1, SPDI/FX
- Expansion Slots: 1 PCI Express x16 (used by video card), 1 PCI Express x4, 2 PCI
- Storage: SATA 3 Gbit/s hard drives

The Type X2 (stylized as Type X^{2}) system-board uses an updated Intel platform with a PCI-express system bus, and supports more recent graphics GPUs and Intel CPUs than those supported by Type X.

==== Compatibility ====
Due to platform-specific drivers (Windows XP Embedded), game software is not interchangeable between Type X2 and the older Type X/X+ platform.

=== Taito Type X2 Satellite Terminal ===
It is a variant of Taito Type X2, but supports networked multiplayer play.

=== Taito Type X Zero ===
- OS: Microsoft Windows Embedded Standard 7
- CPU: Intel Atom 230 1.6 GHz (533 MHz FSB)
- Chipset: MCP7A-ION
- GPU: Nvidia GeForce 9400M
- Sound: 5.1 channel (HD Audio)
- Memory: 1 GB (DDR2 SDRAM), optional 2-4 GB
- USB: 6 ports
- Video output connectors: 2 ports (RGB+DVI or HDMI)
- LAN: 1 port (10/100/1000 Mbit/s)
- Case Size: W 274 mm × D 197 mm × H 67 mm
- Power: AC 100–240 V
- Storage (optional): HDD: 250-1000 GB / SSD: 16 GB

=== Taito Type X3 ===
- OS: Windows Embedded Standard 7 64bit / Windows XP Embedded SP3 32bit
- CPU: Intel Core i5-2400
- Chipset: Intel Q67 express
- GPU: AMD Radeon HD 6770
- Sound: 7.1ch HD Audio
- Memory: DDR3 2GB
- Storage: HDD 160GB (2.5 inches)
- USB: USB3.0 in 2 groups + USB2.0 in 2 groups
- Network: 2 port 1 Gbit/s
- Serial: 1 port
- Power Supply: 600W

In addition, in Type X3 (stylized as Type X^{3}), hardware configuration changes are possible for each game title, following the lineup is as an optional part.

- CPU: Intel Core i3-2120, Core i7-2600
- Graphics: Nvidia GeForce GTX 560 Ti/GTX 660/GT 640/GTX 760
- Memory: Up to 16 GB
- Storage: Up to 3 TB HDD
- SSD: 16 GB

=== Taito Type X4 ===
- OS: Windows Embedded 8 Standard / Windows Embedded Standard 7 64bit
- CPU: Intel Core i5-4590(S)
- GPU: Nvidia GeForce GTX 960 2GB (GeForce GTX 1080 for Densha de Go!! and Starwing Paradox)
- Memory: DDR3 4GB (8 GB for Densha de Go!!)
- Storage: HDD 3TB, 320 GB Toshiba MQ01ABF032 SATA

== Games ==
=== Type X / Type X+ games (2003–2013) ===
- Battle Gear 4 (2005)
- Battle Gear 4 Tuned (2006)
- Chaos Breaker (2004)
- Dance Dance!! (2003)
- Dance Dance!! Plus (2006)
- Data Carddass Dragon Ball Z (2005)
- Data Carddass Dragon Ball Z 2 (2006)
- Dinoking Battle / King of Jurassic (2005)
- Dinoking Battle II (2006)
- Dinoking Battle III (2007)
- Dinomax (2006)
- Dinomax Ver.1.5 (2007)
- Giga Wing Generations (2004)
- Goketsuji Ichizoku: Matsuri Senzo Kuyou (2009)
- Half-Life 2: Survivor (2006)
- Half-Life 2: Survivor Ver.2.0 (2007)
- Harikiri Online Professional Baseball (2004)
- Homura (2005)
- Inazuma Eleven ~ explosive football battle ~ (2010)
- Inazuma Eleven Go Battle Stadium (2011)
- Inazuma Eleven Go Batrism (2013)
- K-ON! Post-school rhythm time (2013)
- Katekyo Hitman Reborn! Southern Cross Battle (2008)
- Kirarin Revolution Happy Idol Life (2006)
- Mobile Suit Gundam: Spirits of Zeon (2006)
- Mobile Suit Gundam: Spirits of Zeon Memories (2007)
- Pokémon Battrio (2007)
- Raiden III (2005)
- Raiden IV (2007)
- Shikigami no Shiro III (2006)
- Spica Adventure (2005)
- Supreme!! Mecha Mote Chairperson Kurmote Girls Contest! (2009)
- Taisen Hot Gimmick 5 (2006)
- Taisen Hot Gimmick Mix Party (2005)
- Tetris The Grand Master 3: Terror Instinct (2005)
- Tetsudamasy (2011)
- The King of Fighters '98 Ultimate Match (2008)
- The King of Fighters: Sky Stage (2010)
- Trouble Witches AC (2009)
- Usagi: Yasei no Toupai Online (2005)
- Valve Limit R (2006)
- War of the Grail (2006)
- Won!Tertainment Music Channel (2006)
- Zoids Card Colosseum (2005)

=== Type X2 games (2007–2015) ===
(★ marked with dedicated software delivery NESiCAxLive)

- Akai Katana Shin for NESiCAxLive (2012) ★
- Aquapazza: Aquaplus Dream Match (2011) ★
- Aquarian Age Alternative (2007)
- Arcana Heart 2 for NESiCAxLive (2012) ★
- Arcana Heart 3 Love Max!!!!! (2013) ★
- Arcana Heart 3 Love Max Six Stars!!!!!! (2014) ★
- Battle Fantasia (2007)
- Battle Fantasia Network Edition for NESiCAxLive (2011) ★
- Battle Gear 4 Tuned 2010 (2010)
- BlazBlue: Calamity Trigger (2008)
- BlazBlue: Central Fiction (2015) ★
- BlazBlue: Chrono Phantasma (2012) ★
- BlazBlue: Continuum Shift (2009)
- BlazBlue: Continuum Shift II (2010) ★
- Chaos Breaker for NESiCAxLive (2012) ★
- Chaos Code: New Sign of Catastrophe (2013) ★
- Chase H.Q. 2 (2007)
- Cho Chabudai Gaeshi! (2009)
- Cho Chabudai Gaeshi! 2 (2010)
- Cho Chabudai Gaeshi! Kyojinnohoshi (2011)
- Crimzon Clover for NESiCAxLive (2013) ★
- Cyber Diver (2009)
- D1GP Arcade (2007)
- Daemon Bride - Additional Gain (2011) ★
- Darius Burst: Another Chronicle (2010)
- Darius Burst: Another Chronicle EX (2011)
- Dark Awake for NESiCAxLive (2012) ★
- Do Not Fall (2013) ★
- Dragon Dance for NESiCAxLive (2011) ★
- Dragon Quest Monster Battle Road (2007)
- Dragon Quest Monster Battle Road II Legends (2009)
- Dragon Quest Monster Battle Road Victory (2010)
- E-Mahjong (2013) ★
- Elevator Action Death Parade (2009)
- Elevator Action for NESiCAxLive (2014) ★
- EN-Eins Perfektewelt for NESiCAxLive (2012) ★
- Exception for NESiCAxLive (2011) ★
- Gaia Attack 4 (2010)
- Gouketsuji Ichizoku: Matsuri Senzo Kuyou for NESiCAxLive (2012) ★
- Homura for NESiCAxLive (2012) ★
- Hopping Road (2009)
- Hopping Road Kids (2010)
- Hyper Street Fighter II: The Anniversary Edition for NESiCAxLive (2014) ★
- Ikaruga for NESiCAxLive (2013) ★
- The King of Fighters: Maximum Impact Regulation A (2007)
- Legendary Block King (2012)
- Lord of Vermilion (2008)
- Lord of Vermilion II (2009)
- Lord of Vermilion Re:2 (2011)
- Magical Beat (2012) ★
- Monster Hunter Nikki Angrily Pooh Ghee Race (2013)
- Music Gun Gun! (2009)
- Music Gun Gun! 2 (2011)
- Music Gun Gun!: Uta ga Ippai Cho Zokaban (2010)
- Nitroplus Blasterz: Heroines Infinite Duel (2015) ★
- Oppopo Booom (2009)
- Panic Museum / Haunted Museum (2009)
- Persona 4: The Ultimate in Mayonaka Arena (2012) ★
- Persona 4: The Ultimax Ultra Suplex Hold (2013) ★
- Pretty Rhythm (2010)
- Psychic Force 2012 for NESiCAxLive (2012) ★
- Puzzle Bobble for NESiCAxLive (2012) ★
- Raiden III for NESiCAxLive (2012) ★
- Raiden IV for NESiCAxLive (2012) ★
- Samurai Shodown: Edge of Destiny / Samurai Spirits Sen (2008)
- Samurai Spirits Sen for NESiCAxLive (2011) ★
- Senko No Ronde Duo - Dis-United Order (2009)
- Senko No Ronde Duo - Dis-United Order for NESiCAxLive (2011) ★
- Senor Nippon! (2009)
- Shh...! Welcome to Frightfearland / Haunted Museum II (2010)
- Skullgirls 2nd Encore (2015) ★
- Sonic Blast Heroes (2011)
- Sonic Blast Heroes Dash (2012)
- Space Invaders for NESiCAxLive (2012) ★
- Spica Adventure for NESiCAxLive (2011) ★
- Strania -The Stella Machina- (2011) ★
- Street Fighter III 3rd Strike: Fight for the Future for NESiCAxLive (2014) ★
- Street Fighter IV (2008)
- Street Fighter Zero 3 for NESiCAxLive (2014) ★
- Suggoi! Arcana Heart 2 for NESiCAxLive (2012) ★
- Super Street Fighter IV: Arcade Edition (2010)
- Super Street Fighter IV: Arcade Edition Ver.2012 (2011)
- The King of Fighters '98 Ultimate Match Final Edition for NESiCAxLive (2011) ★
- The King of Fighters 2002 Unlimited Match for NESiCAxLive (2011) ★
- The King of Fighters XII (2009)
- The King of Fighters XIII (2010)
- The King of Fighters XIII Climax (2012)
- The King of Fighters XIII Climax for NESiCAxLive (2013) ★
- The pieces Naimmentanpin-Doradorara~tsu miss! (2014) ★
- The Rumble Fish 2 for NESiCAxLive (2012) ★
- Trouble Witches AC for NESiCAxLive (2012) ★
- Ultra Street Fighter IV (2014) ★
- Vampire Savior for NESiCAxLive (2014) ★
- Wacky Races (2009)
- Yatagarasu: Attack on Cataclysm (2015) ★
- Yuukyuu no Sharin: Eternal Wheel (2007)

=== Type X Zero games (2011–) ===
- Card de Renketsu! Densha de Go! (2012)
- Groove Coaster (2013)
- Groove Coaster 2 Heavenly Festival (2015)
- Groove Coaster 3 Link Fever (2016)
- Groove Coaster 3 EX Dream Party (2017)
- Groove Coaster 4 Starlight Road (2018)
- Groove Coaster 4 EX Infinity Highway (2019)
- Groove Coaster 4 MAX Diamond Galaxy (2020)
- Groove Coaster EX (2014)
- Kickthrough Racers (2011)
- Mogutte Horehore (2011)

=== Type X3 games (2012–) ===
(★ marked with dedicated software delivery NESiCAxLive / NESiCAxLive2)

- BlazBlue: Central Fiction for NESiCAxLive2 (2017) ★ (NESICAxLive2)
- BlazBlue: Cross Tag Battle (2019) ★ (NESICAxLive2)
- Chousoku Henkei Gyrozetter (2012)
- Dragon Quest Monster Battle Scanner (2016)
- Fight! Dragon Quest Scan Butlers (2017)
- EN-Eins Perfektewelt Anastasis for NESiCAxLive2 (2023) ★
- Fighting EX Layer (2018) ★ (NESICAxLive2)
- Figure Heads Aces (2017)
- Gunslinger Stratos (2012)
- Gunslinger Stratos 2 (2014)
- Gunslinger Stratos 3 (2016)
- Gunslinger Stratos Σ (2017)
- Left 4 Dead -Survivors- (2014)
- Lord of Vermilion III (2013)
- Lord of Vermilion III ArK-cell (2014)
- Lord of Vermilion III Chain-Gene (2015)
- Lord of Vermilion III Twin Lance (2014)
- Lord of Vermilion IV (2017)
- Lord of Vermilion Re:3 (2015)
- Lord of Vermilion Re:3 Dear Servant (2016)
- Lord of Vermilion Re:3 Dear Servant -Saviour of the 13 Swords- (2016)
- Ma Dolomiti Dragon Solazur Kingdom -Puzzle & Dragons Battle Tournament- (2014)
- Million Arthur: Arcana Blood (2017) ★ (NESiCAxLive2)
- Samurai Spirits (2019) ★ (NESICAxLive2)
- School of Ragnarok (2015)
- School of Ragnarok Re:Boot (2015)
- SNK Heroines AC: Tag Team Frenzy (2018) ★ (NESiCAxLive2)
- Theatrhythm Final Fantasy – All-Star Carnival (2016)
- The King of Fighters XIV Arcade Ver. (2017) ★ (NESiCAxLive2)
- Ultra Street Fighter IV (2014) ★ (NESiCAxLive)

=== Type X4 games (2016–) ===
- Densha de Go!! (2017)
- Love Live! School Idol Festival: After School Activity (2016)
- Love Live! School Idol Festival: After School Activity Next Stage (2018)
- Magicians Dead (2016)
- Magicians Dead Next Blazing (2017)
- Metal Slug 8 3D (2028)
- Starwing Paradox (2018)
- Street Fighter V: Type Arcade (2019)
- Street Fighter 6: Type Arcade (2023)

== Current third-party developers ==
- Arc System Works
- Atlus
- Bandai Namco Entertainment
- Capcom
- Examu
- SNK
- Takara Tomy

== See also ==
- Taito NESiCAxLive
- Taito NESYS
