= Raiden IV =

2007 video game

- North American cover art
- Developer: MOSS
- Publishers: MOSS: JP: MOSS; JP: Taito (Arcade); NA/EU: UFO Interactive; NA: MOSS (Xbox Live); WW: H2 Interactive (PC); WW: NIS America (2023)
- Series: Raiden
- Platforms: Arcade: Xbox 360; PlayStation 3; Windows; Nintendo Switch; PlayStation 4; PlayStation 5; Xbox One; Xbox Series X/S
- Release: June 7, 2007: Arcade; JP: June 7, 2007; JP: March 29, 2012 (NESiCAxLive); Xbox 360; JP: October 2, 2008; NA: September 9, 2009; Raiden IV: OverKill; PS3; JP: May 13, 2014; NA: April 29, 2014; EU: May 28, 2014; HKG: April 30, 2014; Windows; WW: September 3, 2015; Raiden IV x MIKADO remix; Switch; JP: April 22, 2021; NA: May 6, 2021; EU: October 22, 2021; PS4, PS5; JP: February 24, 2022; NA: January 31, 2023; EU: February 3, 2023; Windows, Xbox One, Xbox Series X/S; NA: January 31, 2023; EU/JP: February 3, 2023
- Genre: Scrolling shooter
- Modes: Single player, multiplayer
- Arcade system: Taito Type X, NESiCAxLive

Raiden IV (雷電IV, Raiden Fō) is a vertically scrolling shooter developed by MOSS and released as an arcade video game in Japan in 2007. A home conversion was published for Xbox 360 in 2008. An updated arcade version was later released for Taito's NESiCAxLive digital distribution platform. Two more versions with new content were released: Raiden IV: OverKill for PlayStation 3 and Windows, and Raiden IV x MIKADO remix for Nintendo Switch, PlayStation 4, PlayStation 5, Windows, Xbox One, and Xbox Series X/S.

== Gameplay ==
The gameplay of Raiden IV is similar to the previous games. In each stage of increasing difficulty, players maneuver their fighter craft, engaging various enemies and avoiding their attacks. The Flash Shot mechanic, first introduced in Raiden III, returns in this game. Collectible items include weapon upgrade icons, bombs to cancel enemy attacks and deal damage to enemies over a large area, and score items such as medals and fairies.

== Plot ==
The Crystals have returned again after numerous defeats against humanity. The VCD immediately launches a new model of the Raiden fighter, the Fighting Thunder ME-02 Kai, to stop the Crystals from taking over the Earth.

== Development ==
The first location test for Raiden IV was held at Akihabara Hey on July 22–23, 2006, on an Egret II system. This version had three difficulty levels and forced a different weapon for each player. The second location test was held again at Hey and at Taito Game World in Shinjuku on October 14–16. The third location test was held at High-Tech Sega in Shibuya and Taito Game World in Shinjuku on December 27. The version of the game used in this location test allowed players to select a weapon. The fourth and final location test was held at Shinjuku Gesen Mikado on February 20, 2007.

MOSS launched the arcade version of Raiden IV on June 7, 2007 along with an official website.

== Ports ==
In 2008, an Xbox 360 version was published with new stages, Xbox Live support, monitor rotation options, and downloadable content. The port was set to be released on September 11 by Moss, but was pushed back to October 2 as the game needed more polish and bug fixes.

A version designed for the NESiCAxLive arcade download system was unveiled on February 22, 2011, in AOU2011. New features include perfect mode, which incorporates the seven-stage game from the Xbox 360 version of Raiden IV, and background music from the Ultimate of Raiden soundtrack. It has the Fairy character available for use.

A PlayStation 3 version was released in early 2014 as Raiden IV: OverKill. This version was the first official European release of the game, and adds two new stages, three different fighters (Fighting Thunder ME-02 Kai, Fighting Thunder Mk-II, Fairy), a new OverKill Mode, and a Replay&Gallery Mode. It was then ported to Windows and released by H2 Interactive worldwide on September 3, 2015.

A version titled Raiden IV x MIKADO remix was released for Nintendo Switch on April 22, 2021 in Japan, on May 6, 2021 in North America, and October 22, 2021 in Europe. It features remixed background music by various artists produced by Game Center Mikado. It was later ported to PlayStation 4 and PlayStation 5 in Japan, and was released worldwide by NIS America for PlayStation 4, PlayStation 5, Xbox One and Xbox Series X/S in early 2023.

== Soundtrack ==
Raiden IV -Ultimate of Raiden- is a video game soundtrack CD by INH. It includes Arcade, Xbox 360, and remixed versions of game music tracks from older and current Raiden games, with a total of 27 tracks. The OST was included with the X360 version of game for a limited time. INH has also offered a special PDF file DVD by pre-ordering from their site. The disc named Raiden IV Secret File, contains player ship specifications, enemy combat data, strategies for the game and concept art. This Secret File is also available from American distributor UFO Interactive Games via a code printed on the American version of the CD.

== Reception ==
Reception

Aggregate scores
Aggregator	Score
GameRankings	66%
Metacritic	63%

Review scores
Publication	Score
1Up.com	7.5/10
IGN	6/10

Raiden IV has received mixed or average review scores upon its U.S. release, with both IGN and the Official Xbox Magazine scoring it a 6 out of 10. IGN's Eric Brudvig writes: "Though at first glance you might think there are 14 levels in Raiden IV ... there are in fact only seven with the second half of the game merely repeating the first.... UFO Interactive Games went ahead and added insult to injury with its use of downloadable content. After dishing out $40 for the game, you'll find that only one of the three ships on the main menu can be used. The other two must be purchased through Xbox Live". Backlash over the pay to play ships has created controversy at several gaming forums, leading gamers to wonder whether the extra content is worth the price to obtain them.
