= Inazuma =

Inazuma (電 / 稲妻 / いなずま / いなづま; "lightning"): may refer to:

- Suzuki Inazuma 250, a motorcycle
- Japanese destroyer Inazuma, four destroyers of the Imperial Japanese Navy and the Japan Maritime Self-Defense Force
- Lightning (1952 film), or Inazuma, a Japanese film by Mikio Naruse
- Inazuma, an Usagi Yojimbo character
- Inazuma Eleven, an association-football-themed media franchise
- Inazuma (Genshin Impact), a region in Genshin Impact

== People with the surname ==
- Inazuma Raigorō (1802–1877), Japanese sumo wrestler

== See also ==
- Azuma (disambiguation)
- Ikazuchi (disambiguation)
- Lightning (disambiguation)
- Raiden (disambiguation)
