= Gunslinger Stratos =

Video game series

- Genre: Third-person shooter
- Developers: Byking; Taito
- Publisher: Square Enix
- Platforms: Arcade, Windows
- First release: Gunslinger Stratos: JP: July 12, 2012
- Latest release: Gunslinger Stratos Σ: JP: April 24, 2017

Gunslinger Stratos (Note: Japanese: ガンスリンガー ストラトス, Hepburn: Gansuringā Sutoratosu) is a series of third-person hero shooter video games, developed by Byking and Taito, and published by Square Enix. It debuted in arcades on July 12, 2012, with the scenario provided by Norimitsu Kaihō (from Nitroplus) based on a concept by Gen Urobuchi. It uses Silicon Studio's Orochi game engine, and runs on the Taito Type X³ arcade system board.

Its sequel, Gunslinger Stratos 2 (Note: Japanese: ガンスリンガー ストラトス2, Hepburn: Gansuringā Sutoratosu 2), was released on February 20, 2014, featuring new characters, new battle mechanics, and new stages. Tetsuya Nomura and Akira Yasuda each created two characters exclusively for the game. A sequel, titled Gunslinger Stratos: Reloaded (Note: Japanese: ガンスリンガー ストラトス リローデッド, Hepburn: Gansuringā Sutoratosu Rirōdeddo), was announced to be released in 2016 for Windows PC. The servers were closed on March 29, 2016.

A fourth game, Gunslinger Stratos 3 (Note: Japanese: ガンスリンガー ストラトス3, Hepburn: Gansuringā Sutoratosu 3), was released on May 12, 2016. An upgraded version, Gunslinger Stratos Σ, with four character types and six new weapon packs for each character and several changes to the respawn and awake systems, was released on April 24, 2017.

The servers for the arcade version of Gunslinger Stratos were shut down on April 1, 2021.

An anime adaptation of the series, Gunslinger Stratos: The Animation, made its premiere on April 4, 2015.

== Gameplay ==
All of the games are played from a third-person perspective, and the player must move around the massive battleground (using the analog sticks and buttons on the two gun controllers), while using the Gun Controllers to aim and shoot at enemies. The goal is to survive and shoot down the rival teams to decrease the opposing team's team meter within a given time limit. The round ends when either teams' team meter drops to zero and/or if the timer reaches zero.

Players can switch weapons in-battle, utilizing various strategies and tactics, by melding the two gun controllers together into different positions, such as:

- Side Style: by clipping the side of the gun controllers together, the players can use their character's secondary arsenal.
- Tandem Style: by clipping the tip of right gun controller onto the top of the left gun controller, the players can use their character's powerful arsenal.

As the players progressed to the game's multiplayer mode, those who using the NESiCAxLive card can accumulate "Team Points" by winning battles, and using it to purchase and equip "Weapon Packs". Weapons Packs are a set of weapons that can be purchased and use in battle. Some of the packs has upgraded versions of the character's default weapons with boosted stats.

== Plot ==
=== Setting ===
In 2115, the country known formerly as Japan has been split into two parallel worlds: the Frontier S (Stratos) (Note: Japanese: フロンティアS（ストラトス）, Hepburn: Furontia S (sutoratosu)) and the 17th Far East Imperial City Management District (Note: Japanese: 第十七極東帝都管理区, Hepburn: Dai jū nana Kyokutō no teikoku kanri-ku). Frontier S is an outlaw universe in which freedom runs rampant, while the 17th Far East Imperial City Management District is a totalitarian universe completely bereft of freedom and is under constant surveillance. When the two universes are starting to fuse into one, the government of each worlds initiates the Operation Stratos (Note: Japanese: オペレーション・ストラトス, Hepburn: Operēshon sutoratosu), a world-scale protocol wherein a handpicked group of gunslingers, mercenaries, and special individuals, each from the two universes, will be sent to the year 2015 to alter the past by eliminating the other side until only one group survives, erasing a parallel universe in the process.

=== Story ===
The story revolves on a group of gunslingers, each from the two universes who participate in Operation Stratos, particularly on a group of four childhood friends: Tohru Kazasumi, Kyōka Katagiri, Kyōma Katagiri, and Shizune Rindo, who all must confront their own flaws and differences when they battle their alternate selves in order to survive.
