= Japanese destroyer Inazuma =

Four Japanese destroyers have been named Inazuma (電 / いなづま, "lightning"):

- Japanese destroyer Inazuma (1899), an Ikazuchi-class destroyer of the Imperial Japanese Navy during the Russo-Japanese War
- Japanese destroyer Inazuma (1932), an Akatsuki-class destroyer (1931) of the Imperial Japanese Navy during World War II
- JDS Inazuma (DE-203), an Ikazuchi-class destroyer escort of the Japan Maritime Self-Defense Force in 1956–1977
- JS Inazuma (DD-105), a Murasame-class destroyer (1994) of the Japan Maritime Self-Defense Force in 1999

== See also ==
- Inazuma
