= Emiko Iwasaki =

Japanese video game artist

- 岩崎恵美子
- Born: October 16, 1976 (age 49)
- Occupations: Illustrator; video game developer
- Years active: 1999-2016
- Notable work: Guilty Gear Petit; Battle Fantasia; Final Fantasy Brave Exvius

Emiko Iwasaki (岩崎恵美子, Iwasaki Emiko; born October 16, 1976) is a Japanese video game artist from Yokohama who has been active since 1999, mostly known for her work on Arc System Works's Guilty Gear series.

== Career ==
Initially joining the company as a part-time artist, she went on to work as a general director on four titles, one of the few women in the Japanese game industry to hold such a position. The last of these games, Battle Fantasia, was based on an original concept created by Iwasaki herself and was the developer's first fighting game with 3D models. With no prior experience, she and her team developed 2.5D techniques that influenced Street Fighter IV, as well as other Arc System Works games.

In 2011, she left Arc System Works and relocated to Singapore, holding leading positions in mobile game developer Gumi.

Although she found Arc System Works' CEO and the Guilty Gear team welcoming, Iwasaki claims to have faced gender discrimination during her time with the company, which made her interested in working in other countries. She has been vocal about the hurdles she sees facing women in the Japanese video game industry, sharing her experience at United Nations events and working as an ambassador for the Singapore Committee for UN Women programme Girls2Pioneers.

== Ludography ==
Year	Title	Platform(s)	Role
2001	Guilty Gear Petit	WonderSwan Color	General director, promotion illustration
2001	Guilty Gear Petit 2 (ギルティギア プチ２)	WonderSwan Color	General director, design, promotion illustration
2002	Guilty Gear X: Advance Edition	Game Boy Advance	Graphics
2002	Guilty Gear XX: The Midnight Carnival and updates	arcade, PlayStation 2, Windows, Xbox, PlayStation Portable, Xbox 360, Wii, PlayStation 3, PlayStation Vita, Nintendo Switch	Illustrator, character art, webmaster
2003	Naruto: Ninja Council (ＮＡＲＵＴＯ－ナルト- 忍術全開! 最強忍者 大結集)	Game Boy Advance	Art director
2003	Guilty Gear Isuka (鶍)	arcade, PlayStation 2, Windows, Xbox	Illustrator, character art
2004	Tokusou Sentai Dekaranger (特捜戦隊デカレンジャー)	Sega Pico	General director
2005	Ys IV: Mask of the Sun -A New Theory-	PlayStation 2, cell phones	Art director
2007	Battle Fantasia (バトルファンタジア)	arcade, PlayStation 3, Xbox 360, Windows	General director, original story plan, lead designer, planning, art and character design, voice of Marco Van de Land
2009	Diva Girls: Diva Dancers	Nintendo DS	Costume design, logo
2011	Hard Corps: Uprising	Xbox 360, PlayStation 3	Character and machine concept, character design, 3D-character design, effect design
2013	Puzzle Trooper	Android, iOS	Art director
2013	Brave Frontier	iOS, Android, Fire, Windows, Windows Phone	
2016	Final Fantasy Brave Exvius	iOS, Android, Fire	Creative director (art team, Gumi Asia Pte. Ltd.)
