= The King of Fighters '98 Ultimate Match =

2008 video game

- Japanese arcade flyer
- Developer: SNK Playmore
- Publisher: SNK Playmore
- Artist: Eisuke Ogura
- Series: The King of Fighters
- Platforms: Arcade; PlayStation 2; Xbox 360; PlayStation 4; Windows
- Release: March 18, 2008: Arcade; JP: March 18, 2008; CN: 2009 (UM Hero) PlayStation 2; JP: June 26, 2008; NA: March 3, 2009; EU: June 10, 2009 Xbox 360; WW: July 1, 2009 Final Edition Arcade; JP: January 24, 2011 Microsoft Windows; WW: December 16, 2014 PlayStation 4; WW: June 21, 2022
- Genre: Fighting
- Modes: Single-player, multiplayer
- Arcade system: Taito Type X PolyGame Master 2 (UM Hero); Taito Type X2 (Final Edition)

The King of Fighters '98: Ultimate Match is a 2008 Japanese fighting game developed and published by SNK Playmore. It is a remake of The King of Fighters '98, the fifth main game in The King of Fighters series. It was released for the Taito Type X arcade system.

Ultimate Match expands the number of playable characters from the original game by returning characters from the Orochi arc from previous installments, further tweaks the gameplay and features a third fighting style option as well as online functions. New artwork was made by new artist Eisuke Ogura. Several characters were given alternate forms based on previous incarnations they had in other SNK games.

Ultimate Match was ported to PlayStation 2 and Xbox 360 home systems. An updated version, subtitled Ultimate Match Final Edition, was released in 2011 on arcades and since ported to Windows and PlayStation 4. The game was generally well received for the amount of playable characters and new online functions especially in Final Edition. However, it was also criticized for being a chanllenging game that is also similar to the original Neo Geo game.

== Content ==
The King of Fighters '98 Ultimate Match is a 2D fighting game remake of the original The King of Fighters '98 where the player picks a team composed of three fighters to fight against the A.I. or other players. When fighting, the game originally had both Advance and Extra. A third fighting style is also introduced, dubbed "Ultimate" mode. Ultimate mode is a customizable style that allows the player to choose between features from Advance or Extra mode, such as which kind of Power Gauge to use. Several other modes not present in the original Neo Geo version were added too.

The game features a total of 64 characters. Ultimate Match includes additional characters not featured in the original version of the game, such as Eiji Kisaragi from KOF '95, along with Kasumi Todoh and the Boss Team (composed of Geese Howard, Wolfgang Krauser, and Mr. Big) from KOF '96, The original arcade mode from The King of Fighters '98 involved Shingo Yabuki from The King of Fighters '97 as a possible midboss and Omega Rugal from the The King of Fighters '95 as the final boss. The remake adds both Orochi Iori and Orochi Leona who from The King of Fighters '97 who can replace Shingo Yabuki as alternate midbosses who based on the player's performance. Additionally, Goenitz from The King of Fighters '96 and Orochi from The King of Fighters '97 appear as alternate final bosses replacing Omega Rugal based on the player's performance.

== Development ==
In developing the remake, SNK had a developer nicknamed "Dr. Neo Geo" be the main figure to interview players. In early test the arcade based on player's feedback with the most used characters were Kyo Kusanagi, Iori Yagami, Athena Asamiya, Kasumi Todoh and Geese Howard. Although they didn't make the top five, other new characters like Eiji Kisarage, Mr. Big, and Krauser—as well as the "alternate" versions of characters—also saw high usage. Ultimately, they confirmed that every single character was played during the location test. Given the limited time available at the location test, players seemed to focus on checking changes to their "main" characters and testing out the moves of the "new" characters. Dr. Neo Geo from SNK was interested in is how the "matchup chart" (which determines character strength) will evolve as we transition from the original '98 to "UM." Characters that seemed weak during the location test might actually possess hidden potential to rival top-tier fighters, while characters currently considered strong might reveal unexpected weaknesses. He was very excited to see how the matchup chart shifts through matches once the game officially launches. Dr. Neo Geo expressed his sincere gratitude to everyone who played the game and shared their feedback during this location test. He was deeply moved by the passion you all showed for KOF—and for the highly popular '98 title in particular.

In promoting the game, during its Tougeki debut in 2008, there were representatives from overseas regions such as China, Taiwan, Hong Kong, and South Korea. Krauser was among the most used characters in the competition. Besides its PlayStation 2 version, the standout feature of the Xbox Live Arcade version is has ability to play online against opponents worldwide. It is also the first SNK fighting game to feature an accurate representation of Saudi Arabia in one stage, as the country was a major market for the NEO GEO line in the early 1990s.

For OF '98 UM, they prepared several new stages in addition to those found in the original Neo Geo version such as the Hong Kong stage. Some had to be scrapped. Examples include the Taiwan stage, the Master of the Wangshi Yuan stage in China, and the Saudi Arabia camel caravan stage. Eiji and Kasumi were bsed on their KOF '95 and KOF '96 counterparts respectively but had their gameplay altered to balance the game. The Boss Team from The King of Fighters '96 composed of Geese, Mr. Big and Krauser were also included. King was given an alernate take in Ultimate Match since KOF heavily changed her movesets from the Art of Fighting series while Yamazaki was also given an alternate variation based on Real Bout Fatal Fury. While an alternate Blue Mary was also based on Real Bout Fatal Fury, the alternate Geese was simply called "Ura" despite having new moves. Some characters were like Benimaru, Antoher Terry, Andy, Ralf Jones, Kasumi and Krauser were also meant to be given new moves but were scrapped. SNK considered adding several "Alt" characters—such as an "Alt-Kim" based on the Real Bout Fatal Fury series and an "Alt-Mr. Big" with stats mirroring the Art of Fighting series.

== Release ==
KOF '98 was updated under a standalone title of The King of Fighters '98: Ultimate Match (KOF '98 UM) released in 2008, ten years after the original game's release. It was released in Japan as an arcade game for the Taito Type X hardware in March 2008. The PlayStation 2 version released on June 26, and was also published on the NeoGeo Online Collection The Best on June 18, 2008. The game was released in North America by Ignition Entertainment on March 3, 2009. It was released in Europe on June 10, 2009. An Xbox 360 version was released on July 1, 2009 via Xbox Live Arcade. A China-exclusive version for the PolyGame Master 2 arcade hardware was also released in 2009, which was called The King of Fighters '98: Ultimate Match Hero. A PlayStation 4 version of Ultimate Match was released on March 20, 2018.

It also includes a 'Neo Geo' mode, directly ported from the Neo Geo AES. An updated version titled The King of Fighters '98: Ultimate Match Final Edition, featuring balance changes for most characters, was released for arcades on January 24, 2011. It was released for Microsoft Windows on Steam on December 16, 2014, and on GOG.com on June 1, 2018. This version came to the PlayStation 4 on June 21, 2022.

== Reception ==
Reception

Aggregate score
Aggregator	Score
Metacritic	PS2: 73/100; X360: 73/100

Review scores
Publication	Score
1Up.com	B-
IGN	7.6/10
PC Mag	5/5
The Outer Heaven	3/5
The Mako Reactor	9/10
ImpulseGamer	3.6/5
TeamXbox	7.6/10
GameZone	7.1/10

The game has been well received based on Metacritic's scores for both the PlayStation 2 and Xbox 360 versions. Various publications for video games and other media have commented on Ultimate Match with IGN writer Ryan Clements giving it a 7.8, saying that probably this game should only be recommended to fans of The King of Fighters due to how old its graphics are as well as the little balance it has with 60 characters being playable. James Mielke from 1UP.com complained on how the game is very similar to KOF '98, but found the controls to be comfortable and intuitive for any fans of 2D fighting games. However, Heath Hooker from GameZone found that the gameplay and sound from the game make up for the graphics even though there is not much difference between KOF '98 and KOF '98: Ultimate Match. TeamXbox said that while the Ultimate Mode is appealing for its complexity, it is not useful for newcomers who fho might already have problems with mastering the original The King of Fighters '98. Nevertheless, he still praised the online capabilities provided in the remake.

In 2013, KOF '98 Ultimate Match was ranked as the 15th best arcade game of the 1990s by Complex, who also called it "possibly the greatest SNK fighting game of them all," and included it on their list of 25 best 2D fighting games of all time in 2013.

Final Edition was well received by PC Mag for its large content involving cast, balance, modes, character interactions, the new Ultimate mode but lamented the SNK did not use 3D visuals. The Mako Reactor said the wait for the port was worth as both PS4 and PC versions carry the large amount of characters and content they were previewed by developers. The game's online functions was also a subject of positive response, comparing it to Guilty Gear Strive. However, just liked PC Mag , the reviewer criticized the lack of 3D visuals and arranged soundtrack. Impulse Gamer acclaimed the PC port based on how well it was executed and the collaboration between SNK and Code Mystics into making an online mode. He believed the game would appeal to both retro and modern gamers. The Outer Heaven called it "the culmination of the Orochi Saga" for gathering all the characters present in such games SNK released before the original The King of Fighters '98 involving Kyo Kusanagi's and other characters' fight against the demon Orochi and its servants that served as bosses who are known for being difficult to defeat. The inclusion of Fatal Fury characters and other SNK IPs also helped to expand the content even if the game has no narrative. However, he heavily criticized the difficult in learning to master combos even if a practice mode is available to practise.

== Related games ==
A mobile RPG based on Ultimate Match, called The King of Fighters '98 Ultimate Match Online, was released by Chinese company Ourpalm for the iOS and Android platforms on July 9, 2016. In 2017, King of Fighters '98UM OL grossed ¥9.8 billion ($61.9 million) in Japan.
