= KOF: Sky Stage =

2010 video game

KOF Sky Stage
- Arcade flyer featuring Kyo Kusanagi
- Developer: SNK Playmore
- Publisher: SNK Playmore: JP: MOSS
- Platforms: Arcade, Xbox 360
- Release: JP: January 22, 2010; NA: September 15, 2010
- Genres: Vertical Scrolling shooter, run and gun
- Modes: Single-player, multiplayer

KOF Sky Stage is an arcade shooting game based on SNK's franchise The King of Fighters series. It was released in Japanese arcades January 22, 2010 and ported to the Xbox 360 on September 15, 2010. This installment and The King of Fighters 2002: Unlimited Match were delayed by SNK due rating issues. The game has spawned a spiritual sequel titled Neo Geo Heroes: Ultimate Shooting.

== Gameplay ==
Players can choose to rotate action on the screen horizontally or vertically based on their preferences. A normal story in Story Mode consists of fifteen stages. The player can select Kyo Kusanagi, Iori Yagami, Kula Diamond, Mai Shiranui, Terry Bogard and Athena Asamiya. Among the bosses the player can fight alternative versions of Athena and Kula Diamond, Kusanagi, Orochi Iori, Goenitz, Rugal Bernstein, Orochi Chris, Orochi Yashiro, Orochi Shermie and Orochi. Each character possesses their own special moves from the fighting game series but adapted to the shooting system. The Xbox Live Arcade version also allows the player to play against and cooperate with the same characters. By supporting Xbox Live, the players can play against and cooperate with players not only in Japan but all over the world.

== Plot ==
In order to rescue fighters trapped in Orochi's dimensional prison, several fighters are given the ability to fly by Chizuru Kagura and use their abilities to shoot down various demons and wraiths opposing them.

== Development ==
SNK Playmore has announced that their new arcade title would be available on Winter 2009. The company has announced that the game will have a unique system that combines the unique systems of shooting games and fighting games. The company also announced that KOF Sky Stage would be exhibited at the 47th Amusement Machine Show, an arcade game event to be held at Makuhari Messe in Chiba. On the day of the event, a playable version of the game will be exhibited at the Taito booth.

== Reception ==
Eurogamer scored the game a 6 out of 10, finding the game too simplistic despite enjoying the combo system which attracted the reviewer the more he played it. The game inspired a sequel titled Neo Geo Heroes: Ultimate Shooting.
