= Raiden Fighters 2 =

1997 video game

Raiden Fighters 2: Operation Hell Dive
- Developer: Seibu Kaihatsu
- Publishers: Fabtek (US); The Metrotainment Network (Asia); Tuning Electronic (DE); DotEmu (PC)
- Series: Raiden
- Platforms: Arcade, Microsoft Windows
- Release: Arcade; 1997; Microsoft Windows; May 16, 2013
- Genre: Vertical scrolling shooter
- Modes: Single-player, multiplayer
- Arcade system: Seibu SPI System

Raiden Fighters 2: Operation Hell Dive (ライデンファイターズ2, Raiden Faitāzu Tsū) is a 1997 vertical-scrolling shooter arcade game developed and published by Seibu Kaihatsu. It is the direct sequel to Raiden Fighters, which is a spin-off of the Raiden scrolling shooter video game franchise. This game shares the same game mechanics as its predecessor while expanding on the concepts that defined it. It is followed by Raiden Fighters Jet, the third game in the series.

== Gameplay ==
Raiden Fighters 2 has simplistic controls typical of shoot 'em up games. A Fire button shoots the player's weapons. A Bomb button releases a special attack that damages enemies and cancels out enemy fire over a large area.

A new feature introduced in Raiden Fighters 2 is the Hybrid Attack, available only during a two-player game. When two players are close to each other and use their charged attacks, the Hybrid attack is activated, rendering both players invincible for the duration of the attack.

Medals appear more frequently than in the first game, giving players increased scoring opportunities.

=== Stages ===
There are a total of seven stages, divided into three missions. Stage environments include swamps, beaches, and a raid against enemy bombers. Each of the first two missions ends in a long boss encounter. The first two stages in these missions are randomly ordered. The final Mission pits the player against an attack base and an experimental attack aircraft as bosses.

=== Fighter craft ===
This game includes seven aircraft, which are retooled versions of the Raiden Fighters craft. Some craft had their secondary weapons switched around, while others had theirs revamped. The rest are new to this game, complete with new weaponry.

The secret fighters in this game are unlocked the longer the arcade machine has been running since initial boot-up. Newer single-PCB versions of the game eliminate the time-based unlocking mechanic and make all the fighters available from the start. Unlockable fighters include the Miclus and Fairy (both collectible score items in the Raiden and Raiden Fighters series). Introduced in this game are the second-player colored variation of the Raiden mk-II and Judge Spear, dubbed the Raiden mk-IIβ and Blue Javelin respectively, each with different weaponry and attributes than their counterparts.

All but two of the hidden craft in this game reappear in the sequel Raiden Fighters Jet.

=== Plot ===
Raiden Fighters 2 takes place four years after the events of the first game. A few surviving guerrilla groups gather under a dictator. They form a new nation and begin attacks on the protagonists. In response, retooled fighters were deployed in a new mission called Operation Hell Dive.

== Music ==
The music of Raiden Fighters 2 is composed in the techno style with some instances of drum and bass (the theme of the boss stages). The soundtrack was composed by Go Sato. His past works include the soundtracks of Raiden II, parts of Raiden DX, Viper Phase 1, Battle Balls, and the first Raiden Fighters.

== Other versions ==
The later Raiden Fighters 2 - 2000 Operation Hell Dive clone runs on cheaper hardware and features notoriously inferior sound than the original.

A newer single-board version was released for the US market. This stand-alone version has all fighters available immediately.

In Japan, Game Machine listed Raiden Fighters 2 on their February 1, 1998 issue as being the eleventh most-successful arcade game of the month.
