= The King of Fighters '98 Ultimate Match Online =

2016 video game

The King of Fighters '98: Ultimate Match Online
- The game's title screen
- Developers: PlayHit, Playcrab, Finger Fun
- Publisher: SNK
- Platforms: Android, iOS
- Release: May 5, 2016
- Genre: Tactic role-playing
- Mode: Single-player

The King of Fighters '98: Ultimate Match Online (拳皇'98：終極之戰OL), briefly referred to as KOF'98 UM OL, is an officially authorized SNK mobile game by PlayHit, Playcrab and Finger Fun. It is a free-to-play, tactical RPG fighting mobile game based on the fighting game The King of Fighters '98 Ultimate Match. A mobile RPG based on Ultimate Match, released by Chinese company Ourpalm for the iOS and Android platforms on May 5, 2016.

== Premise ==
The game starts with the climax from The King of Fighters '97 where the New Faces Team, Yashiro, Shermie and Chris seek to revive the demon Orochi while fighting Kyo Kusanagi, Iori Yagami and Chizuru Kagura, among other fighters. Throughout the fight, Chris becomes the vessel of Orochi and takes down the fighters. However, Kyo and Iori manage to team up together to defeat Orochi and have it sealed. With the conflict reaching its ending, Kyo alone starts travelling around the world where he recruits Yuri Sakazaki and Athena Asamiya as they meet Geese Howard's soldiers Billy Kane and Ryuji Yamazaki who plot to revive Orochi. Kyo decides to fight against the demon again and the player has him recruit a team to participate in the next KOF tournament and protect the peace.

== Gameplay ==
Example of Online gameplay showing the player's fighters on the left.

This work is a tactic action RPG based on the popular fighting game The King of Fighters series. Battles are simple command-based, with up to 6 characters organized and challenged, and basically players do is tap and swipe. In addition to normal attacks, the character will fight strong enemies using special moves that can be activated by swiping the character's icon. When attacking, rings appear like in a rhythm game, and by tapping them at the right time, combos are connected. If players tap at the best timing, "Perfect" will be displayed and the character next to the will attack. Rings will also appear, and by tapping in the same way, combos will be connected at a good tempo, and allied characters will attack one after another.

Players can enjoy the familiar special moves and voices in this work, so organize their preferred characters and defeat enemies with special moves. There are plenty of elements to keep the player going, including training, and the system allows them to make their favorite characters as strong as possible. In addition to standard elements such as leveling up and ranking up, the player can power up with a variety of training elements, so they can train your favorite characters to be the strongest. In addition to story quests, there are also plenty of content to keep the player going solo and compete for rank, as well as PvP content. In "Space Battle", one season lasts one month, and players compete for rankings based on the clear points they get in special stages.

== Development ==
The game was released by FingerFun Limited for Android 5.0 on June 28, 2019. Besides featuring SNK characters, Online made collaborations with other franchises such as Guilty Gear, Goblin Slayer or Senran Kagura.

== Reception ==
The game got 50 million downloads worldwide. In 2017, King of Fighters '98UM OL grossed ¥9.8 billion ($61.9 million) in Japan.

TouchArcade praised the accessible yet simplistic mechanics the game uses. However, he found the tutorial troubling due to its amount of content the player has to write down. In the end, he still found it as an enjoyable KOF game.
