= Japanese destroyer Ikazuchi =

Four Japanese destroyers have been named Ikazuchi (雷 / いかづち, "thunder"):

- Japanese destroyer Ikazuchi (1898), lead ship of the Ikazuchi-class destroyer, a class of six destroyers of the Imperial Japanese Navy during the Russo-Japanese War.
- Japanese destroyer Ikazuchi (1931), an Akatsuki-class destroyer (1931) of the Imperial Japanese Navy during World War II.
- JDS Ikazuchi (DE-202), lead ship of the Ikazuchi-class destroyer escort, a class of two destroyer escorts of the Japan Maritime Self-Defense Force in 1956–1977.
- JS Ikazuchi (DD-107), a Murasame-class destroyer (1994) of the Japan Maritime Self-Defense Force in 1999.

== See also ==
- Ikazuchi (disambiguation)
