= Battle Fantasia =

2007 video game

- European cover
- Developer: Arc System Works
- Publishers: JP: Arc System Works; NA: Aksys Games; EU: 505 Games; AU: Aksys Games; WW: Arc System Works (PC)
- Director: Emiko Iwasaki
- Producer: Kōki Sadamori
- Designers: Emiko Iwasaki; Takuro Kayumi; Seishi Hukumoto; Yasuhiro Tashima
- Programmer: Takuro Kayumi
- Artists: Emiko Iwasaki; Kazunori Taguchi
- Writer: Emiko Iwasaki
- Composer: Kennosuke Suemura
- Platforms: Arcade, Microsoft Windows, PlayStation 3, Xbox 360
- Release: Arcade: JP: April 26, 2007; Xbox 360 & PlayStation 3: JP: May 29, 2008; NA: September 16, 2008 (X360); EU: March 6, 2009; AU: 2009; PlayStation Network: NA: December 22, 2009; JP: July 15, 2010; Microsoft Windows; July 7, 2015
- Genre: Fighting
- Modes: Single-player, multiplayer
- Arcade system: Taito Type X^{2}

Battle Fantasia (バトルファンタジア, Batoru Fantajia) is a fighting video game developed by Arc System Works. Originally released in Japanese arcades in April 2007, the title was ported to the Xbox 360 and PlayStation 3 in Japan in May 2008, followed by a North American release for Xbox 360 in September 2008 by Aksys Games. It was later released in the PAL region in 2009 for both systems by 505 Games (Europe) and Aksys Games (Australia). A PC version, ported in collaboration with DotEmu and distributed via Steam, was released on July 7, 2015 globally as Battle Fantasia: Revised Edition. The game's development was headed by Emiko Iwasaki, who had previously served as illustrator for the company's Guilty Gear series, and features three-dimensional character models restricted to a two-dimensional plane. Battle Fantasia retains a number of features of its predecessor including fast-paced gameplay, colorful anime-style graphics, and over-the-top effects, yet was designed to be a more basic representation of the fighting genre.

The game is notable for its stylistic departure from many fighting games, and is set in a fantasy world depicted as a storybook, and borrows many superficial elements from role-playing games including damage represented as numbers and a text-heavy story mode, which involves a number of heroes answering the call to battle to stop an evil force from once again attempting to destroy the world. Battle Fantasia met with relatively low sales in Japan and received mixed or average reviews from critics.

== Gameplay ==
A fight between Urs and Watson showcasing the game's fantasy art style.

Battle Fantasia is a traditional versus fighting game where up to two players compete against each other in combat using a variety of characters each with their own special attacks and fighting styles. While the game uses three-dimensional graphics for characters, they are restricted to a two-dimensional battle area that only allows them to move back and forth or up into the air. Players face each other in best-of-three round battles that involve the use of normal attacks, throws, and special moves that often involve combinations of button presses and directional input, which can be strung together in long combo strings. The game features four main attack buttons - two punches and two kicks - as well as a fifth "Gachi" (ガチ lit. "elegance" or "grace") button used to parry incoming attacks. If a player times a Gachi command just as an opponent's attack lands, it negates all damage and allows the player to counterattack in a brief time frame. The button can also be used to push an opponent back when combined with a direction, as well as allow the player to recover faster from a knock-down.

As players deal and receive damage, they add to their MP Gauge located at the bottom of the screen, which can be stocked to a maximum of three levels. Players can expend MP to activate "Heat Up" mode to increase their strength and add additional effects to their attacks, with specific enhancements differing with each character. The gauge also allows characters to unleash powerful super moves which cause heavy damage but require spending one gauge level to activate, and can be strung together with special moves with proper timing resulting in a Super Cancel combination. Matches are won either when a player depletes their opponent's health bar, or when the time limit of each round runs out, resulting in a win for the player with the most remaining vitality. The amount of health is different for each character, and is represented by numerical hit points under each health bar.

== Characters ==
- Urs Van de Land
- Marco Van de Land
- Olivia Von Roselia
- Ashley Loveless
- Cedric Ward
- Watson Livingston
- Coyori
- Freed Velez
- Face
- Donvalve Du Don
- Deathbringer
- Odile & Dokurod

== Development ==
=== Arcade version ===
In Japan, 2D fighting video game wanted to shift 3D graphics with 2D gameplay experience, but it was thought to have been technologically impossible for over 10 years since Street Fighter EX released. Battle Fantasia, released in 2007 was modern innovation in 2.5D style fighting games. Battle Fantasia was developed by Arc System Works originally as a Japanese arcade game beginning in 2006. The company had previously been known for their work on the popular Guilty Gear fighting game series and was looking for ways to expand their market to a more general audience, and appointed character illustrator Emiko Iwasaki as the project's director, one of only a few women to rise to that position in the Japanese game industry. The game was the company's first title developed for the Taito Type X² arcade board hardware, and was the first game to use Taito's Vewlix arcade cabinet, which allowed the game to run in high-definition 720p resolutions. Although Iwasaki was given a large degree of freedom when making the game, she was encouraged by the company to retain many features from the Guilty Gear franchise in order to maintain their core audience, as well as being told that the game "needed" to use three-dimensional graphics in order to develop the company's 3D talent, as well as more efficiently utilize the Type X² hardware. Stylistically, the game was a departure from Arc System Works' earlier games, with Battle Fantasia's colorful fantasy art direction chosen due to the popularity of role-playing games in Japan, which was overseen by graphic designer Junya Motomura. Gameplay was also made simpler when compared to other games in the genre in an attempt to bring more people into fighting games, as well expand it to the female demographic. Early beta versions of Battle Fantasia began public location tests in select arcades across Japan in October 2006, with further tests conducted over the next few months until the game's official release in April 2007.

=== Console ports ===
A home console version of Battle Fantasia was announced in a February 2008 issue of Japanese Weekly Famitsu magazine, and was confirmed for release for both the PlayStation 3 and Xbox 360 systems. The console releases would feature a number of new play modes, including a new, single-player story mode unique to each character, and online play over Sony's PlayStation Network and Microsoft's Xbox Live. In order to make the game more competitive, tweaks and balance changes were enacted to the game's roster, and exploits such as infinite combos were removed entirely. On May 1, a playable demo version of the game was released for the Japanese PlayStation Network, with a full commercial release for both consoles on May 29.

In a July 2008 press panel, Aksys Games announced that it would be bringing Battle Fantasia to North America the following September, but only for the Xbox 360. When asked about the possibility of a PlayStation 3 version, a representative remarked that "We're looking into it, but right now it's just 360." In an interview with website Gamasutra, when asked if a North American PlayStation 3 version was rejected by Sony Computer Entertainment America, Arc System Works producer Kouki Sadamori merely replied that the question was "a tough one to answer..." 505 Games signed on as the game's European publisher, who released both the Xbox 360 and PlayStation 3 versions in the region simultaneously in March 2009. Battle Fantasia's late release in the region was attributed to the subject of incest being discussed during certain character's Story Mode cutscenes, which prompted the publisher to remove many alternative story paths from the game mode. The game saw a very limited release in only a few selected countries, and was originally intended to be a GBP£25 budget title, but rose to £40 after the game became exclusive to European game retailer GAME. One year after the announcement that the game would only come to North America for the Xbox 360, Aksys Games announced that it would be releasing Battle Fantasia as a full download title on the PlayStation Network in Fall 2009, with project lead Frank deWindt stating that "The fans have been asking for it and we're here to deliver." In addition to the announcement, the company also held a contest on their official website for fans to name five new PlayStation Network achievement trophies added especially for the new release, which was made available on Sony's PlayStation Store on December 22, 2009.

=== PC Port ===
A new version of the game, called the "Battle Fantasia Revised Edition", was released on PC via Steam on July 7, 2015. This definitive edition features an updated game balance and improved visual effects over the console versions. Revised Edition on PC also includes original soundtrack for free.

== Reception ==
Reception

Aggregate score
| Aggregator | Score | | |
| Aggregator | PC | PS3 | Xbox 360 |
|---|---|---|---|
| Metacritic | 58/100 | 67/100 | 71/100 |

Review scores
| Publication | Score | | |
| Publication | PC | PS3 | Xbox 360 |
|---|---|---|---|
| 1Up.com | N/A | N/A | B− |
| Edge | N/A | N/A | 7/10 |
| Eurogamer | N/A | N/A | 7/10 |
| Famitsu | N/A | 25/40 | (X360) 29/40; 25/40 |
| Game Informer | N/A | N/A | 7.5/10 |
| IGN | N/A | N/A | 6.5/10 |
| PlayStation Official Magazine – UK | N/A | 7/10 | N/A |
| Official Xbox Magazine (US) | N/A | N/A | 6.5/10 |
| TeamXbox | N/A | N/A | 7.6/10 |
| VideoGamer.com | N/A | 6/10 | 6/10 |

The home console versions of Battle Fantasia received relatively low sales in Japan, with the PlayStation 3 and Xbox 360 versions selling 3,100 and 2,300 copies respectively during their debut week. Famitsu also gave both console versions 25 out of 40, while Famitsu Xbox360 gave the Xbox 360 version 29 out of 40.

Western response to Battle Fantasia was mostly average, with the game receiving "mixed or average reviews" on all platforms according to the review aggregator website Metacritic. Many critics compared the title to Arc System Works' previous fighting game endeavor, the Guilty Gear series, with 1UP.com declaring that the game was more simplistic than the company's earlier works with less focus on technical aspects such as combos, and that each characters special moves were "flashy and not as situational". The website felt that many of the changes resulted in the characters being more interesting, and called the game's fantasy art motif "a pleasing sidestep" from Guilty Gear's more "edgy" style, but found that most matches were slow and that the colorful art direction and Japanese voices would only appeal to a niche audience. Game Informer declared that the presentation of Battle Fantasia was charming "with all the vibrancy and artistic style of an anime", yet it did little to revolutionize the genre despite adding traditional role-playing game aesthetics such as "long-winded story segments". IGN called the game's character design "lighthearted and appealing", but that the total cast size of only twelve playable characters was relatively small compared to other fighting games, and that background designs were "oftentimes bland and ugly". In regards to the game's technical aspects, IGN felt the game lacking when compared to more high-profile titles such as Sega's Virtua Fighter 5, and that gameplay was more about "timing and calculated moves than massive combos or memorizing deep move sets". Anime News Network ranked it fourth on their list of video games that "deserved far more attention than they received", saying what "sets it apart is the look" of the backgrounds and characters.

European versions of Battle Fantasia in early 2009 were often compared to Capcom's highly anticipated Street Fighter IV released just one month after. Eurogamer claimed that the game was "not even in the same league as Capcom's superlative re-envisioning", yet compared its defensive Gachi parrying system to Street Fighter III. The website would criticize the title's "by-the-numbers gameplay" and lack of online competition, and called Battle Fantasia's art style "a nice departure, but many will find the overly twee presentation a bit too sugary for their fighter tastes." Play UK also commented on the game's release, stating that "Six months ago we would have happily recommended it as a stopgap to Street Fighter IV, but we just can't say that now." Journalists for the magazine would pan the title's lack of gameplay options and called the story mode "a joke." Ironically, though it was often found to be inferior to Street Fighter IV, series director Yoshinori Ono cited the original arcade version of Battle Fantasia in 2007 as the inspiration for his game's new three-dimensional art style, stating "Our fear was that with Street Fighter IV, because our characters are taller and more human-proportioned that it might look funky... What we learned through development was that no, it's not going to look weird... Battle Fantasia was part of what made us realize that, I think."
