= Raiden (series) =

Scrolling shooter video games

- Genre: Vertical-scrolling shooter
- Developers: Seibu Kaihatsu; MOSS
- Publishers: Seibu Kaihatsu; MOSS; UFO Interactive Games
- Platforms: Arcade, Atari Falcon, Atari Jaguar, Atari Lynx, MS-DOS, PC Engine, PlayStation, Mobile phone, Microsoft Windows, PlayStation 2, PlayStation 3, PlayStation 4, PlayStation 5, Xbox 360, Xbox One, Xbox Series X/S
- First release: Raiden; April 1990
- Latest release: Raiden IV X MIKADO remix May 6th 2021
- Spin-offs: Raiden Fighters; Viper Phase 1

Raiden (Note: Japanese: 雷電, Hepburn: Raiden) is a series of arcade games by Seibu Kaihatsu initially available in arcades in Japan and later distributed to other countries by Fabtek and other arcade game manufacturers.

The game that began the franchise was Raiden. It was ported for the PlayStation as The Raiden Project. In the 1990s, it was ported to various home computers and game consoles of the time. Later ports were released on mobile phones.

Seibu Kaihatsu developed the Raiden games and its related spin-offs from 1990 until 1998. The license of Raiden was later purchased by MOSS in 2005. Raiden III and Raiden IV have been developed on various Taito boards (Taito Type X series), while Raiden V is the first game in the series to be released first on a home console (the Xbox One) and never have an arcade release. A Raiden Fighters Remix collection is confirmed and currently under development.

== Overview ==
In each installment, there is a threat to humanity posed by the invasion of Earth by an alien lifeform known as the Crystals. In the wake of the Crystal proliferation, the world joined to form the VCD, which must launch a counter-attack with their powerful weapon based on Crystal technology, the Fighting Thunder attack craft, for the future of humanity. In most of the Raiden games, the Crystals are represented by a large red crystal that forms the core of the games' bosses and is the final boss. The first two Raiden installments had eight stages. Raiden III consists of seven stages while Raiden IV has five. Raiden V introduces branching stage paths that depend on player performance.

Later games introduced new features, such as the ability for one player to control both player ships at the same time. Starting in Raiden III, the "flash shot" scoring mechanic allows players to get high scores by quickly destroying enemies as they appear. A slightly different version of this scoring mechanic was introduced in the Raiden Fighters spin-off.

== Games released ==
=== Main series ===
The first three Raiden games were published by Seibu Kaihatsu and distributed by Fabtek (US), The Metrotainment Network (Asia), and Tuning Electronic (Germany). After more than a decade, the original series was revived and licensed by MOSS and published by Taito.

- Raiden (1990)
- Raiden II (1993)
- Raiden DX (1994)
- Raiden III (2005)
- Raiden IV (2007)
- Raiden V (2016)

=== Spin-offs ===
Viper Phase 1, released in May 1995, has an exhaustible secondary weapon system (indicated by a bar meter). An updated version of Viper Phase 1, released three months later, modified the weapons system to be similar to the Raiden games.

The Raiden Fighters games became associated with the Raiden series. The first Raiden Fighters game was originally a completely unrelated game with the name Gun Dogs during development. Seibu Kaihatsu changed its name to Raiden Fighters just before release because the game drew more income with the "Raiden" name.

- Viper Phase 1 (1995)
- Raiden Fighters (1996)
- Raiden Fighters 2 (1997)
- Raiden Fighters Jet (1998)
- Raiden NOVA (2024)

=== Compilations ===
Compilation rereleases include games from the main Raiden series and its spin-offs.

- The Raiden Project (1995)
- Raiden Fighters Aces (2008)
- Raiden Legacy (2015)
- Raiden Fighters Remix Collection (2026)
