= Raiden Shin'emon =

Japanese sumo wrestler

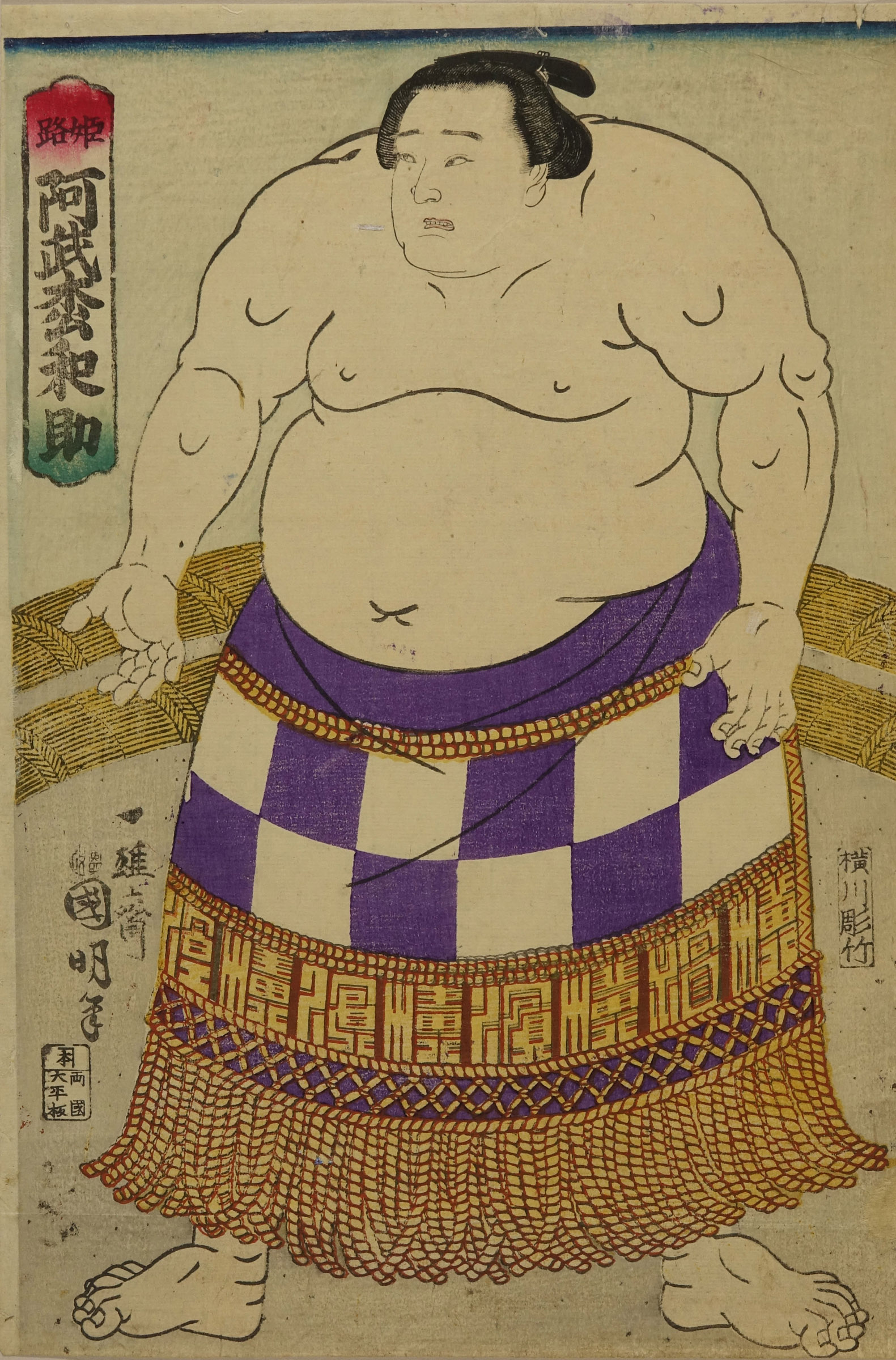

Personal information
- Native name: 雷電 震右エ門
- Born: Wasuke Kazuyoshi; 1842 Hakui, Ishikawa Prefecture, Japan
- Died: June 7, 1886 (aged 43–44)
- Height: 1.77 m (5 ft 9 1/2 in)
- Weight: 125 kg (276 lb)

Sport
- Sport: Sumo
- Retired: May, 1881
- Heya: Ōnomatsu → Chiganoura
- Record: 116-25-96-15 draws/5 holds
- Debut: April, 1864
- Highest rank: Ōzeki (January, 1877)
- Elder name: Ōnomatsu
- Championships: 5 (Makuuchi, unofficial)
- Updated on August, 2023

Raiden Shin'emon (雷電 震右エ門; 1842 – June 7, 1886) was a Japanese professional sumo wrestler from Hakui, Ishikawa Prefecture. He made his debut in April 1864 and wrestled for Chiganoura stable. He reached the makuuchi division in April 1870 and reached the rank of ōzeki in 1877. He was nicknamed "Noto's Raiden" (能登雷電) since he is the last wrestler to use the Raiden shikona, or ring name. He retired in May, 1881 and died in 1886.

== Early background and career ==
Raiden real name was Wasuke Kazuyoshi (和吉 和助) but later changed it to Wasuke Kusunoki (楠 和助). He was born in 1842 as the fourth son of a peasant farmer in the town of Motoe, Hakui District in Noto Province (now simply Hakui, Ishikawa). He began to work at a sake shop but the owner recommended him to become a professional wrestler (rikishi). He went to Edo and was scouted by the master of Ōnomatsu stable of the time (Shokichi Matsugae), and changed his name there. At a certain point in his career, however, he changed stables to join Chiganoura stable.

He stepped in the ring for the first time in the first year of the Genji era (1864). Initially wrestling under his real name, he took the shikona, or ring name, Kabutoyama (兜山) in 1868. He was so highly regarded for his skills that he was sponsored by the Himeji Domain. Between 1872 and 1874, he led a period of domination over official tournaments. Between 1870 and 1872, he had lost only six matches, but improved further by not being defeated with 34 wins and no losses. Between 1871 and 1874, he recorded 43 consecutive victories and won the equivalent of four tournaments. However, as the yūshō system was not introduced until 1909, these championship victories are now considered unofficial. During this period of domination he once again changed his shikona to Raiden Shin'emon (雷電 震右エ門) to evoke legendary ōzeki Raiden Tameemon, who was regarded as the strongest wrestler in history. Shin'emon was the only wrestler to use the shikona Raiden after the retirement of Raiden Tameemon. After him, no other professional wrestler took the ring name "Raiden" and that name is today considered an unauthorised ring name, just like the shikona that later became elder share.

In 1877, Shin'emon was himself promoted to ōzeki. To celebrate his promotion, he led an 80-people tournament in his hometown. However, his performances stagnated because of illness to the point where he lost his ōzeki rank in just two tournaments. After losing this rank, he took the shikona of Ōnomatsu Wasuke (阿武松 和助). In 1880 he won a final championship and bounced back at the rank of sekiwake. He then gradually dropped down the ranking until he retired in 1881.

== After retirement ==
Shin'emon wished to carry on the elder share of his former master Ōnomatsu, but his stablemate sekiwake Koyanagi succeeded instead as the fourth-generation Ōnomatsu. It's possible that the inheritance of Ōnomatsu's name was decided because Shin'emon was known for his negative opinion of the elders and had campaigned for a time for the abolition of this system. Koyanagi was however forced to abandon the elder name as he decided to become a student of Takasago Uragorō during an internal incident in the Edo-sumo Association which saw the birth of a revisionist group called the Takasago Kaisei-Gumi (高砂改正組). During the expulsion of Koyanagi, Shin'emon briefly served as toshiyori under the name Ōnomatsu. Shin'emon died prematurely on 7 June 1886, although the date of his death was also given by Sankei Sports as 4 May. Since Shin'emon used the name Ōnomatsu during the expulsion of Koyanagi, he is not officially considered part of the official line of elders who held the name "Ōnomatsu".

However, during his time as Ōnomatsu, Shin'emon raised an apprentice, jūryō-wrestler Kabutoyama Inosuke (兜山 亥之介). Kabutoyama assumed the shikona Ōnomatsu Wasuke II when he was still a wrestler to evoke his former master. Kabutoyama was however forced to change his ring name to Shibatayama (芝田山) after a complaint from the fifth-generation Ōnomatsu (former sekiwake Takamiyama Sōgorō), since there couldn't be two Ōnomatsu at the same time. Since Kabutoyama founded the line of elders bearing the name Shibatayama from his former shikona of Ōnomatsu Wasuke, Raiden Shin'emon (as the first Ōnomatsu Wasuke) is considered the first generation of Shibatayama, although he never held the name himself.

== Top division record ==
Raiden Shin'emon
-	Spring	Summer
1868	Unknown	East Jūryō #10; 8–2
1869	East Jūryō #4; 6–3	East Jūryō #1; 6–2
1870	East Maegashira #7; 7–1–2; Unofficial	East Maegashira #5; 6–0–3; 1d Unofficial
1871	East Maegashira #3; 3–7–0	West Maegashira #2; 4–2–2; 1d-1h
1872	West Maegashira #2; 6–0–1; 2d-1h Unofficial	East Komusubi #1; 8–0–2; Unofficial
1873	East Sekiwake #1; 7–0–1; 2h	East Sekiwake #1; 4–0–6
1874	East Sekiwake #1; 7–0–1; 2d	East Sekiwake #1; 6–0–1; 3d
1875	East Sekiwake #1; 0–0–10	Unknown
1876	East Sekiwake #1; 7–2–1	East Sekiwake #1; 5–1–2; 2d
1877	West Ōzeki #1; 5–2–2; 1d	West Ōzeki #1; 0–0–10
1878	West Haridashi Komusubi; 0–0–10	West Haridashi Komusubi; 0–0–10
1879	East Haridashi Komusubi; 5–3–1; 1d	East Komusubi #1; 6–1–2; 1h
1880	East Sekiwake #1; 6–2–1; 1d Unofficial	West Sekiwake #1; 0–0–10
1881	West Komusubi #1; 0–4–5; 1d	West Maegashira #3; Retired; 0–0–10
Record given as win-loss-absent Top Division Champion Retired Lower Divisions Key: d=Draw(s) (引分); h=Hold(s) (預り); nr=no result recorded Divisions: Makuuchi — Jūryō — Makushita — Sandanme — Jonidan — Jonokuchi Makuuchi ranks: Yokozuna (not ranked as such on banzuke until 1890); Ōzeki — Sekiwake — Komusubi — Maegashira

*Championships for the best record in a tournament were not recognized or awarded before the 1909 summer tournament and the above championships that are labelled "unofficial" are historically conferred. For more information see yūshō.

== See also ==
- Glossary of sumo terms
- List of past sumo wrestlers
- List of ōzeki
