= Raiden Fighters Jet =

1998 video game

- Developer: Seibu Kaihatsu
- Publishers: JP: Seibu Kaihatsu; NA: Fabtek; WW: DotEmu (PC); DE: Tuning
- Composer: Yasuhiro Hashimoto
- Series: Raiden
- Platforms: Arcade, Windows
- Release: Arcade; 1998; Windows; May 16, 2013
- Genre: Scrolling shooter
- Modes: Single-player, multiplayer
- Arcade system: Seibu SPI System

Raiden Fighters Jet (ライデンファイターズJET, Raiden Faitāzu Jetto) is a 1998 vertically scrolling shooter arcade video game developed and published by Seibu Kaihatsu. It is the sequel to Raiden Fighters 2, released one year later. Raiden Fighters Jet retains the same game mechanics as its predecessors, while introducing new ones in a departure from the previous games.

== Gameplay ==
The Hybrid Attack from Raiden Fighters 2 returns in this game. This special attack has been given a graphical facelift, but otherwise remains the same functionally.

A mechanic introduced in this game gauges stage progression based on the player's performance. If the player performs well in a stage, the next stage will have a higher level number, allowing the player to reach the real levels (Phase 1 and Phase 2) earlier. Players not performing well will be sent to a lower level number, or the game session ends early. Additional game modes include playing through all boss encounters only, and a mode in which enemies return fire after being destroyed.

=== Fighter craft ===
Most of the fighter craft from Raiden Fighters 2 appear in this game. Players can choose the color of their selected craft. This game introduces the Ixion, an aircraft with a forward-swept wing configuration, similar to the Grumman X-29 and the Sukhoi Su-47.

Players can either select the Ixion directly at the beginning of the game, or their selected fighter (that is not a secret fighter like the Raiden II and Viper Phase 1 ships) is upgraded to the Ixion upon reaching Phase 1, equipping it with the original fighter's secondary weapons while using the Ixion's primary weapon and movement speed.

=== Plot ===
Raiden Fighters Jet's stage branching mechanic is explained in the game as being part of a training simulation that gauges the player's performance in the simulation. Players who perform well in the simulation will get a chance to pilot the Ixion in a real mission. Depending on the player's performance in the real mission, they will be either given the chance to fight a bomber carrying a nuclear cruise missile or be forced to withdraw before engaging it.

== Music ==
Raiden Fighters Jet's soundtrack was composed by Yasuhiro Hashimoto and consists of rave and techno music in a departure from the more melodic pop orientated style of the original Raiden game series.

== Ports and conversions ==
A compilation of all three Raiden Fighters games for the Xbox 360, titled Raiden Fighters Aces, was published by Japanese software company Success Corporation and released on March 27, 2008.

== Other versions ==
Raiden Fighters Jet 2000, a clone for the Chinese market, runs on cheaper hardware and features notoriously inferior sound than the original.

A newer single-board version was released for the US market. This version of Raiden Fighters Jet is a standalone version that has all of the fighters available from the start.

== Reception ==
In Japan, Game Machine listed Raiden Fighters Jet on their October 1, 1998 issue as being the sixth most-successful arcade game of the month.
