= Okami (disambiguation) =

Ōkami is an action-adventure video game.

Okami or variants may also refer to:

== People ==
- Kei Okami (1859–1941), Japanese physician
- Yushin Okami (born 1981), Japanese mixed martial artist
- Ookami Mio, Japanese Virtual Youtuber

== Other uses ==
- Japanese wolf, historically ōkami, an extinct subspecies of the gray wolf
- Kuraokami, or Okami, a legendary Japanese dragon and Shinto deity of rain and snow
- Okami Station, a station in Shimane Prefecture, Japan

== See also ==
- Okami-san, a sports manga
- Okami-san and Her Seven Companions, a collection of Japanese light novels
