= Raiden Fighters =

1996 video game

- Developer: Seibu Kaihatsu
- Publishers: Fabtek (US); Metrotainment (HK); Tuning Electronic (DE); DotEmu (PC)
- Series: Raiden
- Platforms: Arcade, Microsoft Windows
- Release: Arcade; 1996; Microsoft Windows; May 16, 2013
- Genre: Vertical scrolling shooter
- Modes: Single-player, multiplayer
- Arcade system: Seibu SPI System

Raiden Fighters (ライデンファイターズ, Raiden Faitāzu) is a 1996 vertical-scrolling shooter arcade game developed and published by Seibu Kaihatsu. It is followed by the sequel, Raiden Fighters 2: Operation Hell Dive. This game introduced new game mechanics that separate it from the original Raiden series.

== Plot ==
The opening prologue of Raiden Fighters 2 hints at a plot from this game. The protagonists are at war against an army headed by a dictator. Raiden Fighters 2 indicates that its story takes place four years after the events of this game.

== Stages ==
Examples of gameplay from Raiden Fighters: the fighter craft use their weaponry against the enemy.

The game's seven levels are divided into three missions. The first two missions have three levels each, the first two levels being randomly ordered. The final mission takes the player to the enemy's main fortress.

== Fighter craft ==
In Raiden Fighters, there are five available fighter craft, each with a Laser and a Missile weapon. Each fighter craft has different strengths and weaknesses. Depending on a particular machine's settings, ships from the earlier Seibu Kaihatsu titles Raiden II and Viper Phase 1 can be chosen. These two ships (given the names Raiden mk-II and Judge Spear respectively) have different mechanics from the five regular craft, such as different bombs and the ability to use Laser and Missile weapons simultaneously. The Slave plane is playable, inheriting the bomb and movement speed of the fighter craft they normally accompany.

== Reception ==
In Japan, Game Machine listed Raiden Fighters on their December 15, 1996 issue as being the third most popular arcade game of that two week period.
