= Raiden II =

1993 video game

- North American arcade flyer
- Developers: Seibu Kaihatsu; Kinesoft; NuFX (Windows)
- Publishers: JP: Seibu Kaihatsu; NA: Fabtek; Nihon System (PlayStation); GameBank (Windows)
- Series: Raiden
- Platforms: Arcade, PlayStation, Windows
- Release: Arcade; October 1993; July 1994 (DX); PlayStation: JP: January 27, 1995; NA: September 9, 1995; PAL: November, 1995; DX: JP: April 11, 1997; Windows: JP: June 6, 1997
- Genre: Scrolling shooter
- Modes: Single-player, multiplayer

Raiden II (雷電II, Raiden Tsū) is a 1993 vertically scrolling shooter arcade video game developed and published by Seibu Kaihatsu. It is the second game in the Raiden series which started with Raiden in 1990.

Raiden II was ported to Windows by Kinesoft and Microsoft Corporation. The Windows version uses Red Book audio for music. This game and the original Raiden were released for the PlayStation as The Raiden Project.

== Gameplay ==
Gameplay screenshot from the arcade version

This game expands on the first Raiden's mechanics, introducing two weapons: the Bend Plasma, a lock-on weapon that deals constant low damage to enemies, and the Cluster Bomb, a fast-deploying bomb that does less damage than regular bombs but strikes a larger area.

Raiden II has three primary weapons and two missile weapons, upgraded by collecting power-ups. Primary weapons and missiles are fired simultaneously. Bombs are special weapons that deal damage over a wide area and cancel out enemy fire. Players can carry a maximum of seven of any combination of the two types of bombs in the game.

The player fights enemies through eight stages of increasing difficulty. In a two-player game, when one player shoots the other's craft with the red or blue primary weapon, the other player's craft generates special projectiles that deal a lot of damage to enemies.

=== Plot ===
The game's story continues where the first game left off. Three years after the VCD repelled the invasion of the Crystals, the remnants of the machines controlled by the Crystals regroup to form another army to resume taking over the Earth. To combat this Crystal resurgence, a new weapon is developed for the Fighting Thunder—designed from Crystal technology—to stop the Crystals again.

== Raiden DX ==
Raiden DX (雷電DX, Raiden Dīekkusu) is an alternate version of Raiden II. It has three different game modes: a 15-minute long unbroken stage that does not allow players to continue, the first five stages of Raiden II, and eight stages (plus one bonus) with new layouts. Raiden DX was ported to the PlayStation in Japan. This version includes a PS-exclusive soundtrack, the Viper Phase 1 soundtrack, the arcade original soundtrack, The Master of Raiden, encyclopedia, and other features. The PlayStation version was re-released by Hamster Corporation in 2000.

== Reception ==
In Japan, Game Machine listed Raiden II on their February 1, 1994 issue as being the most-successful table arcade unit at the time. In North America, RePlay reported Raiden II to be the second most-popular arcade game at the time. Game Machine also listed Raiden DX on their September 15, 1994 issue as being the fifth most-successful table arcade unit at the time. RePlay also reported Raiden DX to be the fifth most-popular arcade game at the time. Play Meter listed Raiden II to be the thirty-sixth most-popular arcade game at the time.
