= Raiden (video game) =

1990 video game

- Japanese arcade flyer
- Developer: Seibu Kaihatsu: Micronet (Genesis) A.I Company, Ltd. (PCE CD/TG-16) Micronics (Super NES) KID (FM Towns) Imagitec Design (Jaguar/MS-DOS) BlueSky Software (Lynx) Com2uS (Mobile)
- Publishers: Tecmo: Arcade; JP: Tecmo; NA: Fabtek Mega Drive/Genesis; JP/NA: Micronet TurboGrafx-16; JP: Hudson Soft; NA: NEC Technologies Super NES; JP: Toei Animation; NA: Electro Brain FM Towns; JP: KID PC Engine Super CD-ROM²; JP: Hudson Soft Jaguar; NA/EU: Atari Corporation; JP: Mumin Corporation MS-DOS; NA: Acer PlayStation; JP: Seibu Kaihatsu; NA: Sony Computer Entertainment; EU: Ocean Software Lynx; NA/EU: Telegames
- Producer: Hitoshi Hamada
- Designer: Tetsuya Kawaguchi
- Programmers: K. Kondo; S. Mori
- Artists: H. Matsuo; Toshinobu Komazawa; T. Matsuzawa
- Composer: Akira Sato
- Series: Raiden
- Platform: Arcade: Jaguar, Atari Lynx, FM Towns, Mega Drive/Genesis, MS-DOS, Windows, Mobile phone, PC Engine Super CD-ROM², PlayStation, Super Nintendo Entertainment System, TurboGrafx-16
- Release: April 1990: Arcade; WW: April 1990 Mega Drive/Genesis; JP: 6 July 1991; NA: September 1991 TurboGrafx-16; JP: 22 November 1991; NA: 1991 Super NES; JP: 29 November 1991; NA: April 1992 FM Towns; JP: November 1991 PC Engine Super CD-ROM²; JP: 2 April 1992 Jaguar; NA: 23 November 1993; EU: June 1994; JP: 15 December 1994 MS-DOS; NA: 1994 PlayStation; JP: 27 January 1995; NA: 9 September 1995; EU: November 1995 Lynx; NA/EU: 1997
- Genre: Scrolling shooter
- Modes: Single-player, multiplayer

Raiden (Note: Japanese: 雷電; also known as Raiden Trad, Raiden Densetsu (雷電伝説) and Super Raiden on other platforms. The title in Japanese translates to "Thunder And Lightning"; Rai means thunder and den means lightning. The closest English approximation of the pronunciation is /ˈraɪdɛn/ RY-den.) is a 1990 vertically scrolling shooter video game developed by Seibu Kaihatsu and published by Tecmo for arcades. The game's story takes place in the year 2090, when an alien species known as the Crystals invaded Earth. Players assume the roles of the Vanquish Crystal Defense pilot duo, taking control of two state of the art Fighting Thunders aircraft to defeat the Crystals and save the Earth.

The game was conceived after Dynamite Duke, Seibu Kaihatsu's prior title, failed to sell as well as expected. During development, the game was designed as a vertically scrolling shooter due to the popularity of the genre at the time. Cheaper arcade hardware had to be used due to financial constraints caused by Dynamite Duke's poor sales.

Although Seibu doubted Raiden's success, it managed to sell 17,000 arcade units worldwide, helping to recuperate the company's investments through word-of-mouth. The title became a critical success, with its most lauded features being the graphics, music, gameplay and co-operative play.

Due to the success of Raiden, several sequels and related games were made. Raiden was ported to home computers and various home video game consoles in the early to mid 1990s. The game was released as part of several compilations and through download services such as PlayStation Network. The ports received mixed to positive reception.

== Gameplay ==
Arcade version screenshot

Raiden is a vertically scrolling shoot 'em up game consisting of eight stages of increasing difficulty. In each stage, the player maneuvers the Fighting Thunder craft, engaging various enemies and avoiding their attacks. In cooperative play, both players can generate special projectiles that damage enemies by shooting the other player craft. After completing the eighth and final stage, the player returns to the first stage with the difficulty increased.

Collectible items include bombs, which cancel out enemy fire and deal damage over a wide area; weapon power-ups; and score-increasing medals. There are two bonus collectible items: the Miclus (a boss in Seibu Kaihatsu's 1985 title Wiz) and a fairy that releases power-up items when the player dies. When the player dies, the fighter's shrapnel become projectiles that damage enemies. If all lives are lost during a gameplay session, the game is over unless players insert more credits into the arcade machine to continue playing. Upon continuing, the player will start at the last checkpoint reached.

== Plot ==
The story of Raiden takes place in the year 2090, when a species of alien lifeforms known as the Crystals invaded Earth. The Crystals took control over most of Earth's military hardware to use in the invasion. In response, the world organization known as Vanquish Crystal Defense (VCD) develops the Fighting Thunder attack craft, a cutting-edge weapon based on Crystal technology. To survive against the invaders and fight back, VCD deploys Fighting Thunder as the only hope for humanity. The game's setting and storyline focus on the use of advanced alien technology and resistance against the Crystal invasion.

== Development ==
According to graphic designer and current MOSS CEO Toshinobu Komazawa, the creation of Dynamite Duke gave Seibu Kaihatsu the opportunity to begin developing Raiden, as the former did not sell as well as Seibu had hoped. In order to recoup the costs of developing Dynamite Duke, the decision was made to develop a shoot 'em up instead of a sequel to it. Komazawa noted that the development of Raiden had a negative outlook, but an earnest beginning, since the shoot 'em up genre was "relatively inexpensive to produce" games for, as well as increasing in popularity at the time. Due to financial constraints, the company opted to use arcade hardware less powerful than those used in their previous titles. Seibu could only afford to develop a shoot 'em up with their development budget, with the project becoming a financial decision, as they had no other choice of game to make. Seibu took production notes from the overseas market, borrowing ideas from popular titles such as Capcom's 1942, Xevious from Namco, and Twin Cobra by Toaplan.

The production of Raiden was led by Seibu Kaihatsu president Hitoshi Hamada, while Tetsuya Kawaguchi served as its designer and programmer K. Kondo and S. Mori were the other programmers. Komazawa, H. Matsuo, T. Matsuzawa and T. Wada were responsible for creating the in-game artwork. Y. Segawa was responsible for creating the arcade hardware. Near the end of development, Komazawa praised the programmers at Seibu for being able to produce a high-quality game on less powerful hardware.

=== Music ===
The music for Raiden was composed by Akira Sato. A Raiden/Raiden II soundtrack was published by INH Co., Ltd. It includes soundtracks from Raiden (Arcade, PlayStation), Raiden Densetsu (FM Towns), Raiden II (Arcade, PlayStation) and Raiden DX (Arcade) as well as other extras.

== Release and ports ==
Raiden was first released in the arcades in April 1990 by Tecmo in Japan. It was released in North America by Fabtek, Taiwan by Liang HWA Electronics, South Korea by IBL Corporation, and Hong Kong by Wah Yan Electronics. The game was ported to various platforms, with each port featuring several changes and additions. In 2022, the arcade version will be included as part of the Sega Astro City Mini V, a vertically oriented variant of the Sega Astro City mini console.

The PC Engine conversion was developed by A.I Company and first published by Hudson Soft in Japan on 22 November 1991, and released a few months later on the North American TurboGrafx-16 by NEC Technologies. It is a mostly faithful port of the arcade original.

The Atari Jaguar version was developed by Imagitec Design, then released in North America in November 1993. The North America, Europe and Japan releases were distributed by Atari Corporation and Mumin Corporation in 1994 respectively. It features various presentation and gameplay changes from the original arcade version.

The MS-DOS port was coded by Nigel 'Freddy' Conroy, Steve Cullen and Martin Randall, and spearheaded by Martin Hooley at Imagitec. It shares the same visual design as the Jaguar conversion with the addition of a full-screen display. Its differences from the Jaguar port include support only for FM sound. It was released only in North America in 1994.

A handheld version was developed by BlueSky Software and launched for the Atari Lynx across North America and Europe in 1997 by Telegames, long after the Lynx's commercial lifespan had ended. It was only available through direct order and a few select retailers.

=== Raiden Trad and Raiden Densetsu ===
The FM Towns release was titled Raiden Densetsu ("Legend of Raiden") in Japan, while both the Mega Drive/Genesis and Super Nintendo Entertainment System ports were given the name Raiden Trad across all regions ("Trad" being an abbreviation of tradition, an alternative meaning of densetsu). Each version of Trad was developed and distributed by different developers and publishers; Toei Animation published the SNES version despite not providing animation services. A European release of the Mega Drive version was planned for release by Ubi Soft as part of a multi-game licensing deal with Bignet, but was never officially released in the region.

=== Super Raiden ===
Super Raiden is a PC Engine Super CD-ROM² version of the TurboGrafx-16 HuCard port. Its main new feature is the use of Redbook CD Audio for an arranged soundtrack, along with additional stages exclusive to the CD version. It was developed by A.I Company and released on 2 April 1992, in Japan by Hudson Soft.

=== The Raiden Project ===
Both the original Raiden and Raiden II were included as part of The Raiden Project compilation. The included games are based directly on the original arcade releases and offers several options not found in other ports. The Project version of the first Raiden was re-released by Hamster Corporation as a stand-alone PlayStation title for their Arcade Hits series. It was later available as a digital download on the Japanese PlayStation Network store, playable on the PlayStation 3 and the PlayStation Portable.

=== Re-releases ===
Raiden was first adapted on mobile phones by Com2uS in 2004. The original game was later included as part of the 2012 compilation Raiden Legacy by DotEmu for mobile devices, PCs and other platforms. Raiden Legacy also includes the three games in the Raiden Fighters sub-series. On July 1, 2021, the arcade version of the game got ported for modern consoles as part of the Arcade Archives series.

=== Cancelled ports ===
An Amiga version was announced in late 1993 to be under development by Imagitec Design. It was intended to be published by U.S. Gold, but according to a former Imagitec employee on an Amiga-dedicated internet forum, it was left unreleased due to the arrival of newer systems on the market. Another version was made by Imagitec for the Atari Falcon, announced in 1994. Early playable builds of both versions have since been leaked online.

== Reception ==
Reception
Aggregate scores
Aggregator	Scores							
Aggregator	SMD/GEN	TG-16	SNES	PCE SCD-ROM²	JAG	DOS	Lynx	Mobile
GameRankings	50%	—N/a	57.50%	—N/a	60%	—N/a	—N/a	72%
Review scores
Publication	Scores							
Publication	SMD/GEN	TG-16	SNES	PCE SCD-ROM²	JAG	DOS	Lynx	Mobile
ASM	—N/a	—N/a	4/12	—N/a	8/12	—N/a	—N/a	—N/a
AllGame	—N/a	3.5/5	—N/a	—N/a	2.5/5	2.5/5	3.5/5	—N/a
AGH	—N/a	—N/a	—N/a	—N/a	5/10	—N/a	9/10	—N/a
Atari ST User	—N/a	—N/a	—N/a	—N/a	40%	—N/a	—N/a	—N/a
Beep! Mega Drive	6.5/10	—N/a	—N/a	—N/a	—N/a	—N/a	—N/a	—N/a
CVG	—N/a	—N/a	—N/a	—N/a	44/100	—N/a	—N/a	—N/a
Consoles +	67%	91%	69%	91%	—N/a	—N/a	—N/a	—N/a
Edge	—N/a	—N/a	—N/a	—N/a	5/10	—N/a	—N/a	—N/a
Electronic Games	—N/a	—N/a	—N/a	—N/a	86% B+	—N/a	—N/a	—N/a
EGM	29/40	30/40	—N/a	—N/a	24/40	—N/a	—N/a	—N/a
Famitsu	27/40	28/40	—N/a	29/40	—N/a	—N/a	—N/a	—N/a
GameFan	—N/a	—N/a	—N/a	—N/a	329/400	—N/a	—N/a	—N/a
GamePro	19/25	—N/a	15/20	—N/a	14/20	—N/a	—N/a	—N/a
GameSpot	—N/a	—N/a	—N/a	—N/a	—N/a	—N/a	—N/a	7.2/10
Génération 4	—N/a	91%	—N/a	92%	62%	—N/a	—N/a	—N/a
Hobby Consolas	—N/a	91/100	—N/a	—N/a	—N/a	—N/a	—N/a	—N/a
Hyper	—N/a	—N/a	—N/a	—N/a	61%	—N/a	—N/a	—N/a
IGN	—N/a	—N/a	—N/a	—N/a	—N/a	—N/a	7.0/10	—N/a
Joypad	—N/a	85%	71%	91%	64%	—N/a	—N/a	—N/a
Joystick	70%	82%	71%	90%	—N/a	—N/a	—N/a	—N/a
MAN!AC	—N/a	—N/a	—N/a	—N/a	61%	—N/a	—N/a	—N/a
Mean Machines	81%	—N/a	—N/a	—N/a	—N/a	—N/a	—N/a	—N/a
MDAG	81%	—N/a	—N/a	—N/a	—N/a	—N/a	—N/a	—N/a
Mega Fun	—N/a	—N/a	—N/a	—N/a	63%	—N/a	—N/a	—N/a
MegaTech	79%	—N/a	—N/a	—N/a	—N/a	—N/a	—N/a	—N/a
Nintendo Power	—N/a	—N/a	11.5/20	—N/a	—N/a	—N/a	—N/a	—N/a
Play Time	—N/a	74%	—N/a	—N/a	60/100	—N/a	—N/a	—N/a
Player One	60%	77%	—N/a	89%	—N/a	—N/a	—N/a	—N/a
Power Play	56%	—N/a	41%	—N/a	—N/a	59%	—N/a	—N/a
Sega Power	4/5; 68%	—N/a	—N/a	—N/a	—N/a	—N/a	—N/a	—N/a
Sega Pro	76/100; 58/100	—N/a	—N/a	—N/a	—N/a	—N/a	—N/a	—N/a
ST-Computer	—N/a	—N/a	—N/a	—N/a	60%	—N/a	—N/a	—N/a
ST Format	—N/a	—N/a	—N/a	—N/a	70%	—N/a	—N/a	—N/a
ST Review	—N/a	—N/a	—N/a	—N/a	67%	—N/a	—N/a	—N/a
Super Game	91/100	—N/a	—N/a	—N/a	—N/a	—N/a	—N/a	—N/a
Super Game Power	—N/a	—N/a	—N/a	—N/a	3.3/5.0	—N/a	—N/a	—N/a
TurboPlay	—N/a	8/10	—N/a	—N/a	—N/a	—N/a	—N/a	—N/a
Video Games	—N/a	—N/a	—N/a	—N/a	60%	—N/a	—N/a	—N/a

=== Arcade ===
The original arcade release of Raiden did not make as much money initially, with Komazawa attributing this to the game's underpowered hardware and lack of flashy visuals to draw players in. A few months after its release, the game began to generate increased income, resulting in an increase in arcade establishments requesting orders of the hardware. Seibu Kaihatsu ended up selling around 17,000 units through steady sales for a year.

In Japan, Game Machine listed the title on its 1 July 1990 issue as being the most successful table arcade unit at the time, outperforming titles such as Lightning Fighters and Columns. It went on to be Japan's sixth highest-grossing arcade game of 1990 and fifth highest-grossing arcade game of 1991.

It was also an arcade hit for Fabtek in North America, where it became a chart-topper. During November and December 1990, weekly coin drop earnings averaged $194.25 per arcade unit.

Raiden was included as one of the titles in the 2010 book 1001 Video Games You Must Play Before You Die.

=== Jaguar ===
Electronic Gaming Monthly gave the Atari Jaguar version an average of 6 out of 10. The four reviewers agreed that it was virtually identical to the arcade version, but were divided about the quality of the game itself. Two of them described Raiden as "above average", and two described it as mediocre, saying that the ship moves too slow, enemy fire often blends in with the background, and the graphics are subpar given the Jaguar's capabilities. GamePro similarly criticized that the gameplay is outdated, the ship moves too slow, and that the graphics do not live up to the Jaguar's potential. They concluded that "a snoozer like Raiden just seems out of place on a powerful system like the Jaguar". The Jaguar version has sold more than 22,000 copies since its release as of 1 April 1995, though it is unknown how many were sold in total during its lifetime.

== Legacy ==
The success of Raiden resulted in several sequels and spin-offs across multiple platforms. Seibu Kaihatsu developed the Raiden games until they went bankrupt in 2005. Japanese developer MOSS, formed by Seibu Kaihatsu's development staff, purchased the rights to the series, with their first release being Raiden III in 2005. In 1994, the game's trademark was abandoned.
