= Viper Phase 1 =

1995 video game

- Arcade flyer
- Developer: Seibu Kaihatsu
- Publishers: JP: Seibu Kaihatsu; NA: Fabtek
- Series: Raiden
- Platform: Arcade
- Release: JP: May 1995; NA: October 1995
- Genre: Scrolling shooter
- Modes: Single-player, multiplayer

Viper Phase 1 (Note: Japanese: バイパーフェイズ1, Hepburn: Baipā Feizu Wan) is a 1995 vertically scrolling shooter video game developed and published by Seibu Kaihatsu for arcades. It was released in Japan in May 1995 and in North America by Fabtek in October 1995. It is a spin-off in the Raiden series set in space. Hamster Corporation released the game as part of their Arcade Archives series for the Nintendo Switch and PlayStation 4 in December 2024.

== Gameplay ==
The game is set in outer space. Players pilot their space fighter through eight stages of enemy space fleets and bosses. Enemies include small space fighters, space cruisers, space frigates, and entire space installations.

A bonus is assessed at the end of each stage taking into account the number of medals collected, the number of enemies destroyed, the number of bombs in stock, and the total kill percentage. At the end of the game, a grand tally is assessed. Factors taken into account are the number of continues used and the number of lives lost. The American version gives the player permanent access to all secondary weapons instead of having limited ammunition, though they deal considerably less damage to compensate.

== Reception ==
In Japan, Game Machine listed Viper Phase 1 on their July 1, 1995 issue as being the ninth most-successful arcade game of the month. In North America, RePlay reported Viper Phase 1 was the sixth most-popular arcade game at the time. A critic for Next Generation praised the game's beautiful visuals and increasing level of difficulty, but added that "like all shooters, unless your hand-eye coordination is really solid, the fun will pass you right by". He gave it three out of five stars.
