= Raiden III =

2005 video game

- Japanese PS2 box art
- Developer: MOSS
- Publishers: MOSS: MOSS PlayStation 2; JP: Taito; NA: UFO Interactive Games; EU: 505 Games Windows Cyberfront Mobile Namco Bandai Games x MIKADO MANIAX NIS America
- Series: Raiden
- Platforms: Arcade, Windows, PlayStation 2, i-mode, Yahoo Mobile, EZweb x MIKADO MANIAX; Nintendo Switch, PlayStation 4, PlayStation 5, Xbox One, Xbox Series X/S
- Release: March 2005: Arcade; JP: March 2005 (Taito Type X); JP: 29 March 2012 (NESiCAxLive) PS2; JP: 22 September 2005; EU: 6 October 2006; NA: 17 April 2007 Windows; JP: 17 March 2006; TW: 8 August 2006; WW: 25 September 2014 Mobile phones; JP: 19 April 2006 (i-mode); JP: 5 May 2006 (Yahoo); JP: 15 November 2006 (EZweb) x MIKADO MANIAX; JP: February 23, 2023; NA: June 6, 2023; AU/EU: June 9, 2023
- Genre: Scrolling shooter
- Modes: Single-player, multiplayer
- Arcade system: Taito Type X, Taito NESiCAxLive

Raiden III (雷電III, Raiden Surī) is a vertically scrolling shooter developed by MOSS and released in as an arcade video game in 2005. It is the fourth game in Seibu Kaihatsu's Raiden series; it is the first installment in the series to be developed by MOSS as it consists of former Seibu Kaihatsu employees who bought the rights to the series. Raiden III uses the Taito Type X arcade hardware, giving full 3D graphics to the series for the first time. The game was published in the US by UFO Interactive Games, in Europe by 505 Games, and in China by Soft-World International Corporation. An enhanced version, Raiden III x Mikado Maniax, was released in 2023 by NIS America.

== Gameplay ==
Raiden III shares the same mechanics as the previous games in the series, while introducing new mechanics to set it apart from its predecessors. Players are given a new primary weapon, the piercing Proton Laser, and a new missile weapon, the Radar Missile. New mechanics introduced in this game include the Flash Shot multiplier, which increases score the faster an appearing enemy is destroyed, and Double Play, which allows one player to control both ships with one controller. Raiden III is the first game in the series to give the player craft smaller hitboxes. The bombs were changed to deploy instantly and cover the entire screen, as opposed to the earlier games' delayed explosion and smaller area of damage.

The game consists of seven stages of increasing difficulty, with the first three levels taking place on Earth and the last four taking place in space.

=== Plot ===
In Raiden III, the Crystals have begun another invasion of Earth. VCD deploys a new model of the Fighting Thunder, the ME-02, to stop the Crystals and save the Earth. The game's ending sequence shows the player's Fighting Thunder craft landing on the wreck of another Fighting Thunder craft, transforming into a Fairy.

== Ports ==
=== Windows and PlayStation 2 ===
The Windows port of Raiden III was published by Soft-World International corporation. It includes an English translation of the Japanese text. The Windows version was re-released internationally on download services in 2014. The Windows version is a nearly perfect port of the arcade version.

UFO Interactive Games obtained the publishing rights to the PlayStation 2 version of Raiden III and released the game in the US in April 2007. They also released the PlayStation 2 version on the PlayStation 3 through PlayStation Network in 2011.

=== Mobile phones ===
The Yahoo Mobile, i-mode, EZ-Web versions contain 3 difficulty levels.

=== Enhanced version ===
An enhanced version, Raiden III x Mikado Maniax, was released on February 23, 2023, in Japan for the Nintendo Switch, PlayStation 4, PlayStation 5, Xbox One, and Xbox Series X/S. North American released was on June 6, 2023, and European and Oceania released was on June 9, 2023.

== Related media ==
=== The Flash Desire Raiden III Game Capture DVD ===
The game capture DVD of Raiden III was released on November 2, 2006. The DVD version contains 120 minutes of footage, while the CD version contains 70 minutes. Its features include:

- Contents 01 - Raiden III Normal Mode Capture Image (Kinomoto will not be in charge of playing; it plays back one-coin capture images of the same work from start to the ending).
- Contents 02 - Raiden III Double Play Mode Capture Image (Hattori will be in charge of playing; it plays back 1 coin capture images of the same work from start to the ending).
- Contents 03 - OUT TAKE (other than the score image which is higher than normal mode main part, wonderful phenomenon and income technique, the user records the opening movie).
- Soundtrack CD (see below)

=== Game-related Tracks ===
1. Shoot like lightning (Opening demo)
2. Takeoff with the suffer (Start demo)
3. Lightning strikes (Level 1)
4. Passing pleasures (Boss)
5. Mission accomplishment (Level clear)
6. Electric Resistance (Level 2)
7. Dawn of sorrow (Level 3)
8. A labyrinth of steel (Level 4)
9. Intruder (Level 5)
10. Invisible menace (Level 6)
11. Last fear (Level 7)
12. Fairy (Ending)
13. Game Over for Raiden I (Game over)
14. Carve your name (Name entry)
15. Preparations (PS2 Main menu)
