= Ryūzaburō Ōtomo =

Japanese voice actor

- 大友 龍三郎
- Born: May 18, 1952 (age 74); Tanashi, Tokyo, Japan
- Occupations: Actor; narrator
- Years active: 1977–present
- Notable credits: Dragon Ball as Dabura; Digimon Adventure as Myotismon; One Piece as Crocodile and Whitebeard; The Hobbit film series as Smaug

Ryūzaburō Ōtomo (大友 龍三郎, Ōtomo Ryūzaburō) is a freelance Japanese actor and narrator who was formerly affiliated with Aoni Production, 81 Produce and the Tokyo Actor's Consumer's Cooperative Society.

Due to his deep voice, he often plays villainous characters like fellow voice actor Norio Wakamoto, either in children's programs such as Mahōjin Guru Guru (as Lord Giri), Myotismon from Digimon, Crocodile from One Piece, Montana Jones (as Lord Zero), Yūsha Keisatsu J-Decker (as Jūsan Saejima) and Shadow the Hedgehog (as Black Doom). He has taken over ongoing roles for voice actors Shigezō Sasaoka, Eiji Kanie, Shinji Nakae, Daisuke Gōri and Hirotaka Suzuoki after their deaths. A number of his foreign film-dubbing roles are occupied by Tesshō Genda in different editions of those films.

== Filmography ==
=== Television animation ===
Year	Title	Role	Notes
1979	The Ultraman	Roiger	
1980	Zenderman	Musashi	
1988	Soreike! Anpanman	Kaseki no Maō	
1990	The Three-Eyed One	Macbeth	
1991	Yokoyama Mitsuteru Sangokushi	Dong Zhuo	
1992	O~i! Ryoma	Gurabā	
1992	Crayon Shin-chan	Pippen	
1994	Brave Police J-Decker	Juzo Saejima, Narrator	
1994	Dragon Ball Z	Dabra	
1994	Ginga Sengoku Gun'yūden Rai	Geni	
1994	Kitaretsu Daihyakka	Priest	
1994	Macross 7	Suren Rangu	
1994	Montana Jones	Lord Zero, Feudal Lord	
1994	Tottemo! Luckyman	Senkaoman, Hitman	
1995	Aris Tantei Kyoku	Urufu-san	
1995	Fushigi Yûgi	Ashitare - Oyado	
1995	Kaitō Saint Tail	Board Chairman	
1995	Kūsōkagashi Sekai Gulliver Boy	Paeria	
1995	Demon Beast Resurrection	Mailman	
1995	Mahōjin Guru Guru	Lord Giri (second voice)	
1995	Virtua Fighter	Jeffry McWild	
1996	Bakusō Kyōdai Let's & Go!!	Doctor Ōgami	
1996	Brave Command Dagwon	Super Lifeform Genocide	
1996	Dragon Ball GT	Liu Xing Long, Giant	
1996	GeGeGe no Kitaro	Oboro Kuroma, Mizutora, Kaiwanao	Fourth series
1996	Jigoku Sensei Nūbē	Sauraki	
1996	Detective Conan	Okita, Shōji Mutsuda	
1997	Bakusō Kyōdai Let's & Go!! WGP	Principal	
1997	Chō Mashin Eiyūden Wataru	Kurogane no Kenō	
1997	Dr. Slump	Unmō, Enma Daiō	
1997	Dragon Ball GT Special: Gokū Gaiden! Yūki no Akashishi ha Shiseikyū	Yōmaō	
1997	Hakugei Densetsu	Barba	
1997	Kindaichi Shōnen no Jigenbo	Zensuke Ōkōchi	
1997	Kyūketsu Hime Miyu	Kami-Ma Garyū	
1997	Detective Conan	Atsushi Mori practitioner	
1997	Nintama Rantarō	Fūki	Second episode
1997	Weiß Kreuz	Shigemi Yokō	
1998	AWOL: Absent Without Leave	Zack Landis	
1998	Bakusō Kyōdai Let's & Go!! Max	Gen-san	
1998	BB-Daman Bakugaiden	Darkmazā, Dark Emperor	
1998	Cowboy Bebop	Abdul Hakim	
1998	Kurogane Communication	Industrial Enterprise Master	
1998	Detective Conan	Shirō Hiraoka	
1998	Pocket Monsters	Fushigibana [Venusaur], Muramasa	
1998	Sentimental Journey	Gakkōrei (Boss)	
1998	Trigun	Denim	
1998	Yu-Gi-Oh!	Ushio	
1999	Digimon Adventure	Vamdemon, VenomVamdemon	
1999	Excel Saga	Doctor Kabapu	
1999	Gregory Horror Show	Hell's Chef	
1999	Detective Conan	Criminal A, Hiruta, Michiaki Okuda	
2000	Doki Doki Densetsu Mahōjin Guru Guru	Lord Giri	
2000	Inuyasha	Hōsenki I	
2000	Detective Conan	Arson offender	
2000	Pocket Monsters	Muramasa	
2001	Super GALS! Kotobuki Ran	Mami's Father	
2001	Ōdorobō Jing	Baffle D'Ice	
2002	Digimon Frontier	Cherubimon	
2002	Dragon Drive	Saizō Toki	
2002	One Piece	Crocodile	
2003	Ashita no Nadja	Gérard	
2003	Astro Boy: Mighty Atom	Gafu	
2003	Bobobo-bo Bo-bobo	Gunkan	
2003	Divergence Eve	Luke Walker	
2003	Gungrave	Bear Walken	
2003	Konjiki no Gash Bell!!	Demolt	
2003	Detective Conan	Saguru Itakura	
2003	Jūbei Ninpūchō: Ryūhōgyoku Hen	Tessai	
2003	Planetes	Hakim Ashmead	
2004	Bōken Ō Beet	Grunide	
2004	Initial D Fourth Stage	Kōzō Hoshino	
2004	Kaiketsu Zorori	Kichizō Kumada	
2004	Detective Conan	Detective	
2004	Samurai 7	Genzō	
2004	Samurai Champloo	Ishimatsu	Episodes 3 and 4
2004	Tenjho Tenge	Kaiba Natsume	
2005	Gaiking: Legend of Daiku-Maryu	Daimon, Darius the Seventeenth	
2005	Pani Poni Dash!	Hirosuke	
2005	Speed Grapher	Father Kanda	
2006	Kiba	J Rock	
2006	Sōten no Ken	Ke-Rong Jin	
2007	Himawari!	Businessman	
2008	Bleach	Aaroniero Arruruerie - deep-voiced head	
2008	Mobile Suit Gundam 00	Homer Katagiri	
2009	Fullmetal Alchemist: Brotherhood	Buccaneer	
2009	Sgt. Frog	Witness	
2010	Halo Legends	Haka	Episode "The Duel"
2010	Kiddy Girl-and	Basil	
2010	Dragon Ball Kai	Porunga, Gyū-Maō, King Cold	
2011	Wolverine	Omega Red	
2011	Digimon Xros Wars	Sethmon	
2011	Digimon Xros Wars: The Young Hunters Who Leapt Through Time	Ogremon	
2012	Mobile Suit Gundam AGE	Fezarl Ezelcant	
2012	Saint Seiya Ω	Capricorn Ionia	
2013	Freezing Vibration	Howard el Bridget	
2014	Dragon Ball Kai	Dabra, Shenlong, Gyū-Maō	
2015	Fafner in the Azure: EXODUS	Narain Wiseman-Bose	
2015	Yo-kai Watch: The Movie	Lord von Shadow	
2015	Dragon Ball Super	Shenlong, Gyū-Maō	
2016	Pandora in the Crimson Shell: Ghost Urn	Janus North	
2017	Princess Principal	Todo Jubei	Episode 5
2017	Digimon Universe: Appli Monsters	Deusmon	
2018	Legend of the Galactic Heroes: Die Neue These	Steinhof	
2018	Baki	Ando	Episode 25
2019	Obsolete	Zahir	
2021	One Piece	Edward Newgate, Kozuki Sukiyaki	
2024	Dandadan	Flatwoods Monster	

=== Original video animation (OVA) ===
Year	Title	Role	Notes
1988	Crying Freeman	Oshu Tohgoku	
1988	Legend of the Galactic Heroes	Sandoru Ararukon	
1992	La Blue Girl	Zipang	
1992	Tenchi Muyo! Ryo-Ohki	D3	
1993	Urotsukidoji	Caesar	
1995	Twin Angels	Demon	
1995	El-Hazard	Galus	
1995	Bio Hunter	Mikawa	
1996	Legend of the Blue Wolves	Continental	
2000	Street Fighter Alpha: The Animation	Birdie	
2002	Macross Zero	D. D. Ivanov	
2014	Avengers Confidential: Black Widow & Punisher	Cain	

=== Theatrical animation ===
Year	Title	Role	Notes
1991	Mobile Suit Gundam F91	Nanto Roos	
1995	Tenchi Muyo! in Love	Kain	
1996	Lupin III: Dead or Alive	Chief warden, officer	
1998	Pokémon: The First Movie	Venusaur	
1998	Soreike! Anpanman: Palm of the Hand to the Sun	Great black devil	
2007	Episode of Alabasta: The Desert Princess and the Pirates	Crocodile	
2010	Naruto Shippuden The Movie: The Lost Tower:	Mukade/Anrokuzan	
2013	Dragon Ball Z: Battle of Gods	Gyū-Maō	
2017	Resident Evil: Vendetta	Diego Gomez	
2018	Doraemon the Movie: Nobita's Treasure Island	Gaga	

=== Video games ===
Year	Title	Role	Console	Refs
1995	Solid Force	Yulgen Froint	Windows	
1997	Mega Man Battle & Chase	Napalm Man	PlayStation	
1997	Mega Man X4	General	PlayStation, Sega Saturn	
1997	The Last Blade	Zantetsu	Arcade, PlayStation	
1998	The Last Blade 2	Zantetsu	Arcade, PlayStation	
1998	Burning Rangers	Big Randoman	Sega Saturn	
1998	Dragon Force II	Frest	Sega Saturn	
1998	Crash Bandicoot 3: Warped	Uka Uka	PlayStation	
1998	Psychic Force 2012	Gudeath	Arcade, Dreamcast, PlayStation	
1999	Crash Team Racing		PlayStation	
2000	Power Stone 2	Gourmand	Sega Naomi, Dreamcast	
2000	Super Robot Wars Alpha	Euzeth Gozzo, Vrlitwhai Kridanik	PlayStation, Dreamcast	
2000	American McGee's Alice	Cheshire Cat (original: Roger L. Jackson)	Windows, Mac	
2000	Brave Saga 2	Jūsan Saejima	PlayStation 2	
2000	Crash Bash	Uka Uka (original: Clancy Brown)	PlayStation	
2001	Crash Bandicoot: The Wrath of Cortex	Uka Uka (original: Clancy Brown)	PlayStation 2	
2001	Star Wars: Galactic Battlegrounds	Darth Vader (original: Scott Lawrence)	Windows, Mac	
2002	Soulcalibur II	Astaroth	Arcade, GameCube, PlayStation 2, Xbox, PlayStation 3, Xbox 360	
2002	Gungrave	Bear Walken	PlayStation 2	
2003	Garasunobara	Kunio Hachiya	PlayStation 2	
2003	Star Ocean: Till the End of Time	Crosell	PlayStation 2	
2003	The Super Dimension Fortress Macross	Buritai Kuridaniku	PlayStation 2	
2003	Gregory Horror Show: Soul Collector	Hell's Chef	PlayStation 2	
2003	Crash Nitro Kart	Uka Uka (original: Clancy Brown)	PlayStation 2, Xbox, GameCube	
2004	Dragon Quest VIII	Rhapthorne	PlayStation 2	
2004	Shadow Hearts II	Grigori Rasputin	PlayStation 2	
2004	Crash Twinsanity	Uka Uka (original: Alex Fernandez)	PlayStation 2, Xbox	
2004	Super Robot Wars GC	Ganan, Emperor Warusa	GameCube	
2004	Dragon Ball Z: Budokai 2	Dabra	PlayStation 2, GameCube	
2005	Dragon Ball Z: Budokai 3	Dabra	PlayStation 2	
2005	Dragon Ball Z: Budokai Tenkaichi|	Dabra		
2005	Tales of Legendia	Maurits, Nerifes		
2005	Shadow the Hedgehog	Black Doom	GameCube, PlayStation 2, Xbox	
2005	Soulcalibur III	Astaroth	PlayStation 2, Arcade	
2006	Final Fantasy XII	Judge Magister Zargabaath	PlayStation 2	
2006	Ace Combat Zero: The Belkan War	Captain Dominic "Vulture" Zubov	PlayStation 2	
2006	Dragon Ball Z: Budokai Tenkaichi 2|	Dabra	Wii, PlayStation 2	
2007	Dragon Ball Z: Budokai Tenkaichi 3|	Dabra	Wii, PlayStation 2	
2007	Soulcalibur Legends	Astaroth Alpha	Wii	
2007	Ace Combat 6: Fires of Liberation	Ghost Eye	Xbox 360	
2007	Dynasty Warriors: Gundam	Musha Gundam	PlayStation 2, PlayStation 3, Xbox 360	
2007	Initial D Arcade Stage 4	Kōzō Hoshino	Arcade	
2008	Warriors Orochi 2	Taira no Kiyomori, Shingen Takeda	PlayStation 2, Xbox 360, PlayStation Portable	
2008	Super Robot Wars A Portable	Ganan	PlayStation Portable	
2008	The Last Remnant	The Conqueror	Windows, Xbox 360	
2008	Ninja Gaiden 2	Genshin	Xbox 360	
2008	Klonoa	Ghadius	Wii	
2008	Soulcalibur IV	Astaroth	PlayStation 3, Xbox 360	
2009	Soulcalibur: Broken Destiny	Astaroth	PlayStation Portable	
2009	Musou Orochi Z	Taira no Kiyomori, Shingen Takeda	PlayStation 3, Windows	
2009	Samurai Warriors 3 Xtreme Legend	Shingen Takeda	PlayStation 3, PlayStation Portable, Wii	
2009–2013	League of Legends	Cho'Gath, Thresh	Windows, Mac	
2011	Warriors Orochi 3	Taira no Kiyomori, Shingen Takeda	PlayStation 3, Xbox 360	
2011	Tales of Xillia	Jiao		
2012	Tales of Xillia 2	Jiao	PlayStation 3	
2012	Soulcalibur V	Astaroth	PlayStation 3, Xbox 360	
2012	Kid Icarus: Uprising	Poseidon	Nintendo 3DS	
2012	One Piece: Pirate Warriors	Crocodile	PlayStation 3	
2013	One Piece: Pirate Warriors 2	Crocodile	PlayStation 3, PlayStation Vita	
2013	JoJo's Bizarre Adventure: All Star Battle	Cameo	PlayStation 3	
2014	Granblue Fantasy	Alanaan	Android, IOS, online	
2014	Samurai Warriors 4	Shingen Takeda	PlayStation 3, PlayStation 4, PlayStation Vita	
2015	One Piece: Pirate Warriors 3	Crocodile	PlayStation 3, PlayStation 4, PlayStation Vita, Windows	
2015	Samurai Warriors 4 II	Shingen Takeda	PlayStation 3, PlayStation 4, PlayStation Vita	
2016	Samurai Warriors: Spirit of Sanada	Shingen Takeda	PlayStation 3, PlayStation 4, PlayStation Vita	
2018	Soulcalibur VI	Astaroth	Windows, PlayStation 4, Xbox One	
2018	Super Robot Wars X	Schwarvenegger	PlayStation 4, PlayStation Vita	
2020	One Piece: Pirate Warriors 4	Crocodile	Nintendo Switch, PlayStation 4, Windows, Xbox One	

=== Drama CDs ===
Year	Title	Role	Refs
2003	Bad Boys!	Rikiya Hodate	

=== Dubbing roles ===
==== Live-action ====
Original Year	Title	Role	Original actor	Notes	Refs
1981	Das Boot	Ario	Claude-Oliver Rudolph	DVD edition	
1981	Mad Max 2	Wez	Vernon Wells	1991 TBS edition	
1984	The Terminator	T-800	Arnold Schwarzenegger	1987 TV Asahi and 1992 VHS editions	
1986	Highlander	The Kurgan/Victor Kruger	Clancy Brown	1988 TV Asahi edition	
1986	Cobra	The Night Slasher	Brian Thompson	1994 TV Asahi edition	
1986	Aliens	Private Mark Drake	Mark Rolston	1993 TV Asahi Special Edition	
1987	Predator	Billy, Predator	Sonny Landham, Kevin Peter Hall	1993 TV Asahi Special Edition	
1989	Cyborg	Fender Tremolo	Vincent Klyn	1991 TV Asahi edition	
1989	Major League	Pedro	Dennis Haysbert	VHS/DVD edition	
1990	Predator 2	King Willie	Calvin Lockhart	1994 TV Asahi edition	
1992	Alien 3	Edward Boggs	Leon Herbert	1998 TV Asahi version	
1992	Trespass	Savon	Ice Cube		
1993	The Saint of Fort Washington	Little Leroy	Ving Rhames		
1993	Dave	Duane Stevenson	Ving Rhames		
1993	Romeo Is Bleeding	Sal	Michael Wincott		
1994	The Crow	Top Dollar	Michael Wincott	1997 TV Tokyo edition	
1994	The Crow	Grange	Tony Todd		
1994	Street Fighter	Zangief	Andrew Bryniarski	1997 TV Asahi edition	
1994	Timecop	Cole	Richard Faraci	1996 TV Asahi edition	
1995	Cutthroat Island	Mr. Glasspool	Stan Shaw		
1995	Tom and Huck	Injun Joe	Eric Schweig		
1995	Heat	Trejo	Danny Trejo	1998 TV Asahi edition	
1995	Die Hard with a Vengeance	Otto	Richard E. Council	1998 Fuji TV edition	
1996	The Glimmer Man	Donald Cunningham	John M. Jackson	DVD edition	
1996	Goosebumps	Death		Episode: "Say Cheese and Die - Again!"	
1997	Metro	Michael Korda	Michael Wincott		
1997	Amistad	Sengbe Pieh / Joseph Cinqué	Djimon Hounsou		
1997	Alien Resurrection	Johner	Ron Perlman	VHS/DVD edition	
1997	Men in Black	Edgar the Bug	Vincent D'Onofrio	VHS/DVD edition	
1997	Con Air	Nathan "Diamond Dog" Jones	Ving Rhames		
1997	Batman & Robin	Mr. Freeze	Arnold Schwarzenegger		
1997	Double Team	Yaz	Dennis Rodman		
1998	Mercury Rising	Peter Burrell	L. L. Ginter	DVD edition	
1998	Rush Hour	Luke	Clifton Powell		
1998	Six Days Seven Nights	Jager	Temuera Morrison	VHS/DVD edition	
1998	The Replacement Killers	Michael Kogan	Jürgen Prochnow		
1998–1999	Soldier of Fortune, Inc.	Deacon 'Deke' Reynolds	Dennis Rodman		
1999	Dogma	Metatron	Alan Rickman		
1999	The Mummy	High Priest Imhotep	Arnold Vosloo		
1999	Payback	Bronson	Kris Kristofferson	Video and DVD edition	
1999	The Green Mile	John Coffey	Michael Clarke Duncan		
2000	Ordinary Decent Criminal	Noel Quigley	Stephen Dillane		
2001	Snow White: The Fairest of Them All	Granter of Wishes	Clancy Brown		
2001	Joy Ride	Rusty Nail	Ted Levine	DVD edition	
2001	The Mummy Returns	High Priest Imhotep	Arnold Vosloo	Fuji TV edition	
2002	Eight Legged Freaks	Leon	Jay Arlen Jones	2008 TV Tokyo edition	
2002	Men in Black II	Pineal Eye	William E. Jackson	VHS/DVD edition	
2002	Resident Evil	One	Colin Salmon	VHS/DVD edition	
2003	Pirates of the Caribbean: The Curse of the Black Pearl	Bo'sun	Isaac C. Singleton Jr.		
2003	Daredevil	Kingpin	Michael Clarke Duncan		
2006	Casino Royale	Steven Obanno	Isaach de Bankolé	2009 TV Asahi edition	
2006	Lost	Kelvin Joe Inman	Clancy Brown		
2008	10,000 BC	Warlord	Affif Ben Badra	2011 TV Asahi edition	
2008	Get Smart	Dalip	Dalip Singh	2011 TV Asahi edition	
2008	The Andromeda Strain	General George Mancheck	Andre Braugher		
2008	Cadillac Records	Howlin' Wolf	Eamonn Walker		
2008	The Dark Knight	Gambol	Michael Jai White	2012 TV Asahi edition	
2009	Underworld: Rise of the Lycans	Raze	Kevin Grevioux		
2010	Alice in Wonderland	Blue Caterpillar	Alan Rickman		
2011	Conan the Barbarian	Corin	Ron Perlman		
2012	The Hobbit: An Unexpected Journey	Smaug	Benedict Cumberbatch		
2013	The Hobbit: The Desolation of Smaug	Smaug	Benedict Cumberbatch		
2013	Ender's Game	Admiral Chjamrajnagar	Tony Mirrcandani		
2013	Company of Heroes	Brent Willoughby	Vinnie Jones		
2014	The Hobbit: The Battle of the Five Armies	Smaug	Benedict Cumberbatch		
2014	Transformers: Age of Extinction	Galvatron	Frank Welker		
2015	Point Break	FBI Instructor Hall	Delroy Lindo		
2016	Fantastic Beasts and Where to Find Them	Gnarlak	Ron Perlman		

==== Western animation ====
Original Year	Title	Role	Original actor	Notes	Refs
1987	Teenage Mutant Ninja Turtles	Rat King, Chakahachi	Townsend Coleman, Pat Fraley	TV Tokyo edition	
1987	Teenage Mutant Ninja Turtles	Leatherhead	Jim Cummings	BS2 edition	
1987–1988	DuckTales	Armstrong	Peter Cullen		
1992–1997	X-Men	Magneto	David Hemblen	TV Tokyo edition	
1993–1996	Biker Mice from Mars	Lord Camembert	Jeff Bennett		
1995	Iron Man	Nick Fury	Philip Abbott		
1997	Cats Don't Dance	Max	Mark Dindal		
1997	Hercules	Nessus	Jim Cummings		
1998	Toonsylvania	Phil	Brad Garrett		
2002	Treasure Planet	Scroop	Michael Wincott		
2003	Spider-Man: The New Animated Series	Kingpin	Michael Clarke Duncan		
2004	Home on the Range	Rico the Bounty Hunter	Charles Dennis		
2008	Delgo	Elder Marley	Michael Clarke Duncan		
2011	Star Wars: The Clone Wars	Kindalo	Dee Bradley Baker		
2013–2017	Uncle Grandpa	Mr. Gus	Kevin Michael Richardson		
2015	Steven Universe	Mr. Gus	Kevin Michael Richardson		

=== Tokusatsu ===
Year	Title	Role	Notes	Refs
1992	Kyoryu Sentai Zyuranger	Skeleton rickshaw driver	Episodes 40 - 42	
1994	Ninja Sentai Kakuranger	Noppera-bō	Episode 39	
1996	Choukou Senshi Changerion	Darkness General Zhender/Kazuki Katayama (original: Yutaka Hirose)		
1996	B-Fighter Kabuto	Astral Saber		
1997	Denji Sentai Megaranger	Javius the First (Voice), Research staff (Actor)		
1998	Seijuu Sentai Gingaman	Dotoumusha	Episodes 22 - 23	
2000	Kyuukyuu Sentai GoGoFive vs Gingaman	Darkness King Gill (voice)		
2000	Mirai Sentai Timeranger	Don Dolnero/Douzan Kinjou (original: Kihee Senbonmatsu)	Douzan, episodes 2 - 39; Don, episodes 1 - 47	
2004	Tokusou Sentai Dekaranger	Ginjifuan Kazak		
2007	Juken Sentai Gekiranger	Gorie Yen	Episodes 20 - 49	
2008	Ultraman Mebius: The Armored Darkness	Armored Darkness		
2008	Superior Ultraman 8 Brothers	Super Alien Hipporito		
2009	Kamen Rider Decade	Ayakashi Chinomanako/Chinomanako Diend	Episodes 24 - 25	
2010	Tomica Hero Rescue Fire	Donkaen	Episodes 48 - 51	
2010	Tensou Sentai Goseiger	Yuumajuu Giemurou of the Kappa	Episode 19	
2011	Kamen Rider OOO Wonderful: The Shogun and the 21 Core Medals	Gara (Monster form)		
2012	Garo: Makai Senki	Gajari (voice)	Episodes 14 - 24	
2012	Kamen Rider Wizard	Wizardragon (voice)	Episodes 9, 31, 51	
2013	Kamen Rider × Kamen Rider Gaim & Wizard: The Fateful Sengoku Movie Battle	Wizardragon (voice)		

=== Other roles ===
Year	Title	Role	Notes	Refs
2008	Dragon Ball Z Infinite World	PV		
2008	Sengoku Raiden Championship	VTR Narration	Sengoku ~Daigojin~	
Unknown	Hamlet	Marcellus		
