= Chō =

Japanese voice actor and narrator (born 1957)

- チョー
- Born: Shigeru Nagashima (長島 茂); December 15, 1957 (age 68); Kōnosu, Saitama Prefecture, Japan
- Other name: Yūichi Nagashima (長島 雄一)
- Occupations: Actor; voice actor; narrator
- Years active: 1984–present
- Agent: Haikyō
- Website: ameblo.jp/chosans/

Chō (チョー; born Shigeru Nagashima (長島 茂, Nagashima Shigeru), December 15, 1957) is a Japanese actor and narrator. His former stage name was Yūichi Nagashima (長島 雄一, Nagashima Yūichi). He is a graduate of the Nishogakusha University Department of Literature and received training at Bungakuza's research establishment and the Seinenza Theater Company before attaching himself to Production Baobab in 1986. He transferred to the Tokyo Actor's Consumer's Cooperative Society in 2007. On August 23, 2006, he changed his stage name to Chō after his character in Tanken Boku no Machi. His hobbies include badminton and jogging, and he is a licensed teacher in calligraphy.

== Filmography ==
=== Television animation ===
1989

- Time Travel Tondekeman (Pilot, Bronze Statue)

1990

- Kyatto Ninden Teyandee (Himawari #2, Yongō Sasanishiki, Piddo #9, Missile Yachōbee, Buffalo #10, Ishikari #2)
- Chibi Maruko-chan (Fujiki's Father)

1992

- Floral Magician Mary Bell (Noppo)
- Mikan Enikki (Momojirō)
- Uchū no Kishi Tekkaman Blade (Sakuaari Staff Officer, Guerilla Soldier)

1993

- The Brave Express Might Gaine (Sally and Tetsuya's Father)

1994

- Brave Police J-Decker (Doctor Volker)
- Haō Taikei Ryū Knight (Izumi's Teacher, Grandpa Rōbā)
- Kyōfu no Kyō-chan (Downtown no Gottsu Ee Kanji) (AD, Nagisa Ōshima, Saburō Kitajima)
- Mahōjin Guru Guru (Wanchin, Sāchiai, Merchant)
- Montana Jones (Slam)

1995

- Jūsenshi Garukiiba (Edward Takasaki, Da Raku)
- Mama ha Poyopoyo-Saurus ga Osuki (Genta Yasuyota)
- The Brave of Gold Goldran (Older Brother, Detective)
- Ike! Inachū Takkyū-bu (Shibazaki, Nakata, Hashino, Kayama, Inobuta, Shiomura)
- Shima Shima Tora no Shimajirō (Trump King)

1996

- Baketsu Degohan (Ochichi-chan, Guttenberg, Yamada-chan)
- Doraemon (Old Guy #A)
- Detective Conan (Policeman)
- Nintama Rantarō (Lord Mannentake, Dumpling Merchant, Travelling Gentleman, Daisuke Tai)
- YAT Anshin! Uchū Ryokō (Hachibe)

1998

- Kindaichi Case Files (Gorō Itami, Heisuke Kindaichi, Shimon Madarame)
- Nintama Rantarō (Master)
- Sexy Commando Gaiden: Sugoiyo!! Masaru-san (Tsuyoshi Isobe (Kyasharin), Vice Principal)
- Weiß Kreuz (Hiroshi Kondō)
- Flame of Recca (Kashamaru)

1999

- Bubu Chacha (Chacha)
- Excel Saga (Old Man)
- Great Teacher Onizuka (Vice Principal Hiroshi Uchiyamada)
- Nintama Rantarō (Akahige)
- Tenshi ni Naromon! (Alien #C)
- Zoids (Gustav's Chauffeur)

2000

- Inuyasha (Jaken)
- Gensomaden Saiyuki (Fake Goku)
- Kindaichi Shōnen no Jikenbo (Jurisdiction Detective)
- Invincible King Tri-Zenon (Gontarō Shini)
- Oh! Super Milk-chan (The President)

2001

- A-kuei Family (Great Devil King)
- Crayon Shin-chan (Ginnosuke Nohara (second voice), Gen-san, Morokōshi)
- Cyborg 009: The Cyborg Soldier (007/Great Britain)
- Nintama Rantarō (Nizaemon Tsukuda (second voice))
- Rave (Gurein Muzika)
- Zoids Shin Seiki Slash Zero (Doctor Layon)

2002

- Digimon Frontier (Nanomon)
- One Piece (Barbarossa)

2003

- Astro Boy: Tetsuwan Atom (Ham Egg)
- F-Zero: Falcon Densetsu (Super Arrow)
- Gunslinger Girl (Mario Bosshi (episode 4))
- Konjiki no Gash Bell!! (Shop Manager)
- One Piece (Henzō)

2004

- A-kuei to Gacchinpō (Great Devil King)
- Monster (Ehon Mania)
- Samurai Champloo (Hendai)
- Transformers Super Link (Alpha Q)

2005

- A-kuei to Gacchinpō: Tenkomori (Great Devil King)
- Bleach (Makizō Aramaki)
- Gallery Fake (Morito Chinen)
- Keroro Gunsō (Dasonu Man, Mekeke)
- Kōchū Ōja Mushiking: Mori no Tami no Densetsu (Pasaa)
- Kōkyōshihen Eureka Seven (Woz)
- Pocket Monsters Advanced Generation (Gordon)
- Yu-Gi-Oh! Duel Monsters GX (Professor Kabayama/Curry Mask, Guard of the Underworld)

2006

- Digimon Savers (Hiroshi Yushima)
- Galaxy Angel Rune (Mayor Dalton, Chief Kobayashi)
- Meitantei Conan (Jisshō Hasegawa)
- Naruto (Hakkaku)
- Negima!? (Yamada)
- Ōran Kōkō Host Club (Misuzu Sonoda)
- Pumpkin Scissors (Captain Hunks)
- XxxHolic (Kei) (Karasu-Tengu)
- Da Capo II (Asakura Jun'ichi)

2007

- Blue Dragon (Hippopotamus)
- Dragonaut: The Resonance (Kiriru Jajiefu)
- Hidamari Sketch (High School Principal)
- Keroro Gunsō (Mekeke)
- Meitantei Conan (Police Inspector)
- Shigurui (Narrator)
- Wellber no Monogatari ~Sisters of Wellber~ (Cyrano de Bergerac)

2008

- Blue Dragon: Tenkai no Shichitatsu (Hippopotamus)
- Gunslinger Girl -Il Teatrino- (Mario Bosshi)
- Hidamari Sketch x365 (High School Principal)
- One Piece (Brook, Ryuma)
- Wellber no Monogatari ~Sisters of Wellber~: Dainimaku (Cyrano de Bergerac)
- Kaiba (Patch)
- xxxHolic: Kei (Karasutengu "Keith")

2009

- InuYasha: The Final Act (Jaken)
- Marie & Gali (Galileo)
- Natsume's Book of Friends (Chobihige)
- Pandora Hearts (Duke Barma Fake Body)

2010

- Arakawa Under the Bridge*2 (Terumasa Takai)
- Bakuman (Fumio Mashiro)
- Digimon Xros Wars (Pharaohmon)
- Heroman (Matthew Denton)
- Hidamari Sketch x Hoshimittsu (High School Principal)
- Marie & Gali ver. 2.0 (Galileo)
- Nurarihyon no Mago (Sodemogi-Sama)
- Tegami Bachi ~Reverse~ (Autobahn)

2011

- Gyakkyō Burai Kaiji: Hakairoku-hen (Ōtsuki)
- Hanasaku Iroha (Denroku Sukegawa)
- Hidamari Sketch x SP (High School Principal)
- Lotte no Omocha! (Olav Friðmar)
- Nekogami Yaoyorozu (Shikigami leader)
- Nichijou (Principal)
- One Piece (Sabo's father, Fake Franky)
- Tiger & Bunny (Massini)

2012

- Hidamari Sketch x Honeycomb (High School Principal)
- Space Battleship Yamato 2199 (Analyzer Unit 09, Guelf Ganz, Sukeji Yabu)

2013

- Toriko (Munage)
- Magi: The Kingdom of Magic (Matal Mogamett)
- Naruto: Shippuden (Chen)
- Hunter × Hunter (2011) (Bonolenov)

2014

- Momo Kyun Sword (Sacred Peach's Keeper in Episode 2 and Youki)
- The Seven Deadly Sins (Golgius)

2015

- Gate: Jieitai Kanochi nite, Kaku Tatakaeri (Kato El Altestan)
- JoJo's Bizarre Adventure: Stardust Crusaders (Wilson Phillips)
- One Piece (Maujii)
- Rampo Kitan: Game of Laplace (Nakamura)
- Garo: Crimson Moon (Goruba)

2016

- KonoSuba (Professor)

2018

- Mr. Tonegawa: Middle Management Blues (Ōtsuki, Zawa Voice (009))
- Overlord III (Parpatra Ogrion)
- The Seven Deadly Sins: Revival of the Commandments (Golgius)
- Black Clover (Gifso/High Priest)

2019

- Kengan Ashura (Kazuo Yamashita)

2020

- Listeners (McGee)
- Boruto: Naruto Next Generations (Victor)
- Akudama Drive (Shark)

2021

- Dragon Goes House-Hunting (Leprechaun)
- The Idaten Deities Know Only Peace (Ōpami)
- Yashahime: Princess Half-Demon (Jaken)

2023

- Handyman Saitō in Another World (Morlock)
- Hell's Paradise: Jigokuraku (Hōko)
- Mashle: Magic and Muscles (Regro Burnedead)
- Under Ninja (Ōno)

2024

- Brave Bang Bravern! (Bob Craib)
- The Apothecary Diaries (Shishou)
- Urusei Yatsura (Upa)
- The Strongest Magician in the Demon Lord's Army Was a Human (Romberg)
- Ranma ½ (Genma Saotome)
- Frieren (Old Man)

2025

- Apocalypse Hotel (Bumbuku)

2026

- Nippon Sangoku (Jiro Musashikami)
- I Became a Legend After My 10 Year-Long Last Stand (Gerberga)

=== OVA/ONA ===
- Animation Runner Kuromi (2001) (Nonki Hayama)
- Demon Prince Enma (2006) (Grandfather Shapo)
- Darker than Black (2008) (Contractor)
- One-Punch Man OVA (2015) (The Clothes-shop Owner)
- Cute Executive Officer (2021) (Konpota-ojisan (Mr. Corn Potage))
- JoJo's Bizarre Adventure: Stone Ocean (2022) (Dragon's Dream)
- Star Wars: Visions Presents – The Ninth Jedi (2026) (Gramps)

=== Theatrical animation ===
- Sword of the Stranger (2007) (Gohei)
- One Piece Film: Strong World (2009) (Brook)
- Redline (2009) (Various voices)
- A Letter to Momo (2011) (Mame)
- Space Battleship Yamato 2199 (2012-2013) (Analyzer Unit 09/Sukeji Yabu/Guelf Ganz)
- One Piece Film: Z (2013) (Brook)
- Harmony (2015) (Keita Saeki)
- One Piece Film: Gold (2016) (Brook)
- Natsume's Book of Friends The Movie: Ephemeral Bond (2018) (Chobihige)
- Batman Ninja (2018) (Penguin)
- One Piece: Stampede (2019) (Brook)
- KonoSuba: God's Blessing on this Wonderful World! Legend of Crimson (2019) (Professor)
- Natsume's Book of Friends: The Waking Rock and the Strange Visitor (2021) (Chobihige)
- Sand Land (2023) (Thief)
- Mononoke Second Chapter: Hinezumi (2025) (Yoshimichi Tokita)

=== Video games ===
- 2nd Super Robot Wars Original Generation (????) (Zebris Forschwa)
- Legend of the Holy Sword 4 (????) (Watts)
- Magical Drop III (1997) (Magician)
- Mana-Khemia: Alchemists of Al-Revis (????) (Muppy Oktavia Vondercheck VIII)
- Puyo Puyo~n (1999) (Suketoudara)
- Inuyasha (Jaken) (2001)
- Ratchet & Clank (????) (Novalis Mayor)
- Rockman ZX Advent (2007) (Master Mikhail)
- Sonic World Adventure (2008) (Professor Pickle)
- Tales of Vesperia (2008) (Hanks)
- True Crime: Streets of LA (????) (Ancient Wu)
- One Piece: Pirate Warriors 3 (2015) (Brook)
- Shin Megami Tensei: Strange Journey Redux (2017) (Three Wise Men)
- Xenoblade Chronicles 2 (2017) (Tatazo)
- Granblue Fantasy (2014) (Estarriola)
- Ninjala (2020) (Genryusai)
- Genshin Impact (2020) (Pulcinella)
- One Piece Odyssey (2023) (Brook)
- Resident Evil 4 (2023) (Ramon Salazar)

=== Dubbing roles ===
==== Live-action ====
- Andy Serkis
  - The Lord of the Rings film trilogy (Gollum)
  - Rise of the Planet of the Apes (Caesar)
  - The Adventures of Tintin (Captain Haddock)
- The Adventures of Rocky and Bullwinkle (Narrator)
- Air Force One (Major Caldwell (William H. Macy))
- Ali (Drew Bundini Brown (Jamie Foxx))
- Bewitched (Uncle Arthur (Steve Carell))
- Billy Madison (Brian Madison (Darren McGavin))
- Charade (2004 DVD edition) (Carson Dyle (Walter Matthau))
- Charlie's Angels (Additional voice)
- The Chronicles of Narnia: Prince Caspian (Trufflehunter the Badger (Ken Stott))
- Das Boot (2004 TV Tokyo edition) (2nd Watch Officer (Martin Semmelrogge))
- Daylight (2000 TV Asahi edition) (George Tyrell (Stan Shaw))
- Devil in a Blue Dress (Joppy (Mel Winkler))
- Die Hard with a Vengeance (1999 TV Asahi edition) (FBI Chief)
- DodgeBall: A True Underdog Story (Dwight (Chris Williams))
- The Fall Guy (Doone)
- Friends (Joey's Father (Robert Costanzo))
- From Russia with Love (Ali Kerim Bey (Pedro Armendáriz))
- Gentlemen Broncos (Lonnie Donaho (Héctor Jiménez))
- Ghostbusters II (1998 TV Asahi edition) (Winston Zeddemore (Ernie Hudson))
- Gremlins 2: The New Batch (Mohawk Gremlin)
- Happy Gilmore (Bob Barker)
- Henry Fool (Simon Grim (James Urbaniak))
- The Island (Jones Three-Echo (Ethan Phillips))
- Joy Ride (Sheriff Ritter (Jim Beaver))
- The Legend (Hyeongo (Oh Kwang-rok))
- The Legend of 1900 (Danny (Bill Nunn))
- The Man in the Iron Mask (Lieutenant Andre (Edward Atterton))
- Memphis Belle (Sergeant Jack Bocci (Neil Giuntoli))
- Naked Gun 33 1/3: The Final Insult (James Earl Jones)
- Navy SEALs (1993 TV Asahi edition) (Ramos)
- Roman Holiday (2022 NTV edition) (Taxi Driver (Alfredo Rizzo))
- Scooby-Doo (Scooby-Doo)
- The Sound of Music (2011 TV Tokyo edition) (Max Detweiler (Richard Haydn))
- Space Jam (Larry Johnson)
- Speed (1998 TV Asahi edition) (Ortiz (Carlos Carrasco))
- The Spiderwick Chronicles (Thimbletack (Martin Short))
- Star Trek: Voyager (Neelix (Ethan Phillips))
- Street Fighter (Don Sauvage (Eric André))
- Tequila and Bonetti (Officer Vita)
- Transformers film series (Reggie Simmons (John Turturro))
- Unfaithful (2006 TV Asahi edition) (Detective Dean (Željko Ivanek))
- Volcano (Announcer)
- Wild Wild West (Hudson (Rodney A. Grant))

==== Animation ====
- The Batman (Toymaker)
- Beast Wars (Tarantulas)
- Beast Machines (Savage/Noble)
- The Boss Baby (DVD edition) (Boss Baby)
- Coco (Clerk)
- Corpse Bride (Maggot)
- Courage the Cowardly Dog (William the Water Dragon)
- Dave the Barbarian (The Dark Lord Chuckles the Silly Piggy)
- House of Mouse (Ranger J. Audubon Woodlore, Prince John)
- Finding Dory (Rudder)
- Hotel Transylvania series (Frank)
- I Am Weasel (I.R. Baboon (second voice))
- Jackie Chan Adventures (Jumba)
- Legends of Oz: Dorothy's Return (Jester)
- Looney Tunes (Elmer Fudd)
- Madagascar (Mason the Chimpanzee)
- Madagascar: Escape 2 Africa (Mason the Chimpanzee)
- Madagascar 3: Europe's Most Wanted (Mason the Chimpanzee)
- ReBoot (Cecil)
- Shirt Tales (Bogey Orangutan)
- Space Jam (Elmer Fudd, Barnyard Dog)
- Space Jam: A New Legacy (Elmer Fudd)
- Spider-Man Unlimited (Green Goblin)
- The SpongeBob SquarePants Movie (Sheldon J. Plankton)
- Transformers Animated (Blitzwing)

=== Live-action ===
- Inai Inai Baa! (1996) (Wanwan, Voice and actor)
- Dokuganryū Masamune (????) (Utai)
- Tanken Boku no Machi (????) (Chō-san)
- Kono Machi Daisuki (????) (Ace no Chō, Chōsuke Hoshi)
- Samurai Sentai Shinkenger (2009) (Shitari of the Bones (eps. 1 - 20, 22 - 31, 33 - 42, 44 - 49))
- Kamen Rider Decade (2009) (Shitari of the Bones (ep. 24)
- Samurai Sentai Shinkenger The Movie: The Fateful War (2009) (Shitari of the Bones)
- Samurai Sentai Shinkenger vs. Go-onger: GinmakuBang!! (2010) (Shitari of the Bones)
- Samurai Sentai Shinkenger Returns (2010) (Drunk with a squid)
- Tensou Sentai Goseiger vs. Shinkenger: Epic on Ginmaku (2011) (Shitari of the Bones)
- Kaizoku Sentai Gokaiger (2011) (Shitari of the Bones (ep. 40))
- Zyuden Sentai Kyoryuger (2013) (Debo Yanasanta (ep. 41 - 42))
- Zyuden Sentai Kyoryuger Returns: Hundred Years After (2014) (Debo Yunudamonne)
- Ressha Sentai ToQger (2014) (Hammer Shadow (ep. 15 - 16))
- Shuriken Sentai Ninninger (2015) (Youkai Ungaikyō (ep. 5))
- Daimajin Kanon (2010) (Tōbee)
- Doubutsu Sentai Zyuohger (2016) (Narration, Zyuohger Equipment Voice, Cetus (ep. 28))

== Awards ==
Year	Award	Category	Result
2018	12th Seiyu Awards	Kei Tomiyama Memorial Award	Won
