= Warriors: Abyss =

2025 video game

- Cover art for Warriors: Abyss
- Developer: Omega Force
- Publisher: Koei Tecmo
- Series: Warriors
- Platforms: Nintendo Switch; PlayStation 4; PlayStation 5; Windows; Xbox Series X/S
- Release: PlayStation 4, PlayStation 5, Windows, Xbox Series X/S; February 12, 2025; Nintendo Switch; February 14, 2025
- Genres: Roguelite, hack and slash
- Mode: Single-player

Trademark characteristics of the Warriors series are notably present in Warriors: Abyss, in particular the large enemy hordes, and powerful and flashy player attacks.

Warriors: Abyss is a roguelite hack and slash game developed by Omega Force and published by Koei Tecmo. It is a spinoff from the Warriors video game series and was released in 2025 for Windows, PlayStation 4, PlayStation 5 and Xbox Series X/S, with a Nintendo Switch version following two days later. Enma, king of Hell, summons the player to help reclaim his throne after it was taken over by an ancient evil.

As one of hundreds of playable characters, the player fights through several rooms of a stage with hordes of enemies, culminating in a boss battle at the end of each stage. They collect several upgrades and recruit additional heroes to get stronger over the course of a run. Permanent upgrades may also be achieved outside of a run, along with the ability to unlock new characters to use.

The producer conceived of the concept some time after work was complete on the 2023 video game Wild Hearts as he wanted to work on a roguelite game. While he wasn't confident in it at first, it was improved and fleshed out over time, ultimately becoming Warriors: Abyss, releasing in early 2025.

Warriors: Abyss received mixed reviews, with reviewers generally appreciating the feel of combat, but criticizing the game for a lack of creativity and poor story. Character amount and design was often praised, but some critics had frustrations with the game's bosses.

== Gameplay ==
In Warriors: Abyss, the player takes control of a character from a bird's-eye view to battle against enemy hordes in Hell. The king of Hell, Enma, summons the player there to help him reclaim the throne, after it was usurped by an evil named Gouma. Usually, a set number of enemies must be defeated in each wave, after which the player may advance to the next arena. Throughout a run, the player may choose "emblems", which provide passive bonuses, with stronger effects as more of the same type are gathered. After each wave, the player is offered upgrades, including items or the recruitment of additional warriors. While more than six heroes may be recruited at once, only six heroes may be in the main party; these heroes can be summoned individually to attack, whereas reserves only provide passive bonuses. A stage consists of eight tiers which are random in layout with objectives in standard roguelite fashion; some tiers may also include an extra objective on top of the standard goal. After fighting through seven tiers, the eighth and final tier of each of the four stages always consists of a boss battle against a strong opponent, whose guard meter must be depleted through attacks before a window to deal damage is given.

The game has more than 100 playable characters from Dynasty Warriors, Samurai Warriors, and Warriors Orochi, though not all are unlocked from the start. Each character has an associated weapon that determines the available attack combinations, consisting of chains of light and heavy attacks. The player may activate a "Musou" ability after filling the "Musou gauge" through combat, unleashing a large, powerful attack unique to the character. Also unique to each character are "Unique Tactics", which are passive bonuses that activate upon fulfilling certain conditions, such as defeating a number of enemies with a certain element. A separate "Assemble gauge" can be filled once six heroes are recruited, which when full, lets the player deploy all main party recruits at once to simultaneously attack the hordes. Characters gain levels through gameplay, which gives them permanent bonuses to their attack and defense capabilities.

== Development ==
The concept of Warriors: Abyss was conceived some time after work finished on Omega Force's Wild Hearts. Producer Kotaro Hirata felt that there was a lack of Japanese roguelite games despite the global appeal of the genre, and originally wished to present a pitch for a roguelite concept, having wanted to work with the format for a while. However, he did not feel like it would be appealing enough alone to be a successful pitch. Eventually, he became more confident in it as it was fleshed out and as he realized the compatibility with the roguelite genre and the Warriors style of gameplay, and it was greenlit for production. In turn, it was partially designed with the intention of introducing players that were not familiar with action roguelite games, with the inclusion of simplistic controls and strategic advice/assistance systems.

The game was announced on February 12, 2025 during Sony's State of Play and released on the same day for Windows, PlayStation 4, PlayStation 5, and Xbox Series X/S, with the Nintendo Switch version following on February 14, 2025. It continued to receive free major content updates months later, including several additional characters from Koei Tecmo's Ninja Gaiden and Atelier series.

== Reception ==
Reception

Aggregate scores
Aggregator	Score
Metacritic	(PC) 68/100 (PS5) 68/100 (XSXS) 67/100
OpenCritic	47% recommended

Review scores
Publication	Score
IGN	7/10
Nintendo Life	6/10
Shacknews	7/10

Warriors: Abyss received "mixed or average" reviews by critics on Windows, PlayStation 5, and Xbox Series X/S, according to the review aggregator website Metacritic. Reviewers commonly praised the combat, along with roster size and build variety, but criticized the story, visuals, repetitive progression, and boss fights. Checkpoint Gaming said the game recontextualized standard Warriors gameplay to a roguelike (Note: While the game's producer describes the game as a 'roguelite', some still choose to use the term 'roguelike', as the 'roguelite' genre is sometimes seen as a sub-genre rather than something wholly distinct. 'Roguelike' is used here to align more closely to the source.) format effectively, referring to it as "thoroughly enjoyable, even if it's a bit boilerplate." While Nintendo Life found that some aspects were sub-par, there was enough to keep them interested for some time, with Siliconera agreeing that the game could've done better in some areas despite having a "solid foundation". Particularly when comparing it to other games in the series or other roguelikes in general, The Jimquisition found it hard to recommend.

Several reviewers criticized the story as unengaging. Both Nintendo Life and Checkpoint Gaming called the plot "paper-thin" and Siliconera dubbed it as "dull", left underwhelmed by meaningless player choices in dialogue. Similarly, IGN never felt a connection with the story, attributing the sentiment to the large volume of characters who all had similar dialogue options, meaning no character stood out from the others.

The size and variety of the character roster were often praised, as seen in Shacknews' review, remarking on the "impressive" amount of distinct moves despite the minimal gameplay and controls. To Digitally Downloaded, part of the game's fun was unlocking and testing out new characters from the large roster, even after the reviewer had already unlocked their favorites from the series. The Jimquisition pointed out the universal power boost obtained upon unlocking characters, which to them made unlocks feel "rewarding in both a specific and general sense at once." Although IGN didn't feel many differences between characters, they still cited the large roster as the strongest part of the game, along with enjoying the variety in builds across runs.

While visuals of the game were noted as a weak point by GamingBolt and Nintendo Life, both saw practical benefits in the simple presentation. The former observed value in the readability; they acknowledged that the nature of the gameplay could lead to visual clarity issues with more intricate graphics, and appreciated that it was easy to understand what was happening. On the other hand, Nintendo Life saw the visuals as a potential compromise for performance, but were disappointed by uncreative level and enemy designs.

Some critics commented on the game's grind. Digitally Downloaded did notice a grind, but was able to look past it due to the enjoyable gameplay loop and swift runs, though Shacknews labelled the "super grindy" progression as a negative, and Nintendo Life felt the game becoming more repetitive after a few hours.

Some reviews disapproved of the game's boss fights. Both IGN and Siliconera noticed that bosses seemed to play out the same gameplay-wise, with IGN calling them "uninspired". Siliconera called them a "slog" and saw them as exhausting rather than challenging. Shacknews felt similar frustrations, with the fights getting in the way of the fun parts, expressing distaste for the overuse of area-of-effect attacks. Along with Siliconera, The Jimquisition instead pointed towards the barrier that must be depleted before dealing damage, calling it "tedious" at best and "disheartening" at worst when bosses are near death but protected.
