= One Piece: Pirate Warriors (video game) =

2012 video game

- European cover art
- Developer: Omega Force
- Publisher: Bandai Namco Games (Note: Released under the Bandai label)
- Director: Tomoyuki Kitamura
- Producers: Koji Nakajima; Hisashi Koinuma
- Designer: Takahiro Kawai
- Programmer: Hayato Iwata
- Series: One Piece: Pirate Warriors (One Piece)
- Platform: PlayStation 3
- Release: JP: March 1, 2012; EU: September 21, 2012; NA: September 25, 2012
- Genres: Action-adventure; Beat 'em up
- Modes: Single-player, multiplayer

One Piece: Pirate Warriors (Note: One Piece: Pirate Warriors (ONE PIECE(ワンピース) 海賊無双, Wan Pīsu: Kaizoku Musou)) is an action video game developed by Omega Force and published by Bandai Namco Games for PlayStation 3. It was released on March 1, 2012, in Japan, September 21, 2012, in Europe and September 25, 2012, in North America. The game was developed in commemoration of the 15th anniversary of the One Piece manga by Eiichiro Oda and its anime adaptation. Pirate Warriors was also the first title in the One Piece video game franchise which was released on a PlayStation system since One Piece: Grand Adventure in 2006.

As with the rest of the franchise, Pirate Warriors follows the adventures of Monkey D. Luffy, a young boy who accidentally eats the Gum-Gum Fruit and organizes a diverse crew of pirates called the Straw Hats to search for the titular treasure. On his journey, Luffy makes several new friends, and battles a wide variety of villains. A sequel, One Piece: Pirate Warriors 2, was released in March 2013.

== Gameplay ==
Pirate Warriors is an action game incorporating elements from both the Dynasty Warriors series and the One Piece series. The game's story mode, Main Log, allows the player to play through the storyline. The Adventure mode uses Luffy to play through the events of the One Piece series and the battle mode allows the player to use characters in battles. In Another Log, the player can play through a character's storyline. With it are several stories exclusive to the game.

== Characters ==
The game features a total of 13 playable characters. Other characters from the series also appear as non-playable enemies.

- Boa Hancock
- Brook
- Edward Newgate (Whitebeard)
- Franky
- Jimbei
- Monkey D. Luffy
- Nami
- Nico Robin
- Portgas D. Ace
- Roronoa Zoro
- Sanji
- Tony Tony Chopper
- Usopp

== Similarities ==
There are 16 chapters in Main Log mode. The cut-scenes were reused in One Piece: Pirate Warriors 3 and re-rendered in One Piece: Pirate Warriors 4.

== Development ==
The concept and development for Pirate Warriors began with a meeting between Tecmo Koei producer Hisashi Koinuma and Namco Bandai producer Koji Nakajima. Nakajima read the One Piece manga and also played the Dynasty Warriors video games during his youth. The producers eventually realized that an action game involving Luffy fighting with sailors in a video game would be interesting. Koinuma said that the developers wanted to "express the charm of original author Eiichiro Oda's manga art as best as we can". Koinuma also wanted a "look that worked well in the game" and to make it "approachable while still allowing video game experts to put their own techniques into it."

According to Shin Unozawa, vice president of D3 Publisher, the game's title was originally just One Piece Musou before Eiichiro Oda himself changed it. Oda was also very impressed by the quality of the character models when he first saw the demo movie, believing the game's cinematics to be on par with those seen in a full budget movie. As a result, he turned down the development team's request to illustrate the game's cover image, believing that the models alone were enough to showcase the game.

The game was first announced in the early September issue of the Weekly Shōnen Jump magazine. The announcement featured screenshots of Monkey D. Luffy, highlighting the game's mechanics. In September 2011, Namco Bandai Games issued a press release announcing that the game would be developed by Tecmo Koei's Omega Force division. Pirate Warriors was first shown at the 2011 Tokyo Game Show convention along with One Piece: Gigant Battle 2! New World.

In late December 2011, Namco Bandai filed a trademark in Europe for Pirate Warriors. In early February 2012, the company also filed the Pirate Warriors trademark in the United States. On February 13, Namco Bandai announced that the development of Pirate Warriors was finished at their press conference and showed another trailer of the game. Namco Bandai president Shin Unozawa revealed that the game had 500,000 pre-orders. At the same event, Serina of SDN48 cosplayed as Boa Hancock. On April 11, 2012, Namco Bandai revealed that Pirate Warriors would be released for North America on September 25, 2012, and Europe on September 21, 2012, with plans for digital download on the PlayStation Network and distribution plans with retailers.

== Versions and merchandise ==
The game was released on March 1, 2012, in Japan. In the early December issue of Weekly Shōnen Jump, it announced that Pirate Warriors would be bundled in Japan with the Treasure Box, a collector's edition which includes the game's soundtrack, 15 collectible pins, a serial code to download nine custom themes featuring individual members of the Straw Hat Pirates, and a book featuring character and CG-rendered artwork and environments from the game's production. Namco Bandai and Tecmo Koei also confirmed that the game would be bundled with a gold PlayStation 3 with a print of Luffy and the Pirate Warriors logo on it. Sony Computer Entertainment president Hiroshi Kawano revealed that the PlayStation 3 was used as a pressing process.

== Legacy ==
A sequel, One Piece: Pirate Warriors 2, was released for PlayStation 3 and PlayStation Vita in Japan on March 20, 2013. The PlayStation 3 version was later released in Europe on August 30, 2013, and as a digital-only release in North America on September 3, 2013. A third game, One Piece: Pirate Warriors 3, was released for PlayStation 3, PlayStation Vita, PlayStation 4, and Microsoft Windows on March 26, 2015, in Japan, and later for Nintendo Switch on December 21, 2017, in Japan. And a fourth game, One Piece: Pirate Warriors 4, was released for PlayStation 4, Xbox One, Nintendo Switch, and Microsoft Windows on March 27, 2020.

== Reception ==
Reception

Aggregate score
Aggregator	Score
Metacritic	64/100

Review scores
Publication	Score
Destructoid	6.5/10
Famitsu	36/40
GameSpot	4/10
GameZone	6.5/10
IGN	6/10
PlayStation Official Magazine – Australia	6/10
PlayStation Official Magazine – UK	6/10
Play	69%
PlayStation: The Official Magazine	6/10

The game received "mixed" reviews according to the review aggregation website Metacritic.

The game was rated 36 out of 40 by the Japanese gaming magazine Famitsu. The game was a huge success in Japan, in its first week it sold over 655,774 copies and by December 2012, the game has shipped over 1.2 million units worldwide.
