= Chigusa Ikeda =

Japanese voice actress

Chigusa Ikeda (池田千草, Ikeda Chigusa; born June 5, 1976), also known under the name Miruku Uchimura (内村みるく, Uchimura Miruku), is a Japanese voice actress from Tokyo, Japan, and is employed by Aoni Production.

== Voices roles ==
=== Anime ===
- A-kuei
- Beyblade
- Deltora Quest (Filli)
- Demashita! Powerpuff Girls Z (Shirogane Himeko)
- Figure 17
- Gegege no Kitaro
- Hamtaro
- Kamichama Karin
- Kirarin Revolution (Na-san)
- Mirmo!
- Mistin
- Ojamajo Doremi
- One Piece
- Pocket Monsters (Jigglypuff)
- Tweeny Witches (Mileth)
- Yakitate!! Japan

=== Games ===
- Miko Miko Nurse
- Minna de Kitaeru Zenno Training
- Mirmo!
- One: Kagayaku Kisetsu e
- Ratchet & Clank
- Rune Factory Frontier (Rita)
- Valkyria Chronicles

=== Dubbing ===
- Clifford the Big Red Dog (Emily Elizabeth)
- Freak House (Sutina Digest)
