= Dragon Quest Champions =

2023 video game

- Developer: Omega Force
- Publisher: Square Enix
- Director: Tomohiko Sho
- Producers: Takuma Shiraishi; Tomohiko Sho
- Series: Dragon Quest
- Platforms: Android, iOS
- Release: JP: June 13, 2023
- Genre: Role-playing
- Modes: Single-player, multiplayer

Dragon Quest Champions (Note: Known in Japan as ドラゴンクエスト チャンピオンズ (Japanese: Doragon Kuesuto Chanpionzu)) was a 2023 action role-playing game developed by Omega Force and published by Square Enix for Android and iOS. An entry in the Dragon Quest series, it was released free-to-play in Japan. The game follows an adventurer who joins the Heroic Martial Arts Tournament, seeking to become the new hero of the land and find their lost father. The game was shut down on July 30, 2024.

== Gameplay ==
The game uses a turn-based role-playing command system, similar to mainline Dragon Quest titles, in which players explore open world areas and battle against enemies. A secondary mode, dubbed Tournament mode, has players fighting in real-time action role-playing Player versus player multiplayer matches against 50 other players, similar to battle royale video games.

== Plot ==
After the Demon King was defeated by the Hero, the world has returned to peace. The "Heroic Martial Arts Tournament", hosted in honor of the hero, has since gained massive popularity. The player controls an adventurer who wants to become the new hero, as well as find their lost father. For that goal, they join the Heroic Martial Arts Tournament.

== Development ==
On January 10, Square Enix announced that a new role-playing video game entry in the Dragon Quest series was in development for iOS and Android. The game was formally announced by Square Enix and Koei Tecmo on January 18, 2023, as developed by Omega Force, a division of Koei Tecmo, to be published by Square Enix. On the same day, a closed beta was announced, which ran between February 6 to 13 of the same year. It was released on June 13, 2023, on Android and iOS in Japan.
