= One Piece: Pirate Warriors 2 =

2013 video game

- European cover art
- Developer: Omega Force
- Publisher: Bandai Namco Games (Note: Released under the Bandai label)
- Director: Tomoyuki Kitamura
- Producers: Koji Nakajima; Hisashi Koinuma
- Designer: Takahiro Kawai
- Programmer: Yoshinao Yamagishi
- Series: One Piece: Pirate Warriors (One Piece)
- Platforms: PlayStation 3, PlayStation Vita
- Release: JP: March 20, 2013; EU: August 30, 2013; NA: September 3, 2013
- Genres: Action-adventure; Beat 'em up
- Modes: Single-player, multiplayer

One Piece: Pirate Warriors 2 (Note: One Piece: Pirate Warriors 2 (ONE PIECE(ワンピース) 海賊無双2, Wan Pīsu: Kaizoku Musou 2)) is an action video game developed by Omega Force and published by Bandai Namco Games for PlayStation 3 and PlayStation Vita. It is the sequel to One Piece: Pirate Warriors. Due to the success of the first game, the sequel was released the year following. It was released in Japan on March 20, 2013, Europe on August 30, 2013, and in the U.S. on September 3, 2013.

A sequel, One Piece: Pirate Warriors 3, was released in March 2015. And a fourth game, One Piece: Pirate Warriors 4, was released in March 2020.

== Gameplay ==
The game no longer uses a canon story like the original. Instead it uses an original story that take place two years after the Straw Hats Pirates entered the New World. Battles have been changed to focus more on the warrior gameplay, and the player will have to fight through higher numbers of enemies than the previous game. The quick time events from the first game has been removed completely. The game also features a coin system, in which players can spend the money they earn from stages to level up new characters quickly, instead of training them from level 1.

One noticeable change from the previous game is how support is handled. Players can build up a support gauge throughout gameplay, and use it to go into "Style mode". When in this mode they have the option of temporarily switching characters, and playing as the new character until the support gauge runs out. Style mode also gives a different benefit depending on the characters used: "Armament" characters do more damage when attacking, while "Observation" characters effectively slow down time, while retaining their normal speed.

== Characters ==
The game features a total of 27 playable characters, including all 13 characters from the previous game. As with the previous game, other characters appear as non-playable enemies.

Newcomers to the series are marked in bold.

- **Bartholomew Kuma**
- Boa Hancock
- **Borsalino (Kizaru)**
- Brook
- **Buggy**
- **Crocodile**
- **Dracule Mihawk**
- Edward Newgate (Whitebeard)
- **Enel**
- Franky
- Jimbei
- **Kuzan (Aokiji)**
- **Marco**
- **Marshall D. Teach (Blackbeard)**
- **Monkey D. Garp**
- Monkey D. Luffy
- Nami
- Nico Robin
- **Perona**
- Portgas D. Ace
- Roronoa Zoro
- **Sakazuki (Akainu)**
- Sanji
- **Smoker**
- Tony Tony Chopper
- **Trafalgar Law**
- Usopp

== Soundtrack ==
There are 15 tracks along with the previous song from One Piece: Pirate Warriors, which also re-used again in this game.

== Reception ==
Reception

Aggregate score
Aggregator	Score
Metacritic	(PS3) 71/100

Review scores
Publication	Score
GameRevolution	7/10
Hardcore Gamer	4/5
IGN	6.5/10
Push Square	8/10

The game sold more than 410,000 copies on PlayStation Vita and PlayStation 3 combined in its first week in Japan, and managed to be the seventh most downloaded game in its first week on PlayStation Network in the United States. It has a score of 71/100 on Metacritic. IGN awarded it a score of 6.5 out of 10, saying "One Piece: Pirate Warriors 2 starts slow, but its over-the-top combat and personality redeem it in the end."
