= Toukiden 2 =

2016 video game

- Developer(s): Omega Force
- Publisher(s): Koei Tecmo
- Director(s): Kazutoshi Sekiguchi
- Producer(s): Takashi Morinaka
- Artist(s): Hidari
- Composer(s): Hideki Sakamoto
- Platform(s): Microsoft Windows; PlayStation Vita; PlayStation 3 PlayStation 4
- Release: JP: July 28, 2016; EU: March 24, 2017; NA: March 21, 2017
- Genre(s): Action role-playing
- Mode(s): Single-player, multiplayer

Toukiden 2 (討鬼伝2) is a 2016 action role-playing game developed by Omega Force and published by Koei Tecmo for Microsoft Windows, PlayStation 3, PlayStation 4, and PlayStation Vita. The game is the sequel to Toukiden: The Age of Demons.

== Gameplay ==
New to the Toukiden series, the element of Control is also empowered by Mitama, which specialises in summoning Oni to fight for the player. Mitama grow and develop during battles. In order to increase the levels of your Boosts, you must meet the upgrade conditions of each Boost and have sufficient proficiency with them. The upgrade conditions differ for each Mitama and Boost. Each Mitama can learn up to nine Boosts, but you can only equip three of them at a time.

- World exploration has shifted to be open world. Hunting grounds from previous games return with alterations. Certain sections of the world map will be locked depending on the player's progression with the main story; destinations may also be marked when fulfilling requests. Mahoroba Village serves as the game's new primary hub, day and night system.
- The protagonist's spare inventory and setups can be accessed from chests scattered across the world map.
- Players can raise multiple Tenko and give them names. If well-cared for, they will occasionally find items and follow the protagonist.
- Combat has been altered to be seamless encounters that happen anywhere in the field.
- "Demon Hand" is a new secondary feature for traveling and fighting giant demons. The invention can hook onto objects or minor demons to quickly close distances or destroy obstacles. Against giant demons it can do the following: stun them, lock onto a specific body part or completely obliterate a demon's body part(s). This feature is controlled via touchscreen in the Vita version.
- Slayers have a new faster running ability
- Automatons are deployed to scavenge for items in different locations, though they may receive damage upon returning. Damaged automatons can be repaired or made stronger by augmenting them with various materials.
- Using the Professor's research facility allows players to craft better materials from item drops. Adding more materials increases the crafting's success rate.
- A miasma gauge appears when entering corrupted areas. If this gauge is completely filled, the player character will perish. End miasma by cutting down the demon within the cursed stone.
- Regions have hazard levels ranging from safe to dangerous. Eliminating demons raises the area's safety which unlocks new items and weapons.
- Golden Slayer seals act as a new optional collection quest. Hunt for every hidden seal around the world to get a special prize.
- Medium-sized demons have been added; they are the middle ground between common and giant ones.
- While players can still enhance their equipment by visiting the blacksmith, they may occasionally encounter the blacksmith prodigy Kiyomaro who provides superior bonuses.
- Every weapon has updated actions added to their movesets. New weapons include the sword and shield and the trick whip.
- Players can gain temporary buffs and skills by eating Kuon's meals. New recipes are added as more requests or story events are cleared.
- New customization options are available for protagonists.

== Plot ==
The game's setting takes place two years after Kiwami. In Toukiden 2, players will assume the mantle of a mysterious Slayer who has awakened after a ten-year slumber to a world shrouded in darkness. As revealed in Toukiden: The Age of Demons, humanity was protected for centuries by a secret clan of warriors, the Slayers, trained to dispose of the supernatural threat before it could consume the world. An event known as the Awakening caused rifts to appear in space and time – resurfacing places that had long disappeared from the world and unleashing swarms of Oni that relentlessly hunted humans. Koei Tecmo published an anime short as a prequel to the game, the animation was handled by Studio 4°C and it was directed by Takahiro Tanaka.

Defeating Oni will free souls of fallen heroes known as Mitama, who are based on Japanese historical figures and can be utilised to power-up your character, weapons, armour and the Demon Hand.

=== Slayers ===
- The slayers were an organization that had been secretly defeating monstrous Oni for over a millennium. However, with the arrival of the Awakening, in which Oni appeared suddenly in numbers never before seen, the Slayers were given a chance to stand at the center stage of history as guardians of the world of mankind. Warriors that are affiliated with the slayers are also referred to as slayers

=== Demon Hands ===
- A device developed by the Professor that gives thoughts physical form and also the name given to the giant hand that it can be used to create. An attack with a demon hand contains the power to pulverize the limbs of Oni, leaving no trace. In addition to Oni, it's also able to interact with a variety of different objects, including both natural and supernatural objects

== Development ==
It was first announced to the public on stage at the SCEJA Press Conference 2015. A limited edition was released in Japan called “Treasure Box” and included an art book, original soundtrack CD, nine character illustrations, and DLC for exclusive armor. Originally is set to be released on June 30, 2016, but it was delayed to July 28, 2016.

In February, Koei released two story trailers confirming North American and European release for spring. To celebrate the European launch, producer Takashi Morinaka delivered a special message to fans on YouTube. Less than a week before the game launch in North America, a demo was available on PSN for PS4 and PS Vita. The PS3 version was only released in Japan.

The current version on Windows is 1.03.

== Reception ==
Reception

Aggregate score
Aggregator	Score
Metacritic	PC: 73/100; PS4: 77/100

Review scores
Publication	Score
Destructoid	9/10
GameSpot	7/10
RPG Site	9/10

Toukiden 2 received generally favorable reviews according to review aggregator Metacritic.

GameSpot praised Toukiden 2 as "an exciting beast hunting game that understands the importance of storytelling." Toukiden 2 has made "sorely needed improvements" to the monster hunter formula according to Destructoid, among them a new open world map, fast travel points, reduced item farming, more oni and quest variety, intriguing story and compelling characters.
