= Omega Force =

Japanese video game developer

- Native name: オメガフォース
- Type: Division
- Industry: Video games
- Founded: 1996; 30 years ago
- Founder: Akihiro Suzuki; Kenichi Ogasawara
- Headquarters: Ashikaga, Tochigi, Japan
- Key people: Tomohiko Sho (president)
- Products: Dynasty Warriors series Samurai Warriors series One Piece: Pirate Warriors series
- Parent: Koei (1996–2010); Koei Tecmo (2010–present)

Omega Force (Japanese: オメガフォース) (stylized as ω-Force) is a Japanese video game developer and a division of Koei Tecmo founded in 1996 by Akihiro Suzuki and Kenichi Ogasawara that is best known for the Dynasty Warriors series of video games.

== History ==
Omega Force was founded in 1996 as the fourth Business Division of Koei to widen the appeal of Koei's portfolio outside of their strategy and simulation games such as Romance of Three Kingdoms and Nobunaga's Ambition. Kenichi Ogasawara originally joined Koei in hopes of being able to work on Nobunaga's Ambition, of which he was a fan, as a planner. Due to his lack of programming skills, he was assigned to a training course to become a programmer whilst porting games from NEC PC-9801 to the Super NES. Ogasawara, after being promoted to planner, was then tasked by Koei to create a 3D action game using the technological capabilities of the PlayStation. This resulted in the development of Dynasty Warriors and the establishment of Omega Force.

The studio was originally going to be named after the letter Z, but this idea never came to fruition as the letter Z can have different meanings outside of Japanese culture. Wanting to keep the last letter of the alphabet, they settled for Omega from the Greek alphabet; however, due to copyright concerns with the clock manufacturing company Omega SA, Force was added – a Japanese homophone for "fourth" – representing that they are the fourth business division.

WinBack, released in 1999 for the Nintendo 64, pioneered the cover-based third-person shooter and inspired games such as Kill Switch, Gears of War, and Metal Gear Solid 2: Sons of Liberty. It also featured an early rendition of a laser sight mechanic for weapon aiming, which would later be seen in games like Resident Evil 4. The cover system has since become a staple of the third-person shooter genre. With WinBack, which was originally shown off at the 1999 Electronic Entertainment Expo and later at the 1999 Nintendo Space World trade show, Omega Force was once again tasked by Koei to create a title it wasn't known for.

In 2016, Kenichi Ogasawara mentioned during an interview with Famitsu that the next entry in their key franchise Dynasty Warriors, titled Dynasty Warriors 9, was in development. He hoped to have a greater impact with Dynasty Warriors 9, as he mentioned "the evolution from Dynasty Warriors 7 to 8 was insufficient". Producers Masaki Furusawa and Akihiro Suzuki planned to overhaul the franchise's often criticized combat system. In 2018, Omega Force released Dynasty Warriors 9, moving the franchise from its arena-based combat to an open-world.

Hyrule Warriors: Age of Calamity, the third collaboration project between Omega Force and Nintendo, released in 2020 and quickly became the best-selling Warriors game as well as the developer's best-selling title, shipping over 4 million copies as of January 2022.

In 2022, Omega Force announced a partnership with Electronic Arts, along with its parent company Koei Tecmo. Their new game, Wild Hearts, would be published under their EA Originals label. The game was officially announced on September 23, 2022. Wild Hearts' director, Kotaro Hirata, mentioned that Dynasty Warriors has become a pillar franchise for Omega Force, and that with Wild Hearts they wanted another strong pillar franchise for Omega Force, hoping to widen their audience and create more internationally appealing titles. EA's Andrew Wilson mentioned in an investor meeting that the success of Monster Hunter led to EA greenlighting the title.

== Games ==
=== Warriors games ===
The Warriors series, known in Japan as the Musō (無双, lit. "Unrivaled") series, is an action game series created by Omega Force and published by Koei Tecmo. The meta-series contains various series, such as the Dynasty Warriors games, the One Piece: Pirate Warriors games, the Warriors Orochi games, the Samurai Warriors games, and various spin-offs.

==== Dynasty Warriors ====
Dynasty Warriors, known in Japan as Sangokumusou (三國無双, Sangokumusō; lit. "Three Kingdoms Unrivaled"), is the first and the largest Warriors subseries. In Japanese, all games after the original Dynasty Warriors carry the Shin · Sangokumusou (真・三國無双, Shin · Sangokumusō; lit. "True · Three Kingdom Unrivalled") title, but English localizations continue to use Dynasty Warriors, putting all international releases a number ahead of their Japanese counterparts.

===== Main series =====
Year	Title	Genre	Platform(s)	Notes
1997	Dynasty Warriors	Fighting game	PlayStation	Known as Sangokumusou (三國無双, Sangoku Musō) in Japan.
2000	Dynasty Warriors 2	Action, Hack and slash	PlayStation 2, PlayStation 3	Known as Shin · Sangokumusou (真・三國無双) in Japan.
2001	Dynasty Warriors 3	Action, Hack and slash	PlayStation 2, PlayStation 5, Xbox, Xbox Series X/S, Nintendo Switch, Nintendo Switch 2, Steam	An expansion, Dynasty Warriors 3: Xtreme Legends (known as Shin · Sangokumusou 2 Moushouden in Japan), was released in 2002. A remastered version, Dynasty Warriors 3: Complete Edition Remastered (known as ''Shin · Sangokumusou 2 with Moushouden Remastered in Japan), is planned for a worldwide release on 19 March 2026 but delayed. On 3 June 2026, State of Play announce official release date of planned game on 1 October 2026.
2003	Dynasty Warriors 4	Action, Hack and slash	PlayStation 2, Xbox, Microsoft Windows	Several expansions were released: Dynasty Warriors 4: Xtreme Legends, Dynasty Warriors 4: Empires and Dynasty Warriors 4: Hyper
2005	Dynasty Warriors 5	Action, Hack and slash	PlayStation 2, Xbox, Xbox 360, Microsoft Windows	Several expansions were released: Dynasty Warriors 5: Xtreme Legends, Dynasty Warriors 5: Empires and Dynasty Warriors 5: Special
2007	Dynasty Warriors 6	Action, Hack and slash	PlayStation 2, PlayStation 3, PlayStation Portable, Xbox 360, Microsoft Windows	Several expansions were released: Dynasty Warriors 6: Empires and Dynasty Warriors 6: Special
2011	Dynasty Warriors 7	Action, Hack and slash	PlayStation 3, PlayStation Portable, Xbox 360, Microsoft Windows	Several expansions were released: Dynasty Warriors 7: Xtreme Legends, Dynasty Warriors 7: Empires and Dynasty Warriors 7: Special
2013	Dynasty Warriors 8	Action, Hack and slash	PlayStation 3, PlayStation 4, PlayStation Vita, Xbox 360, Microsoft Windows	Several expansions were released: Dynasty Warriors 8: Xtreme Legends and Dynasty Warriors 8: Empires
2018	Dynasty Warriors 9	Action, Hack and slash	Nintendo Switch, PlayStation 4, PlayStation 5, Xbox One, Xbox Series X/S, Microsoft Windows	An expansion, Dynasty Warriors 9: Empires, was released.
2025	Dynasty Warriors: Origins	Action, Hack and slash	PlayStation 5, Xbox Series X/S, Microsoft Windows, Nintendo Switch 2	A "major DLC" expansion, "Visions of Four Heroes" was released on January 22, 2026. A Nintendo Switch 2 version was also released on the same date.

===== Spin-offs =====
Year	Title	Genre	Platform(s)	Notes
2004	Dynasty Warriors	Action, Hack and slash	PlayStation Portable	Known as Shin · Sangokumusō (真・三國無双) in Japan.
2004	Shin · Sangokumusō BB	MMORPG	Microsoft Windows	
2005	Dynasty Warriors Advance	Action, Hack and slash	Game Boy Advance	
2006	Dynasty Warriors Online	MMORPG	PlayStation 3, PlayStation 4, Microsoft Windows	
2006	Dynasty Warriors Vol. 2	Action, Hack and slash	PlayStation Portable	
2006	Jan · Sangokumusō	Mahjong game	PlayStation 2, PlayStation Portable, Nintendo DS	
2007	Dynasty Warriors DS: Fighter's Battle	Action, Hack and slash	Nintendo DS	
2009	Dynasty Warriors: Strikeforce	Action, Hack and slash	PlayStation 3, PlayStation Portable, Xbox 360	
2010	Shin · Sangokumusō Multi Raid 2	Action, Hack and slash	PlayStation Portable	
2011	Dynasty Warriors Next	Action, Hack and slash	PlayStation Vita	
2012	Shin · Sangokumusō Vs	Action, Hack and slash	Nintendo 3DS	
2014	Shin · Sangokumusō Blast	Tactical role-playing	Android, iOS	
2016	Dynasty Warriors: Godseekers	Tactical role-playing	PlayStation 3, PlayStation 4, PlayStation Vita	

==== Samurai Warriors ====
Samurai Warriors, known as Sengokumusou (戦国無双, Sengoku Musō; lit. "Unrivaled Warring States") is the series based loosely around the Sengoku ("Warring States") period of Japanese history.

Year	Title	Genre	Platform(s)	Notes
2004	Samurai Warriors	Action, Hack and slash	PlayStation 2, PlayStation Portable, Xbox	An expansion released: Samurai Warriors: Xtreme Legends.
2006	Samurai Warriors 2	Action, Hack and slash	PlayStation 2, PlayStation 3, PlayStation Vita, Xbox 360, Microsoft Windows	Several expansions were released: Samurai Warriors 2: Xtreme Legends, Samurai Warriors 2: Empires.
2007	Samurai Warriors: Katana	Rail shooter	Wii	
2009	Samurai Warriors 3	Action, Hack and slash	Wii, PlayStation 3, PlayStation Portable	Several expansions were released: Samurai Warriors 3: Moushouden, Samurai Warriors 3: Empires
2011	Samurai Warriors: Chronicles	Action, Hack and slash	Nintendo 3DS	
2012	Sengoku Musō Chronicles 2nd	Action, Hack and slash	Nintendo 3DS	
2014	Sengoku Musou Shoot	Arcade	Android, iOS	
2014	Samurai Warriors 4	Action, Hack and slash	PlayStation 3, PlayStation 4, PlayStation Vita, Nintendo Switch, Microsoft Windows	Several expansions were released: Samurai Warriors 4-II, Samurai Warriors 4: Empires and Samurai Warriors 4 DX
2014	Samurai Warriors: Chronicles 3	Action, Hack and slash	PlayStation Vita, Nintendo 3DS	
2016	Samurai Warriors: Spirit of Sanada	Action, Hack and slash	PlayStation 3, PlayStation 4, PlayStation Vita, Nintendo Switch, Microsoft Windows	Known as Sengoku Musou ~Sanada Maru~ (戦国無双 ～真田丸～) in Japan.
2021	Samurai Warriors 5	Action, Hack and slash	PlayStation 4, Nintendo Switch, Xbox One, Microsoft Windows	

==== Warriors Orochi and Warriors All-Stars ====
Warriors Orochi, known as Musou Orochi (無双OROCHI, Musō Orochi) in Japan, is a series developed by Koei and Omega Force. It is a crossover of Dynasty Warriors and Samurai Warriors.

Year	Title	Genre	Platform(s)	Notes
2007	Warriors Orochi	Action, Hack and slash	PlayStation 2, PlayStation Portable, Xbox 360, Microsoft Windows	
2008	Warriors Orochi 2	Action, Hack and slash	PlayStation 2, PlayStation Portable, Xbox 360	Known as Musou Orochi Maou Sairin (無双OROCHI 魔王再臨, Musō Orochi Maō Sairin; lit. "Unrivalled Orochi Demon Lord Rebrith") in Japan.
2009	Musou Orochi Z	Action, Hack and slash	PlayStation 3, Microsoft Windows	
2011	Warriors Orochi 3	Action, Hack and slash	PlayStation 3, PlayStation 4, PlayStation Portable, PlayStation Vita, Nintendo Switch, Wii U, Xbox One, Microsoft Windows	Known as Musou Orochi 2 (無双OROCHI 2, Musō Orochi Tsū) in Japan.
2017	Warriors All-Stars	Action, Hack and slash	PlayStation 4, PlayStation Vita, Microsoft Windows	Crossover between multiple Koei Tecmo franchises such as Ninja Gaiden, Dead or Alive, Toukiden and Atelier.
2018	Warriors Orochi 4	Action, Hack and slash	PlayStation 4, Nintendo Switch, Xbox One, Microsoft Windows	
2025	Warriors: Abyss	Roguelike	Nintendo Switch, PlayStation 4, PlayStation 5, Xbox Series X/S, Microsoft Windows	

==== Licensed ====
Year	Title	Genre	Platform(s)	Notes
2007	Dynasty Warriors: Gundam	Action, Hack and slash	PlayStation 2, PlayStation 3, Xbox 360	Known as Gundammusou (ガンダム無双) in Japan, published by Bandai Namco.
2008	Dynasty Warriors: Gundam 2	Action, Hack and slash	PlayStation 2, PlayStation 3, Xbox 360	Published by Bandai Namco.
2010	Fist of the North Star: Ken's Rage	Action, Hack and slash	PlayStation 3, Xbox 360	Known as Hokutomusou (北斗無双) in Japan.
2010	Dynasty Warriors: Gundam 3	Action, Hack and slash	PlayStation 3, Xbox 360	Published by Bandai Namco.
2012	One Piece: Pirate Warriors	Action, Hack and slash	PlayStation 3	Published by Bandai Namco.
2012	Fist of the North Star: Ken's Rage 2	Action, Hack and slash	PlayStation 3, Xbox 360, Wii U	Known as Shin · Hokutomusou (真・北斗無双) in Japan.
2013	One Piece: Pirate Warriors 2	Action, Hack and slash	PlayStation 3, PlayStation Vita	Published by Bandai Namco.
2013	Dynasty Warriors: Gundam Reborn	Action, Hack and slash	PlayStation 3, PlayStation Vita	Known as Shin · Gundammusou (真・ガンダム無双) in Japan, published by Bandai Namco.
2014	Hyrule Warriors	Action, Hack and slash	Wii U, Nintendo 3DS, Nintendo Switch	Co-developed with Team Ninja, published by Nintendo outside of Japan.
2015	Dragon Quest Heroes: The World Tree's Woe and the Blight Below	Action role-playing, hack and slash	Nintendo Switch, PlayStation 3, PlayStation 4, Microsoft Windows	Published by Square Enix
2015	One Piece: Pirate Warriors 3	Action, Hack and slash	PlayStation 3, PlayStation 4, PlayStation Vita, Nintendo Switch, Microsoft Windows	Published by Bandai Namco.
2015	Arslan: The Warriors of Legend	Action, Hack and slash	PlayStation 3, PlayStation 4, Microsoft Windows, Xbox One	
2016	Dragon Quest Heroes II	Action role-playing, hack and slash	Nintendo Switch, PlayStation 3, PlayStation 4, PlayStation Vita, Microsoft Windows	Published by Square Enix
2016	Berserk and the Band of the Hawk	Action, Hack and slash	PlayStation 3, PlayStation 4, PlayStation Vita Microsoft Windows	Known as Berserk Musou (ベルセルク無双, Beruseruku Musō) in Japan
2017	Fire Emblem Warriors	Action, Hack and slash	New Nintendo 3DS, Nintendo Switch	Co-developed with Team Ninja, published by Nintendo outside of Japan.
2020	Persona 5 Strikers	Action role-playing, hack and slash	Nintendo Switch, PlayStation 4, Microsoft Windows	Published by Atlus.
2020	One Piece: Pirate Warriors 4	Action, Hack and slash	PlayStation 4, Nintendo Switch, Xbox One, Microsoft Windows	Published by Bandai Namco Entertainment.
2020	Hyrule Warriors: Age of Calamity	Action, Hack and slash	Nintendo Switch	Published by Nintendo outside of Japan.
2022	Touken Ranbu Warriors	Action, Hack and slash, Otome	Nintendo Switch, Microsoft Windows	Published by DMM Games in Japan, and co-developed with Ruby Party.
2022	Fire Emblem Warriors: Three Hopes	Action, Hack and slash	Nintendo Switch	Published by Nintendo outside of Japan.

=== Other ===
Year	Title	Genre	Platform(s)	Notes
1998	Enigma	Adventure game	PlayStation	
1998	Destrega	Fighting game	PlayStation	
1999	WinBack	Third-person shooter	Nintendo 64, PlayStation 2	
2007	Bladestorm: The Hundred Years' War	Real-time tactics	PlayStation 3, PlayStation 4, Xbox 360, Xbox One, Microsoft Windows	
2008	Saihai no Yukue	Strategy, adventure	Nintendo DS	
2010	Trinity: Souls of Zill O'll	Role-playing	PlayStation 3	
2013	Toukiden: The Age of Demons	Action role-playing	PlayStation Portable, PlayStation 4, PlayStation Vita, Microsoft Windows	
2014	Quiz Battle Toukiden	Party	Android, iOS	
2016	Attack on Titan	Action, hack and slash	PlayStation 3, PlayStation 4, PlayStation Vita, Xbox One, Microsoft Windows	Based on Hajime Isayama's Attack on Titan
2016	Toukiden 2	Action role-playing	PlayStation 3, PlayStation 4, PlayStation Vita, Microsoft Windows	
2018	Attack on Titan 2	Action, Hack and slash	PlayStation 4, PlayStation Vita, Xbox One, Microsoft Windows, Nintendo Switch	
2018	Dragon Quest Builders 2	Action role-playing, sandbox	Nintendo Switch, PlayStation 4, Microsoft Windows, Xbox One	Co-developed and published by Square Enix
2023	Wild Hearts / Wild Hearts S	Action role-playing	PlayStation 5, Microsoft Windows, Xbox Series X/S, Nintendo Switch 2	Wild Hearts published by Electronic Arts under EA Originals label
2023	Dragon Quest Champions	Role-playing	Android, iOS	Published by Square Enix
2023	Fate/Samurai Remnant	Action role-playing	Nintendo Switch, PlayStation 4, PlayStation 5, Windows	Co-developed with Kou Shibusawa
2026	Pokémon Pokopia	Life simulation	Nintendo Switch 2	Co-developed with Game Freak
2026	Attack on Titan 3	Action	PlayStation 5, Nintendo Switch 2, Xbox Series X/S, Windows	
