= Samurai Warriors: Katana =

2007 video game

- North American box art
- Developer: Omega Force
- Publisher: Koei
- Series: Samurai Warriors
- Platform: Wii
- Release: JP: September 20, 2007; NA: January 15, 2008; EU: February 22, 2008
- Genre: Rail shooter
- Mode: Single-player

Samurai Warriors: Katana (Note: Japanese: 戦国無双 KATANA, Hepburn: Sengoku Musō: KATANA) is an action video game set in feudal Japan and is based upon the Samurai Warriors series by Koei and Omega Force, a spin-off of the Dynasty Warriors series. The game was revealed for the Wii at Nintendo's pre-E3 conference under the name "Sengoku Action".

== Gameplay ==
The game is played with the Wii Remote and Nunchuk attachment, and the action is seen from a first-person viewpoint. In battle, the player character is equipped with one melee weapon (such as a sword or spear) and one ranged weapon (such as a bow and arrow or cannon). The player can freely switch between melee and ranged weapons during combat. Attacks are performed through either pressing the attack button on the Wii Remote to attack single enemies, or motion-based attacks that can damage groups. The game also includes a competitive multiplayer mode for two players.

Outside of combat, there are running sequences where players must swing their arms with the Wii Remote and Nunchuk in hand to simulate the arms pumping in a running motion. Horseback riding is also included, with the Wii Remote performing the function of the reins while the Nunchuk is used as a whip.

== Reception ==
Reception

Aggregate scores
Aggregator	Score
GameRankings	53.15%
Metacritic	53/100

Review scores
Publication	Score
Electronic Gaming Monthly	3.83/10
Eurogamer	4/10
Game Informer	6/10
GameRevolution	B−
GameSpot	4.5/10
GameSpy	2.5/5
GameTrailers	5.8/10
IGN	5.8/10
Nintendo Power	7.5/10
X-Play	1/5

Samurai Warriors: Katana: was met with mixed reception upon release; GameRankings gave it a score of 53.15%, while Metacritic gave it 53 out of 100.

The game was given 2.5 stars out of five by GameSpy and was rated 4.5 out of 10 by GameSpot. IGN gave it a 5.8 out of 10 rating, with the graphics and presentation being the lowest points.
