= Montana Jones =

1994 comedy adventure anime television series

- Promotional artwork for the TV series Montana Jones

モンタナ・ジョーンズ (Montana Jōnzu)
- Genre: Adventure, Comedy
- Anime television series
- Directed by: Tetsuo Imazawa
- Music by: Gianni Bobbio; Mario Pagano
- Studio: Studio Junio
- Original network: NHK
- Original run: April 2, 1994 – April 8, 1995
- Episodes: 52

Montana Jones (モンタナ・ジョーンズ, Montana Jōnzu) is an Italian-Japanese comedy adventure anime television series produced by Studio Junio, which was broadcast in Japan on NHK from April 2, 1994, through April 8, 1995. It was subsequently broadcast in over thirty countries.

The series takes place in the 1930s and is about the adventures of Montana Jones, who goes treasure hunting with his cousin Alfred Jones and the beautiful reporter Melissa Thorn. They visit real locations and cities like the Pyramids of Giza, the Taj Mahal, Istanbul or Easter Island. Frequently they cross paths with Lord Zero — a rich, eccentric art lover and master thief. All characters in the series are anthropomorphised big cats. The anime was inspired by the Indiana Jones films.

== Synopsis ==
Boston, 1930: Montana Jones and his cousin professor Alfred Jones travel around the world to search lost treasures in order to bring them to museums. Alfred's mentor Professor Gerrit helps them by sending gramophone records with information. On one trip they meet Melissa, a wealthy reporter, who speaks nearly all languages. She accompanies the two on their trips.

The trio's opponent is Lord Zero, a rich, bizarre art lover and master thief. Lord Zero has two henchmen: Slim and Slam. There is also the inventor Dr. Nitro, who also works for Lord Zero and invents strange engines, which to help finding treasures.

== Main characters ==
=== Montana Jones ===
Montana (モンタナ・ジョーンズ, Montana Jōnzu) is always seeking the unknown and isn't afraid to do dangerous things. Together with his cousin Alfred he travels around the world finding treasures for Gerrit, Alfred's professor. The group's plans are often foiled by Lord Zero. Montana works in his aunt's restaurant to finance his airplane Ketty, a Supermarine GS waterplane constantly in need of repair. He lives somewhere on the coast in Boston. It is believed that Montana is infatuated with Melissa Thorn.

He was voiced by Akio Ohtsuka.

=== Alfred Jones ===
Alfred (アルフレッド・ジョーンズ, Arufureddo Jōnzu) likes to study old cultures, strange languages, and treasures. On the other hand, he hates danger, travelling, and can't swim, making him an opposite of his cousin Montana. Together, the two make a good team. Alfred loves his mother and eating spaghetti bolognese, which he often prepares for Melissa and Montana.

He was voiced by Ryusei Nakao.

=== Melissa Thorn ===
Melissa Thorn (メリッサ・ソーン, Merissa Sōn) often helps Montana and Alfred and is the daughter of a diplomat. Melissa is a journalist and enjoys shopping and adventures with the two. In the last episode her father is revealed to be Professor Gerrit, explaining why Melissa was always at the right time and place to help Montana and Alfred.

She was voiced by Junko Iwao.

=== Agatha Jones ===
Agatha (アガサ・ジョーンズ, Agasa Jōnzu)(episodes 1-8, 10, 12-13, 15-18, 23, 24-28, 33-34, 38-39, 45, 51-52) is Alfred's mother, and Montana's aunt.

She was voiced by Rihoko Yoshida.

=== Lord Zero ===
Lord Zero (ゼロ卿, Zero-kyō) is the main antagonist of the story, constantly trying to get all the treasure for himself only to be thwarted by Montana and Alfred. Usually his plans are foiled because of a mistake from his minions Slim, Slam or Dr. Nitro. Lord Zero is notable for his walking staffs, which all have strange and diverse functionalities. Zero is constantly in a bad mood, and personally hates the excuse "I'm sorry, it wouldn't have happened if you gave me more time and money."

He was voiced by Ryuzaburo Otomo.

=== Slim and Slam ===
Slim and Slam (スリム&スラム, Surimu to Suramu) are the bumbling minions of Lord Zero. The two know searching for the treasures themselves would be more successful but their loyalty is greater than their daring. They often do the difficult work for Lord Zero, and when things go wrong they usually take the blame. Ironically, Slim is the larger of the two while Slam is the shorter of the two.

Slim was voiced by Toshiharu Sakurai and Slam was voiced by Chō.

=== Dr. Nitro ===
Doctor Nitro (ニトロ博士, Nitoro-hakase) is a minion of Lord Zero and a genius. He is a creator of machines for Lord Zero that never seem to work the right way, and often gives the excuse "it wouldn't have happened if you gave me more time and money" to defend them. Unfortunately, Lord Zero hates that excuse.

He was voiced by Junpei Takiguchi.

== Episodes and locations ==
Locations of Montana Jones.

There are 52 episodes.

#	Title of episode	Location
1.	The Secret of the Gold Medal	Mexico (Yucatán)
2.	The Giant Squid	Cuba
3.	Treasure Hunting in Istanbul	Turkey (Istanbul)
4.	The Discovery of the Jewel Bible	Czech Republic
5.	The Silk Carpet of the Taj Mahal	India (Agra, Uttar Pradesh)
6.	The Horrible Snowman	China (Tibet)
7.	The Tomb from the Pharaoh	Egypt
8.	King Arthur's Knife	United Kingdom (England)
9.	The Secret Code of the Inkas	Peru
10.	Criminals in Chinatown	United States (San Francisco, California)
11.	Adventuring with the Vikings	Sweden (Gotland)
12.	The Treasure in the Desert	Iraq
13.	The Secrets of the Dried Fountain	Spain (Alhambra, Granada, Andalusia)
14.	A Secret Entrance in the Castle	Germany (Neuschwanstein Castle, Schwangau, Bavaria)
15.	The Subterranean Waterfalls	Cambodia (Angkor Wat, Siem Reap, Siem Reap Province)
16.	Kidnapped to Castle Mauleon	Israel/France
17.	A Muddy Fight for the Future	Greece (Delphi, Phocis, Central Greece)
18.	The Golden Dragon from Hong Kong	China (Hong Kong)
19.	The Hidden Flymachine	Italy (Milan, Lombardy)
20.	The Clock from Ivan the Terrible	Russia (Moscow)
21.	Chased in the Gold Mine	Zimbabwe
22.	The Rescuing Boomerang	Australia (Uluru, Northern Territory)
23.	Attack of the Sharks	Monaco
24.	The Flood's Coming!	Jordan
25.	Emergency! Landing on Easter Island	Chile (Easter Island, Valparaíso Region)
26.	The Sunken Gold Bell	Myanmar (Shwedagon Pagoda, Yangon, Yangon Region)
27.	The Attack of the Bandits in Mongolia	Mongolia
28.	The Haunted House in Scotland	United Kingdom (Scotland)
29.	Searching Through the Labyrinth of King Minos	Greece (Crete)
30.	The Colombian Jungle	Colombia
31.	Saved by the Crocodiles	Egypt (Karnak, Luxor Governorate)
32.	The Treasure of the Caliph	Iraq
33.	The Secret Pirate Ship	Portugal (Belém Tower, Lisbon, Lisbon District)
34.	Emergency! Landing on Treasure Island	Egypt
35.	Adventure in China	China (Xi'an, Shaanxi)
36.	Straight Through Austria	Austria
37.	The Crown of the Tzar	Russia
38.	Marie Antoinette's Collier	Netherlands/Belgium
39.	Lemuria: The Hidden Land	Indonesia
40.	The Secret of the Mont St. Michèl	France (Mont-Saint-Michel, Normandy)
41.	The Stone Dragon	Germany
42.	The Artemis Temple	Turkey (Ephesus, Selçuk, İzmir Province)
43.	Get to the Chaco-Canyon	United States (Texas)
44.	Travel Through Transylvania	Romania (Transylvania)
45.	Locked in Toscana	Italy (Cerveteri, Lazio)
46.	Ormeca	Mexico
47.	Marco Polo's Heir	Italy (Venice, Veneto)
48.	Desperately Lost in the Desert	Algeria
49.	The Baker and the Knight Room	Switzerland
50.	Keanu, Daughter of the Chief	United States (Ohio)
51.	The Monk and the Samurai	Japan
52.	Lost in Africa	Democratic Republic of the Congo

== Video game ==
A eponymously titled video game developed by Future Pirates based on the anime was released in 1995 for the 3DO.
