= Dynasty Warriors Vol. 2 =

2006 video game

- North American box art, featuring Xingcai
- Developer: Omega Force
- Publisher: Koei
- Designer: Fumiya Kato
- Series: Dynasty Warriors
- Platform: PlayStation Portable
- Release: JP: March 23, 2006; NA: October 24, 2006; EU: November 17, 2006; AU: November 30, 2006
- Genre: Hack and slash
- Modes: Single-player, multiplayer

Dynasty Warriors Vol. 2 (真・三國無双 2nd Evolution, Shin Sangokumusō Sekando Eboryūshon; Shin Sangokumusou 2nd Evolution in Japan) is a 2006 hack and slash video game developed by Omega Force and published by Koei for the PlayStation Portable. A spin-off of the Dynasty Warriors series, it is a sequel to Dynasty Warriors.

== Gameplay ==
Identical to other Dynasty Warriors games, the game characters and models are all from Dynasty Warriors 5, but it includes new features and some from Dynasty Warriors (PSP), including multiplayer fight up to 4 players and the ability to trade officers wirelessly with other players. In addition, Vol. 2 fixes the HUD problem found in the original Dynasty Warriors PSP title.

Like the previous Dynasty Warriors PSP title, the game features unique characters from the Samurai Warriors series as special bodyguards. In this game, the characters and their models are taken from Samurai Warriors 2.

Unlike the Dynasty Warriors series' console iterations, the map is divided into a grid system. Each grid contains enemy troops that will retreat if their morale bar hits 0. Sometimes it is necessary to defeat the enemy officers before the enemy retreats.

Each stage usually has two winning conditions, each of which will lead to another possible battle stage. In this way, the story can be quite different each time you play.

The player will earn extra officers after each map is completed. More officers can be gained by either completing a certain character's Musou mode, obtaining 100% in a stage or clearing an entire faction's stages 100%. As the player unlocks more and more officers, the player has a very wide range of characters to choose from as subordinates, with both many advantages and costs. The player can only have between 1 and 4 officers in battle at the same time, depending on the rank of the officers. The player earns more officer command points after each level up.

Some officers only cost 1 command point, but some of the more famous officers cost above the 20 command point mark. Some officers also have special skills you can use by choosing the officer with the D-Pad and then pressing Right on the D-Pad. Most effects are similar to the old 'spoils of war' in previous games, such as replenishing the Musou bar or attack up for 30 seconds. The special abilities can be used every time a star is present on the character's name. The star will then turn into a red circle, which is gradually filled with white, until it becomes a star again.

== Stages ==
Each kingdom (Wei, Wu, Shu, and Other) has its own unique stage map. The path each player takes through the levels depends on conditions met in each level: the levels have either one or two conditions, of which one must be met for victory. The player begins with a limited number of levels; additional levels will be unlocked during gameplay.

All levels have a hidden treasure trove (a couple have two) and/or a "village mission" that the player may conquer during gameplay. Doing so, along with meeting the condition(s) for victory, will unlock the additional levels.

Treasure Trove areas require that you to defeat a strong "Bonus" enemy officer, many of the "Bonus" officers are from the Samurai Warriors series. If you defeat them quickly they will join you.

Village Missions on the other hand involve defeating a certain number of bandits or defending villagers or mayors in a minute. Sometimes the mission can be to defeat the bandit leader. If the mission fails, the village is lost, and the player cannot complete that mission again without reverting to an older save, or playing the map again.

== Reception ==
Reception

Aggregate score
Aggregator	Score
Metacritic	57/100

Review scores
Publication	Score
Eurogamer	7/10
Famitsu	31/40
Game Informer	5/10
GameDaily	5/10
GameSpot	6.1/10
GameSpy	3/5
GameZone	6.5/10
Hardcore Gamer	3.5/5
IGN	5.4/10
Official U.S. PlayStation Magazine	4/10
PALGN	6/10

The game received "mixed" reviews according to video game review aggregator Metacritic. In Japan, Famitsu gave it a score of three eights and one seven, for a total of 31 out of 40. GamePro said in their review, "Koei's outdone the first PSP Dynasty. Vol.2 features proper widescreen graphics and a solid engine with a constant framerate (at the cost of only minor draw-in problems). Behind the sharper graphics and the bigger kit of options, though, there's still an unfortunately shallow, repetitive game." (Note: GamePro gave the game 4/5 for graphics, 3.5/5 for sound, and two 3/5 scores for control and fun factor.)
