= Dynasty Warriors (2004 video game) =

2004 video game

- Box art featuring Gan Ning and Zhenji
- Developer: Omega Force
- Publisher: Koei
- Director: Kenichi Ogasawara
- Series: Dynasty Warriors
- Platform: PlayStation Portable
- Release: JP: December 16, 2004; NA: March 17, 2005; EU: September 1, 2005
- Genre: Hack and slash
- Mode: Single-player

Dynasty Warriors (真・三國無双, Shin Sangoku Musō; Shin Sangokumusou in Japan) is a hack and slash video game developed by Omega Force and published by Koei for the PlayStation Portable. A spin-off of the Dynasty Warriors series, it was released as a launch title for the console in Japan on December 16, 2004 and as a launch title on March 17, 2005 in North America, and September 1, 2005 in Europe. A sequel, Dynasty Warriors Vol. 2, was released in 2006.

== Gameplay ==
The gameplay expands on the Dynasty Warriors series by adding new characters, new modes to play and an archive library which features a gallery of the character artworks as well as game movies.

Similar to the previous Dynasty Warriors predecessor, the objective of each stage in Dynasty Warriors is to conquer the land by invading and defeating the enemy commander. The player must take control of an officer making their way through each individual stage defeating enemy soldiers and officers, while trying to keep their own commander alive. As well as defeating hundreds of soldiers in each stage, there are also specific secondary tasks for the players to complete that can further aid the players in a later stage. These secondary tasks can also enable the players to unlock new features including items, clothing, bodyguards, skills and weapons. Each of the playable officers and commanders have their own unique skills, weapons and superhuman abilities. These superhuman abilities can be activated through a combinations systems allowing the player to create their own style of fighting with different chains of attack put together.

The story mode or campaign mode in the Dynasty Warriors series is known as the Musou Mode. In the Musou Mode, the players begins the campaign choosing an officer or commander from the Three Kingdoms of Shu, Wei, and Wu. There are initially nine available characters to play as from the Three Kingdoms. This includes: Liu Bei, Zhang Fei, and Guan Yu for the Shu Han, Cao Cao, Xiahou Dun, and Xiahou Yuan from the Wei Kingdom, and Sun Jian, Sun Shang Xiang, and Huang Gai for the Wu Kingdom. New characters can also be unlocked through performing special events or through encounters during battles. There are a total of 42 playable characters that could be earned throughout the campaign based on the book Romance of the Three Kingdoms from the Han dynasty.

Each of the playable characters have their own special unique abilities and weapons to equip. Some weapons and items for each individual character can be earned and obtained through defeating generals and lieutenants from different stages. While other specialty weapons and items require the player to complete a specific task or goal in the game with the settings put on "Hard" difficulty. There are two specific types of items throughout the game normal items and red items. These items can be equipped to your characters before the battle begins and can increase the player's statistics. Players can also equip themselves with horses and elephants depending on the terrain at the beginning of the stage allowing for better traveling ability.

In the game players can expect features including gigantic battlefields, enormous number of enemy soldiers and officers to defeat, and multiple events that can occur on each stage depending on the situation. The game also includes new features added to the series of new siege engine. These new siege equipment's include catapults, mechanical bridge layers, arbalest machines, and battering rams. Although it is not required to use all these siege equipment, they can be useful for the players towards completing the stages. There are also a number of items that players can obtain throughout the battles in games that can increase health level, attack and defense power, and movement speed. These in-game items can be found in different locations during the gameplay. Players can retrieve their health level in game by consuming alcoholic beverages like wine or beer and Chinese meat buns that can be often found or dropped by defeated enemy soldiers or in enemy strongholds.

On the battlefield, the player traverse small areas where they must fight until one side loses all of its morale. A new level up system has been implemented, and the player will gain upgraded weapons for each level. The characters from Dynasty Warriors 4 are present. Occasionally in the game, players may be confronted by an enemy officer or lieutenant challenging them into a one vs. one duel. If the player accepts the offer, they would be then transported into a small stadium away from the battlefield where the player and the enemy officer can have a one vs. one fight to the death or until the time runs out. If the player declines the offer, the players’ army's moral rate will drop. If the player is able to defeat the enemy officer within the time frame, the enemy officer will be removed from the battlefield.

Unlike other Dynasty Warriors games, Koei now allows the player to have up to four officers to control during battle. These warriors grow in strength along with the player, gain linked Musou attacks, and can only be deployed if you have enough command points. Though, if the officer appears in the stage, the player cannot select the officer to command.

== Reception ==
Reception

Aggregate scores
Aggregator	Score
GameRankings	64%
Metacritic	62/100

Review scores
Publication	Score
Edge	5/10
Electronic Gaming Monthly	5.83/10
Famitsu	33/40
Game Informer	6/10
GamePro	3.5/5
GameRevolution	D+
GameSpot	6.9/10
GameSpy	3/5
GameZone	6.8/10
IGN	6/10
Official U.S. PlayStation Magazine	3/5

The game was met with mixed reception upon release; GameRankings gave it a score of 64%, while Metacritic gave it 62 out of 100.
