= One Piece: Pirate Warriors =

- Genres: Action-adventure; Beat 'em up
- Developer: Omega Force (Koei Tecmo)
- Publisher: Bandai Namco Entertainment
- Platforms: PlayStation 3 PlayStation Vita; PlayStation 4 PlayStation 5 Microsoft Windows; Nintendo Switch; Nintendo Switch 2 Xbox One; Xbox Series X/S
- First release: One Piece: Pirate Warriors; March 1, 2012
- Latest release: One Piece: Pirate Warriors 4 March 26, 2020

One Piece: Pirate Warriors also known in Japan as One Piece: Kaizoku Musou (ONE PIECE(ワンピース) 海賊無双, Wan Pīsu Kaizoku Musou), is a series of action-adventure video games developed by Omega Force (Koei Tecmo) and published by Bandai Namco Entertainment. It is based on the One Piece manga by Eiichiro Oda and its anime adaptation. It is the most successful One Piece video game series, with over 10 million copies shipped by 2025.

== Gameplay ==
Gameplay screenshot from One Piece Pirate Warriors 3

Pirate Warriors is a series incorporating elements from both the Dynasty Warriors video game series and the One Piece series.

== Games ==
Release timeline
2012	One Piece: Pirate Warriors
2013	One Piece: Pirate Warriors 2
2014
2015	One Piece: Pirate Warriors 3
2016
2017
2018
2019
2020	One Piece: Pirate Warriors 4

One Piece: Pirate Warriors

One Piece: Pirate Warriors (Note: One Piece: Pirate Warriors (ワンピース 海賊無双, Wan Pīsu: Kaizoku Musou)) is the first installment in the One Piece: Pirate Warriors series, released for PlayStation 3. It was released on March 1, 2012, in Japan, September 21, 2012, in Europe, and September 25, 2012, in North America. The game was developed in commemoration of the 15th anniversary of the One Piece manga and anime franchise by Eiichiro Oda. Pirate Warriors was also the first game in the One Piece video game franchise that was released on a PlayStation system since One Piece: Grand Adventure in 2006.

One Piece: Pirate Warriors 2

One Piece: Pirate Warriors 2 (Note: One Piece: Pirate Warriors 2 (ワンピース 海賊無双2, Wan Pīsu: Kaizoku Musou 2)) is the second installment in the One Piece: Pirate Warriors series, released for PlayStation 3 and PlayStation Vita. It was released in Japan on March 20, 2013, Europe on August 30, 2013, and in the United States on September 3, 2013.

One Piece: Pirate Warriors 3

One Piece: Pirate Warriors 3 (Note: One Piece: Pirate Warriors 3 (ワンピース 海賊無双3, Wan Pīsu: Kaizoku Musou 3)) is the third installment in the One Piece: Pirate Warriors series, released for PlayStation 3, PlayStation 4, PlayStation Vita, and Microsoft Windows. It was released in Japan on March 26, 2015 and subsequently in Western territories on August 25, 2015. This is the last One Piece video game released for PlayStation 3. An enhanced port for the Nintendo Switch was released in December 2017.

One Piece: Pirate Warriors 4

One Piece: Pirate Warriors 4 (Note: One Piece: Pirate Warriors 4 (ワンピース 海賊無双4, Wan Pīsu: Kaizoku Musou 4)) is the fourth installment in the One Piece: Pirate Warriors series, released for Microsoft Windows, PlayStation 4, Xbox One, and Nintendo Switch. It was released on March 27, 2020.

== Production and release ==
Year	Title	Director	Designer	Producer(s)		Platform(s)	Original release date		
Year	Title	Director	Designer	Koei Tecmo	Bandai Namco	Platform(s)	Japan	North America	PAL region
2012	One Piece: Pirate Warriors	Tomoyuki Kitamura	Takahiro Kawai	Hisashi Koinuma	Koji Nakajima	PlayStation 3	March 1, 2012	September 21, 2012	September 25, 2012
2013	One Piece: Pirate Warriors 2	Tomoyuki Kitamura	Takahiro Kawai	Hisashi Koinuma	Koji Nakajima	PlayStation 3 PlayStation Vita	March 20, 2013	August 30, 2013	September 3, 2013
2015	One Piece: Pirate Warriors 3	Tomoyuki Kitamura	Hideo Suzuki	Hisashi Koinuma	Koji Nakajima	PlayStation 3 PlayStation Vita; PlayStation 4 Microsoft Windows; Nintendo Switch	March 26, 2015	August 25, 2015	August 28, 2015
2020	One Piece: Pirate Warriors 4	Hideo Suzuki		Akihiro Suzuki	Katsuaki Tsuzuki	Microsoft Windows; PlayStation 4 PlayStation 5 Xbox One; Nintendo Switch	March 27, 2020	March 27, 2020	March 27, 2020

== Reception ==
Aggregate review scores
Game	Metacritic
One Piece: Pirate Warriors	64/100
One Piece: Pirate Warriors 2	PS3: 71/100
One Piece: Pirate Warriors 3	PS4: 74/100; PS Vita: 76/100; PC: 62/100; Switch: 76/100
One Piece: Pirate Warriors 4	PS4: 75/100; XONE: 76/100; Switch: 69/100

=== Commercial reception ===
Title	Release	Sales	Ref(s)
One Piece: Pirate Warriors	March 1, 2012	1,200,000+	
One Piece: Pirate Warriors 2	March 20, 2013	516,269+ (Japan)	
One Piece: Pirate Warriors 3	March 26, 2015	1,023,014+	
Subtotal		4,000,000	
One Piece: Pirate Warriors 4	March 27, 2020	6,000,000	
Total		10,000,000	

== See also ==
- List of One Piece video games
