= Wild Hearts (video game) =

2023 video game

- Developer: Omega Force
- Publishers: Electronic Arts; Koei Tecmo (S)
- Directors: Kotaro Hirata; Takuto Edagawa
- Producer: Yosuke Hayashi
- Artists: Marina Ayano; Yu Oboshi
- Writers: Yuki Ikeno; Mari Okamoto
- Composers: Junya Ishiguro; Masashi Hamauzu; Daisuke Shinoda; Ippo Igarashi; Modanqing Zhu
- Engine: Katana Engine
- Platforms: PlayStation 5; Windows; Xbox Series X/S; Nintendo Switch 2
- Release: February 17, 2023; Switch 2 July 25, 2025
- Genre: Action role-playing
- Modes: Single-player, multiplayer

Wild Hearts is a 2023 action role-playing video game developed by Koei Tecmo under their Omega Force label and published by Electronic Arts under its EA Originals label. The game tasks the player to hunt massive monsters in Azuma, a fantasy world inspired by feudal Japan. The game was released for PlayStation 5, Windows, and Xbox Series X/S on February 17. It was also released for the Nintendo Switch 2 as Wild Hearts S, published by Koei Tecmo, on July 25, 2025.

== Gameplay ==
Players assume the role of a nameless hunter, who must embark on quests to hunt down massive monsters known as Kemono in the world of Azuma. Azuma is not an open world, but instead, several large areas that players can freely explore. The game features eight different weapon types, including the likes of wagasa and katana. In addition to using weapons to defeat enemies, players can also build items to assist combat through the Karakuri mechanic. For instance, players can build crates which can be leapt off of to perform powerful attacks, or a torch which can be used to ignite enemies. These items can be combined to form larger machines, such as a bulwark that blocks an enemy's path. Constructed items are permanent until they are destroyed by Kemono. Players can also build Karakuri to aid traversal. Building Karakuri consumes thread, which can be acquired through simply attacking enemies. As the player progresses in the game, they will unlock new weapons and armors, allowing players to hunt more challenging monsters. The team estimated that players can complete the game's narrative campaign in about 30 hours. Players can team up with two other players as they progress in the game.

== Plot ==
A kemono hunter travels to Azuma after leaving their distant homeland because of warring Samurais and a decline in kemono hunting. The Hunter finds a small piece of Karakuri technology from a mummified corpse before battling a large, ice wielding wolf kemono. The Hunter loses the fight and is left for dead, but is rescued by a mysterious old man named Mujina. Mujina activates and imparts the Karakuri “seed” the Hunter found into their heart and informs the Hunter to head to the town of Minato.

The Hunter regains consciousness and discovers their new found power to conjure up Karakuri objects and harvest celestial threads to fuel their new power. While traveling to Minato, the Hunter rescues the town's blacksmith Natsume and her escort Ujishige from Kemonos. At the request of the town's steward, Toga-hime, the Hunter assists in helping the destitute town prosper by hunting kemono materials. Later, with the help of the town's Karakuri expert Surazan, the Hunter restores the flow of celestial thread to power dormant Karakuri technologies in the town. This however attracts the attention of a gigantic Kemono called Earthbreaker, who hungers for the town's concentration of celestial thread after it was diverted from its territory. The Hunter rallies the townsfolks to defend Minato and slays the beast. As the town celebrates their victory and witness a revered bird of prey kemono Amaterasu fly close by, Suruzan uncovers old records that indicate celestial thread supplies are waning across Azuma and are causing unrest among kemonos.

While out on a mission with Ujishige in the Natsukodachi Isle the duo notice that the environment, normally rocky and aquatic, has become completely frozen over and spot the same ice wolf kemono that nearly killed the Hunter, now called Deathstalker; deeming it responsible for the drastic environmental changes. Surazan hypothesizes that the decrease in celestial threads is causing the Deathstalker to venture far from its territory, the Fuyufusagi Fort, way up north. Ujishige reveals to the Hunter that he was once a retainer for the daimyo who governed from the Fuyufusagi Fort until kemonos led by the Deathstalker turned the area into a frozen wasteland. The Hunter kills the Deathstalker at the fort and both Ujishige and the Hunter escape from two more Deathstalkers after Amaterasu intervenes and fights them.

Surazan discovers that the deceased Deathstalker contains only meager amounts of celestial thread in its system, confirming her hypothesis that the Deathstalker ventured far from its territory in a desperate search for celestial threads. The Hunter and Ujishige further confirm Surazan's findings after discovering that other power kemono variants are migrating far from their usually habitats and are drastically altering the natural environment. The duo returns to Minato only to witness Amaterasu attacking the town to claim its concentration of celestial threads. Mujina arrives and warns the Hunter that the kemonos’ increasingly aggressive and desperate search for scarce celestial threads is sending Azuma into chaos. The Hunter, Ujishige, Natsume, and Surazan bolster the town's defenses and rallies the townsfolks once more to defend against Amaterasu's second arrival. The Hunter slays Amaterasu, helps rebuild Minato, and later slays two more powerful kemonos that have caused a wildfire near Minato. However, the over usage of the Karakuri “seed” causes the Hunter to suffer cardiac arrest and collapse.

Simultaneously Azuma begins to experience a never-ending relentless rainfall that is causing severe ecological damage across Azuma. Mujina appears again and warns the Hunter that the “Rain of a Thousand Days” has occurred, informing the Hunter to end it they must hunt the “source kemono” atop of the Sacred Mountain. As Mujina disappears it is revealed that he is actually the spirit of numerous hunters that failed to quell the “Rain of a Thousand Days” that plaque Azuma in ancient past, leading to the downfall of an ancient hunter community in Minato that once used Karakuri. The Hunter scales the mountain and slays a Celestial Dragon to gain entrance inside the mountain. There the Hunter confronts the Celestial Being, an entity that guards the source of the celestial threads. The Hunter slays the Celestial Being and activates an ancient Kakakuri structure that restores the flow of celestial threads before losing consciousness. The restoration of celestial threads quells the endless rainfall, heals Azuma's ecosystems, and placates the kemonos. The Hunter regains consciousness and returns to Minato.

In the postgame, if the Hunter slays four deeply volatile kemonos they will converse with Mujina once more, who congratulates the Hunter for accomplishing what no human or kemono could ever achieve.

== Development ==
The game was developed by Japanese developer Omega Force, a division of Koei Tecmo. Development of the game started in 2018 and used Koei Tecmo's in-house engine called "Katana Engine". According to game director Kotaro Hirata, the team learned from their experience developing the Toukiden series, and intended to create a modern Japanese monster-hunting game. To stand out from other monster hunting games, the team introduced Kemono, monsters which were described as "a fusion of nature and animals", and Karakuri, a building mechanic which supplements the game's melee combat. Monsters and creatures were designed to be threatening and challenging, so that players would not feel "guilty" about killing them. The team did not make Wild Hearts an installment in the Toukiden series because they felt that the game had its own distinct presentation and combat mechanics. The game world was inspired by feudal Japan, and it features four different biomes, each based on one of the four seasons. Originally the game supported four-player multiplayer; this was later altered as the team believed that it would create imbalanced gameplay.

Hirata mentioned in an interview with The Verge, that Dynasty Warriors had become a pillar franchise for Omega Force, and that with Wild Hearts, they hoped to have another strong pillar franchise.

== Release ==
Publisher Electronic Arts announced its partnership with Omega Force and its parent company Koei Tecmo on September 14, 2022. The game would be published under its EA Originals label, which had previously released smaller, independent video games such as It Takes Two and Unravel. The game was officially announced on September 23, 2022. Wild Hearts was released for PlayStation 5, Windows, and Xbox Series X/S on February 17, 2023, with support for cross-platform play. The game was later released for the Nintendo Switch 2 as Wild Hearts S on July 25, 2025 by Koei Tecmo, without involvement from Electronic Arts.

== Reception ==
Reception

Aggregate scores
Aggregator	Score
Metacritic	(PC) 75/100 (PS5) 79/100 (XSXS) 76/100
OpenCritic	74% recommend 57% recommend (Switch 2)

Review scores
Publication	Score
Destructoid	8/10
Easy Allies	7.5/10
Famitsu	35/40
Game Informer	8/10
GameRevolution	8/10
GameSpot	8/10
GamesRadar+	4/5
Hardcore Gamer	4/5
IGN	8/10
PC Gamer (US)	63/100
Push Square	8/10
RPGFan	84/100
Shacknews	8/10
The Guardian	3/5
Video Games Chronicle	3/5
VG247	3/5

=== Critical reception ===
Wild Hearts received "generally favorable" reviews, according to review aggregator website Metacritic. In Japan, four critics from Famitsu gave the game a total score of 35 out of 40.

Rock Paper Shotgun enjoyed the title's building mechanics, saying it made the player feel "less of a mythical superhero and more of a desperate inventor", but criticized how poor performance was on Windows. Eurogamer praised the game's feudal Japan-inspired world, "it's beautiful stuff – and even more impressive once rampaging Kemono start smashing it to bits". The Verge liked the music and the scope of the fights, writing "The sweeping orchestral score and the sheer size and power of the monsters make even the one-star hunts feel like an epic battle". NPR praised the game's monster appearance and power design, saying "stunning and enormous animals superpowered by primal nature".

=== Sales ===
The PlayStation 5 version of Wild Hearts was the second bestselling retail game during its first week of release in Japan, with 26,905 physical copies being sold across the country.
