= Toukiden: The Age of Demons =

2013 video game

- Developer: Omega Force
- Publisher: Tecmo Koei Games
- Directors: Takashi Morinaka; Kazutoshi Sekiguchi (Kiwami)
- Artist: Hidari
- Composer: Hideki Sakamoto
- Platforms: Toukiden; PlayStation Portable; PlayStation Vita; Toukiden: Kiwami; PlayStation Portable; PlayStation Vita; PlayStation 4 Windows
- Release: June 27, 2013: Age of Demons; JP: June 27, 2013 (PSP, PSV); NA: February 11, 2014; EU: February 14, 2014; AU: February 14, 2014 Kiwami PSP, PS Vita, PS4; JP: August 28, 2014; EU: March 27, 2015; NA: March 31, 2015 Windows; WW: June 26, 2015
- Genre: Action role-playing
- Modes: Single-player, multiplayer

Toukiden: The Age of Demons (Note: Japanese: 討鬼伝, Hepburn: Tōkiden) is an action role-playing game developed by Omega Force for the PlayStation Portable and PlayStation Vita. It was released on June 27, 2013 in Japan. Tecmo Koei Games showcased the PlayStation Vita version of the game at E3 2013, and released the game within North America on February 11, 2014 exclusively on PlayStation Vita. A sequel titled Toukiden 2 was released in 2016 on the PlayStation 3, PlayStation 4 and PlayStation Vita.

== Gameplay ==
In-game screenshot showing the combat interface

Toukiden is a third-person monster hunting game which employs groups of players or NPCs fighting together against various monsters during quests. Each player can customize their choice of weapons, armor and skills. Special abilities can be obtained through the usage of souls, or mitama, which can be collected during the progress of the game. These mitama can level up by gaining experience from battles, or by paying a certain sum of haku. Different mitama have abilities with various characteristics, and can be categorised into various groups such as offensive, defensive, or recovery mitama. Upon slaying a monster, the players or NPCs can "purify" the monster, which collects items useful in upgrading weapons and armor. Monsters fall into the categories of small and large oni, with large oni being the boss-type enemies within the game.

Players can engage in missions co-operatively via an ad-hoc WiFi connection, or over the internet. Additional missions are available in the form of downloadable content.

== Premise ==
The game is set in a fantasy world with medieval Japanese themes, particularly regarding Shinto. Warriors known as mononofu (モノノフ; localised as "slayer" in the western release) specialise in fighting oni, and form teams to hunt them. Eight years prior to the commencement of the story, a great demon emerged from the underworld and brought an era of calamity to the land of Nakatsu Kuni, which was traditionally protected by the mononofu since ancient times. The protagonist and main characters reside at Utakata Village, one of the final lines of defense against the demons.

== Development ==
Toukiden was revealed during Sony's TGS 2012 keynote. The game is developed as a collaboration between Koei and Sony Computer Entertainment Japan; Team Ninja is also involved in the development of the project. Character designs and illustrations were created by Hidari, and the music is composed by Hideki Sakamoto.

Tecmo Koei states that the decision to create Toukiden for the PS Vita and PSP was due to Capcom releasing their Monster Hunter titles on the Nintendo 3DS, and believed that plenty of people using Sony consoles were keen for a hunting game on their systems.

A Chinese-language version was released throughout Asia on September 19, 2013, localised with the assistance of Sony Computer Entertainment Asia.

=== Toukiden: Kiwami ===
An enhanced game titled Toukiden: Kiwami (討鬼伝 極) was released on August 28, 2014 in Japan, for the PS Vita and PSP. The game has double the size and content of the original game, twice the number of demons, two new characters, extended story and new equipment. Additional weapons introduced in the new version include firearms, naginata and kanabō. In addition, there are new character abilities.

Toukiden: Kiwami was released in North America and Europe on March 31, 2015. On January 15, 2015, it was announced that a PlayStation 4 version would be released exclusively in the west, with support for cross-save and multiplayer cross-play between the PS4 and Vita platforms. Toukiden: Kiwami was one of the launch titles for the PlayStation 4's official release in mainland China in January 2015. In June 2015 a PC version of Toukiden: Kiwami was announced for a worldwide Steam release.

== Media ==
=== Manga ===
Toukiden Woniuchi, a manga prequel of Toukiden, began serialization as an ebook on Sony's Reader Store on June 26, 2013. Urasuke Ayano is writing and drawing the story that takes place several years before Tarō Diffendorfer's scenario. Five chapters are currently planned, and they will be released monthly. The seventh volume of Kadokawa Shoten's Samurai Ace magazine, which shipped on Wednesday, will contain a preview of the first chapter and a chapter 0. The issue also contained a code for a mask that can be used in the game.

Within the September 26, 2013 issue of Famitsu, Producer Kenichi Ogasawara has hinted towards expanding the franchise towards anime and manga.

=== Other ===
A four-minute animated promotional trailer was made for the game by Studio 4°C. Jiro Kanai served as director, animation director, and storyboarder for the short. Akiko Saito served as CG director, Kumiko Narumo served as color key and color coordinator, Yusuke Yagisawa served as art director, Mutsuko Kajigaya served as animation checker, Akiko Kankon produced the short, and Naoya Amada supervised the production. Hideki Sakamoto handled the music. Toukiden Kiwami also received an animated introduction.

== Reception ==
Reception

Aggregate score
Aggregator	Score
Metacritic	Vita: 71/100; PS4: 74/100; Vita (Kiwami): 82/100

Review score
Publication	Score
IGN	6.2/10

The retail PlayStation Vita version of Toukiden sold 122,794 units within the first week of release, taking second place for all physical retail video game sales in Japan, behind Gundam Breaker on the PlayStation 3 which debuted within the same week and sold 200,564 units. The same week also saw a spike in PlayStation Vita system sales, with 31,271 consoles sold, a significant increase over the 13,422 consoles sold during the previous week. The PlayStation Portable version of Toukiden sold 66,016 units within the same week. Total game sales were 300,000 units for the month of June 2013. Toukiden placed sixth place amongst all digital copy games sold on the Japanese PlayStation Network overall in 2013, and the fourth most-sold digital Vita game behind Dragon's Crown, God Eater 2 and Senran Kagura Shinovi Versus.

In November 2013, it was announced prior to the PlayStation Awards 2013 that Toukiden was the top selling PlayStation Vita game in Japan for 2013. Toukiden was the second-most purchased digital Vita game on the US PlayStation store during February 2014, which was the month of first release in the West. Koei Tecmo's financial report for the fiscal year ending March 2014 reveals that 550,000 copies have been shipped worldwide.

Famitsu gave Toukiden a review score of 35/40. The enhanced version released in August 2014, Toukiden Kiwami, was given a score of 37/40. Kiwami has a Metacritic rating of 82 for PlayStation Vita, and 74 for PS4.

The Vita version of Toukiden: Kiwami sold 100,073 physical copies within its debut week according to Business Famitsu, representing a 60-80% sell-through within its initial shipment batch and taking first place within that week's sales rankings; at the same time, the PSP version sold 13,518 copies. Within a November 2014 earnings report, Koei Tecmo announced that Toukiden: Kiwami shipped 200,000 copies within the Japanese and Asian regions across both PSP and Vita platforms.
