= Spring House Entertainment =

Taiwanese animation studio

Spring House Entertainment Inc is a Taiwanese animation studio founded in February 2000 by Micho Chang. After spending about twenty years as a television and music video director, Chang was not happy with his role in the entertainment industry. In one interview, Chang stated, "I always thought that I was an artist, but gradually I realized that I was just a subcontractor, creating for client needs rather than for personal expression." He launched Spring House Entertainment and created an animated character – a ten-year-old boy named A-kuei, who lives in the fictional town of Springfall.

The studio is based in Taipei, Taiwan. Since January 17, 2008, Spring House Entertainment Inc. has operated as a subsidiary of Chunghwa Telecom Company, Ltd.

== A-kuei ==
Several short films about A-kuei, ranging in length from ninety seconds to two minutes, have been released through Spring House Entertainment's website. According to Taiwan Info, A-kuei first became popular in the wake of a Taiwanese earthquake when many people found his character to be comforting. His popularity extended to Silicon Valley and rose as his short films spread across the internet through email.

Short films featuring A-kuei use a simple visual style that Chang has compared to that of South Park. In the early days of Spring House Entertainment, the company worked on a very limited budget. Most of its income at that time was earned through advertising and merchandising, since the internet was still fairly rudimentary in Taiwan and was not extensively used in the country. However, in June 2002, Spring House Entertainment began charging for subscriptions to its website.
