= One Piece: Pirate Warriors 4 =

2020 video game

- Japanese cover art
- Developer: Omega Force
- Publisher: Bandai Namco Entertainment
- Director: Hideo Suzuki
- Producers: Katsuaki Tsuzuki; Akihiro Suzuki; Hisashi Koinuma
- Composer: Satoshi Seki
- Series: One Piece: Pirate Warriors (One Piece)
- Platforms: Nintendo Switch; PlayStation 4 Windows; Xbox One; PlayStation 5 Xbox Series X/S; Nintendo Switch 2
- Release: PS4, Nintendo Switch, Xbox One, Windows: WW: March 27, 2020; PS5, Xbox Series X/S, Nintendo Switch 2: WW: November 21, 2025
- Genres: Action-adventure; Beat 'em up
- Modes: Single-player, multiplayer

One Piece: Pirate Warriors 4 (Note: One Piece: Pirate Warriors 4 (ONE PIECE(ワンピース) 海賊無双4, Wan Pīsu: Kaizoku Musou 4)) is a 2020 action video game developed by Koei Tecmo's Omega Force and published by Bandai Namco Entertainment. It was released for the Nintendo Switch, PlayStation 4, Windows, and Xbox One on March 27, 2020. It is the fourth installment in the Pirate Warriors sub-series, based on the One Piece franchise and Koei Tecmo's Dynasty Warriors series. It was released on March 27, 2020, with ports for Nintendo Switch 2, PlayStation 5, and Xbox Series X/S released on November 21, 2025.

== Gameplay ==
The game features gameplay similar to the previous installments, with an original story, featuring an altered version of One Piece's "Wano" story arc. It also features four new multiplayer modes: "Giant Boss Battle", "Total Bounty Battle", "Timed Defense Battle", and "Territory Battle".

== Plot ==
The story adapts numerous story arcs from the original One Piece manga series, though "Wano Country" arc was modified significantly, due to being incomplete at the time of release. Characters such as Cavendish, Bartolomeo, Sabo, Smoker, Tashigi and Kuzan appear in the arc to help the Straw Hat Pirates to free series protagonist Luffy from his cell. As a battle intensifies between Big Mom and Kaido, Blackbeard and his crew also appear. After fighting the crews of Blackbeard, Big Mom, and Kaido, players are met with a final battle against Kaido, who transforms into a dragon after Big Mom, Blackbeard, and Kaido's underlings are defeated. Luffy then defeats Kaido, prompting him to flee the country while everyone celebrates Luffy's victory.

== Characters ==
Pirate Warriors 4 features 43 playable characters, with an additional 24 available as downloadable content for a total of 67. This includes nearly every character from the previous entries, with the exception of Bartholomew Kuma, Caesar Clown, Gecko Moria, Magellan, and Perona.

Newcomers to the series are marked in bold.

- **Bartolomeo**
- **Basil Hawkins**
- Boa Hancock
- Borsalino
- Brook
- Buggy
- **Capone Bege**
- **Carrot**
- **Cavendish**
- **Charlotte Cracker** (DLC)
- **Charlotte Katakuri**
- **Charlotte Linlin**
- **Charlotte Smoothie** (DLC)
- Crocodile
- Donquixote Doflamingo
- Dracule Mihawk
- Edward Newgate
- Emporio Ivankov
- Enel (DLC)
- **Eustass Kid**
- Franky
- **Gol D. Roger** (DLC)
- Issho
- **Jewelry Bonney** (DLC)
- Jimbei
- **Kaido**
- **Kaido (Onigashima Battle)** (DLC)
- **Killer** (DLC)
- **Kin'emon** (DLC)
- **King** (DLC)
- **Koby (Film: Red)** (DLC)
- **Kozuki Oden** (DLC)
- Kuzan
- Marco
- Marshall D. Teach
- Monkey D. Garp (Hero of the Marines) (DLC)
- Monkey D. Luffy
- **Monkey D. Luffy (Onigashima Battle)** (DLC)
- Nami
- Nico Robin
- **Okiku** (DLC)
- Portgas D. Ace
- Rob Lucci
- **Rob Lucci (CP0)** (DLC)
- Roronoa Zoro
- **S-Snake** (DLC)
- Sabo
- Sakazuki
- Sanji
- Shanks
- **Shanks (Film: Red)** (DLC)
- **Silvers Rayleigh** (Rogers Pirates First Mate) (DLC)
- Smoker
- Tashigi
- Tony Tony Chopper
- Trafalgar Law
- **Urouge** (DLC)
- Usopp
- **Uta (Film: Red)** (DLC)
- **Vinsmoke Ichiji**
- **Vinsmoke Judge** (DLC)
- **Vinsmoke Niji**
- **Vinsmoke Reiju**
- **Vinsmoke Yonji**
- **X. Drake** (DLC)
- **Yamato** (DLC)
- **Z** (DLC)

== Development ==
On July 5, 2019, the game was announced at Anime Expo through a reveal trailer.

On February 11, 2025, in celebration of four million sales, ports to the PlayStation 5 and Xbox Series X/S were announced, along with the announcement of additional downloadable content, the contents of which were to be decided by fan votes. On August 9, it was announced that Enel (a returning character), King (a new character from the "Wano Country" arc), and Z (a character from One Piece Film: Z) had the most votes, and would be added as playable characters in a future update. A port for Nintendo Switch 2 was announced on September 13, 2025.

== Reception ==
=== Critical response ===
Reception

Aggregate score
Aggregator	Score
Metacritic	NS: 69/100; PS4: 75/100; XONE: 76/100

Review scores
Publication	Score
Famitsu	36/40
IGN	8/10
Nintendo Life	7/10
Push Square	7/10
Shacknews	8/10

IGN's Mitchell Saltzman stated that "Pirate Warriors 4 is a great One Piece-flavored spin on the Musou genre with a deep roster and simple but fun combat".

=== Sales ===
The PlayStation 4 version of One Piece: Pirate Warriors 4 was the second best-selling retail game during its first week on sale in Japan, with 75,998 copies being sold. The Switch version was the third bestselling retail game during the same week, selling 61,571 copies. By December 2020, One Piece: Pirate Warriors 4 had sold over one million copies, becoming the fastest entry in the Pirate Warriors series to achieve that milestone. As of 2025, the game has sold over 4 million units worldwide.

== See also ==
- List of One Piece video games
