= Cover system =

Video game gameplay mechanic

Niko Bellic takes cover behind a car as the police are pursuing him in Grand Theft Auto IV (2008), which is the first game in its series to feature the cover system.

A cover system is a video game gameplay mechanic that lets certain areas of virtual space, usually a three-dimensional map, provide game characters a protective zone to hide from detection or circumvent taking damage, which can be dynamic and/or variable in games with destructible environments. The mechanism is seen in shooter games, stealth games, real-time tactics (RTT) games and, to a lesser extent, real-time strategy (RTS) games, and is a digital adaptation of the real-life military tactic of defilade behind obstacles, for purposes of attaining defensive advantage against enemy direct fire, suppressive or area of effect attacks.

== Definition ==
In gaming, a cover system lets a player character use stationary or moving obstacles to avoid damage. To be considered a cover system, there must be some physical interaction with the source of cover and the avatar. This means moving to stand in a position behind an object, as in traditional shooter games, while strictly speaking would be classified as "taking cover", does not qualify as an actual cover system in terms of video game mechanics. Some first-person shooters such as Soldier of Fortune bridged the gap somewhat, by allowing players to lean to the sides, allowing the player's avatar to lean out from behind objects to survey the environment or open fire on the enemy, without fully exposing the entirety of the player's own body to the enemy. In addition, the player character must have the ability to move in and out of the covering objects' proximity, leaving the player with moments of vulnerability, partially exposing themselves when they wish to fire on the enemy. This excludes the exclusive use of portable shields as a cover system, though they may often be used to supplement a stationary source of cover, as seen in video games like Army of Two and Gears of War 2.

Other titles outside of first- and third-person shooters also offer implementations of a cover system. Tactical role-playing games such as X-COM enable the player-controlled characters to take advantage of walls and other objects in the environment to provide cover for their units, providing the effect of reducing the chance for that unit to be hit, or reducing the damage taken when hit by incoming fire. Elements of the user interface generally inform the player when cover is in effect, both when positioning player-controlled units, and when firing on enemies that are in cover

== History ==
=== Origins (1975–1998) ===
Brian Ashcraft of Kotaku argues the idea of taking cover in video games is nearly as old as the shoot 'em up genre itself, originating from Taito's seminal 1978 arcade shooter Space Invaders, where the player's laser cannon could take cover behind destructible defense bunkers to avoid enemy fire. An even earlier example of the concept was Taito's 1975 shooter game Gun Fight, where the player characters could take cover behind destructible objects. In 1985, Data East's target shooting game Shootout had enemies who take cover behind objects or buildings and pop out from cover to fire back at the player.

Ryan Lambie, writing for Den of Geek, considers Namco's run and gun arcade game Rolling Thunder (1986) to be "the precursor to the modern cover shooter" due to how the player can hide behind crates, doors and other obstacles to avoid enemy fire. The mechanic of taking cover behind crates and jumping over them was later borrowed by Sega's arcade hit Shinobi (1987). Rolling Thunder 2 (1990) and Rolling Thunder 3 (1993) also allowed the player to enter doors to hide from enemies and dodge their gunfire. In 1988, Konami's Devastators, an early third-person shooter, featured a cover mechanic where destructible objects, such as sandbags and debris littered across the battlefield, could be used to take cover from enemy fire. In 1994, a cover mechanic was used in the game Blackthorne, which allowed the player to take cover by pressing against walls to avoid enemy fire.

Namco's 1995 3D light gun shooter arcade game Time Crisis introduced a dedicated cover button, specifically an "action" foot pedal, that could be used to take cover behind in-game objects. This cover mechanic helped Time Crisis distinguish itself from rival light gun shooters, like Sega's Virtua Cop, and took advantage of the players' hand-foot coordination to create a new arcade game experience. While Time Crisis was a first-person perspective shooter, cover would later be largely bound to third-person shooter titles, due to cover freeing up the camera and for it being easier to judge space when the character is visible on screen. Time Crisis, however, was able to use cover effectively due to being a rail shooter, where the path is already determined and there is no camera control.

=== Modern cover system (1999–2008) ===
WinBack, released by Koei for the Nintendo 64 in 1999, did not allow players to run-and-gun, but instead forced them to stop and shoot, with crates and corners providing cover for the player character to pop out from and fire his weapon.

In 2000, Raven released Soldier of Fortune for the PC which also featured its own lean-and-hide cover system which gave multiplayer combat far more depth. Using corners of walls, boxes, and other assorted obstacles to take cover from enemy fire was essential to successful gameplay.

In 2001's Metal Gear Solid 2: Sons of Liberty, Snake or Raiden able to take cover behind walls, boxes or crates and pop out to shoot at enemies, while the improved enemy AI allowed enemies to also take cover from the player character. The enemies would often take cover to call for backup, and during battle, they would take cover then pop out and shoot at the player or blindly throw grenades from behind their cover. In 2002, The Getaway for the PS2 featured a similar cover mechanic.

The 'Offensive Cover System' (OCS) in Kill.Switch (2003) was one of the foundations for modern cover systems in third-person shooter video games.

Kill.Switch is credited as the first game to feature the cover system as its core game mechanic, and introduced the blind fire mechanic to the cover system. It was also the earliest third-person shooter that required a button press to initiate the action of taking cover. This was the only game at the time to allow the in-game avatar to lean out and shoot, vault over cover, or blind fire during the cover sequence. This cover system was nicknamed 'Offensive Cover System' (OCS) by the developers.

In 2005, CT Special Forces: Fire for Effect featured a cover system inspired by Kill Switch. Uncharted: Drake's Fortune, released in 2007, also began development that year, and took inspiration from Kill Switch for its cover system. In 2006, several shooters featured Kill Switch-inspired cover systems, including Rogue Trooper, a third-person shooter released in May based on the eponymous comic book series by 2000 AD, Tom Clancy's Rainbow Six: Vegas, a first-person shooter released in November that switched to a third-person over-the-shoulder view when initiating cover, and Killzone: Liberation, a third-person action game released in October. Other third-person shooters to feature a cover system that same year include WinBack 2: Project Poseidon, released in April, and Ghost Recon: Advanced Warfighter.

The most famous among them, however, was Gears of War, released by Epic Games in November 2006. It was a third-person shooter focused entirely on cover-based combat. While not the first to use a single button for moving in and out of cover, it used the mechanic more effectively with environments specifically designed with the cover system in mind. The cover system was considered revolutionary at the time and was credited for the massive success and sales of the game and its sequel, Gears of War 2. Its cover system was inspired by Kill Switch, whose lead designer was employed by Epic Games and was involved in the development of Gears of War. In turn, Gears of War inspired a new wave of video games using the third-person, single-button cover system. According to Stuart Lindsay, some games' cover systems are criticized because the cover system is created as an afterthought rather than the game being built around that feature.

=== Recent developments (2009–present) ===
After the video game cover system was popularized, several recent games have attempted to alter or further revolutionize the cover system in a unique way. One such game is the first-person shooter Killzone 2, which utilized a complete cover system that was used in the first-person perspective the entire time. Other first-person shooters like the Rainbow Six: Vegas series have traditionally changed to a third-person view when taking cover. A similar first-person cover approach was used by Rockstar Games in the eighth-generation release of Grand Theft Auto V, with an option to switch to a traditional third-person cover view when necessary as with Rainbow Six: Vegas.

A way games have changed the cover has been shifting the focus from participating in combat from behind cover to only using cover as a last resort. An example is 50 Cent: Blood on the Sand, which rewards players for assaulting enemies. Uncharted 2: Among Thieves uses cover abilities by allowing the player to hang onto cover vertically and use three dimensions of cover to avoid enemy fire. Dark Void uses a 360 degree threat radius, as the player character can fly. This is accomplished through vertical cover like scaling a mountainside or standard cover like walls.

Splinter Cell: Conviction in 2010 introduced cover to cover movement, which allows player character Sam Fisher to quickly move between covers by looking at the next cover and pressing a button. This mechanic was well received and has since been used in most of Ubisoft's third-person games like Ghost Recon: Future Soldier, Splinter Cell: Blacklist, Watch Dogs and The Division. 2011's Deus Ex: Human Revolution allows the protagonist Adam Jensen to quickly switch to another side of cover and quickly switch cover that's short distance on the left or on the right from him while in a third-person perspective. This system was used again in 2012's Hitman: Absolution, also published by Square Enix, and used again for Hitman (2016).

In contrast to some cover-based shooters, Vanquish, a 2010 third-person shooter developed by PlatinumGames, has bullets and missiles coming from all directions in a manner reminiscent of bullet hell shooters and cover is easily destroyed. Often a single shot is enough to remove the player's cover, forcing the player character to be on the move, while the game also penalizes the player on the scoreboard for the amount of time spent in cover. One of its innovations was the slide-boost mechanic that allows the player to slide-boost into and out of cover at high speeds (sometimes in slow motion using bullet time). According to director Shinji Mikami, the sliding boost mechanic was influenced by the 1970s anime series Casshern.

The action-RPG The Last Story includes a cover system that works with both 3rd-person shooting and melee combat systems, and the turn-based tactical XCOM: Enemy Unknown features cover systems as well.

== Reception ==
The cover system has become a large part of modern third-person shooters. Nate Ahearn of Yahoo! News felt that cover systems changed the game experience for the better and reasoned this by claiming that cover systems were so vital because they allowed the player to view the character, creating a deeper connection between the gamer and the player character. In addition, Ahearn felt that having a cover system allowed the game to slow the pace and "really lets you flex the muscle of your fancy new graphics engine", giving games with cover systems advantages over fast-paced shooters.

Cover systems are not universally praised, however. Ben "Yahtzee" Croshaw has repeatedly criticized cover systems in his series Zero Punctuation, arguing that they ruin the flow of gameplay and comparing games that utilize them unfavorably to "retro" first-person shooters that focus on mobility, such as Quake and Duke Nukem 3D.
