= Wild Guns =

1994 video game

- North American cover art
- Developer: Natsume Co., Ltd.
- Publishers: JP: Natsume Co., Ltd.; NA: Natsume Inc.; EU: Titus France
- Designer: Shunichi Taniguchi
- Programmers: Toshiyasu Miyabe; Hiromichi Komuro
- Artist: Shunichi Taniguchi
- Composers: Hiroyuki Iwatsuki; Haruo Ohashi
- Platform: Super Nintendo Entertainment System
- Release: JP: August 12, 1994; NA: July 1995; EU: October 30, 1996
- Genre: Shooting gallery
- Modes: Single-player, multiplayer

Wild Guns (Note: Wild Guns (Japanese: ワイルドガンズ, Hepburn: Wairudo Ganzu)) is a 1994 shooting gallery video game developed and published by Natsume Co., Ltd. for the Super Nintendo Entertainment System. Set in the Wild West with steampunk and sci-fi influences, the story follows Annie and her bounty hunter Clint, seeking revenge for the death of her family. The player controls either Annie or Clint sidestepping and jumping in the foreground while shooting down enemy robots in the background and dodging enemy bullets. These gameplay mechanics combine elements from third-person shooters and light gun games.

Development lasted five months on a small budget with a team of only three core members and two support staff. The team leads had previously worked together on The Ninja Warriors (1994) for the Super NES, and so chose to develop for that system. Wild Guns was heavily influenced in its gameplay and artistic design by arcade games such as Blood Bros. and Dynamite Duke. The game's scenery, characters, and sound design drew ideas from the Western film genre and the science fiction manga Cobra, creating a space Western setting.

Wild Guns received positive reviews at its initial release, and in retrospective reviews is considered a cult classic. Critics have praised the gameplay of what has become a niche genre, as well as the cooperative mode and graphical attention to detail. The game was rereleased on the Virtual Console for the Wii in 2010 and Wii U in 2014. The game was added to the Nintendo Classics service in 2020. An enhanced remaster titled Wild Guns Reloaded was released in 2016 for PlayStation 4, 2017 for Windows, and 2018 for Nintendo Switch. Reloaded features two new characters which are Doris and Bullet the dog with his sentry drone, additional stages and modes, and updated visuals and audio.

== Gameplay ==
Annie firing at the boss in the first stage

Wild Guns is a shooting gallery game with an American Wild West setting along with sci-fi and steampunk influences. The gameplay combines elements from third-person shooters and light gun games in a similar fashion to Blood Bros. and Cabal. There are six levels, each with two stages, followed by a mini-boss, and a third stage with a final boss. Single player and cooperative modes are available, as well as target practice allowing two players to compete to achieve the highest score. The story follows a young woman named Annie seeking revenge against the Kid family for abducting and killing her family. She seeks help from renowned space bounty hunter Clint. Although Clint says he doesn't need Annie's assistance, she insists, claiming she has a personal vendetta against the Kid family and is a skilled shooter.

The player controls either Annie or Clint in the foreground with the D-pad and must shoot enemies in the background and dodge enemy fire. While holding the fire button down, the D-pad instead makes the gun reticle move. Shooting and moving at the same time is not possible. While the gun is holstered, the player can jump, dive, and roll to evade gunfire. A "Look Out!" text bubble will appear when one can dodge bullets. Some enemies will throw dynamite sticks at the player, but these can be tossed back. A lasso can be used to temporarily stun enemies.

Both enemies and their bullets can be shot down. Defeating enemies will sometimes reveal item boxes, which can hold precious metals such as gold and silver for extra points, and bombs. Only five bombs can be held at a time, which can be used to clear the screen of enemies. Weapon upgrades may appear after defeating certain enemies. These weapons, such as shotguns and machine guns, will increase the player's firing speed or damage output. When a player's bullets hit bullets fired by enemies, a gauge at the bottom of the screen will fill. Once filled, the player will be awarded with a Vulcan gun, the most powerful weapon in the game which grants invincibility. The gauge will then begin to deplete and the Vulcan gun will disappear once empty.

== Development ==
Clint and Annie were designed to be emblematic of the American frontier period.

Development of Wild Guns began when a small team of Natsume staff was asked to create a game quickly and cheaply while waiting for their next major assignment. The team consisted of three core members: Shunichi Taniguchi for game design and graphics, Toshiyasu Miyabe for programming, and Hiroyuki Iwatsuki for sound. Two other people helped as support staff. The team chose to develop for the Super NES because the three had worked together previously on The Ninja Warriors (1994) for that system. Development of Wild Guns lasted approximately five months and was led by Taniguchi.

Wild Guns was heavily influenced by Dynamite Duke and Blood Bros. during development. The space Western setting was largely influenced by the space Western manga Cobra. The screen shaking and mirage-like effects that occur after explosions were influenced by the film RoboCop 3. When composing the music for Wild Guns, Hiroyuki Iwatsuki drew upon the influence of a Western soundtrack "Best Of" CD that Natsume had provided him. He enjoyed listening to the CD both during and after development. The game's music was created using PC-98s, a Roland W-30 keyboard, and a MIDI sequencer. Some sounds came from the Roland Sound Canvas series.

Originally, the reticle could only move up and down, and lateral movement was done by moving the player side-to-side; this, however, proved to be cumbersome and was changed. The "Look Out!" text bubble was added because of difficulty judging bullet distances due to the screen's artificial 3D depth. Clint and Annie were designed in clothing that was emblematic of the time period, and Annie's dress was chosen instead of jeans to avoid overlapping with Clint's design and to enable easier animation. The characters' names were suggested by the American Natsume offices. Due to the game's low budget, voice actors were not used; instead, Taniguchi's voice was recorded in the office bathroom for Clint.

== Release ==
The game was released in Japan on August 12, 1994. The North American version of Wild Guns was set to be released in the third quarter of 1994 and was reviewed at the time, but the release was unexpectedly delayed until the third quarter of 1995. A 32X version was reportedly planned for 1996, but never materialized. The game has since become a rare collector's item. The game was re-released on the Virtual Console for the Wii in 2010 and Wii U in 2014. The game was added to the Nintendo Classics service in 2020.

An enhanced remaster titled Wild Guns Reloaded was released for the PlayStation 4 in December 2016. The game was developed by the original team (as Tengo Project) and features classic characters and stages but also enhancements such as more playable characters, enemies, stages, and local four-player support. The game was made available for download on the PlayStation Store, and physical copies were available from Amazon, Play-Asia, and Video Games Plus. Natsume released Reloaded on Windows in July 2017, marking the company's first ever release for PCs. On April 17, 2018, Reloaded was released on the Nintendo Switch.

== Reception ==
Reception

Review scores
Publication	Score
Electronic Gaming Monthly	8/10 (SNES) (Note: EGM's score is unanimous among 5 reviewers.)
Famitsu	26/40 (SNES); 29/40 (PS4)
GameSpot	8/10 (PS4)
IGN	8/10 (SNES)
Nintendo Life	9/10 (SNES)
Nintendo Power	3.3/5 (SNES) (Note: Nintendo Power provided scores of 3.4 of graphics and sound, 3.1 for play control, 3.4 for challenge, and 3.1 for theme and fun.)
Mega Fun	66% (SNES)
MAN!AC	69% (SNES); 75% (PS4)
Superjuegos	92/100

Contemporary reviews of the game were positive. Famitsu gave it a score of 26 out of 40. Reviewers at Electronic Gaming Monthly cited the cooperative multiplayer mode and challenging levels as the game's strongest points. They declared it one of the best shooters on the SNES and compared it to the Neo Geo game NAM-1975. GamePro praised the game for its intense action, fun cooperative multiplayer mode, colorful graphics, and ability to shoot almost any on-screen object. They remarked that the game is difficult even on easy, but that players are rewarded for perseverance. Nintendo Power found the game to have good graphics and control, and complimented the presence of both male and female playable characters. However, they believed the game was not as challenging as other shooters.

In a retrospective Virtual Console review, IGN's Lucas M. Thomas commended the gameplay depth and the detailed visual presentation. He acknowledged the difficulty, even on easy, but praised the game as one of the best examples of the niche shooting gallery genre. Mat Allen of Nintendo Life found the game to be an excellent example of what the Virtual Console is for: providing gamers chances to experience quality games that were overlooked in their time. He highlighted the release as providing a cheap option to play a game which has become an expensive collector's item. In another retrospective review, Todd Ciolek of GameSetWatch cited Wild Guns as one of the best games in a genre that has become a lost art. Critics and Natsume themselves have acknowledged Wild Guns as a cult classic.

Wild Guns Reloaded was also well received. Critics praised the game for being a quality remaster of an already classic game. Japanese gaming magazine Famitsu gave the PS4 version of the game a score of 29 out of 40.
