= Dynamite Duke =

1990 video game

- Japanese arcade flyer of Dynamite Duke.
- Developers: Seibu Kaihatsu (arcade); Hertz (Genesis); Sanritsu (Master System)
- Publishers: Seibu Kaihatsu (arcade); Sega (Genesis, Master System)
- Platforms: Arcade, Mega Drive/Genesis, Master System, X68000
- Release: Arcade; 1989; Mega Drive/Genesis: JP: 27 October 1990; NA: December 1990; EU: April 1991; Master System: EU: April 1991
- Genre: Shooting gallery
- Mode: Single-player

Dynamite Duke (Japanese: ダイナマイトデューク, Hepburn: Dainamaito Dūku) is a 1989 action arcade game developed and published by Seibu Kaihatsu. It was later ported to the Mega Drive/Genesis, Master System, and X68000. Being a Cabal-based shooter, it can be considered a follow-up to Seibu's Empire City: 1931 and Dead Angle.

== The Double Dynamites ==
The Double Dynamites
- Developer: Seibu Kaihatsu
- Publishers: JP: Seibu Kaihatsu; NA: Fabtek
- Platform: Arcade
- Release: 1989-?
- Genre: Action
- Modes: Single-player, multi-player (max 2)

The Double Dynamites is a version of the original game with simultaneous 2 player support. In addition, there are other changes:

- Life gauges are shown with visible bars, where Duke and bosses all have 11 bars of life.
- In the English version, it is no longer possible to refill the life bar by adding credits after completing Mission 1.
- With the exception of Mission 9, there are more enemies on screen, including boss battles.
- In the high score entry screen, a countdown timer is shown.

== Story ==
Arcade screenshot

A top scientist decides to utilise a secret formula to develop his very own army of evil mutant warriors, so he can become the ruler of the world. It is up to Dynamite Duke--a man with a cybernetic arm and a machine gun--to foil his evil plan.

== Gameplay ==
Packaging for the Genesis version.

The Arcade version has 9 stages, while the Genesis version only has 6 stages.

== Reception ==
Reception

Review scores
Publication	Score
IGN	5/10 (Genesis)
Console XS	77/100 (Genesis); 72/100 (Master System)
Mean Machines	79% (Genesis)
MegaTech	73/100 (Genesis)

In Japan, Game Machine listed Dynamite Duke on their October 1, 1989 issue as being the fourteenth most-successful table arcade unit of the month.

Mean Machines gave the Mega Drive/Genesis version a 79%, commenting that it was only visually better than the Master System version and that it "lacks lasting appeal". Levi Buchanan of IGN rated the Genesis game a 5.0 (Meh) for a dismal value, 30 minutes of play value. MegaTech magazine gave an overall score of 73 out of 100 commenting the game "provides plenty of blasting fun and frolics" and criticizes its lack of challenge. Console XS gave the Genesis an overall score of 77/100 praising the behind the shoulder gameplay perspective and the well drawn enemies although criticizing the gameplay being too easy. They also reviewed the Master system version and gave a score of 72/100 and felt the game was similar to Operation Wolf but with far superior graphics.
