= Blood Bros. =

1990 arcade game

- Developer: TAD Corporation
- Publishers: JP/EU: TAD Corporation; NA: Fabtek
- Director: Hiro Kakiuchi
- Programmer: Dai Kohama
- Artists: Jun Fujisaku; Jun Matsubara; Nao Shishino
- Composers: Yuji Tezuka; Yusaku Aoki
- Platform: Arcade
- Release: 1990
- Genre: Shooting gallery
- Modes: Single-player, multiplayer
- Arcade system: Cabal-related hardware

Blood Bros. (Note: Japanese: ブラッド ブラザーズ, Hepburn: Buraddo Burazāzu) is a 1990 arcade game developed and published by TAD Corporation in Japan and Europe, and later published in North America by Fabtek. It is a spiritual sequel to the 1988 game Cabal, with almost identical mechanics. A bootleg of Blood Bros. is known as West Story.

== Gameplay ==
Gameplay screenshot

In Blood Bros., two blood brothers, a cowboy and an Indian, team up to hunt down "the most wanted outlaw in Dodge City", Big Bad John. The gameplay mechanics are extremely similar to TAD Corporation's earlier game, Cabal, but this game did not seem to have a trackball-controlled variant.

The player's characters are seen from behind. Some screens feature protective walls (which can get damaged and shattered by enemy fire). The players have limitless ammunition for their primary gun, but a limited number of sticks of dynamite, with which they must fend off enemy troops. An enemy gauge at the bottom of the screen depletes as foes are destroyed and certain structural features of the screen (usually the ones that collapse when destroyed, rather than simply shattering) are brought down. At the successful completion of a level by fully depleting the enemy gauge, all the remaining buildings on-screen collapse and the player progresses to the next stage, reprising the amusing "victory dance walk" into the horizon from Cabal. Boss fights, however, start from the beginning if a player dies.

Power-ups appear from time to time, being released from objects destroyed on-screen or special characters who may run across, such as the small Indian Chief figure or warthogs. Points and weaponry can also be dispensed from the tin can, if the player shoots it into the air and juggles it with subsequent shots. Some power-ups give special weapons with increased firepower, others grant extra dynamite or additional points. There is also a game mode that allows two players to play the game cooperatively.

== Reception and legacy ==
Reception

Review scores
Publication	Score
AllGame	1.5/5
Zero	3.5/5

In Japan, Game Machine listed the game on their February 15, 1991 issue as being the tenth most-popular table arcade unit of the month. Likewise, RePlay reported Blood Bros. to be the second most-popular arcade game at the time. In the May 1991 issue of Japanese publication Micom BASIC Magazine, the game was ranked in the number eighteen spot in popularity. Writing for British gaming magazines The One for Amiga Games and The One for ST Games in their May 1991 issues respectively, John Cook compared it to Cabal but praised the graphics and gameplay. Martin Gaksch and Heinrich Lenhardt of German magazine Power Play gave the game a mixed outlook. Brad Cook of AllGame gave the title a negative review. Natsume Co., Ltd. designer Shunichi Taniguchi stated that Blood Bros. and Dynamite Duke served as influences during development of Wild Guns.
