= WinBack =

1999 video game

- North American N64 box art
- Developer: Omega Force
- Publishers: JP/NA: Koei; PAL: Virgin Interactive Entertainment (N64); PAL: Midas Interactive Entertainment (PS2)
- Director: Tomonori Miyazaki
- Platforms: Nintendo 64, PlayStation 2
- Release: Nintendo 64: JP: September 23, 1999; NA: October 19, 1999; EU: July 7, 2000; PlayStation 2: JP: December 21, 2000; NA: March 27, 2001; EU: November 28, 2001
- Genre: Third-person shooter
- Modes: Single-player, multiplayer

WinBack (known as WinBack: Covert Operations in North America and Operation: WinBack in Australia and Europe) is a third-person shooter video game developed by Omega Force (a division of Koei) and published for the Nintendo 64 in 1999, and the PlayStation 2 in 2000. The story follows secret agent Jean-Luc Cougar infiltrating a laser satellite's command center. Gameplay revolves around its innovative cover system, in which the player takes cover behind corners and then ducks out to shoot.

WinBack's cover system eventually went on to influence several later shooters, including Headhunter, Metal Gear Solid 2: Sons of Liberty, (2001) and Kill Switch (2003), which in turn influenced games like Gears of War (2006). The cover system has since become a staple of third-person shooters. WinBack also featured a laser-sight mechanic that was later incorporated in action games such as Metal Gear Solid 2 and Resident Evil 4 (2005), and in turn would also become a staple of third-person shooters. The Nintendo 64 version received its first official re-release on the Nintendo Classics service on October 25, 2021. A standalone sequel, WinBack 2: Project Poseidon, developed by Cavia, was released on April 25, 2006, for PlayStation 2 and Xbox.

== Gameplay ==
The game is a third-person shooter with stealth elements. The player must make use of the cover system to safely shoot various armed terrorists, with a variety of weapons (a sub-machine gun, shotgun, silenced pistol, rocket launcher), all needing ammunition found in the world, however the basic pistol has infinite ammunition. The player cannot move while shooting; instead, the control stick is used to aim, a task made easier by the fact that every weapon is equipped with a laser sight. Lock-on isn't required to shoot enemies, as the laser sight can be aimed freely when in aim mode. Damage to enemies is indicated by three colours, blue to indicate superficial damage to limbs, green for chest for normal damage, and red for a critical headshot. The player can also perform a melee attack while not aiming a weapon, with an instant kill if the enemy has their back turned. The player's movement allows a crouch walk and dodge roll, but is not able to perform actions typical of the action genre such as jumping or climbing over chest high obstacles. There are basic navigation puzzles such as finding keys to progress, and dodging lethal lasers and finding their control box to disarm by shooting.

The game featured a standard multiplayer mode and a Bot mode in the PlayStation 2 version of the game and only in the NTSC versions of the game, where players had access to all of the game's abilities and weapons. At the beginning of the game, all the members of Jean-Luc's team are available as selectable characters, all of them come with a basic handgun as their initial weapon, except for Dan who comes with a unique gun as his main weapon. As the player finished the game or used the cheat code, they will unlock all the bosses and other characters that they had defeated or appeared in story mode. Each boss has a unique weapon that they used in the story mode with infinite ammo.

== Story ==
A terrorist group called the "Crying Lions," originating from the fictional country of Saroczia, takes control of a space-based laser weapon. This is used to attack a military installation housing the controls to the weapon, called the GULF system. The leader of the terrorists calls himself Colonel Kenneth Coleman. The Secretary of Defense contacts the Special Covert Action Team (SCAT) with their orders: Enter the GULF complex and reclaim it. Jean-Luc Cougar is part of the team, and the last to escape the helicopter being shot down. The player takes control of Jean-Luc as he leaps a wall and enters a parking lot. The team is scattered throughout the complex and you must find them and destroy the satellite control center before the GULF satellite laser can recharge and fire again. Along the way you will face a number of laser traps, puzzles, machine gun nests, ambushes, and mazes. You will face a series of bosses culminating in the final boss fight (against Kenneth Coleman's deputy Cecile).

=== Endings ===
There are three possible endings, depending on how long it takes the player (as Jean-Luc) to reach the control room.

Good Ending

After killing Jin, one of the Crying Lions bosses, in the generator room, a confrontation emerges between the remaining active S.C.A.T. team members (Jake, Jean-Luc, and Lisa) and the remaining Crying Lions' bosses other than Kenneth Coleman (Cecile and Deathmask). A shootout erupts during which Jake is killed while Lisa is knocked unconscious and taken hostage by Cecile, who subsequently departs. Jean-Luc and Deathmask fight in one-on-one combat, with Jean-Luc emerging the victor and killing Deathmask, before Jean-Luc gives chase to Cecile.

Cecile, realizing that the Crying Lions' main objective is likely to fail with the S.C.A.T. team having penetrated so far into the facility, betrays and kills Kenneth Coleman, so as to take control of the terrorist group and the weaponized satellite to achieve his own ulterior motives: blackmailing the US government into giving him a large sum of money. However, S.C.A.T. team leader Dan arrives at the control room and seemingly kills Cecile. Lisa regains consciousness and is surprised to discover that Dan is working with the Crying Lions, but is again disabled by Dan after he gives her details of how to destroy the satellite.

Upon reaching the satellite control room, Jean-Luc encounters Dan, who reveals he is a traitor, the killer of both Steve and Thomas and forces Jean-Luc into a confrontation. After a fierce battle, Dan is mortally wounded and tells Jean-luc his reasons for betraying the team: he is half-Saroczian. The war split his family in two, his mother and sister defected to Russia with him in tow, whilst his brother and father joined the Saroczian Revolution. Several years later after the separation, he joined the Army and was eventually sent on a mission by the US Forces to keep the government in power by quashing the revolution supported by a majority of the people. The mission was carried out, but Dan was filled with regrets for which he says fate was responsible. He also met his brother, Kenneth Coleman, leader of the Crying Lions who fought to end the suffering of the Saroczian people and avenge his father's death. Dan subsequently dies of his wounds, and Cecile, who survived being shot by Dan earlier, appears and fights one last battle against Jean-Luc in which he is ultimately killed. Once the confrontation is over, Lisa arrives to discover that both Cecile and Dan are dead. Jean-Luc Convinces Lisa to destroy the GULF satellite, believing it is too powerful for any one country to control. The GULF satellite is destroyed as Jean-Luc, Keith, and Lisa escape, with Operation Winback ending in success.

Normal Ending

The normal ending is similar to the good ending, with a few minor differences.

Jean Luc reaches the area where he fights Jin, but when he does so, Kenneth orders the Pentagon destroyed the satellite, After killing Jin, one of the Crying Lions bosses, in the generator room, a confrontation emerges between the remaining active S.C.A.T. team members (Jake, Jean-Luc, and Lisa) and the remaining Crying Lions' bosses other than Kenneth Coleman (Cecile and Deathmask). A shootout erupts during which Jake is killed while Lisa is knocked unconscious and taken hostage by Cecile, who subsequently departs. Jean-Luc and Deathmask fight in one-on-one combat, with Jean-Luc emerging the victor and killing Deathmask, before Jean-Luc gives chase to Cecile.

Cecile, realizing that the Crying Lions' main objective is likely to fail with the S.C.A.T. team having penetrated so far into the facility, betrays and kills Kenneth Coleman, so as to take control of the terrorist group and the weaponized satellite to achieve his own ulterior motives: blackmailing the US government into giving him a large sum of money. However, S.C.A.T. team leader Dan arrives at the control room and seemingly kills Cecile. Lisa regains consciousness and is surprised to discover that Dan is working with the Crying Lions, but is again disabled by Dan after he gives her details of how to destroy the satellite.

Upon reaching the satellite control room, Jean-Luc encounters Dan, who reveals he is a traitor, the killer of both Steve and Thomas and forces Jean-Luc into a confrontation. After a fierce battle, Dan is mortally wounded and tells Jean-luc his reasons for betraying the team: he is half-Saroczian. The war split his family in two, his mother and sister defected to Russia with him in tow, whilst his brother and father joined the Saroczian Revolution. Several years later after the separation, he joined the Army and was eventually sent on a mission by the US Forces to keep the government in power by quashing the revolution supported by a majority of the people. The mission was carried out, but Dan was filled with regrets for which he says fate was responsible. He also met his brother, Kenneth Coleman, leader of the Crying Lions who fought to end the suffering of the Saroczian people and avenge his father's death. Dan subsequently dies of his wounds, Jean-Luc looks down at Dan's body, asking him if he found the justice he was looking for. He then sadly says if Dan had just told them, they might have found a way to help, but now it is too late, Cecile is presumed to either have died of the wounds inflicted on him by Dan or survived and had gotten away. Once the confrontation is over, Lisa arrives to discover that Dan is dead. Jean-Luc Convinces Lisa to destroy the GULF satellite, believing it is too powerful for any one country to control. The GULF satellite is destroyed as Jean-Luc, Keith, and Lisa escape, with Operation Winback ending in partial success.

Bad Ending

Jean-Luc finds both Lisa and Jake dead in the generator room, both presumably killed by Jin, the elusive (bad ending) Crying Lions boss whom Jean-Luc faces and kills in the generator room should he arrive fast enough (the good ending). Upon reaching the satellite control room, Jean-Luc finds Cecile waiting for him. Cecile tells Jean-Luc that he was too late, the satellite has already fired twice, destroying the Pentagon and White House. Jean-Luc confronts and kills Cecile and goes to the communications room to find Kenneth Coleman, pleased that his "objective" and "cause" was a success. After some talk, Kenneth shoots himself. Jean-Luc and Keith are the only survivors of Operation Winback, which is ultimately a failure.

== Development ==
Gamers' Republic noted that WinBack, along with Dynasty Warriors and Enigma, was an attempt for Koei to branch out from strategy games that they were known for. A gameplay demo of the game was presented at the 1999 Electronic Entertainment Expo and later at the 1999 Nintendo Spaceworld trade show.

== Reception ==
Reception

Aggregate scores
Aggregator	Score	
Aggregator	N64	PS2
GameRankings	75%	71%
Metacritic	N/A	66 / 100

Review scores
Publication	Score	
Publication	N64	PS2
CNET Gamecenter	7 / 10	N/A
Edge	6 / 10	4 / 10
Electronic Gaming Monthly	8.125 / 10 (Note: In Electronic Gaming Monthly's review of the Nintendo 64 version, one critic gave it 8.5/10, and the rest gave it each a score of 8/10.)	7.33 / 10 (Note: Two critics of Electronic Gaming Monthly gave the PlayStation 2 version each a score of 8/10, and the other gave it 6/10.)
EP Daily	5.5 / 10	N/A
Famitsu	30 / 40	30 / 40
Game Informer	7.75 / 10	7.5 / 10
GameFan	(E.M.) 94% 90% (Note: In GameFan's viewpoint of the Nintendo 64 version, three critics gave it each a score of 88, 90, and 92.)	N/A
GameRevolution	N/A	C
GameSpot	6.1 / 10	7.2 / 10
Hyper	92%	N/A
IGN	8 / 10	7.3 / 10
Next Generation	3/5	2/5
Nintendo Power	7.2 / 10	N/A
Official U.S. PlayStation Magazine	N/A	3.5/5

The PlayStation 2 version received "average" reviews according to the review aggregation website Metacritic. Said console version did slightly better than the N64 version, with its improved controls and graphics, but the voice-acting was criticized. The PS2 version also did not release until 2001, while the N64 version was available Holiday season 1999. Chris Kramer of NextGen said of the latter console version, "The action is simple and the environments are not very detailed, but Winback [sic] is fun in an arcade-like fashion." Jim Preston later called the former console version "a game with awkward controls and stiff action set in a boring world of boxes and bad guys. Skip it." In Japan, Famitsu gave both console versions each a score of 30 out of 40.

The D-Pad Destroyer of GamePro said in one review that the Nintendo 64 version was "no Metal Gear 64, nor is it Goldeneye 2 [sic], but on its own merits it'll easily infiltrate the hearts of N64 gamers. With tight controls, decent graphics and plenty of challenges, WinBack should earn a spot on everyone's N64 squad." (Note: GamePro gave the Nintendo 64 version two 4/5 scores for graphics and fun factor, and two 4.5/5 scores for sound and control in one review.) In another GamePro review, Air Hendrix said that the same console version's "addictive, exciting gameplay will be a real treat for action fans—but only for those patient enough to tolerate its frustrating camera work and other flaws. With a little more polish, Winback [sic] could've been a masterpiece, but that shouldn't stop you from enjoying this action-packed firefight." (Note: GamePro gave the Nintendo 64 version 3/5 for graphics, 3.5/5 for sound, 4.5/5 for control, and 4/5 for fun factor in another review.) Extreme Ahab later said of the PlayStation 2 version, "WinBack on the Nintendo 64 was a good, not great, game, and it hasn't been changed enough to warrant a reappraisal of that status—not even the mega-force of the PlayStation 2 helps much. Nevertheless, if you're in need of worthwhile stealth/action, WinBack: Covert Operations will satisfy." (Note: GamePro gave the PlayStation 2 version two 3.5/5 scores for graphics and control, 3/5 for sound, and 4/5 for fun factor.) N64 Magazine gave the N64 version and its import 83%, saying of the latter, "There are no comparable titles on the N64, and even if you might sometimes find yourself wishing that Rare had programmed it rather than Koei, you'll keep coming back to it for one more stealthy killing spree" (#35, December 1999); and later calling the former "a very good game—although not quite a classic—with no real competitors on the N64 or any other system. Original, violent, and extremely enjoyable" (#41, May 2000).
