= Cabal (video game) =

1988 video game

- Japanese arcade flyer
- Developer: TAD Corporation (Note: Amiga and Atari ST versions developed by Ocean France; Amstrad CPC and Commodore 64 versions developed by Special FX Software; MS-DOS version developed by Interactive Designs; NES version developed by Rare.)
- Publishers: Taito: Arcade; JP: Taito; NA: Fabtek; EU: Capcom Amiga, Atari ST, CPC, ZX Spectrum Ocean Software C64; NA: Capcom; EU: Ocean Software NES Milton Bradley
- Composers: NES; David Wise
- Platforms: Arcade, Amiga, Amstrad CPC, Atari ST, Commodore 64, ZX Spectrum, MS-DOS, NES
- Release: September 1988: Arcade; JP/EU: September 1988; NA: October 1988 Amiga, Atari ST, CPC, ZX Spectrum; EU: October 1989 C64; NA/EU: October 1989 MS-DOS; NA: October 1989 NES; NA: June 1990
- Genre: Shooting gallery
- Modes: Single-player, multiplayer

Cabal (カベール, Kabēru) is a 1988 shooting gallery video game developed by TAD Corporation and published in Japan by Taito, in North America by Fabtek, and in Europe by Capcom. The player controls a commando trying to destroy various enemy military bases. The game was only a moderate success in arcades, and became better known for its various home ports.

== Gameplay ==
Arcade screenshot

Cabal has one-player and two-player modes of gameplay. Each player assumes the role of an unnamed commando trying to destroy several enemy military bases. There are five stages with four screens each. The player starts with a stock of three lives and uses a gun with limitless ammunition and a fixed number of grenades to fend off enemy troops and attack the base. The commando is seen from behind and starts behind a protective wall which can be damaged and shattered by enemy fire. To stay alive, the player needs to avoid enemy bullets by running left or right, hiding behind cover, or using a dodge-roll. An enemy gauge at the bottom of the screen depletes as foes are destroyed and certain structures (which collapse rather than shatter) are brought down. When the enemy gauge is emptied, the level is successfully completed, all of the remaining buildings onscreen collapse, and the player progresses to the next stage. If a player is killed, he is immediately revived at the cost of one life or the game ends if they have no lives remaining. Boss fights, however, restart from the beginning if the only remaining player dies.

From time to time, power-ups are released from objects destroyed onscreen. Some power-ups give special weapons such as an extremely fast-firing machine gun or an automatic shotgun with a lower firing rate and larger area of effect. Others grant extra grenades or additional points.

The arcade version is a standard upright cabinet. Each player uses a trackball to move their character from side to side and move the crosshairs about the screen. On later board revisions, a joystick was installed instead with an optional sub-PCB for use with a trackball. With a trackball, dodge-rolling is done by pushing the trackball to maximum speed.

Cabal was somewhat innovative in that it featured a 3D perspective in which the player character was situated in the foreground with an over-the-shoulder camera view, similar to modern third-person shooters. Players cannot move the character while firing (holding down the fire button gives players control of the aiming cursor), and when moving the character to avoid incoming bullets, the aiming cursor moves along in tandem. This creates the need for a careful balance between offensive and defensive tactics, separating Cabal from run-and-gun shooters which relied more on reflexes. Advanced gameplay involves destructible asset management in balancing dodging (which gets riskier as the number of enemy projectiles on screen increases) with the safer alternative of taking cover behind a protective but limited durability wall.

== Ports ==
Amiga box art

Cabal was ported to multiple computers, including IBM PC compatibles, Amstrad CPC, Commodore 64, ZX Spectrum, Atari ST, and Amiga. It was also ported to the Nintendo Entertainment System console by Rare. A version for the Atari Lynx was previewed and even slated to be published in April 1992, but was never released by Fabtek.

When converting the game to the Nintendo Entertainment System, Rare was given a Cabal cabinet but did not have access to the game's source code, so they had to play the game over and over and redraw the graphics from memory. To accommodate the many layers and sprites of the arcade game, programmer Anthony Ball used a common coding trick: swapping sprites from left to right every other frame. This has the negative side effect of causing the sprites to flicker when they reach the console's limit of eight per line, but Ball, like many programmers of the era, found this an acceptable trade-off for including all the game's content, and in a 2016 interview he said he is happy with the quality of the conversion.

== Reception ==
Reception

Awards
| Publication | Award |
|---|---|
| Crash | Crash Smash |
| Sinclair User | SU Classic |
| Your Sinclair | Megagame |

In Japan, Game Machine listed Cabal as the eighth most successful table arcade unit of October 1988.

The arcade version was reviewed by Clare Edgeley in Computer and Video Games magazine. She gave it a positive review, while comparing it favorably with Operation Wolf (1987) and Combat School (1987). Nick Kelly of Commodore User rated Cabal seven out of ten, comparing it favorably with Gryzor (1987) and Devastators (1988).

The ZX Spectrum version won the award for best advert of the year, according to the readers of Crash.

== Legacy ==
The game's success inspired many Cabal clones, such as NAM-1975 (1990) and Wild Guns (1994).

Cabal was followed in 1990 by Blood Bros. with a western theme.

== See also ==
- Shootout (1985), developed by TAD Corporation's related company Data East
