= Enigma (1998 video game) =

1998 adventure video game

- Japanese box art
- Developer: Omega Force
- Publisher: Koei
- Director: Kazuta Imamura
- Producer: Tatsuya Yazaki
- Writer: Kageki Shimodo
- Platform: PlayStation
- Release: JP: April 2, 1998
- Genre: Action-adventure
- Mode: Single-player

Enigma (Note: Japanese: エニグマ, Hepburn: Eniguma) is an action-adventure video game developed by Omega Force and published by Koei for the PlayStation. Set in 1920, the game features three playable characters from England, Japan, and America, who travel the world solving puzzles in various ruins and temples. The game was never released outside of Japan.

== Gameplay ==
Enigma is a single player adventure game with three selectable characters.

== Development and release ==
The game was developed by Omega Force, who had previously developed Dynasty Warriors. During this period, Koei was attempting to branch out from the strategy game genre that they were known for. They produced several games such as the shooting game Winback, the fighting game Dynasty Warriors, as well as Enigma, an adventure game. The game was directed by Kazuta Imamura, while Tatsuya Yazaki served as the producer, and Kageki Shimodo wrote the story. When the game was announced in June 1997 at E3, development was expected to take 9 months, and there was initial plans to localize the game for English markets. At the time, a PlayStation version was confirmed, but there were also the possibility of versions for the Nintendo 64, or Personal Computer as well. A spokesperson for Koei at the time described the game as like "Indiana Jones but with a twist of Resident Evil". The spokesperson also said it was possible that the game could outsell the recently released game Final Fantasy 7.

The game was later shown at the Tokyo Game Show Spring 1998. It was part of over 200 PlayStation games shown at the show, compared to just 16 for the Nintendo 64.

Enigma was released on April 2, 1998, for the Sony PlayStation in Japan and was published by Koei. A 127-page guidebook was published by Koei titled Enigma Hyper Guidebook.

The game has never been released outside of Japan, nor has it been released on the PlayStation's Game Archives in Japan either.

== Reception ==
Reception

Review scores
Publication	Score
Famitsu	25/40
Super GamePower	3.8/5
Joypad	5/10
Consoles+	88/100
Acao Games	9/10

Famitsu gave it a score of 25 out of 40. A reviewer noted that the viewpoint and control scheme is very similar to Resident Evil.

Brazilian magazine Super GamePower gave it a score of 3.8/5.

Joypad gave it a 5/10.

Brazilian magazine Ação Games gave it 9.10, praising the graphics, gameplay, and challenge.
