= Seibu Kaihatsu =

Japanese video game company

- Type: Public
- Industry: Video games
- Founded: 1982
- Defunct: 1998
- Fate: Bankruptcy
- Headquarters: 〒101-0061, 16-5, Mitaka-cho 2-chome, Chiyoda-ku, Tokyo, Japan
- Key people: Hitoshi Hamada
- Products: Raiden series
- Website: seibu-kaihatsu.co.jp (archived)

Seibu Kaihatsu Inc. (有限会社 セイブ開発, yūgen kaisha seibu kaihatsu) was a Japanese video game company known for its shoot 'em up games. The company was founded in 1982 at Chiyoda-ku, Tokyo, Japan as Seibu Denshi Inc. (有限会社セイブ電子), but changed to its current name sometime in 1984. It is currently owned by Hitoshi Hamada.

== History ==
One of their earliest arcade hits was the 1989 rail shooter Dynamite Duke, one of the first to combine close combat with long-range shooting. A year later, Seibu Kaihatsu became best known for their 1990 vertical-scrolling shoot 'em up arcade game Raiden, which was successful enough to earn several sequels and spin-offs in its series of titles. In 1991, a development department known as Rise Corporation (株式会社ライズ) was spun off from Seibu Kaihatsu. During the late '80s, Fabtek bought the rights to internationally distribute Seibu Kaihatsu's arcade titles outside Japan. This partnership started with Dead Angle, which was Fabtek's first game to be released, and ended with Raiden Fighters Jet, which was both Fabtek's and Seibu Kaihatsu's last game to be released.

In 1999, its arcade division vanished and its official website shut down. It was also rumored that they filed for bankruptcy; in fact, Seibu Kaihatsu temporarily disbanded itself. Therefore, Fabtek's international distribution rights expired while closing its business. During the same year, they established Mahjong Cats (開発部門 キャッツ), right before the dissolution of their relationship with adult video game developers h.m.p. and Mink to develop adult mahjong video arcade games.

In 2005, the development staff left Seibu Kaihatsu to apply at MOSS, then bought the development rights to the Raiden franchise from Seibu Kaihatsu to develop Raiden III and Raiden IV in order to keep the franchise's fanbase hyped with Seibu Kaihatsu assisting them.

== Games by Seibu Kaihatsu ==
- Stinger (1983)
- Scion (1984)
- Kung-Fu Taikun (1984)
- Knuckle Joe (licensed to Taito) (1985)
- Shot Rider (1985)
- Wiz (licensed to Taito in Japan, Magic Electronics in US) (1985)
- The Lost Castle in Darkmist (licensed to Taito) (1986)
- Empire City: 1931 / Street Fight (licensed to Taito) (1986)
- Panic Road (1986) (co-developed with Visco Corporation and licensed to Taito)
- Air Raid / Cross Shooter (licensed to Taito) (1987)
- Pop'n Run: The Video Game (1987)
- Mustache Boy (licensed to March) (1987)
- Dead Angle (1988)
- Dynamite Duke / The Double Dynamites (licensed to Fabtek in US) (1989)
- Raiden (1990)
- Seibu Cup Soccer (1991)
- Olympic Soccer '92 (1992)
- Raiden II (1993)
- Zero Team (1993)
- Raiden DX (1994)
- Battle Balls (1995)
- Viper Phase 1 (1995)
- E-Jan High School (1996)
- Raiden Fighters (licensed to Fabtek) (1996)
- Raiden Fighters 2: Operation Hell Dive (licensed to Tuning / Fabtek) (1997)
- Raiden Fighters Jet (licensed to Tuning / Fabtek) (1998)

== See also ==
- MOSS
