= Stinger (1983 video game) =

1983 video game

- Developer: Seibu Denshi
- Publishers: JP: Sigma Enterprises; NA: Venture Line
- Platform: Arcade
- Release: September 1983
- Genre: Scrolling shooter
- Modes: Single-player, multiplayer

Stinger (Note: Japanese: スティンガー, Hepburn: Sutingā) is a 1983 horizontally scrolling shooter video game developed by Seibu Denshi for arcades. Despite the horizontal scrolling, the game has a vertically oriented screen. Hamster Corporation released the game as part of their Arcade Archives series for the Nintendo Switch and PlayStation 4 in July 2025, as well as their Arcade Archives 2 series for the Nintendo Switch 2, PlayStation 5 and Xbox Series X/S in October 2026.

== Gameplay ==
Gameplay screenshot

The game consists of traveling around a space fortress meanwhile shooting aliens and spaceships. An object called "Bongo" could be used as a defense method. This object will shoot itself to the enemies for a few seconds.

== Reception ==
In Japan, Game Machine listed Stinger on their November 1, 1983 issue as being the sixth most-successful new table arcade unit of the month.
