= Shot Rider =

1985 video game

- Developer: Seibu Kaihatsu
- Publisher: Sigma Enterprises
- Platform: Arcade
- Release: June 1985
- Genre: Racing
- Modes: Single-player, multiplayer

Shot Rider (Note: Japanese: ショットライダー, Hepburn: Shotto Raidā) is a 1985 racing video game developed by Seibu Kaihatsu for arcades. Hamster Corporation released the game as part of their Arcade Archives series for the Nintendo Switch and PlayStation 4, as well as their Arcade Archives 2 series for the Nintendo Switch 2, PlayStation 5 and Xbox Series X/S in November 2026.

== Gameplay ==
The player controls a biker who aims to reach the finish line before his opponents. Obstacles such as cars must be avoided while the player navigates rocky terrain and crashes into other bikes to reduce competition.
