= CT Special Forces: Fire for Effect =

2005 video game

- European Xbox cover art
- Developer: Asobo Studio
- Publisher: Hip Games
- Platforms: Microsoft Windows, PlayStation 2, Xbox
- Release: Xbox: NA: March 22, 2005; EU: April 1, 2005; Microsoft Windows: NA: March 24, 2005; EU: April 1, 2005; PlayStation 2: EU: April 1, 2005
- Genre: Third-person shooter
- Mode: Single-player

Counter Terrorist Special Forces: Fire for Effect, known in North America as Special Forces: Nemesis Strike, is a 2005 third-person shooter video game by Asobo Studio for Microsoft Windows and Xbox. Players play as a counter-terrorism agency. The main objective is to dismantle the Nemesis network and get back stolen technology. It is the fourth and final game in the CT Special Forces series.

== Gameplay ==
The player controls two Counter Terrorist Special Forces (CTSF) agents across mission-based, third-person shooter levels where they fight terrorists. The two characters they control are Raptor, who is used for more direct combat-style missions, and Owl, who is used for stealth-oriented sections. The game alternates between Raptor's run-and-gun missions and Owl's more cautious levels, with each character using a shared energy meter differently: Raptor uses it for a rechargeable shield, and Owl uses it for camouflage through an invisibility suit and different vision modes. Missions also include vehicles and free-fall sequences, in which Owl descends into enemy territory while fighting airborne enemies and missions in the air.

== Plot ==
The game follows the Counter Terrorist Special Forces, an international anti-terrorism unit supported by an artificial intelligence system named Thesis. After the World Council moves to reassign Thesis from counterterrorism to military research, the CTSF is soon confronted by a series of coordinated terrorist attacks carried out across Europe and the Middle East. Operatives Raptor and Owl are deployed to respond to hijackings, bombings, missile threats, and fortified terrorist bases, while the attacks increasingly appear designed to compromise Thesis and undermine the CTSF itself.

The terrorists are eventually revealed to be part of the Nemesis Organization, led by former CTSF scientist Gregory Statszeck and supported by a rival artificial intelligence system called Nemesis. As the conflict escalates, the organization targets CTSF senators and launches an assault on the CTSF base in Antarctica. During the attack, Owl is falsely suspected of betraying the unit after communications are disrupted, but Raptor helps clear his name.

The true antagonist is revealed to be Anton Call, Owl’s former partner, who seeks revenge against the CTSF. Owl and Raptor pursue and stop Call, preventing the destruction of the CTSF base. General Banner apologizes to Owl for doubting him and reflects on the bravery of the CTSF’s soldiers.

== Development ==
Early previews noted that CT Special Forces: Fire for Effect was in development with a 2005 release date, and the publisher noted in original releases that it was going to feature multiple characters and vehicles, with a new physics engine compared to their previous releases. The game's Development Director Graeme Boxall noted that they wanted to make the game feel more "high-end" than previous releases in the series.

== Reception ==
The game received mixed reviews from critics, with a 60% on Metacritic based on 10 reviews. GameSpot's Alex Navarro criticized the game, saying that it was a "boring" version of what other games had already done. IGN's Tom McNamara noted that although the game had a higher level of polish compared to other budget European-developed games like Psychotoxic, it failed to meet the mark it was aiming for against classic games like Metal Gear Solid, Kill Switch, and others. TotalGames's Ryan King criticized how the difficulty of the game is created through unfair mechanics, which will make prospective players angry during their playthroughs.
