= Zero Team =

1993 video game

- North American arcade flyer
- Developer: Seibu Kaihatsu
- Publishers: JP: Seibu Kaihatsu; NA: Fabtek
- Platform: Arcade
- Release: JP: May 1993; NA: June 1993
- Genre: Beat 'em up
- Modes: Single-player, multiplayer

Zero Team (Note: Japanese: ゼロチーム, Hepburn: Zero Chīmu), released in North America as Zero Team U.S.A., is a 1993 beat 'em up video game developed and published by Seibu Kaihatsu for arcades. It was released in Japan in May 1993 and North America in June 1993 by Fabtek. It was released by Hamster Corporation as part of their Arcade Archives series for the Nintendo Switch and PlayStation 4 in November 2020.

== Gameplay ==
Zero Team is a beat 'em up in the style of Capcom's Final Fight, where players control the characters Ace, Speed, Spin and Big-O as they navigate six levels and defeat enemies with a combination of punches and jumps. Numerous combos can be executed by holding the joystick in different positions while attacking, resulting in a more varied selection attacks such as a powerful uppercut that leaves the player character vulnerable as well as launching enemies into each other. Weapons dropped by enemies can be thrown, except for a rocket launcher which can be used to one-shot enemies. Each character has a unique special attack is difficult to perform but highly rewarding.

== Reception ==
Damien McFerran of Nintendo Life gave the game a 7/10 score, praising it for its addictive gameplay and multiplayer functionality, though he criticized its forgettable music and its repetition.
