= Dead Angle =

1988 video game

- Japanese arcade flyer
- Developer: Seibu Kaihatsu
- Publishers: JP: Tecmo; NA: Fabtek
- Platforms: Arcade, Master System
- Release: WW: May 1988
- Genre: Shooter
- Modes: Single-player, multiplayer

Dead Angle, released in Japan as Lead Angle (Note: Japanese: リードアングル, Hepburn: Rīdo Anguru), is a 1988 shooting gallery video game developed by Seibu Kaihatsu and published by Tecmo for arcades. It is the follow-up to the company's mobster-themed Empire City: 1931. In Dead Angle, players take control of the game's protagonist, who must rescue his girlfriend from a mob boss. A port of the game was released by Sega for the Master System console. Hamster Corporation released the game as part of their Arcade Archives series for the Nintendo Switch and PlayStation 4 in September 2024.

== Gameplay ==
The player character is represented by a silhouette, which turns red when in the line of enemy fire and is filled with bullet holes as it is shot.

Like Empire City: 1931 before it, players use a joystick to move a crosshair along the screen and shoot enemies. this game adds an on-screen representation of the player character in the form of a silhouette, with an over-the-shoulder view similar to 1980s arcade boxing games (such as Punch-Out and Heavyweight Champ). Multiple enemies now run in front of the player - the silhouette turns red when in the line of fire and is filled with bullet holes as it is shot. Just as in Empire City, players can defend against shots, this time by pressing the duck button, which renders the player invulnerable for a very short period of time. Players start the game out with a standard pistol, but can pick up a tommy gun or a shotgun and use grenades as well. Many of the objects in the background can be damaged or destroyed. The Master System port omits several levels, including the entire Kansas stage. The shotgun and grenades are not available and background objects can no longer be damaged.

Players advance through the various time limited levels, from Italy to New York City, Kansas, then Chicago, by eliminating a set amount of mobsters. The player must then fight the boss of that level. The final boss must be defeated with one precise shot while he uses his hostage as a human shield.

== Reception ==
In Japan, Game Machine listed Dead Angle on their August 15, 1988 issue as being the fifth most-successful table arcade unit of the month.

Seamus St. John complimented Dead Angle's graphics and animation in Computer and Video Games and compared the game favourably to its contemporary Operation Wolf (1987). A capsule review in Advanced Computer Entertainment highlighted the game's fast-paced gameplay and said: "If you want your reactions severely tested, check this one out". Another largely positive review appeared in Your Sinclair, with the largest complaint with the game being the heads-up display. Sinclair User rated the game an 8 out of 10, calling it an "atmospheric 'shoot the target' game with enough variation to keep you coming back for more".

The Master System port was faulted for jerky scrolling in the January 1990 issue of Computer and Video Games. Reviewer Paul Rand said that the slow movement hampered the otherwise fun gameplay and gave the game a 68%. Despite this, Computer and Video Games subsequently published more positive reviews in their Complete Guide to Sega and Complete Guide to Consoles, rating it 83% and calling it an "Operation Wolf-style coin-op" conversion. They lauded the graphics and gameplay, calling it "easily one of the best shooting games on the Sega".
