= CT Special Forces: Back to Hell =

2003 video game

- Developers: Light and Shadow Production; Wizarbox (PS)
- Publishers: EU: Light and Shadow Production; NA: Hip Interactive
- Composer: Martin Schioeler
- Platforms: Game Boy Advance, PlayStation
- Release: Game Boy Advance: EU: July 9, 2003; NA: June 29, 2004; PlayStation: EU: November 28, 2003
- Genre: Run and gun
- Modes: Single-player, multiplayer

CT Special Forces: Back to Hell is a 2003 run and gun video game developed and published by Light and Shadow Production for the Game Boy Advance (GBA). Wizarbox ported the release for the PlayStation, while Hip Interactive published a North American release under the title CT Special Forces 2: Back in the Trenches.

The game is a side-scrolling run and gun shooter, with the player acting as a commando against an army of terrorists. Each mission is completed by defeating enemies with a variety of weapons, and finishing a level-specific minigame. In response to criticism of its predecessor in the series, developers made the game longer, added more animations, and improved the game's password save system.

Back to Hell received generally positive reviews, with critics noting that it was an improvement over its previous entry. Multiple reviewers compared the game positively to the Metal Slug series, while they criticized some control issues and the continued use of password saves.

== Gameplay ==
Each mission contains a unique minigame, such as opening a parachute on time, or holding position in the back of a Jeep.

CT Special Forces: Back to Hell is a side-scrolling run and gun game that was inspired by the Metal Slug video game series, Green Beret, 1943, and other "old-school" games. The player controls an operative acting as an "army of one" fighting an army of terrorists. As players move forward in missions, enemies appear from off screen and within the environment. The player can use the direction pad to move in six different directions, as well as to crouch. Levels also include platform game elements.

The game contains a total of 21 missions, which the player completes by shooting enemies using a variety of weapons. Each mission contains a minigame task, such as opening a parachute on time, or holding position in the back of a jeep. The game also includes missions where the player uses a sniper rifle to shoot enemies from a first person perspective. The GBA version supports co-operative play where players compete against a timer to achieve a high score.

The game includes a number of gameplay enhancements over its predecessor, CT Special Forces. For example, the game adds a player ability to roll, allowing them to enter tight areas. The game also adds a larger amount of levels, a wider variety of weapon choices, and more enemies per level. The new weapon options include knives, as well as tank combat sequences.

== Development and release ==
French video game publisher LSP, which had an extensive history of publishing games in the European market, wanted to create an in-house development studio. The company decided that the GBA's requirement for a small development team would be ideal for its foray into game development. The team originally received a GBA software development kit in mid-2001, and then developed the first game in the series, CT Special Forces, in three months. Back to Hell was completed after an additional six months of work. The team was inspired by the Metal Slug series, Green Beret, 1943, and other "old-school" games that they found lacking in the GBA's library.

After criticisms of the original CT Special Forces, LSP held focus groups with players to determine what to improve. The developers added more levels to address the first game's short length, and increased the number of in-game animations to improve its visual design. The team responded to criticism of the first game's password save system by including more detailed passwords, allowing players to return to individual levels.

In Europe, CT Special Forces: Back to Hell was released for the GBA on July 9, 2003, and for the PlayStation on November 28. While LSP published the European version of the GBA game, there was no simultaneous North American release; North American preview coverage was from imported cartridges. North American publisher Hip Interactive later co-published 16 games from LSP, and CT Special Forces: Back to Hell was released in North America on June 29, 2004.

== Reception ==
Reception

Aggregate score
Aggregator	Score
Metacritic	76/100

Review scores
Publication	Score
GameSpot	7.8/100
GameZone	8/10
IGN	7/10
Jeuxvideo.com	GBA: 16/20; PS: 14/20

The GBA version of CT Special Forces: Back to Hell received "generally favorable" reviews according to review aggregator Metacritic. Critics generally agreed that the game was a marked improvement over its predecessor.

GameSpot's Frank Provo said that Back to Hell was a "spectacular follow-up to the original game" despite his view that it "doesn't really bring anything new to the genre". Nintendojo's William Jacques gave the game a positive review overall, but felt that the game series still needed improved movement and combat upgrades. IGN's Craig Harris said that the game was an "overall more fun experience" than its predecessor. He felt, however, that the game was too short and that it did not incentivize replayability. Eduardo Zacarias of GameZone commented on improvements from the previous game, saying that there was a "nice diversity within the game's levels that makes this sequel superior to the original". Reviewing the PlayStation version, Jeuxvideo criticized the game's short length and lack of multiplayer support, while noting that action game fans might be willing to try the game for its relatively low price.

Several reviewers compared the game to the Metal Slug series, due to its gameplay and visual style. Provo compared both games in the series to Metal Slug, while noting that the graphics had improved over its predecessor. Harris commented that the plethora of minigames made the game feel more like a Metal Slug game because of its increased variety. Zacarias also made positive comparisons between Back to Hell and Metal Slug, noting their similar look and feel. Jacques felt that the game's "bubbly and animated stylization" was more like Metal Slug than other run and gun titles. The game's sound design was praised by both Harris and Jacques, while Zacarias and Jeuxvideo's GBA review both noted that it had not changed significantly since the previous entry.

Both Harris and Zacarias highlighted the weakness of the game's password save system. Harris noted that the system was a weak holdover from the original, calling the mechanic "awkward". Zacarias went further, noting that although passwords are given after each completed mission, old passwords would not allow the player the opportunity to replay previous levels. Jeuxvideo's review of the GBA version instead praised the improvements to the password system, feeling that the updated version in Back to Hell was an improvement over its predecessor. Jacques criticized limitations in the game's control scheme, feeling that the game needed improvements to aiming and movement. Harris called the new roll mechanic introduced "pretty useless" and noted that it made it impossible to jump down from platforms. Zacarias also criticized the game's artificial intelligence, saying that enemies were often not aware they were being shot at.
