= CT Special Forces =

2002 video game

- Developers: Light & Shadow Production (Note: Ported to PlayStation by Similis Software and Denaris Entertainment Software.)
- Publishers: EU: Light & Shadow Production; NA: Hip Games
- Composer: Manfred Linzner
- Platforms: Game Boy Advance, PlayStation
- Release: Game Boy Advance: FRA: July 12, 2002; UK: July 19, 2002; NA: December 30, 2003; PlayStation: EU: 2002
- Genre: Run and gun
- Modes: Single-player, multiplayer

CT Special Forces is a 2002 run and gun video game for the Game Boy Advance and PlayStation developed by LSP Games (Light and Shadow Productions) and published by Hip Interactive. The game spawned three sequels: Back to Hell, Bioterror, and Fire for Effect.

== Development ==
French video game publisher LSP, which had an extensive history of publishing games in the European market, wanted to create an in-house development studio. The company decided that the GBA's requirement for a small development team would be ideal for its foray into game development. The team originally received a GBA software development kit in mid-2001, and then developed CT Special Forces in three months.

== Reception ==
CT Special Forces received mostly above average reviews; it received a 71% and 72% from Metacritic and GameRankings respectively. Most critics noted its similar appearance to the Metal Slug games.

GameZone praised the game, noting that small gameplay details made the game a true "a must have". GameSpot wrote that the game was fun while it lasted, but like most shoot-em-ups, "[the game] is over too quickly". IGN noted the long release gap between the European and North American version, the latter of which was delayed for over a year, and called the game's presentation "dated". Nintendo Power praised the game for its variety between its side-scrolling and overhead gameplay levels, noting its comic-book graphics positively.
