= Empire City: 1931 =

1986 video game

- North American arcade flyer
- Developer: Seibu Kaihatsu
- Publishers: Arcade: JP/EU: Taito; NA: Romstar; Family Computer/MSX; Toshiba EMI
- Producer: Hitoshi Hamada
- Platforms: Arcade; Family Computer; MSX
- Release: Arcade: JP: May 6, 1986; WW: June 1986; Family Computer: JP: December 25, 1987; MSX: JP: 1988
- Genre: Shooting gallery
- Modes: Single-player, multiplayer

Empire City: 1931 (Note: Japanese: エンパイア シティ:1931, Hepburn: Enpaia Shiti: 1931) (known as Street Fight in Germany and the Benelux Union) is a 1986 shooting gallery video game developed by Seibu Kaihatsu and published by Taito for arcades. It was released in North America by Romstar. The game has players taking on the mafia in 1931 New York City by gunning down mobsters one by one.

Versions of the game were released for the Family Computer (1987) and MSX (1988) as Magnum Kiki Ippatsu: Empire City 1931. (Note: Japanese: マグナム危機一髪 エンパイアシティー1931, Hepburn: Magunamu Kiki Ippatsu Enpaia Shitī 1931) Acclaim advertised a release for the Nintendo Entertainment System in Western regions, but the console version remained exclusive to Japan.

Seibu Kaihatsu eventually released a follow-up game, Dead Angle.

== Gameplay ==
Players control the onscreen crosshair and must shoot enemies before the counter on the bottom right of the screen turns to zero.

The game is set in 1931 New York City where the player controls a young FBI agent who is out to avenge his family members, who were killed in a gang shootout. Over a period of several months, he targets mobsters, culminating with the mafia boss.

Players use a joystick to move a crosshair around the screen to aim and shoot at mobsters one at a time. They lurk around various areas, including on the street and in windows. An arrow appears that helps direct players to the location of the next mobster onscreen. Players have a set amount of time to find and shoot each enemy; if time is running out, a speech bubble appears counting down the last few seconds on the timer. When the timer reaches zero, the player is shot and the screen pans to the location of the enemy. A defend button is available as a last resort to avoid being shot. Players can replenish their ammo by shooting hidden ammunition boxes and get bonus points by shooting at gold bars.

Levels are cleared after a set number of mobsters are eliminated. In the game's final level, the player has only one opportunity to assassinate the mob boss as he walks in front of windows in a building. After the final level is completed, the game loops back to the beginning.

The Famicom version is largely the same. The player's progress can be restored any time in the Famicom version by using a password system of four numbers and/or letters.

== Reception ==
In Japan, Game Machine listed Empire City: 1931 on their August 1, 1986 issue as being the fourth most-successful table arcade unit of the month.

A review by Clare Edgeley in Computer and Video Games said the game was "fast moving, with lots of action" and called it an "unusual and addictive game" that was "bound to be a winner".
