= Third-person shooter =

Video game genre

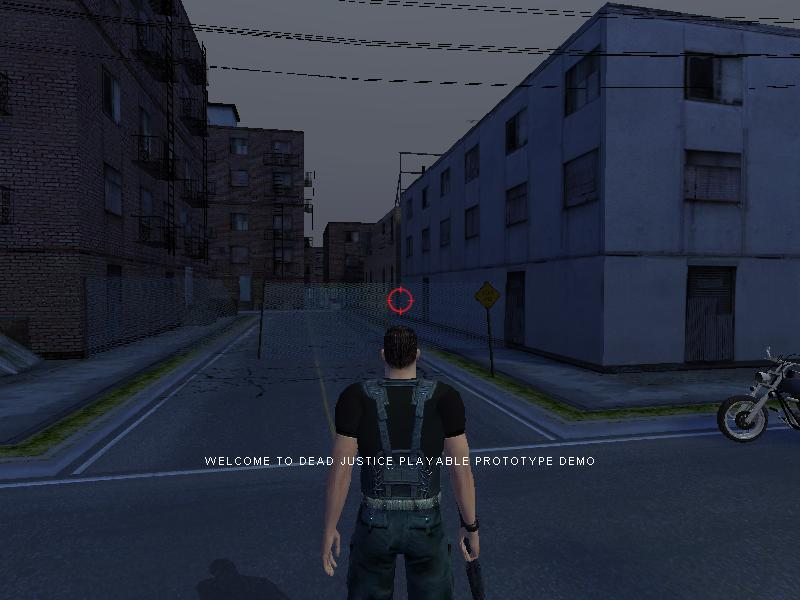
View of a canceled third-person shooter game named Dead Justice

Third-person shooter (TPS) is a subgenre of 3D shooter games in which the gameplay consists primarily of shooting. It is closely related to first-person shooters, but with the player character visible on-screen during play. While 2D shoot 'em up games also employ a third-person perspective, the TPS genre is distinguished by having the game presented with the player's avatar as a primary focus of the camera's view.

== Definition ==
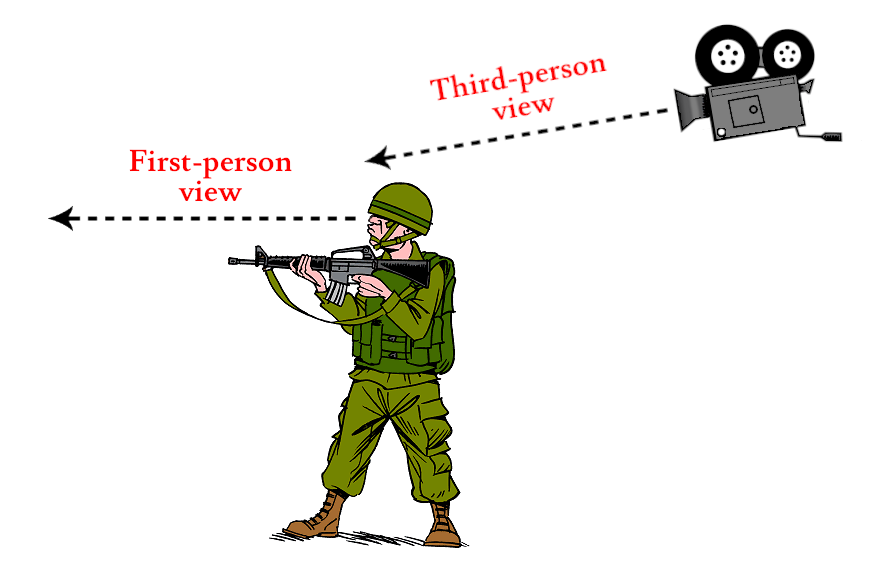
An illustration of a protagonist whom a player controls and a tracking camera just behind, slightly above, and slightly facing down towards that character

A third-person shooter is a game structured around shooting, and in which the player can see the avatar on-screen in a third-person view. Third-person shooters are distinguished from other shooter games that may present the game from a third-person view such as shoot 'em ups, as the game is presented with the player's avatar as a primary focus of the camera's view. Third-person shooters are analogous to first-person shooters in terms of immersion, but simply displace the camera from being at the eyes of the character to a point slightly above and behind them in most cases.

== Design ==
It is a 3D genre that grew to prominence during the 2000s, especially on game consoles. It features shooter game elements, sometimes combining these with the jumping and climbing elements of puzzle-based games and brawlers. Third-person shooter games sometimes incorporate an aim-assist feature to compensate for the difficulty of aiming from a third-person camera. Many include some form of first-person view, which allows precise shooting and looking around at environment features that are otherwise hidden from the default camera. In early examples of the genre, the player would often be required to stand still to use first-person view, but newer titles allow the player to play like a FPS.

=== Relationship to first-person shooters ===
These games are closely related to first-person shooters, which also tie the perspective of the player to an avatar, distinguished only in a minor change of position of the player camera. While the first-person perspective allows players to aim and shoot without their avatar blocking their view, the third-person shooter shows the protagonist from an "over the shoulder shot" or "behind the back" perspective. Thus, the third-person perspective allows the game designer to create a more strongly characterized avatar and directs the player's attention as in watching a film. In contrast, a first-person perspective provides the player with greater immersion into the game universe.

Third-person shooters allow players to see the area surrounding the avatar more clearly. This viewpoint facilitates more interaction between the character and their surrounding environment, such as the use of a tactical system in Gears of War, or navigating tight quarters. As such, the third-person perspective is better for interacting with objects in the game world, such as jumping on platforms, engaging in close combat, or driving a vehicle. However, the third-person perspective can interfere with tasks that require fine aiming.

Third-person shooters sometimes compensate for their distinct perspective by designing larger, more spacious environments than first-person shooters.

The boundaries between third-person and first-person shooters are not always clear. For example, many third-person shooters allow the player to use a first-person viewpoint for challenges that require precise aiming, while others simply allow a player to freely switch between first and third-person perspectives at will. The first-person shooter Halo: Combat Evolved was actually designed as a third-person shooter, but added a first-person perspective to improve the interface for aiming and shooting. The game switches to a third-person viewpoint when the avatar is piloting a vehicle, and this combination of first-person for aiming and third-person for driving has since been used in other games. Metroid Prime is another first-person shooter that switches to a third-person perspective when rolling around the environment using the morph ball. Many games in the genre such as the ARMA series and its descendants (including the popular battle-royale shooter PUBG) allow players to freely transition between first and third-person perspectives at will.

Alexander R. Galloway writes that the "real-time, over-the-shoulder tracking shots of Gus Van Sant's Elephant evoke third-person shooter games like Max Payne, a close cousin of the FPS".

== History ==
2D shooter games have had a third-person top-down perspective since the earliest days of video games, dating back to Spacewar! (1962) and its clones Galaxy Game (1971) and Computer Space (1971).

=== Pseudo-3D shooters (1979–1995) ===
Early arcade shooters with a pseudo-3D third-person behind-the-back perspective include Nintendo's Radar Scope (1979), Atari's Tempest (1981), Nichibutsu's Tube Panic (1983), Sega's Space Harrier (1985), Atari's Xybots (1987), and Square's 3-D WorldRunner (1987) and JJ (1987). Third-person shooters for home computers include Dan Gorlin's Airheart (1986) and Paul Norman's Beyond Forbidden Forest (1986).

Konami's run & gun shooter Contra (1987) featured several third-person shooter levels where the player trudges through indoor enemy bases. Konami's Devastators (1988) is a third-person shooter where, rather than moving forward automatically, the player walks forward by holding the Up direction, as the background slowly scales toward the screen. Devastators also featured various obstacles that could be used to take cover from enemy fire, as well as two-player cooperative gameplay. A similar shooter released that same year was Cabal (1988), which inspired many of its own "Cabal clones", such as NAM-1975 (1990) and Wild Guns (1994). Sega's Last Survivor (1988), released for arcades and then ported to the FM Towns and FM Towns Marty, featured eight-player deathmatch, a third-person perspective, and split-screen multiplayer.

Elite Systems released Virtuoso for PC in 1994 and the 3DO in 1995. This was an early example of a home console third-person shooter which featured a human protagonist on-foot, as opposed to controlling a vehicle, and made use of ray casting along with sprites in a pseudo-3D environment.

=== 3D polygon shooters (1993–present) ===
In 1993, Namco released a two-player competitive 3D third-person shooter vehicle combat game, Cyber Sled. The game is rendered in 3D polygons and is viewed from a third-person perspective by default. Fade to Black (1995) was also a fully 3D third-person shooter, utilising entirely polygonal 3D graphics, but featured an on-foot protagonist rather than a vehicle.

Tomb Raider (1996) by Eidos Interactive (now Square Enix Europe) has been described as a third-person shooter, with Jonathan S. Harbour of the University of Advancing Technology arguing that it's "largely responsible for the popularity of this genre". Other commentators have considered it influential on later third-person shooters such as BloodRayne (2002), The Contra Adventure (1998), MDK (1997), Duke Nukem: Time To Kill (1998), Burning Rangers (1998), and Heavy Metal: F.A.K.K. 2 (2000). The game eschewed the popular first person perspective of games such as Doom, instead making use of "third person" viewpoints, wide 3D environments and a control system inspired by Prince of Persia. Mega Man Legends (1997) by Capcom is another early 3D third person shooter which took a different approach to the genre, mixing this with a role-playing game influence. Around the same time, Deathtrap Dungeon (1998) by Eidos Interactive and MediEvil (1998) by SCE Studio Cambridge (then Millennium Interactive) were some of the first 3D games in the genre to include third person shooter influences in a fantasy setting, with fictional or alternative weapons achieving the same effect as a gun for the player. Die Hard Trilogy (1996) by Fox Interactive was met with critical acclaim at the time of its release, and the section of the game based around the first Die Hard film in the trilogy was another early take on a 3D third person shooter.

Syphon Filter (1999) by Eidetic (now Bend Studio) combined the perspective of Tomb Raider with action elements of games such as GoldenEye 007 (1997) and Metal Gear Solid (1998). Richard Rouse III wrote in Game Developer that the game was the most popular third person shooter for the PlayStation. The Nintendo 64 version of Army Men: Sarge's Heroes by The 3DO Company was released the same year as Syphon Filter, and is an early example of a popular third person shooter which introduced the player being allowed to control aiming of their weapon themselves by means of two control sticks. In Tomb Raider and Syphon Filter, on the other hand, the protagonists automatically aimed at antagonists. Forcing or allowing the player to control aiming themselves, either using control sticks or a mouse, would go on to become commonplace in later games in the genre, such as Oni (2001), Max Payne (2001) and SOCOM (2002). Max Payne (2001) was acclaimed as a superlative third person shooter, inspired by Hong Kong action cinema. Several platform games with third-person shooter elements were also released during that time; examples included Ratchet & Clank and most of the games in the Jak and Daxter series, both of which were designed for younger audiences than most third-person shooters.

Resident Evil 4 (2005) was influential in helping to redefine the third-person shooter genre, with its use of "over the shoulder" offset camera angles, where the camera is placed directly over the right shoulder and therefore doesn't obscure the action. An important gameplay mechanic that helped revolutionize third-person shooters in the first decade of the 2000s was the cover system. Koei's WinBack (1999) has a cover system. Kill Switch (2003) features the cover system as its core game mechanic, along with a blind fire mechanic. Gears of War (2006) employed tactical elements such as taking cover, influenced by Kill Switch, using off-center viewpoints inspired by Resident Evil 4. The game also employed grittier themes than other titles and used a unique feature which rewarded the player for correctly reloading weapons. Gears of War, as well as games such as Army of Two (2008), place a greater emphasis on two player cooperative play, as does Resident Evil 5 (2009). As of 2009, the third-person shooter genre has a large audience outside Japan, particularly in North America. Vanquish (2010) by PlatinumGames featured a gameplay style reminiscent of bullet hell shooters, with bullets and missiles coming from all directions.

The third-person shooter genre is still quite popular in contemporary gaming circles. In 2012, Rockstar Games released Max Payne 3, which was praised for its refined gameplay. In 2015, Nintendo published multiplayer third-person shooter game Splatoon for the Wii U, which was followed by two sequels for Nintendo Switch in 2017 and 2022 respectively, with Splatoon 2 being one of the console's highest selling games and Splatoon 3 becoming one of the fastest selling Switch games. In the late 2010s, the third-person shooter battle royale game Fortnite Battle Royale saw huge popularity. The survival horror games Resident Evil 2 and Resident Evil 3: Nemesis were remade in 2019 and 2020 respectively, featuring third-person shooter gameplay similar to Resident Evil 4.

== See also ==
- List of third-person shooters
- Shooter game
- First-person shooter
