= Devastators =

1988 video game

- Arcade flyer
- Developer: Konami
- Publisher: Konami
- Platform: Arcade
- Release: JP: September 1988; NA: October 1988
- Genre: Third-person shooter
- Modes: Single-player, multiplayer

Devastators (Note: Japanese: 餓流禍, Hepburn: Garuka) is a 1988 third-person shooter video game developed and published by Konami for arcades. It was released in Japan in September 1988 and in North America in October 1988.

Hamster Corporation released the game as part of their Arcade Archives series for the Nintendo Switch and PlayStation 4, as well as their Arcade Archives 2 series for the Nintendo Switch 2, PlayStation 5 and Xbox Series X/S in March 2026.

== Plot ==
Set in 1989, the player takes control of a mercenary duo known as the "Devastators", who are hired by a small undeveloped country to defend their land from a fanatical Middle East dictator threatening to conquer it.

== Gameplay ==
Arcade screenshot

The game is a behind-the-back shooter that moves forward only. The soldier walks straight into the scenery, with a perspective similar to the "3D view" stages of Konami's own Contra (1987) as well as Cabal (1988). What set Devastators apart is that instead of advancing automatically, screen by screen, the player walks forward by holding the Up direction, as the background slowly scales toward the screen. Devastators also featured various obstacles that could be used to take cover from enemy fire, as well as two-player cooperative gameplay.

Most of the missions require the player to kill as many enemies as possible for survival. The missions take place in jungles, desert and sea levels. At the end of each mission was a boss. Mainly the weapons were fairly authentic; the soldier was essentially armed with a machine gun and grenades. He can pick up rocket launchers along the way which could be used against heavy armored vehicles. Additionally, the player(s) have a limited amount of time to complete each stage, otherwise the game will end automatically.

== Reception ==
In Japan, Game Machine listed Devastators on their November 1, 1988 issue as being the third most-successful table arcade unit of the month.
