= Kill Switch (video game) =

2003 video game

- Developers: Namco Hometek; Visual Impact (GBA)
- Publishers: NA: Namco Hometek; EU: Sony Computer Entertainment (PS2)
- Designer: Chris Esaki
- Programmer: Gil Colgate
- Writer: Alvin Muolic
- Composer: Kevin Manthei
- Engine: RenderWare
- Platforms: PlayStation 2 Xbox; Microsoft Windows; Game Boy Advance
- Release: October 28, 2003: PlayStation 2, Xbox; NA: October 28, 2003; UK: February 20, 2004 (PS2); EU: March 17, 2004 (PS2); Windows; January 4, 2004; Game Boy Advance; EU: August 27, 2004; NA: September 9, 2004; UK: October 22, 2004
- Genre: Third-person shooter
- Mode: Single player

Kill Switch (stylized as kill.switch) is a third-person shooter video game developed and published by Namco Hometek for the PlayStation 2 and Xbox. A port for Microsoft Windows was released in 2004 while an abridged Game Boy Advance port developed by Visual Impact was released the same year.

The most distinguishing characteristic of Kill Switch is its cover system, a mechanic that has the player character taking cover behind objects and around corners in a manner similar to Namco's own Time Crisis series of light-gun shooters as well as Koei's third-person shooter WinBack and Hideo Kojima's stealth game Metal Gear Solid 2: Sons of Liberty.

== Plot ==
Protagonist Nick Bishop (voiced by Marcus McCollum) is a super soldier remotely controlled via direct neural connection by a man known only as "Controller" (voiced by Chuck McQuary) in a series of combat missions designed to bring "the North" and "the West" to war. Profiteer Archer (voiced by Adam Baldwin) plans to benefit by selling the technology used to control Bishop, who gives Controller headaches on recollection of suppressed memories featuring a woman and the phrase "Say my name". Moments before launching a biological warhead, Controller is killed by a surge triggered when a woman known as "Duchess" (voiced by Adrienne Wilkinson) seizes control of Bishop. Sent to attack Controller's base, Bishop's memories are eventually restored: the woman from his memories was his new wife, who Archer killed when he captured Bishop to sell the technology inside him. Freed, Bishop kills Archer in a final assault and walks away.

== Reception ==
Reception

Aggregate score
Aggregator	Score			
Aggregator	GBA	PC	PS2	Xbox
Metacritic	67/100	66/100	73/100	75/100

Review scores
Publication	Score			
Publication	GBA	PC	PS2	Xbox
1Up.com	N/A	N/A	N/A	B
Edge	N/A	N/A	6/10	N/A
Electronic Gaming Monthly	N/A	N/A	6.67/10 (Note: Three critics of Electronic Gaming Monthly gave the PlayStation 2 and Xbox versions each a score of 6/10, 6.5/10, and 7.5/10.)	6.67/10
Eurogamer	N/A	N/A	7/10	N/A
Game Informer	N/A	N/A	7/10	7.5/10
GameSpot	N/A	6/10	6.9/10	6.9/10
GameSpy	N/A	2/5	3/5	3/5
GameZone	N/A	N/A	8/10	8.5/10
IGN	7.5/10	7.8/10	8/10	8/10
Nintendo Power	3.3/5	N/A	N/A	N/A
Official U.S. PlayStation Magazine	N/A	N/A	4.5/5	N/A
Official Xbox Magazine (US)	N/A	N/A	N/A	7.8/10
PC Gamer (US)	N/A	70%	N/A	N/A
X-Play	N/A	N/A	4/5	N/A
Playboy	N/A	N/A	75%	75%

Kill Switch received "average" reviews on all platforms except the Xbox version, which received "generally favorable reviews", according to the review aggregation website Metacritic. Criticism was directed towards its thin plot and simplistic level design, while the gameplay mechanics, especially the cover system, were lauded and considered engaging. It was compared to the Time Crisis series. The Xbox version was said to possess enhanced graphics over the PS2 version. GamePro said of the former console version, "Barring some stiff animation and occasional collision-detection fumbles, kill.switch's textures and character models are the stuff. The controls take a while to master, but once you do, they are super slick. Some of the voice acting is pretty haggard, but overall the sound is muscular. A mega effort." (Note: GamePro gave the Xbox version two 4/5 scores for graphics and fun factor, 3.5/5 for sound, and 4.5/5 for control.) 1Up.com gave the Xbox version a B, praising the game's simple but fun game, and said, "Cover is everything here—you enter a room, hide behind a television, shoot two or three enemies who have comical accents, enter the next room, and repeat several dozen times. It's hardly original (not to mention short and sometimes ugly), but Namco's got both the control and the difficulty level just right."

== Legacy ==
The 'Offensive Cover System' (OCS) in the game was one of the foundations for modern cover systems in third-person shooter video games.

Kill Switch is best remembered for its cover system as a core game mechanic, and for introducing the blind fire mechanic to the cover system. Several shooters took inspiration from Kill Switch and implemented similar cover systems. In the design of Gears of War, lead developer Cliff Bleszinski of Epic Games credits Kill Switch's cover system as one of the influences they put into the game's design, as its lead designer Chris Esaki was employed by Epic Games and was involved in the development of Gears of War.

Naughty Dog's Uncharted: Drake's Fortune, which began development in 2005 and was released in 2007, also took inspiration from Kill Switch, which Uncharted's lead designers Evan Wells and Amy Hennig credited as inspiration for the game's cover system. Other examples of shooters that featured Kill Switch-inspired cover systems include the 2005 third-person shooter CT Special Forces: Fire for Effect, and the 2006 games Tom Clancy's Rainbow Six: Vegas, a first-person shooter released in the same month as Gears of War, and Killzone: Liberation, an isometric shooter released a month before Gears of War.
