= WinBack 2: Project Poseidon =

2006 video game

- North American box art
- Developer: Cavia, Inc.
- Publisher: Koei
- Director: Takehiko Kubokawa
- Platforms: PlayStation 2, Xbox
- Release: NA: 25 April 2006; EU: 16 June 2006; AU: 29 June 2006; JP: 29 June 2006 (PS2)
- Genre: Third-person shooter
- Modes: Single-player, multiplayer

WinBack 2: Project Poseidon (ウィンバック 2 Project Poseidon, Winbakku Tsū Purojekuto Posaidon), known in Europe as Operation WinBack 2: Project Poseidon, is a third-person shooter video game and the second game of the WinBack series. It was developed by Cavia and published by Koei for the PlayStation 2 and Xbox game consoles in 2006.

== Plot ==
A rogue U.S. Special Forces unit dubbed "Black Hand" has joined forces with a terrorist group called "The Minutemen." Together they have taken control of a vast nuclear arsenal in a top secret military installation at sea and seized the activation codes for a weapon known only as "Project Poseidon." The fate of the world hangs by a thread, and a few ticks of the clock means the difference between justice and annihilation. The player controls one or two of the three CRT (Crisis Response Team) members. Led by CO Jack Walcott, the new WinBack assault team is composed of three young, yet combat-proven, operatives led by Craig Contrell. Each team member is qualified in six different weapon types and highly-adept at close quarters combat (CQC). The player's objective is to complete 30 missions of action, strategy, stealth, rescuing, escorting, and various types of essential goals to stop the terrorists.

== Gameplay ==
WinBack 2 is a third-person shooter game.

Besides a graphical update and new cast of characters, the major new feature in this game is playing as two different characters per level. The player operates as a Route A person and a Route B person, e.g. Craig and Mia, Nick and Craig, etc. The partner in Route A offers a supporting role to the main partner in Route B, to unlock doors and assist in eliminating enemies for their benefit. After finishing each level for the first time, the player goes through it a second time as the partner.

Rankings ranging from A-D are given at the end of the level based on Time (time taken to finish a stage), Arrests (the number of hostiles taken into custody rather than simply killed), and CRT Points (which work as a points-based health system as well as being awarded to the player for rescuing hostages/helping your partner on the parallel route).

The player does not have unlimited pistol ammunition, unlike in Winback. Various weapons are found either on a character from the beginning or from arrested enemies. Weapons include machine gun, sniper rifle, grenades, claymores, and so on.

== Development ==
The game was developed by Cavia, inc., a different company than that which produced the original WinBack. However, WinBack 2 was still published by Koei, like the original. The graphics were updated.

== Reception ==
Reception

Aggregate score
Aggregator	Score	
Aggregator	PS2	Xbox
Metacritic	48 / 100	52 / 100

Review scores
Publication	Score	
Publication	PS2	Xbox
Electronic Gaming Monthly	3.83 / 10	3.83 / 10
Eurogamer	5 / 10	N/A
Famitsu	28 / 40	N/A
Game Informer	4 / 10	4 / 10
GamePro	3/5	3/5
GameSpot	N/A	4.9 / 10
GameSpy	2/5	2/5
GameTrailers	4.7 / 10	4.7 / 10
GameZone	4.8 / 10	5 / 10
IGN	4.4 / 10	4.4 / 10
Official U.S. PlayStation Magazine	2/5	N/A
Official Xbox Magazine (US)	N/A	3.5 / 10

The Xbox version received "mixed" reviews, while the PlayStation 2 version received "generally unfavourable reviews", according to the review aggregation website Metacritic. Due to the fact that gameplay deviates greatly from the previous entry, critical reception of the game was mediocre at best.

In particular, the 'Route' based system of gameplay for Winback 2 was greatly criticised. Game reviewers stated that the process becomes drawn-out, tiresome, and even annoying in the later stages. The review from GameTrailers was particularly harsh on the lack of fun they derived from both the multiplayer and the random deaths of the 30-level single-player campaign. In Japan, Famitsu gave the PS2 version all four sevens for a total of 28 out of 40.
