= Battle Balls =

1995 video game

- North American arcade flyer
- Developer: Seibu Kaihatsu
- Publishers: JP: Nihon System; NA: Fabtek; JP: Seibu Kaihatsu (PlayStation)
- Designer: Takayuki Saito
- Platforms: Arcade, PlayStation
- Release: JP: October 1995; NA: January 1996
- Genre: Puzzle
- Modes: Single player, Multiplayer

Battle Balls (Note: Japanese: 戦球, Hepburn: Senkyu) is a 1995 puzzle video game developed by Seibu Kaihatsu for arcades. It was released in Japan by Nihon System in October 1995 and in North America by Fabtek in January 1996. A version for the PlayStation titled Mezase! Senkyu-Ou (Note: Japanese: めざせ！戦球王) was later released in April 19, 1996 as limited quantities for the Japanese market and the reprint version released on August 5, 1999. A demo version of the game was also included in the PlayStation release of Raiden DX. Hamster Corporation released the game as part of their Arcade Archives series for the Nintendo Switch and PlayStation 4 in March 2025.

== Gameplay ==
In Senkyu, balls are affected by gravity, causing them to fall if there's open space, such as when balls are cleared

The game consists of three colored balls that can be rotated clockwise or anti-clockwise falling from the top of the screen. When they collect with four or more like-colored balls on the pile at the bottom of the screen they disappear and the surrounding balls fall to fill in the space. Bonus points are awarded for completing combos, chain-reactions caused by the falling balls. The game ends when the pile reaches the top of the screen.

== Reception ==
In Japan, Game Machine listed Senkyu on their December 1, 1995 issue as being the ninth most-successful arcade game of the month.

== Sequels ==
In 2001, Seibu Kaihatsu released two new versions of Senkyu named Gravure Collection and Pakkun Ball TV respectively. Both are strictly single player games and feature live-action video clips. The gameplay remains the same, but the background is a display of a static video image. When balls are matched and disappear the background video is advanced. A timer counts down the length until the end of the level and once a level is completed the player is rewarded with a short video before the next level begins.
