= NAM-1975 =

1990 video game

- North American arcade flyer
- Developer: SNK
- Publisher: SNK
- Producer: Eikichi Kawasaki
- Composer: Yoko Osaka
- Platforms: Arcade, Neo Geo AES, Neo Geo CD
- Release: Arcade: WW: April 26, 1990; Neo Geo AES: WW: July 1, 1991; Neo Geo CD: JP: September 9, 1994; NA: October 1996
- Genre: Shooting gallery
- Modes: Single-player, multiplayer
- Arcade system: Neo Geo MVS

NAM-1975 (Note: Japanese: ナム1975, Hepburn: Namu-Ichikyūnanago) is a 1990 shooting gallery video game developed and published by SNK for the Neo Geo arcade and home systems. It was one of the launch titles for the MVS (on which it was a pack-in title), as well as its home counterpart, the Neo Geo AES, which launched in 1991. It is also the only Neo Geo title to not feature the Neo Geo boot screen in its attract mode. Set in 1975 during the final months of the Vietnam War, the game follows American soldiers Silver and Brown, who return to Vietnam in order to rescue kidnapped ex-U.S. Army scientist Dr. R. Muckly and his daughter Nancy, while also trying to learn about those responsible for the act.

NAM-1975 received positive reception from critics upon its release. Praise was given to the graphics and digitized voice samples, while some reviewers were divided in regards to the gameplay, and criticism was leveled at the music and difficulty. Retrospective reviews for the game have also been positive, with many praising the gameplay but criticizing its short length. NAM-1975 was later re-released for the Neo Geo CD in 1994, and has since made appearances on download services for various consoles.

== Gameplay ==
Gameplay screenshot showcasing the first stage in single-player mode. From top to middle, the game's interface displays the total score of the player, remaining number of lives, high-score and currently equipped subweapon.

NAM-1975 is a shooting gallery game similar to Cabal and Dynamite Duke, where players control soldiers Silver (player one) and Brown (player two) across six stages that take place during the final months of the Vietnam War and defeat the bosses of each level in order to progress through the game. In addition to the single-player mode, the game also features a two-player cooperative multiplayer mode.

The joystick moves both the soldier and the crosshair left and right of the area. The "A" button is used for firing the main weapon where the crosshair is positioned and when held down, players can move the crosshair while keeping the soldiers in the same spot. The "B" button is used to throw grenades into the position of the crosshair, while the C button enables players to move the soldiers faster to avoid enemy fire when held down. If the joystick is pulled diagonally when running, the soldiers will perform an evasive roll that prevents them from being killed, in addition of dodging enemy fire as well. Once all lives are lost, the game is over unless players insert more credits into the arcade machine to continue playing. If a memory card is present, the player is allowed to save their progress and resume into the last stage the game saved at.

Like many earlier games released by SNK, it is well known for its high difficulty, with the final boss being particularly infamous among players for disabling continues after reaching the end of the last stage and if the players are killed during this battle, it will automatically trigger the bad ending, forcing to restart the game from the beginning in order to achieve the good ending.

Both players begin the game with a standard machine gun with infinite ammo and ten grenades. When certain enemies are killed or certain building structures are brought down, they will drop guns, grenades or other items that can be collected, such as points or 1UPs. The guns that can be picked up during gameplay consists of the Balcan (a more powerful machine gun), a flamethrower capable of only taking out ground units and a missile launcher, while the other grenade-type weapons that can be collected are the spark and napalm bombs. If the players save a female hostage from the enemy, the hostage (named Chris) will help players by shooting at enemies, until the player who rescued her is killed or reaches the end of the area. On occasions, the players are sent into a boss round that takes place in between stages.

== Plot ==
"The roar of the helicopters overhead snaps us back into reality. We will never forget the nightmare of that summer..." these were the phrases that started the story of Silver and Brown, two American soldiers who were recalled back to the Natorm headquarters in the summer of 1975, during the final months of the Vietnam War, in order to rescue the ex-U.S. Army scientist Dr. R. Muckly, who was kidnapped and presumably imprisoned in the interior of Vietnam by North Side terrorists, as part of an organized special forces unit. The team proceeds with the mission by going up to Yan river on a boat in order to deceive enemy guard, but their operations are quickly sighted by the terrorists. As a result, the team abandons the boat and they get across Da Nang city to continue the operation, wondering how their plan was figured out by the enemy and after doing so, the team receives a new strategy plan from the headquarters, informing them to aboard an allied plane in order to invade the enemy airport by parachuting, but the enemy intercepts them in the air and the soldiers begin defending themselves by shooting at the upcoming enemy planes.

Once the team arrive safely into the airport, the soldiers proceed to continue the mission by assaulting the complex, now realizing that there is a spy among them but after the assault of the enemy airport, their communication systems were intercepted by the terrorists and the captain of the unit informed to the soldiers that Nancy, the daughter of Muckly, was also taken away alongside his father and gave the team new orders to enter into enemy arms factory. Soon after, the team come across with Nancy, who tries to inform them about the true head of the operation before she is killed by an enemy shot on her back.

After capturing an enemy commander, the soldiers proceed to interrogate him about how their plan was quickly found out but the commander is then killed by a sniper, but not before informing the armies that Muckly is a madman who is constructing a large laser cannon to take over the world himself. Despite the intense firepower of the weapon, the troops defeat Muckly and save the world, with the special forces now being regarded as heroes but the war continues in Vietnam.

== Development and release ==
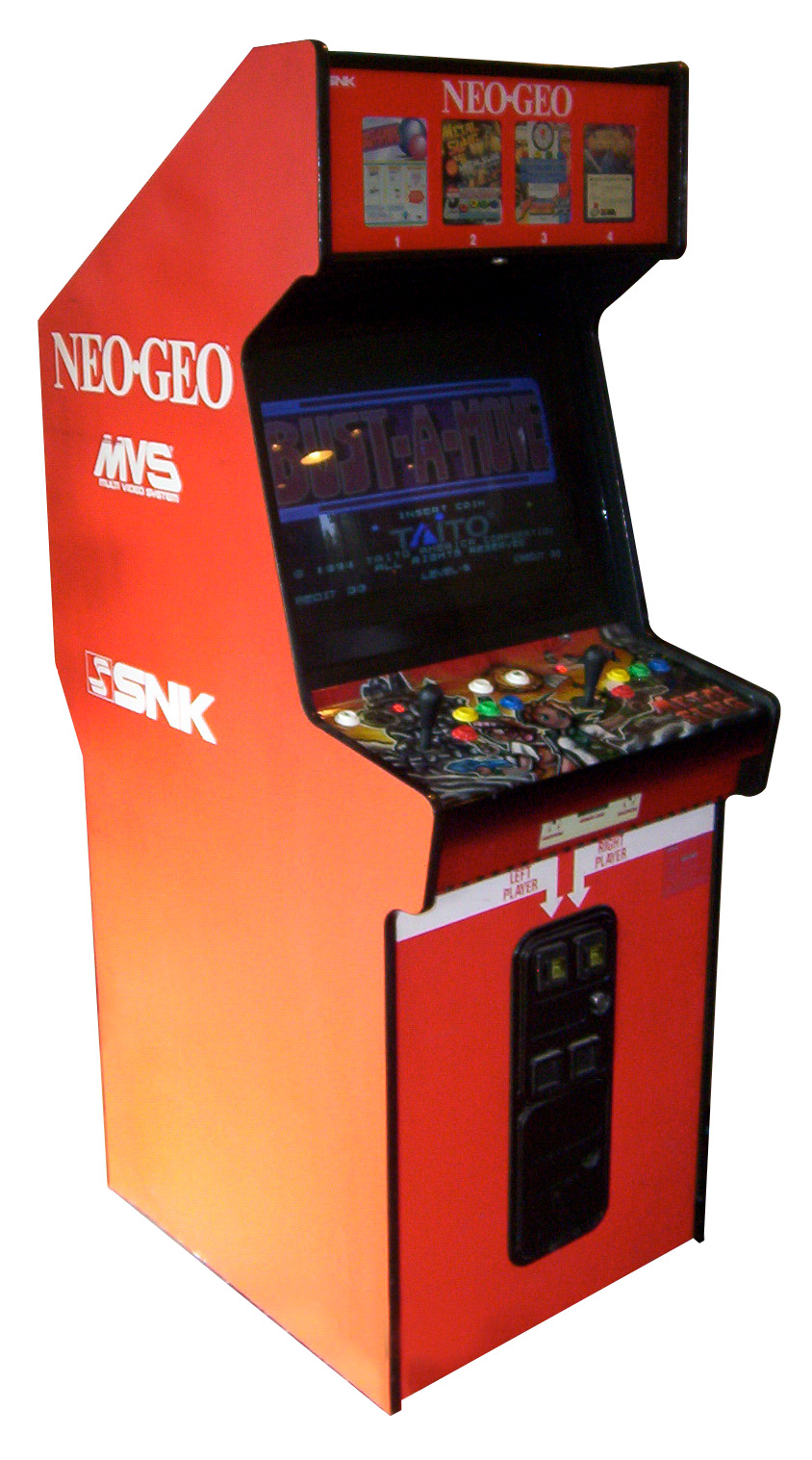
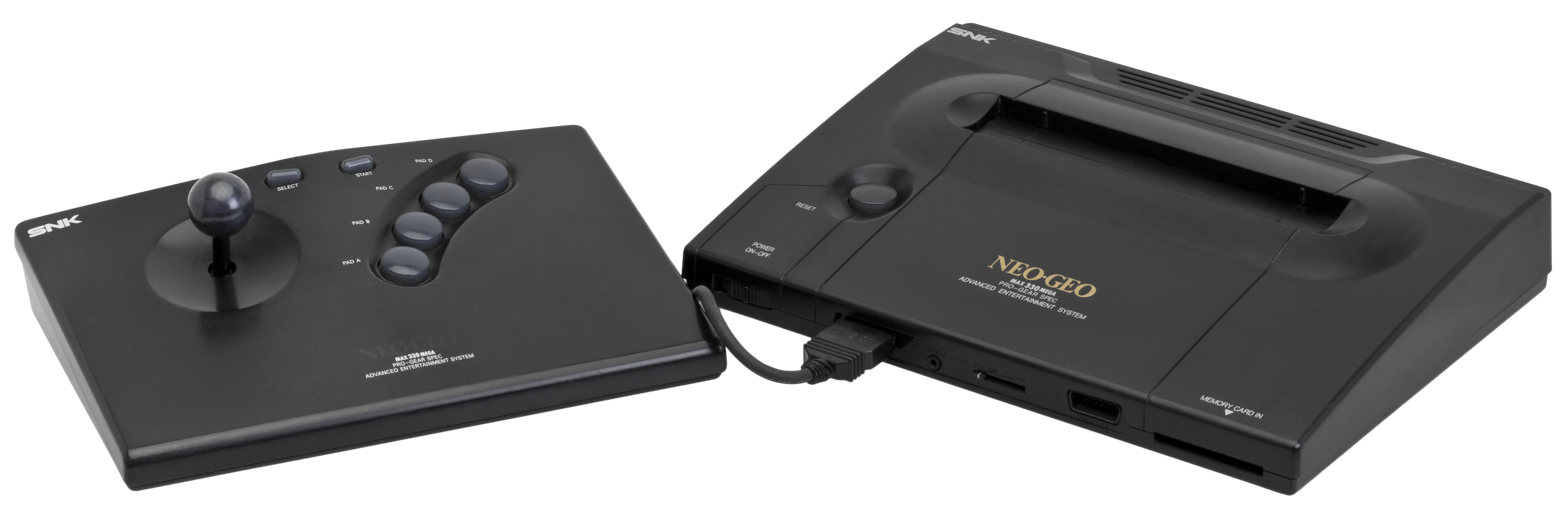
NAM-1975 was one of the first games released for the Neo Geo MVS (left) and Neo Geo AES (right).

NAM-1975 holds the distinction for being one of the first, if not the first game to be developed for the Neo Geo platform, in addition to being the only title in the system's library that does not feature the Neo Geo boot screen in its attract mode. There are many references to many famous Vietnam War films in the game such as Apocalypse Now and Full Metal Jacket, especially the latter, with the attract sequence showing one of the characters firing off an M60 machine gun being a clear portray of the shot of Animal Mother firing on the VC sniper in the latter film. The game was also showcased for the first time in North America during the 1990 ACME show in Chicago.

NAM-1975 was initially launched for arcades on the Neo Geo MVS system on April 26, 1990. Around the same time, it was also released for the Neo Geo AES home system, which was initially available only to rent or buy before its eventual retail release on July 1, 1991. On September 9, 1994, the game was re-released as a launch title for the Neo Geo CD, with minimal changes from the original MVS and AES versions. The game has since been released on the Wii Virtual Console. Hamster Corporation re-released the game as part of their ACA Neo Geo series for the PlayStation 4, Xbox One, Nintendo Switch, Windows, Android and iOS. It was also one of the 20 pre-loaded games included on the Neo Geo X.

=== Controversy ===
When the Neo Geo AES version was originally launched in Europe, the cover art of copies released in the region were subsequently censored due to the female character on the front having a bare thigh and cleavage exposed. As such, many cartridges have a black mark over the exposed parts with a permanent marker to disguise it for overseas marketing.

== Reception ==
Contemporary reception

Aggregate score
| Aggregator | Score |
|---|---|
| GameRankings | (Neo Geo) 70% |

Review scores
| Publication | Score |
|---|---|
| AllGame | (Neo Geo) |
| CVG Mean Machines | (Neo Geo) 71% |
| Consolemania | (Neo Geo) 90 / 100 |
| GameFan | (Neo Geo) 364 / 400 |
| The Games Machine | (Neo Geo) 81% |
| GamePro | (Neo Geo) 21 / 25 |
| Hobby Consolas | (Neo Geo) 90 / 100 |
| Hobby Hi-Tech | (Neo Geo CD) 5 / 10 |
| Joystick | (Neo Geo) 96% (Neo Geo) 92% |
| Mega Fun | (Neo Geo) 85% (Neo Geo) 85% |
| Micom BASIC Magazine | (Neo Geo) |
| Neo Geo Freak | (Arcade) 7 / 20 |
| Superjuegos | (Neo Geo) 81,2 / 100 |

Award
| Publication | Award |
|---|---|
| Electronic Gaming Monthly (2006) | #194 Top 200 Best Games of All Time (Neo Geo) |

In Japan, Game Machine listed NAM-1975 as the 22nd most successful table arcade unit of December 1990, outperforming titles such as Out Zone. The game received positive reception from critics when it was originally released. In June 1999, Super Teeter of GameFan gave a positive outlook on the game, praising various aspects but also pointing out the high difficulty level.

=== Retrospective reviews ===
Retrospective assessments

Review scores
| Publication | Score |
|---|---|
| Nintendo Life | (Wii) 7 / 10 |
| Nintendo World Report | (Switch) 7 / 10 |
| Bonus Stage | (Switch) 6 / 10 |
| Cubed3 | (Switch) 8 / 10 |
| Digitally Downloaded | (Switch) |

In recent years, NAM-1975 has received positive reception from critics. In 2006, Electronic Gaming Monthly ranked it number 194 on their list of "The Greatest 200 Videogames of Their Time". In 2014, HobbyConsolas named it one of the twenty best games for the Neo Geo AES.
