= Shootout (1985 video game) =

- North American arcade flyer
- Developer: Data East
- Publisher: Data East
- Platform: Arcade
- Release: JP: July 1985; NA: September 16, 1985; EU: October 1985
- Genre: Shooting gallery
- Modes: Single-player, multiplayer

Shootout (Note: Japanese: シュートアウト, Hepburn: Shūtoauto) is a 1985 shooting gallery game developed and published by Data East for arcades.

== Gameplay ==
The player controls with two buttons and an 8-way joystick. One button shoots the gun, the other allows the player to jump enemy bullets and other attacks. The 8-way joystick is used to specify the direction of movement, pointing down to crouch and the different up directions to indicate angle of the shot.

At the start of the game, the player is given an option to practice in the target practice room, which is similar to a standard shooting gallery game with targets that don't fire back. They then play through the main game, consisting of 7 stages to beat the game. In the main game, the player faces human enemies who fire back at the player, often while taking cover behind objects/buildings and popping out from behind cover to fire at the player.

The game will loop after the 7th stage is completed. In stages 1 through 8, the object is to shoot a certain number of criminals and avoid shooting civilians. If the player is hit by an enemy or if the player shoots a civilian, the player will lose a life. When all lives are lost, the game ends. Besides criminals and civilians, some objects in the backgrounds of the seven stages can be shot to earn extra points, such as amusement park rides and signs.

== Technical specifications ==
The following are the technical specifications for the game's arcade hardware.

- Main CPU : M6502 (@ 2 MHz)
- Sound CPU : M6502 (@ 1.5 MHz)
- Sound Chips : YM2203 (@ 1.5 MHz)
- Screen orientation : Horizontal
- Video resolution : 256 x 240 pixels
- Screen refresh : 60.00 Hz
- Palette Colors : 256
- Players : 2
- Control : 8-way joystick
- Buttons : 2

== Reception ==
In Japan, Game Machine listed Shootout on their August 15, 1985 issue as being the tenth most-successful table arcade unit of the month.

Mike Roberts and Steve Phipps of Computer Gamer magazine reviewed the game, giving it a positive review, calling it "a target shooting game with a difference." They noted that, in contrast to a standard shooting gallery with targets that don't fire back, the enemies in Shoutout fire back at the player while often taking cover and popping out from cover.

Clare Edgeley of Computer and Video Games magazine gave it a positive review. She noted the enemies "crop up in the most unexpected places" and said it was "as much fun as" Sega's Bank Panic (1984) and Nintendo's Hogan's Alley (1984). She concluded, "Take your pick, all three are great fun."
