= Shooter game =

Action video game genre

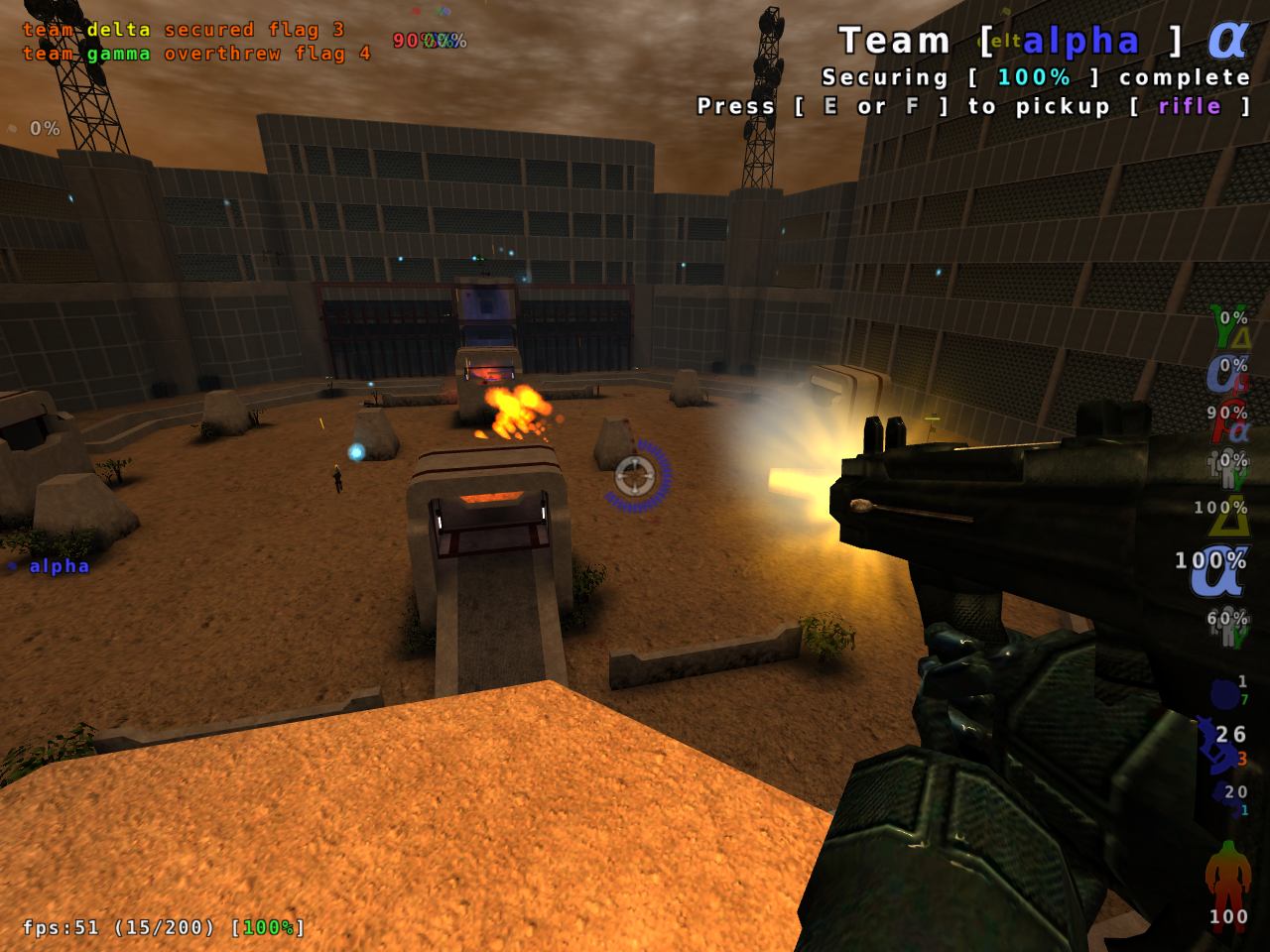
Gunfire in the first-person shooter Blood Frontier

Shooter video games, or shooters, are a subgenre of action video games where the focus is on the defeat of the character's enemies using ranged weapons given to the player. Usually these weapons are firearms or some other long-range weapons, and can be used in combination with other tools such as grenades for indirect offense, armor for additional defense, or accessories such as telescopic sights to modify the behavior of the weapons. A common resource found in many shooter games is ammunition, armor or health, or upgrades which augment the player character's weapons.

Shooter games test the player's spatial awareness, reflexes, and speed in both isolated single player or networked multiplayer environments. Shooter games encompass many subgenres that have the commonality of focusing on the actions of the avatar engaging in combat with a weapon against both code-driven NPC enemies or other avatars controlled by other players.

== Subgenres ==
=== Shoot 'em up ===
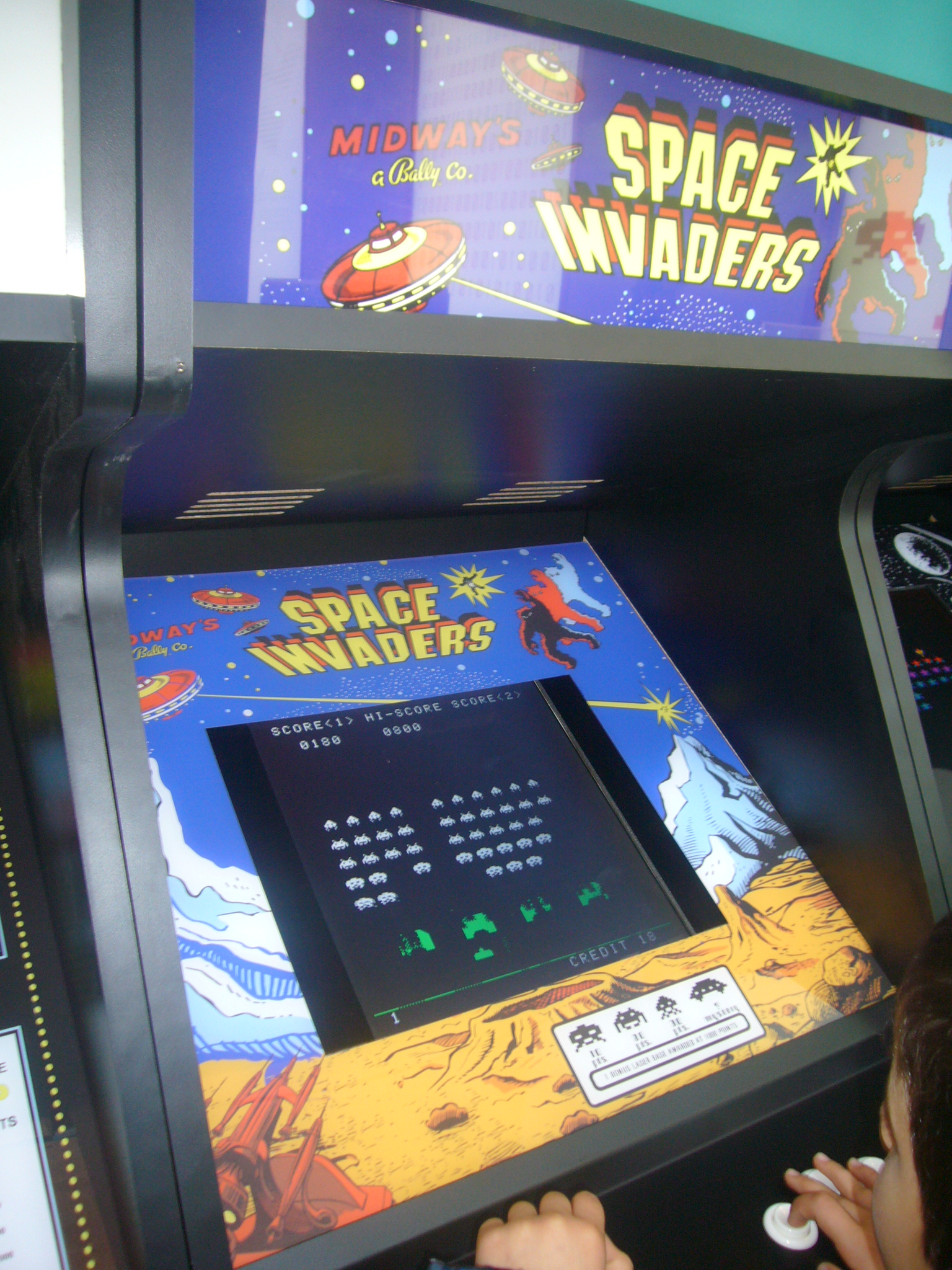
Space Invaders (1978), an arcade video game that defined the shoot 'em up genre

Shoot 'em ups (also known as shmups) are a subgenre of shooters wherein the player may move, up, down, left or right around the screen, typically firing straight forward.

Shoot 'em ups share common gameplay, but are often categorized by viewpoint. This includes fixed shooters on fixed screens, such as Space Invaders and Galaxian; scrolling shooters that mainly scroll in a single direction, such as Xevious and Darius; top-down shooters (sometimes referred to as twin-stick shooters) where the levels are controlled from an overhead viewpoint, such as Bosconian and Time Pilot; rail shooters where player movement is automatically guided down a fixed forward-scrolling "rail", such as Buck Rogers: Planet of Zoom and Space Harrier; and isometric shooters which use an isometric perspective, such as Zaxxon and Viewpoint.

==== Run and gun ====
Run and gun video games are 2D scrolling action games in which the protagonists fight on foot, often with the ability to jump. Run and gun games may use side-scrolling, vertical scrolling or isometric viewpoints and may feature multidirectional movement.

Top-down run and gun games use an overhead camera angle that shows players and the areas around them from above. Notable games in this category include Commando, Ikari Warriors, Shock Troopers and Shock Troopers: 2nd Squad.

Side-scrolling run and gun games combine elements of both shoot 'em up and platform games, while the player characters move and jump around shooting with various guns and other long-range weapons. These games emphasize greater maneuvering or even jumping, such as Green Beret, Thexder, Contra and Metal Slug.

=== Shooting gallery ===
Shooting gallery games (also known as "target shooting" games) are a sub-genre of shooters where the player aims at moving targets on a stationary screen. They are distinguished from rail shooters, which move the player through levels on a fixed path, and first-person shooters, which allow player-guided navigation through a three-dimensional space.

Shooting gallery games can be light gun games and rail-shooters, although many can also be played using a regular joypad and an on-screen cursor to signify where the bullets are being aimed. When these debuted, they were typically played from a first-person perspective, with enemy fire that occurred anywhere on the screen damaging or killing the player. As they evolved away from the use of light guns, the player came to be represented by an on-screen avatar, usually someone on the bottom of the screen, who could move and avoid enemy attacks while returning fire. These sorts of shooters almost always utilize horizontal scrolling to the right to indicate level progression, with enemies appearing in waves from predestined locations in the background or from the sides. One of the earliest examples is the 1985 arcade game Shootout produced by Data East.

As light gun games and rail shooters became more prevalent and started to make use of scrolling backgrounds, such as Operation Wolf, or fully 3D backgrounds, such as the Time Crisis or House of the Dead series, these sorts of games fell out of popular production, but many like Blood Bros. still have their fanbase today. Other notable games of this category include Cabal and Wild Guns.

=== Light gun shooter ===
Light gun shooters are shooters designed for use with a gun-shaped controller, typically a light gun in arcade games; similar control methods include a positional gun, motion controller, pointing device or analog stick. The first light guns appeared in the 1930s, following the development of light-sensing vacuum tubes. It was not long before the technology began appearing in mechanical shooting arcade games, dating back to the Seeburg Ray-O-Lite in 1936. These early mechanical gun games evolved into shooting electro-mechanical games around the mid-20th century, and in turn evolved into light gun shooter video games in the 1970s.

Early mechanical light gun games used small targets (usually moving) onto which a light-sensing tube was mounted; the player used a gun (usually a rifle) that emitted a beam of light when the trigger was pulled. If the beam struck the target, a "hit" was scored. Modern screen-based video game light guns work on the opposite principle—the sensor is built into the gun itself, and the on-screen target(s) emit light rather than the gun. The first light gun of this type was used on the MIT Whirlwind computer, which used a similar light pen. Like rail shooters, movement is typically limited in light-gun games.

Notable games of this category include the 1974 and 1984 versions of Wild Gunman, Duck Hunt for the NES, Operation Wolf, Lethal Enforcers, the Virtua Cop series, Time Crisis series, The House of the Dead series, and Resident Evil: The Umbrella Chronicles & Darkside Chronicles.

=== First-person shooter (FPS) ===
Doom (1993), a PC game which defined the first-person shooter (FPS) subgenre

First-person shooters are characterized by an on-screen representation of the player character's perspective within a three-dimensional space, with the player having control and agency over the character's movement and action within that space. While many rail shooters and light-gun shooters also use a first-person perspective, they are generally not included in this category, as the player generally lacks agency to move their character within the game world.

Notable examples of the genre include Doom, Quake, Counter-Strike, GoldenEye 007, Battlefield, Medal of Honor, Unreal, Call of Duty, Killzone, TimeSplitters, Team Fortress 2 and Halo, while games such as Half-Life, Deus Ex, and System Shock would combine shooter gameplay with narrative-focused or role-playing game elements to instead branch off into the immersive sim genre.

==== Boomer shooter ====
Boomer shooter is a term used to describe newer FPS games (2010s and later) that are purposely designed to emulate the style and design principles of 1990s FPS games like Doom and Quake. The name "boomer shooter" is derived from the baby boomer generation; "boomer" has since become slang for anything old or antiquated. According to New Blood Interactive CEO Dave Oshry, the term originated following the release of Dusk (2018), with fans of that game quickly coining the term. Newer triple-A games like Wolfenstein: The New Order (2014), Doom (2016), and Doom Eternal (2020) helped to repopularize these styles of shooters in the mid-2010s, and indie developers further contributed to the field with games like Amid Evil, Ion Fury, and Ultrakill.

=== Third-person shooter (TPS) ===
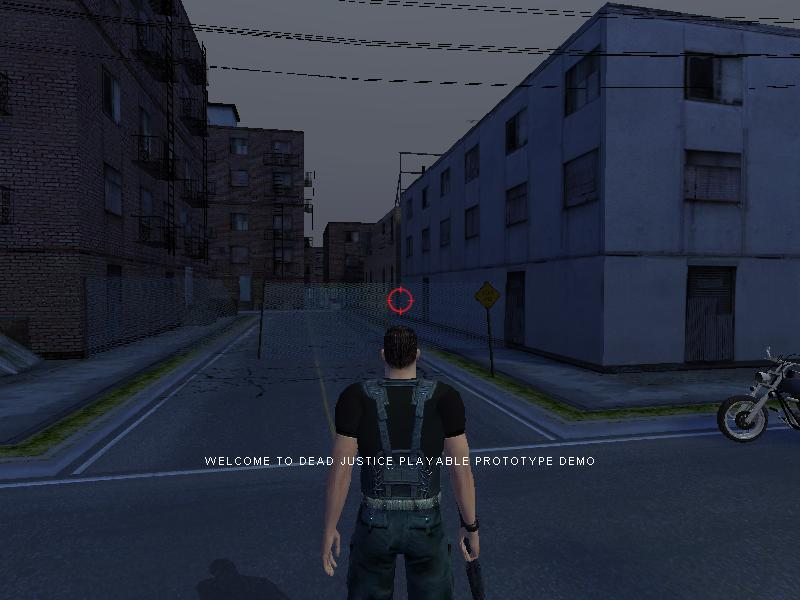
Gameplay view in a third-person shooter game

Third-person shooters are characterized by a third-person camera view that fully displays the player character in their surroundings.

Notable examples of the genre include Fortnite, the Tomb Raider series, several entries in the Resident Evil and Metal Gear Solid franchises, Syphon Filter, Max Payne, SOCOM, Star Wars: Battlefront, Gears of War, and Splatoon. Third person shooter mechanics are often incorporated into open-world adventure and sandbox games, including the Elder Scrolls series and the Grand Theft Auto franchise.

=== FPS/TPS variants ===
==== Arena shooter ====
Arena shooters are multiplayer games that feature fast paced gameplay that emphasize quick speed and agile movement, and played out on levels or maps of limited size (the "arena"). Many of these are presented as first-person shooters, and thus "arena FPS" may also be used to describe a subset of these games. Examples of these include the Quake and Unreal series, more specifically Quake III Arena and Unreal Tournament which first pioneered the genre. Arena shooters can also be played from other perspectives, such as via a top-down view in games like Robotron 2084 and Geometry Wars. Arena shooters frequently emphasize multiplayer modes with few or no single-player modes outside of practice matches with computer-controlled opponents. The genre hit its peak in popularity in the late 90s and early 2000s.

==== Hero shooter ====
Hero shooters are a variation of multiplayer first- or third-person shooters, where players form into two or more teams and select from pre-designed "hero" characters, with each possessing distinctive abilities or weapons that are specific to them. Hero shooters strongly encourage teamwork between players on a team, guiding players to select effective combinations of hero characters and coordinate the use of hero abilities during a match. Outside of a match, players have the ability to customize the appearance of these characters, but these changes are usually cosmetic only and do not alter the game's balance or the behavior of the "hero". Hero shooters take many of their design elements from older class-based shooter, multiplayer online battle arena and fighting games. The class-based shooter Team Fortress 2 is considered to be the codifier of the hero shooter genre. Popular hero shooters include Overwatch, Paladins, Apex Legends, and Valorant. Hero shooters have been considered to have strong potential as esports games as a large degree of skill and coordination arises from the importance of teamwork.

==== Tactical shooter ====
Tactical shooters are shooters that generally simulate realistic squad-based or man-to-man skirmishes. Notable examples of the genre include Ubisoft's Tom Clancy's Rainbow Six and Ghost Recon series and Bohemia Software's Operation Flashpoint. A common feature of tactical shooters that is not present in many other shooters is the ability for the player character to lean out of cover, increasing the granularity of a player's movement and stance options to enhance the realism of the game. Tactical shooters also commonly feature more extensive equipment management, more complex healing systems, and greater depth of simulation compared to other shooters. As a result of this, many tactical shooters are commonly played from the first person perspective. Tactical shooters may combine elements from other shooter genres, such as Rainbow Six Siege, Valorant, and Squad, which combine the traditional tactical shooter style with the class-based gameplay of hero shooters.

A further variant of the tactical shooter is the extraction shooter, generally defined by the gameplay style of Escape from Tarkov. These games are often "player versus player versus environment" (PvPvE), where players are grouped into teams and placed on a map with the goal to reach an extraction point elsewhere on the map while avoiding the opposing team and non-player character enemies. During their attempt to reach the extraction point, the players may try to loot the opposing team or other features on the map for gear, which if they successfully reach the extraction point, they can keep and use to improve their character. Alternatively, they may have other assigned objectives to complete before extraction for better rewards. Gameplay is more slow and tactical for survival rather than straightforward run-and-gun. Other examples of extraction shooters include ARC Raiders, Hunt: Showdown, The Cycle: Frontier and the upcoming revival of the Marathon series.

==== Looter shooter ====
Looter shooters are shooter games where the player's overarching goal is the accumulation of loot: weapons, equipment, armor, accessories and resources. To achieve this players complete tasks framed as quests, missions or campaigns and are rewarded with better weapons, gear and accessories as a result, with the qualities, attributes and perks of such gear generated randomly following certain rarity scales (also known as loot tables). The better gear allows players to take on more difficult missions with potentially more powerful rewards, forming the game's compulsion loop. Loot shooters are inspired by similar loot-based action role-playing games like Diablo. Examples of loot shooters include the Borderlands franchise, Warframe, Destiny and its sequel, and Tom Clancy's The Division and its sequel.

=== Artillery game ===
Artillery games have been described as a type of "shooting game", though they are more frequently classified as a type of strategy game.

=== Battle royale ===
Battle royale games are a subgenre of action games that combine last-man-standing gameplay with survival game elements, and frequently includes shooter elements. It is almost exclusively multiplayer in nature, and eschews the complex crafting and resource gathering mechanics of survival games for a faster-paced confrontation game more typical of shooters. The genre is named after the Japanese film Battle Royale (2000) which itself was based on the 1999 novel of the same name, and was popularized in video games with PUBG Battlegrounds and Fortnite Battle Royale.

== History ==
The concept of shooting games existed before video games, dating back to shooting gallery carnival games in the late 19th century, as well as target sports such as shooting sports, bowling, cue sports, archery and darts. Mechanical gun games first appeared in England's amusement arcades around the turn of the 20th century, before appearing in America by the 1920s. The British cinematic shooting gallery game Life Targets (1912) was a mechanical interactive film game where players shot at a cinema screen displaying film footage of targets. The first light guns appeared in the 1930s, with the Seeburg Ray-O-Lite. Games using this toy rifle were mechanical and the rifle fired beams of light at targets wired with sensors.

Shooting gallery games eventually evolved into more sophisticated shooting electro-mechanical games (EM games) such as Sega's influential Periscope (1965). Contemporary shooting video games have roots in older EM shooting games. Another influential Sega EM shooting game was Gun Fight (1969), where two players control cowboy figurines on opposing sides of a playfield full of obstacles, with each player attempting to shoot the opponent's cowboy. It had a Western theme and was one of the first games to feature competitive head-to-head shooting between two players, inspiring several early Western-themed shooter video games.

=== 1960s to mid-1970s ===
Spacewar! (1962), recognized as one of the first video games, was also the first shooter video game; it featured two players controlling spacecraft trying to fire onto the other player. Spacewar! was the basis for the first arcade video games, Computer Space and Galaxy Game, in 1971. In the 1970s, EM gun games evolved into light gun shooter video games. The first home video game console, the Magnavox Odyssey, shipped with a light gun for a shooting gallery game in 1972. In 1974, Tank by Kee Games adapted the concept of Computer Space into a more grounded tank combat game with simplified physics and maze game elements, becoming a hit in arcades. Spasim and Maze War (1974) were effectively first-person shooter (FPS) games, but had wireframe graphics and lacked the free-roaming character movement of later FPS titles.

In 1975, Taito's Tomohiro Nishikado adapted the concept of Sega's EM game Gun Fight into a video game, Western Gun (1975), with the cowboys represented as character sprites and both players able to maneuver across a landscape while shooting each other, making it a milestone for depicting human shooting targets. Western Gun became an arcade hit, which, along with Tank, popularized a subgenre of one-on-one dueling video games. Midway's North American localization of Western Gun, called Gun Fight, also introduced the use of a microprocessor. In 1976, Midway had another hit shooting video game, Sea Wolf (1976), which was adapted from another Sega EM game, Periscope.

=== Late 1970s to 1980s ===
The genre gained major attraction in popular culture with the release of Taito's Space Invaders arcade video game in 1978. It established the basis of the shoot 'em up subgenre, and became a cultural phenomenon that led into a golden age of arcade video games that lasted until around 1983. In contrast to earlier shooting games, Space Invaders has targets that fire back at the player, who in turn has multiple lives. Designed by Tomohiro Nishikado, who combined elements from his earlier Western Gun (such as destructible environmental objects) with elements of Atari's Breakout (1976) and science fiction media, Space Invaders established a formula of "shoot or be shot" against numerous enemies. Space shooters subsequently became the dominant genre in arcades from the late 1970s up until the early 1980s. Most of these shooting games were presented from a 2D top-down-style perspective, with either a fixed or scrolling field. Games like Space Wars (1977) by Cinematronics and Tempest (1981) by Atari used vector graphics displays rather than raster graphics, while Sega's Zaxxon (1981) was the first video game to use an isometric playfield.

In the early 1980s, Japanese arcade developers began moving away from space shooters towards character action games. On the other hand, American arcade developers continued to focus on space shooters during the early 1980s. According to Eugene Jarvis, American arcade developers were greatly influenced by Japanese space shooters but took the genre in a different direction from the "more deterministic, scripted, pattern-type" gameplay of Japanese games, towards a more "programmer-centric design culture, emphasizing algorithmic generation of backgrounds and enemy dispatch" and "an emphasis on random-event generation, particle-effect explosions and physics" as seen in arcade games such as his own Defender (1981) and Robotron: 2084 (1982) as well as Atari's Asteroids (1979). Nevertheless, Japanese developers occasionally released defining space shooters in the early 1980s, such as Sega's isometric shooter Zaxxon and pseudo-3D rail shooter Buck Rogers: Planet of Zoom (1982) demonstrating the potential of 3D shoot 'em up gameplay.

Shooter games diversified by the mid-1980s, with first-person light gun shooting gallery games such as Nintendo's Duck Hunt (1984), pseudo-3D third-person rail shooters such as Sega's Space Harrier (1985) and After Burner (1987), and military-themed scrolling run and gun video games such as Capcom's Commando (1985), Konami's Green Beret (1985) and SNK's Ikari Warriors (1986). In the late 1980s, Taito's Operation Wolf (1987) popularized military-themed first-person light gun rail shooters.

=== 1990s to present ===
Doom (1993) by id Software is considered the first major popular first-person shooter (FPS), and it was a major leap forward for three-dimensional environments in shooter games as well as action games in general. While first-person perspectives had been used by rail shooter and shooting gallery games, they lacked player-guided navigation through a three-dimensional space, a defining feature of FPS games.

The use of texture-mapped 3D polygon graphics in shooter games dates back to Sega AM2's light gun rail shooter Virtua Cop (1994), followed by Sega's mech simulation shooter Metal Head (1995) and Parallax Software's FPS game Descent (1995). GoldenEye 007 (1997) for the Nintendo 64 later combined the FPS sub-genre with light gun rail shooter elements from Virtua Cop, popularizing FPS games on consoles. In the late 1990s, FPS games became increasingly popular while rail shooters declined in popularity, as FPS games were generally able to offer more variety, depth and sophistication than rail shooters. One of the last mainstream light gun rail shooter franchises was The House of the Dead horror game series in the late 1990s, which along with Resident Evil had a significant cultural impact on zombie media including zombie films by the 2000s.

== Controversy ==
Due to its violent nature, some consider the shooter game genre to be a representation of real world violence. Debates regarding video games causing violence were exacerbated by the 1999 Columbine High School massacre, whose perpetrators, Eric Harris and Dylan Klebold, were fans of the game Doom. Similarly, in Germany, school shootings such as those at Erfurt, Emsdetten and Winnenden, resulted in conservative politicians accusing violent shooter games, most notably Counter Strike, of inciting young gamers to run amok. Several attempts were made to ban the "Killerspiele" (killing games) in Germany and the European Union. Shooter games were further criticized when Anders Behring Breivik, perpetrator of the 2011 Norway attacks, claimed that he developed target acquisition skills by playing Call of Duty: Modern Warfare 2. This has led to a plethora of experimental research to determine the true effects. Experimental Research, focusing on the short term effects, found that playing violent games can increase the player's aggression. In a 2011 Supreme Court case involving a California law, Justice Antonio Scalia stated that there was some correlation between violent video games and increased aggression, but very little real-world effects. An experiment by C.A. Anderson and K.E. Dill, in which they had undergraduates randomly play either a violent or non-violent game, determined that the students who played the violent game were more susceptible to primed aggressive thoughts. Further studies have shown that there are some limitations with the research. Many research studies have not taken into account that violent video games tend to be more competitive, have a higher playing difficulty, and are more fast paced than non-violent games. Past research also shows that the way aggression was measured in the studies could be compared to the way competitiveness is measured, leaving open the question of whether or not the effects of violent video games are forms of aggression or competitiveness.

== See also ==
- Combat flight simulation games, many of which contain shooter game elements
- Shoot 'em up
