= Scourge (disambiguation) =

A scourge is a whip or flail.

Scourge may also refer to:

- Scourge (Magic: The Gathering), an expansion set to Magic: The Gathering
- USS Scourge (1812), an American schooner converted to a warship; sank during the War of 1812
- "The Scourge" (Stargate SG-1), an episode of Stargate SG-1
- Scourge (Transformers), one of four fictional characters in the Transformers series
- Scourge of the Underworld a villain in Marvel Comics
- Scourge, a trade name for a product that contains resmethrin
- Scourge, an era in the fictional world of Earthdawn
- Scourge, a cat character in the Warriors novel series
- The Scourge, a fictional group introduced in "Hero", an episode of Angel
- Scourge, a 2007 play by Marc Bamuthi Joseph
- Scourge: Outbreak, third-person shooter video game.
- The Scourge (film), a 1922 British silent film
- The Scourge (video game)
- Scourge (album)

== See also ==
- Scourge of God, several different figures and concepts
- Scourge of the Underworld, an identity used by several vigilantes in the Marvel Comics universe
- Cluny the Scourge, the main antagonist in Redwall by Brian Jacques
- Scourge the Hedgehog in the Sonic the Hedgehog comic books
- The Undead Scourge, a faction in the Warcraft series
- "Scourge of the Seven Skies", Episode Seven of 2017 Nickelodeon show Mysticons
