= Scourge (comics) =

Scourge, in comics, may refer to:

- Scourge of the Underworld, an organization responsible for the deaths of numerous supervillains
  - Jack Monroe, a character temporarily brainwashed into being an agent of the organization, using the name, Scourge
- Scourge, a member of the Thunderbolts during Dark Reign, who is revealed to be Nuke (Marvel Comics)

== See also ==
- Skurge, the Executioner, an Asgardian supervillain
- Scourge (disambiguation)
