= Minon: Everyday Hero =

2007 video game

- European cover art
- Developer: Red Entertainment
- Publishers: JP: Success; PAL: Nordcurrent; NA: UFO Interactive Games
- Platform: Wii
- Release: JP: June 21, 2007; PAL: May 15, 2009; NA: August 18, 2009
- Genre: Action
- Modes: Single-player, multiplayer

Minon: Everyday Hero, known in Japan as Go! Go! Minon (GO! GO! ミノン) and in North America as Domino Rally, is a video game developed by Red Entertainment for Nintendo's Wii console. Its gameplay is similar to the 1998 game No One Can Stop Mr. Domino!.

The game was first listed by Mastiff at the 2006 Electronic Entertainment Expo under the title Mr. D Goes to Town. It was later shown developer Red Entertainment and publisher Success at a Nintendo Wii press event in Tokyo during September 2006. Titled Machi Kuru Domino, they planned to release it as a launch game for the console.

== Reception ==
Reception

Aggregate score
| Aggregator | Score |
|---|---|
| Metacritic | 57/100 |

Review score
| Publication | Score |
|---|---|
| Nintendo Life | 6/10 |

Minon: Everyday Hero received mixed reviews from critics. On Metacritic, the game has a score of 57/100 based on 4 reviews, indicating "mixed or average reviews".

Sean Aaron of Nintendo Life gave the game 6 stars out of 10, praising the controls and soundtrack but criticizing the low amount of content it had to offer, resulting in the game lacking longevity.
