= Monster Racers =

2009 video game

- North American cover art
- Developer: Koei
- Publishers: JP: Koei; NA: UFO Interactive Games
- Director: Osamu Mieda
- Programmer: Masafumi Takano
- Composer: Haruki Yamada
- Platform: Nintendo DS
- Release: JP: January 22, 2009; NA: May 11, 2010
- Genres: Role-playing, racing
- Modes: Single-player, multiplayer

Monster Racers (Note: Known in Japan as Monster☆Racer (Japanese: モンスター☆レーサー, Hepburn: Monsutā☆Rēsā)) is a monster-taming and racing game hybrid developed and published by Koei, and published by UFO Interactive Games in North America. It was released on January 22, 2009 in Japan, with a KOEI The Best re-release on December 10, 2009, and on May 11, 2010 in North America, for Nintendo DS. The game, set in a Pokémon-esque modern fantasy world, allows players to catch monsters and use them to compete in races. It is a spiritual sequel to the unrelated Monstar Race (Note: Known in Japan as Monstar☆Race (Japanese: もんすたあ☆レース, Hepburn: Mon suta a☆Rēsu)) series, originally released in 1998 on Game Boy. It received mixed reception from critics, who praised its gameplay and graphics, but decried its lack of originality and weak story.

== Plot ==
Ten years ago, a small island in the Pacific Ocean was discovered to have monsters described as strange fantastical, who also were characterized as having a competitive spirit to race against each other. Since then, those monsters proliferated outside the island, with people around the world competing against one another by utilizing said monsters, giving rise to Monster Races as a worldwide competitive sport. The player, new to this sport, makes the trip to Star Island to fulfill their lifelong dream to become the top racer in the world. After picking out their first monster, they take a test to obtain a license to compete in annual monster racing tournaments held on each of the seven continents of the world. Along the way, however, an evil group is out there to hinder the player's adventure.

== Gameplay ==
The game plays in the manner of a top-down JRPG, in which the player can explore towns and talk to NPCs to obtain quests. In the wilds, the player finds other characters to fight, and also directly controls their chosen monster in races against wild monsters to defeat or befriend them. Races have a combat element, and attacking enemies from behind or above slows them down. Players must blast opposing wild monsters with energy before the race is finished in order to capture them. Short 2D platforming races level up the player's monster, while races against other trainers are longer and give more experience points. Tournament matches have four tiers of qualifiers and four monsters racing at once.

== Development ==
Monster Racers was first announced at Tokyo Game Show 2008, and was unveiled in Europe at MCM Expo 2008 and North America at E3 2009, presented by Koei trade show models and featuring a promotional costume of Furion, (Note: Known in Japan as Flare (Japanese: フレア, Hepburn: Furea)) one of the game's legendary monsters. Prior to the game's release, Koei Tecmo announced it was being published by UFO Interactive in North America as part of a partnership with the company, alongside Monster Rancher DS.

== Reception ==
Reception

Aggregate score
| Aggregator | Score |
|---|---|
| Metacritic | 70/100 |

Review scores
| Publication | Score |
|---|---|
| GameSpot | 7.5/10 |
| GamesRadar+ | 3/5 |
| RPGamer | 3/5 |

Monster Racers received an aggregate score of 70/100 on Metacritic, indicating "mixed or average" reviews.

In pre-release E3 impressions, Rus McLaughlin of IGN described the game's races as "mildly fun", but "tough to see [...] being diverting for long", saying the game's real appeal would be in the collecting and breeding of monsters. He noted that the game seemed to directly copy the Pokémon formula.

Following the game's release, Nathan Meunier of GameSpot rated it 7.5/10 points, describing it as addictive but unoriginal. Describing its "blatant" riffing off the Pokémon franchise, he nevertheless described the races as enjoyable, with "a lot of variety and subtle depth". He called the game's campaign "a colorful and exuberant affair", saying that there was a lot to explore, and praising the local multiplayer matches. He described the game as having "fun [...] hiding beneath the surface" despite its derivative aspects leaving a "bad aftertaste".

Jason Schreier of GamesRadar+ rated the game 3/5 stars, calling it repetitive and hard to play for more than short bursts. He described the races as monotonous, and said that there were "inexcusable graphical hang-ups". While saying it had potential to be a great game, he noted that there was too little variety. Zach Welhouse of RPGamer similarly rated the game 3/5 points, describing its monster designs as "clever" but the overall graphics as "generic". Calling the game's dialog more spirited than Pokémon, he nevertheless said that the game never escaped "mediocrity".
