= Balloon Pop =

- Developers: Dreams Co., Ltd.
- Publishers: NA: UFO Interactive Games; EU: 505 Games; JP: Interchannel
- Platforms: Wii, WiiWare, Nintendo DS
- Release: Wii: NA: October 23, 2007; EU: February 29, 2008; JP: September 4, 2008; Nintendo DS: NA: October 23, 2009; WiiWare: NA: July 12, 2010
- Genre: Puzzle
- Modes: Single-player, multiplayer

Balloon Pop, known in Europe as Pop! and in Japan as Rainbow Pop (レインボーポップ), is a video game developed by Japanese studio Dreams and released for the Wii in North America on October 23, 2007. It is the first puzzle strategy game released for the Wii. The objective of the game is to pop balloons using the Wii Remote. There are various modes including Story Mode, Puzzle Mode, and VS CPU mode. Balloon Pop can support up to two players. The Nintendo DS version of the game was released on October 23, 2009.

A WiiWare version entitled Balloon Pop Festival, was released in North America on July 12, 2010.

Two more sequels for the Nintendo 3DS named Balloon Pop Remix and Balloon Pop 2 were released in 2012 and 2013 respectively on the Nintendo eShop

== Story ==
=== Balloon Pop (2007) ===
The protagonist, a yellow and orange capped anthropomorphic mushroom, resides on a planet not unlike Earth. The life on this earth is peaceful, and the four seasons keep the earth inhabitable with life. One day, the infamous villain known as the Balloon Bandit attacks the earth, sealing the seasons away in magical balloons. Time eventually stops and the earth had become a lifeless, deserted wasteland. The mushroom realizes that if enough balloons are popped throughout the months, the seasons will return and they will revive the earth. The mushroom cannot do this alone, however, and has the destiny of the earth in the player's hands.

(Note that the DS port has no story and is instead a standard puzzle game)

=== Balloon Pop Festival ===
The plot is similar to Balloon Pop (2007), except that the holidays in each month had been sealed by the Balloon Bandit, rather than seasons. The same mushroom from the original game returns as the protagonist.

== Gameplay ==
=== Endless/Story/1P ===
The objective is to link at least 3 balloons in a row using the Wii Remote (Original game, Festival) or the stylus (DS, Remix, 2). The player can either point the Wii Remote at the balloon, hold A, then flick the remote in the desired direction, or hold the remote sideways for a conventional control style. The DS version is more simple, as the player can quickly move balloons by holding the stylus on the balloon and sliding in the desired direction. If the colors of the balloons match, a 3–5-second countdown will start (depending on the amount of combos made), allowing the player to combine any adjacent balloons of the same color or make additional combinations of other colors, if possible. If the timer runs out, or the player presses the B button, the balloons will pop. There is an overflow line at the bottom of the screen that will end the game should too many balloons build up or the grid of balloons scroll past the line. In the 2007 version and Festival, the player starts at January and must get through all 12 months, ending at December, without getting a Game Over. Once the player reaches Level 100 or higher; overflowing the screen at this point will begin a credit sequence, showing a restored Earth. A credits minigame will begin where the player can shoot down balloons, UFOs, and the Balloon Bandit/King in the end for a score boost) In the DS version, the game continues endlessly regardless of level and will only end once the line is breached or if the player manually quits, though a high score will only be saved if the former occurs on DS; the latter simply shows the Game Over screen and returns to the title screen.

=== Puzzle ===
The player has a limited amount of moves, usually only one or two. The objective is to pop every single balloon in the amount of moves by moving a balloon and creating a domino effect. If too many moves are made or not every balloon is popped after the set amount of moves, the game will end, prompting the player to retry or return to the main menu. If all the balloons are popped, the player may move on to the next level. The music played in each level cycles through the five soundtracks in Story Mode in order, but the DS version only plays the December theme due to technical limitations, Due to the swift controls on the DS version compared to the clunky Wii controls, the level difficulty sharply increases upon reaching Level 2.

=== VS CPU ===
The player competes against a robotic mushroom, representing a CPU player, on the right side of the screen. The gameplay is similar to the 1P mode, except the objective here is to survive the CPU player. Weights will appear in addition to balloons, which will pull down the player's balloons to the limit faster, increasing difficulty. To remove the weights, the balloons on the row or column that the weight is attached to must be popped. If the CPU loses, the player will win and advance to the next round. If the CPU wins, the player loses and will be prompted to retry, like in Puzzle Mode.

=== VS 2P ===
Same as VS CPU, except that an actual second player controls the right side. The mushroom representing the 2nd player is a blue capped mushroom. In the DS version, despite there being only a VS CPU mode, the CPU is also a blue mushroom.

== Balloon Pop Remix ==
Unlike the other games in the series which were inspired by EA's Bejeweled and/or Sega's Puyo Puyo, Remix was simply a direct clone of Bejeweled with Balloon Pop elements. The mushroom from the previous games was canned in place for a weird jellybean-shaped alien, who crash landed on Earth and needs help returning home. The objective is to keep the mana meter full by popping balloons. If the mana meter runs out, the game is over.

== Reception ==
=== Balloon Pop (Wii) ===
IGN gave Balloon Pop on Wii an overall rating of 4.7 out of 10 ("bad"), calling it "a puzzle game that rips off many previous titles but forgot to borrow some challenge."

In a 3 out 5 star review, GamesRadar+ concluded "until the Wii's software library offers better options for the price, it's a decent choice for genre dabblers and those seeking a simple diversion."

=== Balloon Pop Festival ===
IGN gave Balloon Pop Festival an overall rating of 7 out of 10 ("good"), noting the release is "another straightforward match-three puzzler in the tradition of titles like Bejeweled and Tetris Attack," but cites it "isn't too friendly toward colorblind or color-deficient players"

NintendoLife also gave a 7 out of 10 rating, and concludes with "there might not be another WiiWare game with such a great mixture of cute, colourful visuals and engaging gameplay fundamentals."

=== Balloon Pop Remix ===
Both NintendoLife and NintendoWorldReport gave Balloon Pop Remix a 7 out of 10 rating, with the former noting it "does a decidedly lackluster job at keeping high-scores."
