= Sudoku Mania =

2006 puzzle video game

- Developer: Frontline Studios
- Publisher: UFO Interactive Games
- Platform: Nintendo DS
- Release: NA: June 30, 2006
- Genre: Puzzle
- Modes: Single-player, multiplayer

Sudoku Mania is a 2006 sudoku puzzle game developed by Frontline Studios and published by UFO Interactive Games. Released on June 30, 2006, Sudoku Mania received "generally unfavorable" reviews from critics, having a score of 25 out of 100 on review aggregator Metacritic. Critics criticized the game's controls for being "disappointingly" "simplistic" and "obtuse".

== Gameplay ==
A typical unsolved sudoku puzzle.

Sudoku Mania's gameplay is identical to that of the number-placement puzzle sudoku; players have to fill a 9×9 grid with numbers; however, no line or 3×3 box can feature multiple of the same number. The game is primarily controlled using the Nintendo DS' d-pad. The game's puzzles are randomly-generated and are divided into 4 different difficulty levels: simple, easy, medium, and hard. The game allows players to write down notes and possible solutions and has an optional "auto-solve" feature, which will automatically solve a puzzle. Two other modes are also included in the game: one where the player fills the grid with symbols, rather than numbers, and a local multiplayer mode, where two players take turns filling the grid, with the player who entered the most correct numbers winning.

== Development and release ==
Sudoku Mania was developed by the Frontline Studios, located in Poland and the United States. The California-based UFO Interactive Games published the game.

Sudoku Mania was originally intended to release on June 23, 2006, in North America; however, it was delayed to June 30.

== Reception ==
Reception

Aggregate score
Aggregator	Score
Metacritic	25/100 (Note: Based on 4 reviews.)

Review scores
Publication	Score
AllGame	2/5
GameZone	3.4/10
IGN	3/10

Sudoku Mania received "generally unfavorable" reviews, according to review aggregator Metacritic. On the aggregator, the game has a score of 25/100, based on 4 reviews. Critics criticized the game's controls; GameZone stated that the controls were "obtuse" and "counteractive" to the game's marketing, which advertised that the game had an "easy-to-use" touchscreen control scheme; IGN called the game's user interface "simplistic" and, when in comparison with other sudoku games on the Nintendo DS, "disappointing".

Chris Oder, in a review for GameZone, called Sudoku Mania a "fad cash-in", stating that there are better alternatives to the game on the Nintendo DS, even if players are fans of sudoku. Oder rated the game's gameplay 3.5/10, stating that Sudoku Mania was one of the few times where a developer had messed-up a sudoku video game. Oder criticized the graphics due to the game's background and called the game's soundtrack "awful", and suggested that players should play Sudoku Mania with volume turned off. Oder was more positive towards the game's concept, rating it 6.1/10; Oder praised the game's randomly-generating puzzles for being unique.

Craig Harris of IGN stated that, even if it was the only sudoku game on the Nintendo DS, it'd be hard to recommend Sudoku Mania, stating that players should "stock-up" on paperback versions of sudoku, rather than playing Sudoku Mania. Harris called the game even worse when in comparison with other sudoku games on the Nintendo DS. Alike Oder, Harris was positive towards the game's concept of having randomly-generated puzzles, but criticized its execution, calling it "rudimentary" and noting how some puzzles could be solved in a "snap" due to their easiness.

Gracie Leach of AllGame noted how Sudoku Mania has similarities with Hudson Soft's Sudoku Gridmaster, another sudoku puzzle game on the Nintendo DS.
