= Tengai Makyō: Daiyon no Mokushiroku =

1997 video game

- Sega Saturn cover art
- Developers: Hudson Soft; Red Company
- Publisher: Hudson Soft
- Director: Takashi Takebe
- Producer: Tomoya Abe
- Artists: Torajiro Tsujino (Yoshiteru Tsujino)
- Writer: Yutaka Nagayama
- Composer: Toshiyuki Sasagawa
- Series: Tengai Makyō
- Platforms: Sega Saturn, PlayStation Portable
- Release: Sega Saturn: JP: January 14, 1997; PlayStation Portable: JP: July 13, 2006
- Genre: Role-playing
- Modes: Single-player, multiplayer (Saturn)

Tengai Makyō: Daiyon no Mokushiroku (天外魔境 第四の黙示録, Tengai Makyō: Daiyon no Mokushiroku), also known as Tengai Makyō: The Apocalypse IV, is a 1997 role-playing video game developed and published by Hudson Soft and Red Company for the Sega Saturn. The game was released in Japan on January 14, 1997. It was ported to the PlayStation Portable on July 13, 2006 and re-released for the "Hudson the Best" line-up on July 31, 2008.

Tengai Makyō: Daiyon no Mokushiroku is the eighth game in the Tengai Makyō series. Unlike previous installments in the series, which take place in a fictional version of Japan named "Jipang", the game takes place in a fictionalized and anachronized version of 1890s America.

== Characters ==
=== Main characters ===
Raijin (雷神, Raijin)
Voiced by: Tomokazu Seki
The 16-year-old male protagonist of the story. Raised by the legendary monster-hunter Red Bear from an early age, he is often entirely straightfaced in face of all of the insanity that occurs around him. He bears the mark of the "Flame Hero" on his left shoulder. The kanji of his name means "thunder god".
Yumemi (夢見, Yumemi)
Voiced by: Tomo Sakurai
The 12-year-old female protagonist of the story. She is a childhood friend of Raijin with a dark terrible fate involving her twin brother, Sam.
Zengō Shōgetsuin (小月院禅剛, Shōgetsuin Zengō)
Voiced by: Toshihiko Nakajima
A 35-year-old Jipang man who lives in America as a butcher, often daydreams of becoming a samurai. As a matter of fact, he left his wife and 2 children just to lead a wandering life of a samurai.
Yūnō (夕能, Yūnō)
Voiced by: Hiroko Kasahara
A 17-year-old Indian warrior from Seattle. She bears the mark of the "Flame Hero" on her right breast, which she initially fears to be a sign of the devil.
Ace (エース, Ēsu)
Voiced by: Kappei Yamaguchi
A direct descendant of Kabuki Danjuro living in America, his real name being Cherry Abes. despite being a descendant of a "Flame Hero", he has a very timid personality and shown to be very clumsy, but in times of need, he dons his mask as a "legendary sheriff who fights with the power of a hundred men" - Ace. He is also well versed with machinery.

=== Supporting characters ===
Red Bear (レッド・ベア, Reddo Bea)
Voiced by: Shūichirō Moriyama
A legendary monster-hunter in America, who raised Raijin when he was a baby, he was ultimately killed in Alaska when he tried to slay Blizzard.
Seiya (星夜, Seiya)
Voiced by: Megumi Ogata
A black-clothed man who meets Raijin in Alaska.
Bob (ボブ, Bobu)
Voiced by: Nyūdō Nishimura
A Jamaican bobsleigh coach cursed with a power of a demon from a long time ago, he makes up for it by teaching local kids how to bobsleigh in the deserts of Mexico.
Kamon (火門, Kamon)
Voiced by: Kōichi Yamadera
A cyborg found and activated by Ace, who gives his live up to save the party later in the game.
NPC
Voiced by: Chisa Yokoyama
A NPC which can be named by the player in a scenario where the player must solve a puzzle in a picture book.
Sam (サム, Samu)
Voiced by: Ai Orikasa
Yumemi's older twin brother, who was unfortunately bewitched by Sanetomo when he woke him up from his slumber 6 years ago.

=== The Twelve Apostles ===
"Pure Silver" Blizzard (純銀のブリザード, Jungin no Burizādo)
Voiced by: Shin-ichiro Miki
A member of the Twelve Apostles who governs Alaska. He dresses like a punk rocker and uses ice-based attacks.
"Darkness Lover" Candy (闇の恋人キャンディ, Yami no Koibito Kyandi)
Voiced by: Yukana
A member of the Twelve Apostles who governs Montana. She is a cabaret star who attempts to seduce the youth of Seattle with her music.
"Thousand Faces" Ron Terry (千の顔のロン・テリー, Sen no Kao no Ron Terī)
Voiced by: Kazuki Yao
A member of the Twelve Apostles who governs California in the guise of a famous director, in order to kidnap children by 'sucking them' into his movies, also made Manto USA famous.
Madame Appetit (マダム・アペティ, Madamu Apeti)
Voiced by: Machiko Soga
A member of the Twelve Apostles who governs Arizona. She is a morbidly obese, middle-aged woman with pig-like features. Her name was a pun on the term "bon appetit".
"Fresh Blood" Belladonna (鮮血のベラドンナ, Senketsu no Beradonna)
Voiced by: Naoko Matsui
A member of the Twelve Apostles who governs Mexico, turns children into zombies by digging out their hearts.
"Crazy Music" Skullbeat (狂楽のスカルビート, Kyōraku no Sukarubīto)
Voiced by: Kōichi Yamadera
A member of the Twelve Apostles who governs Texas.
Doctor M (Dr.M, Dokutā Emu)
Voiced by: Taichirō Hirokawa
A member of the Twelve Apostles who governs Minnesota.
TV Man (TVマン, Tībī Man)
Voiced by: Chie Kōjiro
A member of the Twelve Apostles who governs Florida. He has a small man's body and a television for a head.
"Labyrinth" Delacroix (迷宮のドラクロア, Meikyū no Dorakuroa)
Voiced by: Kikuko Inoue
A member of the Twelve Apostles who governs Louisiana.
The Great Calve (偉大なるカルベ, Idainaru Karube)
Voiced by: Daisuke Gōri
A member of the Twelve Apostles who governs Michigan.
"Beast God" Logos (獣神ロゴス, Jūshin Rogosu)
Voiced by: Hiroshi Ishida
A member of the Twelve Apostles who governs New York, fought twice throughout the entire course of the game.
Sanetomo (サネトモ, Sanetomo)
Voiced by: Leo Morimoto
The leader of the Twelve Apostles. He adopts a polite tone of speech when talking to either friend or foe, the one responsible for brainwashing Sam. His ultimate goal was to recreate the Great flood.
The Absolute God (絶対神, Zettaishin)
Voiced by: Masashi Hirose
The final boss which had taken both Sam and Yumemi as its core.

=== Recurring characters ===
Mr. Ashimoto (Mr.アシモト, Misutā Ashimoto)
Voiced by: Kazuki Yao
A homosexual man who often shows up in different parts of USA as a star scout for Hollywood. Like his ancestors, the Ashimoto brothers, he is a corrupted merchant as well, even though he was not doing any sort of business whatsoever.
Manto USA (マントーUSA, Mantō Yū-esu-ē)
Voiced by: Shigeru Chiba
A loudmouthed baboon who is a supposed Hollywood star who took control of Lake Tahoe, calling himself king and setting monkeys loose everywhere on the street, fought as a gag boss.

== Songs ==
"Bōken no Kaze Dake" (冒険の数だけ)
Lyrics: Toyo Nagayama, Music: Toshiyuki Sasagawa, Arrangement: Takayuki Negishi
Vocals: Tomo Sakurai
"Futari no Happy End" (二人のHAPPY END)
Lyrics: Ōji Hiroi and Toyo Nagayama, Music: Toshiyuki Sasagawa, Arrangement: Akifumi Tada
Vocals: Tomo Sakurai
"We Want Candy" (We Want Candy)
Lyrics: Toyo Nagayama, Music: Toshiyuki Sasagawa, Arrangement: Masami Kishimura
Vocals: Yukana
"Ankoku Dayo! Okkasan" (暗黒だよ！ おっかさん)
Lyrics: Toyo Nagayama, Music: Toshiyuki Sasagawa, Arrangement: Shinji Miyazaki
Vocals: Chie Kōjiro
"TV Hanan Demo Shitteiru" (TVはなんでも知っている)
Lyrics: Toyo Nagayama, Music: Toshiyuki Sasagawa, Arrangement: Shinji Miyazaki
Vocals: Chie Kōjiro
"G Robo Get Glory" (Gロボ GET GLORY)
Lyrics: Toyo Nagayama, Music: Toshiyuki Sasagawa, Arrangement: Takayuki Negishi
Vocals: Hironobu Kageyama
"Debu Raisan" (デブ礼賛)
Lyrics: Toyo Nagayama, Music: Toshiyuki Sasagawa, Arrangement: Akifumi Tada
Vocals: Machiko Soga

== Reception ==
Consoles + gave the game a rating of 96% and praised the audiovisual presentation. RPGFan gave a rating of 95% and said it is "[...] one of those rare games that combines style AND substance".
