= UFO Interactive Games =

Publisher of interactive video game content

UFO Interactive Games, Inc.
- Type: Subsidiary
- Industry: Video games
- Founded: 1999; 27 years ago
- Headquarters: City of Industry, California, U.S.
- Parent: Tommo
- Website: www.ufointeractivegames.com

UFO Interactive Games, based in City of Industry, California, is an American publisher of interactive video game content, developing on multiple platforms with a focus on original and mass-market gaming software. As an official third party licensee of Nintendo of America and Sony Computer Entertainment of America, UFO Interactive Games has published numerous titles for the PlayStation 3, Xbox 360, Nintendo DS, Wii, PlayStation 2 and PlayStation Portable consoles.

The company has published titles which are designed to appeal to hardcore gamers and the general public, such as Raiden IV and Balloon Pop, and has also launched a line of titles tailored for more casual gamers, children and families.

UFO Interactive Games also has long-standing relationships and affiliates with other developers in Asia and Europe.

== Games Published by UFO Interactive Games ==
- Super NES and Nintendo 64
  - Super Bowling
- Sega Dreamcast
  - Industrial Spy: Operation Espionage
  - Seventh Cross: Evolution
- PlayStation 3
  - Raiden IV: OverKill - PSN Digital
  - Mamorukun Curse!
  - Heavenly Guardian - PSN PS2 Classics
  - GunShip - PSN PS1 Classics
- Xbox 360
  - Raiden IV
  - Way of the Samurai 3
  - Rock of the Dead
  - Scourge: Outbreak - XBLA
- PlayStation 2
  - Heavenly Guardian
  - Raiden III
- PlayStation Portable
  - Chameleon: To Dye For!
  - Dungeon Maker II: The Hidden War
  - Warriors of The Lost Empire
  - Elminage Original - PSN Digital
- Nintendo 3DS
  - Samurai Sword Destiny (eShop)
  - Balloon Pop 2
  - Zombie Slayer Diox
  - Johnny Kung Fu
  - Johnny Hotshot
  - Johnny Impossible
- Nintendo DS
  - Chameleon: To Dye For!
  - Chuck E. Cheese's Alien Defense Force
  - Chuck E. Cheese's Arcade Room
  - Chuck E. Cheese's Gameroom
  - Chuck E. Cheese's Party Games
  - Chuck E. Cheese's Playhouse
  - Devilish: Ball Bounder
  - Florist Shop
  - Heavy Armor Brigade
  - Interactive Storybook DS: Series 1
  - Interactive Storybook DS: Series 2
  - Interactive Storybook DS: Series 3
  - Kurupoto Cool Cool Stars
  - Monster Rancher DS
  - Monster Racers
  - Labyrinth
  - OMG 26 -- Our Mini Games
  - Professional Fisherman's Tour: Northern Hemisphere
  - Rain Drops
  - Reversal Challenge
  - Rock Blast
  - Smart Boy's Gameroom
  - Smart Boy's Toy Club
  - Smart Boy's Winter Wonderland
  - Smart Girl's Party Game
  - Smart Girl's Playhouse
  - Smart Girl's Playhouse 2
  - Smart Girl's Winter Wonderland
  - Smart Girl's Magical Book Club
  - Smart Kid's Party Fun Pack
  - Smart Kids Gameclub
  - Sudoku Mania
  - Underground Pool
  - Underwater Attack
- Nintendo Wii
  - Anubis II
  - Army Rescue
  - Balloon Pop
  - Chuck E. Cheese's Party Games
  - Chuck E. Cheese's Sports Games
  - Chuck E. Cheese's Super Collection
  - Domino Rally
  - GEON
  - Heavenly Guardian
  - Rock Blast
  - Saint
  - Spy Games: Elevator Mission
  - The Monkey King: The Legend Begins
  - Ultimate Shooting Collection
- Microsoft Windows
  - Fast Beat Loop Racer GT
- PlayStation 4
  - Bubsy: The Woolies Strike Back
  - Raiden V: Director's Cut
- Nintendo Switch
  - Freddi Fish 3: The Case of the Stolen Conch Shell
  - Putt-Putt Travels Through Time
  - Pajama Sam 2: Thunder and Lightning Aren't so Frightening
  - Pajama Sam: No Need to Hide When It's Dark Outside
  - Putt-Putt Saves the Zoo
  - Spy Fox in "Dry Cereal"
  - Freddi Fish 4: The Case of the Hogfish Rustlers of Briny Gulch
  - Pajama Sam 3: You Are What You Eat from Your Head to Your Feet
  - Freddi Fish and the Case of the Missing Kelp Seeds
  - Freddi Fish 2: The Case of the Haunted Schoolhouse
  - Freddi Fish 5: The Case of the Creature of Coral Cove

== Awards ==
- iParenting Media Award 2007
- The National Parenting Center Seal of Approval Fall 2007
- The National Parenting Center Seal of Approval Holiday 2007
- Children's Technology Review Editor's Choice Award 2007
- The National Parenting Center Seal of Approval 2008
