= Fast Beat Loop Racer =

2011 video game

- Developer: Saint-Fun International
- Publisher: UFO Interactive (Microsoft Windows)
- Platforms: Arcade game, Microsoft Windows
- Release: Arcade: WW: 2011; Microsoft Windows: WW: May 17, 2018
- Genre: Racing game
- Modes: Single-player, Multiplayer

Fast Beat Loop Racer (Chinese: 環狀賽車) is an arcade racing game released by Saint-Fun International in 2011. The cabinets of the game provide an H-pattern gear stick. Players can save their progress and records by using IC cards.

This game was released for Microsoft Windows on May 17, 2018 as Fast Beat Loop Racer GT under publisher UFO Interactive.

== Plot ==
Ryo Sawada, the main protagonist of the series began racing after his graduation. Ryo lives with his father, Takashi Sawada, since Ryo's parents were divorced when he was young. Ryo bought a MND-Ntr (Nissan Silvia S15) to start his racing career, alongside Chang and his Levia (Subaru Impreza WRX STI GRB), also with a new love interest, Yuu and her F/Drake (Mazda RX-7 FD3S).

As Ryo races, he encounters Kamisaka, known as the Silver Dragon, Fei Long known as the Wyvern, and other characters such as Daimon, Rio, Bogarde, Itsuki, Urasawa, Cheimin, Tiger etc.

When Ryo grew up in excitement in racing, he began to run out of cash, so he challenges Kimura, a Trading Company Manager who gives any parts to racers who defeated him, but if they lose, they could never race again. However, Ryo is hired after defeating Kimura, but Ryo still feels flustered, as in the next race, Yuu challenged Ryo and Chang to a race. Ryo and Yuu started a Love Relationship since that race.

At a parking lot, Ryo saw Yuu looking a little depressed, telling Ryo about Rio, Yuu's friend whose boyfriend died in a racing accident. Ryo challenges Rio to a race to tell her that Racing should be fun, and Rio began to feel another thing after the race. The next day, Daimon (a.k.a. the Big Magnum), a fierce racer of the Red Lotuses Racing Team challenges Ryo and Yuu to a race. After having defeated Daimon, Ryo is told by Daimon to challenge Kamisaka the Silver Dragon, but at the race, Ryo is losing and his car crashed. Afterwards, Kamisaka began to realize that Ryo is Takashi's son, which gets to Ryo's mind.

Ryo and his friends went to Tokyo to race again and face the Silver Dragon. In order to defeat Kamisaka, Ryo races against Urasawa the Emperor and Itsuki the Natural Born Kid. Ryo defeats Kamisaka and Kamisaka finally realized that Ryo is Takashi's son. As everyone watches the race, Fei Long the Wyvern and his APS-ri (Nissan GT-R R35) chased the two racers, and Kamisaka is defeated, so Ryo defeats Fei Long afterwards.

Ryo however was not satisfied, and in the aftermath, his MND-Ntr was stolen, as well as Kamisaka's car, so the gang went to china, while Kamisaka visits Takashi, Ryo's father for a talk. As the group arrived in China, Urasawa arrived and gave Ryo a GD-rc (Hennessey Venom GT or Lotus Exige) to race against Bogarde from USA. The winner gets information from a Chinese Supermodel Cheimin all about Fei Long. Somehow, Chang met his brother Xun to race him and Ryo, and Cheimin met her brother Fang to race. After that, a major racing event of Japan vs China began, starting with Cheimin and Yuu participating in a race.

The event continues to Beijing, where Ryo, Chang, and the rest of the crew met other racers like Tsao, Tiger, Chen, Liu, and Lee. The event also continues back at Osaka and Tokyo, where Ryo and Yuu have another race, Kimura gets challenged by Daimon, Ryo races against a newly revived Rio, and Bogarde challenges Both Rio, and Yuu in order to get love from them. He failed, and at this point, Yuu still loves Ryo, although when Cheimin arrives at Tokyo, she will become closer to Ryo, and Rio and Daimon will probably fell in love at the end. In some of the races, Kamisaka returns with his GR022 (Mitsubishi Lancer Evolution X).

The event soon comes to an end when Chang also challenges racers as he grew up racing like Ryo, Cheimin and Fang reunite as siblings, and Ryo aims to race Fei Long again, by racing his own father at first. As Ryo and Fei Long developed more racing experience, the two decided to have another race. At the final race, Ryo saw the full reincarnation of his rival, Fei Long, who now realized that Racing should be fun, and the duo finally made their race once and for all.

== Game modes ==
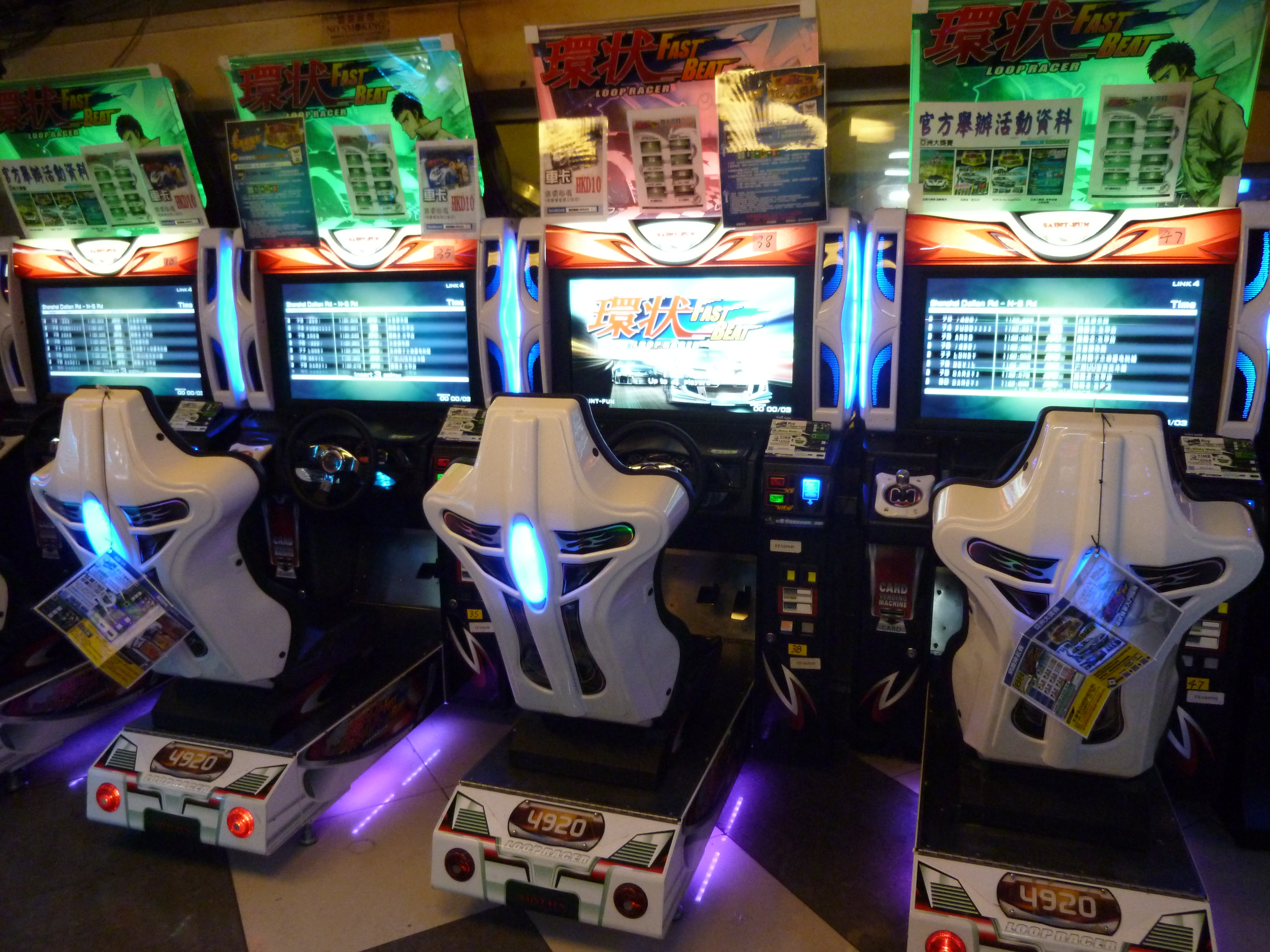
Fast Beat Loop Racer cabinet.

The game features 4 modes of play:

- Story mode: The players compete with different characters as the story moves on. Players can tune up their cars if they beat the opponent.
- Time attack mode: Players try to finish the course with the fastest time.
- Mileage mode: Players try to run the longest driving distance in the limit time.
- Multiplayer mode: Players try to beat each other in a race.

== Courses ==
There is a total of 48 courses, belonging to 4 cities. The courses are open-traffic, so players can easily drive in the wrong direction like in the Burnout series.

=== Osaka ===
- S.Osaka <-> Toyonaka
- Shonai <-> Umeda
- Tsukamoto <-> Fukushima
- Juso <-> Honmachi
- S.Osaka <-> Minamikata
- Kashima <-> Tsukamoto

=== Tokyo ===
- Akihabara <-> Komagata
- Inaricho <-> Nihonbashi
- Asakusa <-> Tachikawa
- Asakusa <-> Akihabara
- Kinshicho <-> Hamamachi
- Mukojima <-> Akihabara

=== Shanghai ===
- The Bund <-> Century
- Century Pk <-> Yanan Rd
- Yanan Rd <-> Zhongshan
- Dalian Rd <-> N-S Rd
- Century <-> Dapu Bridge
- Zhongshan <-> Century

=== Beijing ===
- Tiananmen <-> Youanmen
- Yongdingmen <-> T. Square
- Fuxingmen <-> Taiping
- Youanmen <-> T. Square
- Qinian <-> Baizhifang
- Yongan <-> Tiananmen

== Cars ==
There are 10 cars in the game, modeled after real-life vehicles:

- CBS88 (resembles Honda S2000 AP2)
- Px3800 (resembles Audi TT MK.2 [Typ 8J])
- MND-Ntr (resembles Nissan Silvia S15)
- GR022 (resembles Mitsubishi Lancer Evolution X [CZ4A])
- RC5 (resembles Toyota Supra RZ [JZA80] with Nissan V35 Skyline taillights)
- APS-ri (resembles Nissan GT-R R35 with Ferrari 599 GTB Fiorano taillights)
- Levia (resembles Subaru Impreza WRX STi Series III [GRB])
- Uroboro (resembles Nissan 370z Z34 with Nissan V36 Skyline headlights)
- F/Drake (resembles Mazda RX-7 Type R [FD3S])
- GD-rc (resembles Hennessey Venom GT and/or Lotus Exige Series 2 [Type M117])
