= Johnny Hotshot =

2012 video game

- Developer(s): UFO Interactive Games
- Publisher(s): UFO Interactive Games
- Series: Johnny
- Platform(s): Nintendo 3DS (Nintendo eShop)
- Release: NA: November 8, 2012; EU: November 15, 2012
- Genre(s): Shoot 'em up
- Mode(s): Single-player

Johnny Hotshot is an arcade shoot 'em up developed and published by UFO Interactive Games for Nintendo 3DS' now-defunct Nintendo eShop in 2012. It is the second game in the Johnny series.

== Reception ==
Reception

Aggregate score
Aggregator	Score
Metacritic	40/100

Review scores
Publication	Score
Hardcore Gamer	3.5/5
Nintendo Life	2/10 stars
Nintendo World Report	5.5/10
Pocket Gamer	1/5 stars

The game received "unfavorable" reviews according to the review aggregation website Metacritic.

== See also ==
- Johnny Kung Fu
- Johnny Impossible
