= Devilish (video game) =

1991 video game

- North American Game Gear cover art
- Developer(s): Opera House
- Publisher(s): NA: Sage's Creation; EU: Sega; JP: Genki
- Artist(s): Masayuki Suzuki
- Composer(s): Hitoshi Sakimoto
- Platform(s): Game Gear
- Release: Game Gear: NA: 1991; JP: March 29, 1991; EU: 1991
- Genre(s): Breakout clone
- Mode(s): Single-player

Devilish (デビリッシュ, Debirisshu) is an action video game that was released for the Game Gear.

A sequel for the Mega Drive was released as Devilish: The Next Possession, known in Japan as Bad Omen (バッドオーメン, Baddo Ōmen). A third title in the series known as Devilish: Ball Bounder was released for Nintendo DS in 2005.

== Plot ==
A prince and princess were in love with each other until a jealous demon turned the happy couple into a set of stone paddles; resembling that of the pinball kind. Suddenly, a ball came into existence that could use the prince and princess in order to defeat the demons that now rule over the kingdom.

== Gameplay ==
A zombie is heading towards the paddle as the player progresses through the first level

Players have to use two paddles; the upper one is used to defeat demons while the lower one helps to prevent the player from dropping to its demise at the bottom of the board. By defeating bad guys and smashing through breakable blocks, the player advances towards the boss of each level.

Resembling a harder version of Arkanoid, the vertically scrolling screen forces the ball to move constantly forward in an attempt to reach the boss.

Players can choose between three difficulty levels in the Game Gear version and can also select an option to do a time trial. The Sega Mega Drive sequel adds a two-player option.
