= Chameleon: To Dye For! =

2006 video game

Chameleon Kameleon
- European DS version cover art
- Developer(s): Starfish SD
- Publisher(s): Starfish SD; UFO Interactive Games; 505 Games; Tommo
- Platform(s): PlayStation Portable, Nintendo DS, PlayStation 4, Nintendo Switch, Microsoft Windows
- Release: January 19, 2006: PlayStation Portable; JP: January 19, 2006; EU: November 10, 2006; NA: May 5, 2008 Arcade; JP: March 9, 2006 Nintendo DS; JP: October 12, 2006; EU: March 12, 2007; NA: August 6, 2007 Nintendo Switch; NA/EU: November 26, 2019 PlayStation 4; JP: January 9, 2020 Microsoft Windows; WW: January 6, 2020
- Genre(s): Puzzle

Chameleon is a 2006 puzzle video game released for arcades, PlayStation Portable (PSP), Nintendo DS, Nintendo Switch, PlayStation 4, and Microsoft Windows. In Japan and Asia, the game is called Kuru Kuru Chameleon (くるくるカメレオン, Kuru Kuru Kamereon). In Europe, the game is called Kameleon. In America, the game was going to be called Chameleon: To Dye For!, however the name was changed to just Chameleon. The game had an Arcade release on the Sega NAOMI GD-ROM platform with the title Kuru Kuru Chameleon on March 9, 2006. In 2019, a Nintendo Switch port was released as a digital download by UFO Interactive Games in America and Tommo in Europe. Starfish SD released a PlayStation 4 port as a digital download in 2020 exclusively in Japan. Also in 2020, a Windows port was released for Steam. This game offers players simple controls and competitive play in the attempt to match colours on the playfield. The game features several playable characters along with a bonus character. Each character has her own special power, which can be used to hinder the opponent. Wireless play is also available.

== Reception ==
Reception

Aggregate score
Aggregator	Score	
Aggregator	DS	PSP
Metacritic	52/100	38/100

Review scores
Publication	Score	
Publication	DS	PSP
Famitsu	N/A	26/40
GameSpot	6/10	N/A
IGN	5.5/10	3/10
NGamer	40%	N/A

The DS version received "mixed" reviews, while the PSP version received "unfavorable" reviews, according to the review aggregation website Metacritic. In Japan, Famitsu gave the latter handheld version a score of two sevens and two sixes for a total of 26 out of 40.
