= Johnny Impossible =

2012 video game

- Developer: UFO Interactive Games
- Publisher: UFO Interactive Games
- Series: Johnny
- Platform: Nintendo 3DS (Nintendo eShop)
- Release: NA: December 27, 2012
- Genre: Platformer
- Mode: Single-player

Johnny Impossible is a platformer developed and published by UFO Interactive Games for Nintendo 3DS' now-defunct Nintendo eShop in 2012. It is the third game in the Johnny series.

== Reception ==
Reception

Aggregate score
Aggregator	Score
Metacritic	48/100

Review scores
Publication	Score
Hardcore Gamer	2.5/5
Nintendo Life	3/10 stars
Nintendo World Report	7/10

The game received "generally unfavorable reviews", albeit slightly less than the first two Johnny games, according to the review aggregation website Metacritic.

== See also ==
- Johnny Kung Fu
- Johnny Hotshot
