= Johnny Kung Fu =

2012 video game

- Developer(s): UFO Interactive Games
- Publisher(s): UFO Interactive Games
- Series: Johnny
- Platform(s): Nintendo 3DS (Nintendo eShop)
- Release: NA: July 12, 2012; EU: August 2, 2012
- Genre(s): Platformer
- Mode(s): Single-player

Johnny Kung Fu is a platformer developed and published by UFO Interactive Games for Nintendo 3DS' now-defunct Nintendo eShop in 2012. It is the first game in the Johnny series.

== Reception ==
Reception

Aggregate score
Aggregator	Score
Metacritic	44/100

Review scores
Publication	Score
Destructoid	6/10
Nintendo Life	4/10 stars
Nintendo World Report	4.5/10
Pocket Gamer	2/5 stars

The game received "unfavorable" reviews according to the review aggregation website Metacritic.

== See also ==
- Johnny Hotshot
- Johnny Impossible
