= Devilish: Ball Bounder =

2005 video game

- Developer: Starfish
- Publishers: JP: Starfish; EU: 505 Game Street; NA: UFO Interactive Games
- Series: Devilish
- Platform: Nintendo DS
- Release: JP: April 28, 2005; EU: November 16, 2005; NA: May 9, 2007
- Genre: Breakout clone
- Mode: Single-player

Devilish: Ball Bounder (デビリッシュ～ボールバウンダー～, Debirisshu: Bōru Baunda) (also known as Classic Action: Devilish) is a breakout clone video game developed by Starfish for the Nintendo DS. It is the third entry in the Devilish series, released 13 years after its predecessor, Devilish: The Next Possession for the Genesis. Like its predecessor, it is a game in the same genre of Breakout and Arkanoid, with elaborate fantasy visuals.

== Reception ==
Reception

Aggregate score
Aggregator	Score
Metacritic	40/100

Review scores
Publication	Score
GameSpot	5/10
GamesRadar+	1/5
IGN	3/10

Devilish: Ball Bounder received negative reviews from critics upon its release in North America. On Metacritic, the game holds a score of 40/100 based on 6 reviews, indicating "generally unfavorable reviews".
