= Super Bowling =

1992 video game

- North American SNES cover art
- Developer: KID
- Publishers: Athena; American Technōs; UFO Interactive Games (N64, North America)
- Producer: Yoshihisa Kishimoto
- Platforms: Super NES, Nintendo 64
- Release: Super NES: JP: July 3, 1992; NA: September 1992; Nintendo 64: JP: March 26, 1999; NA: July 12, 2000
- Genre: Bowling
- Modes: Single-player, multiplayer

Super Bowling (スーパーボウリング) is a 1992 sports video game for the Super NES and the Nintendo 64. It was developed by KID and published by Athena, originally only for the SNES. It was later picked up by American Technōs and UFO Interactive and released for the N64 in 1999.

The Nintendo 64 version was a 3D remake of the SNES version. It became a rare collector's item, with complete copies now selling for upwards of US$1,000. The game released late in the N64's lifespan, and did not sell well, which has been attributed to its rarity.

== Gameplay ==
Four computer opponents are available, two female and two male. There are three modes: Golf, Normal, and Practice where the player constructs their own scenarios and practices knocking down the bowling pins with either one or two balls.

== Reception ==
Reception

Review scores
| Publication | Score |
|---|---|
| Computer and Video Games | 62/100 |
| Electronic Gaming Monthly | 7.25/10 (Note: In Electronic Gaming Monthly'S review, three critics scored Super Bowling 7/10, one 8/10.) |
| GamePro | 3.625/5 (Note: GamePro scored Super Bowling 4/5 for graphics and fun factor, 3.5/5 for sound, and 3/5 for control.) |
| IGN | 6.7/10 |
| Joypad | 81% (Note: Joypad gave the single-player mode 78% and multi-player mode 84%.) |
| N64 Magazine | 72% |
| Nintendo Power | N64: 7.1/10; SNES: 13.6/20 |
| Video Games (DE) | 58% |
| VideoGames & Computer Entertainment | 7/10 |
| N-Force | 77% |

Entertainment Weekly gave the game a B and wrote that "while it still doesn't rack up to the real thing, at least Super Bowl (for Super NES) has a sense of humor — an animated green chicken comments on the action, the on-screen players make funny faces when they throw gutter balls, and there's a 'golf ball' option that lets you alleviate bowling's inherent lack of excitement by assigning pars for different pin setups. Unlike The Blue Marlin or Side Pocket, Super Bowling offers at least one improvement over the real-life game: Scoring is completely automatic, meaning you don't need a degree in particle physics to tabulate two spares after a strike."
