= Scourge: Outbreak =

2013 video game

- Developer: Tragnarion Studios
- Publishers: UFO Interactive (X360); TransGaming (PC); Bitbox (PS3)
- Engine: Unreal Engine 3
- Platforms: Xbox 360, Windows, OS X, PlayStation 3
- Release: Xbox 360; July 3, 2013; Windows, OS X; April 2, 2014; PlayStation 3; EU/AU: November 12, 2014; NA: December 9, 2014
- Genres: Action, third-person shooter
- Modes: Single-player, multiplayer

Scourge: Outbreak is a third-person shooter video game developed by Spanish studio Tragnarion Studios and published by UFO Interactive Games. It was originally released as an Xbox 360 exclusive title on July 3, 2013, but it was released later ported to Windows and Mac OS through Steam on April 2, 2014, and to the PlayStation 3 on December 9, 2014. The game is itself an updated version of The Scourge Project, a 2010 title that was intended as an episodic release but which failed due to overwhelmingly negative reception.

== Gameplay ==
Scourge: Outbreak is a cover-based third-person shooter, with gameplay highly influenced by the Gears of War series. The game's main campaign is based around four-player cooperative gameplay, with each player controlling one of the game's four player characters. In the game's single-player mode, the three characters not being played by the player will be controlled by the game's A.I. rather than other players.

Besides the usual cover-based shooting mechanics, the game features two special abilities; Shield and Shockwave. Shield creates an energy shield that deflects enemy projectiles, while Shockwave is an area-of-effect attack that damages all enemies near the point of detonation. Each character has a different version of the two powers; for example, "Stonewall" creates a stationary shield that he can shoot through, while "Amp" creates a mobile shield that follows her around, but is unable to shoot while maintaining the shield.

== Plot ==
The game focuses on the four members of Echo Squad, a team of mercenaries hired by the Tarn Initiative to gather evidence of wrongdoing by the villainous Nogari Corporation, who have dominated the world's energy market through their "Ambrosia" technology. Echo Squad's mission is to meet with a Nogari whistleblower, Dr. Reisbeck, and retrieve a meteorite fragment which is the source of the Ambrosia technology. However, Echo Squad's vehicle crash lands outside Nogari's island research base, and Dr. Reisbeck informs them that they were betrayed and shot down by Alpha Squad, the second Tarn Initiative team sent alongside them.

Echo Squad soon discovers that the Nogari facility is in the process of being overrun by the Scourge, a hostile alien race of creatures from which Nogari derived their Ambrosia technology, which have been set loose during the Tarn Initiative's attack on Nogari. Alpha Squad has been subverted by the Scourge, to whom they are now loyal. Echo Squad pursue Alpha Squad through the facility while battling Nogari soldiers and Scourge creatures. Meanwhile, the members of Echo Squad have periodic flashbacks of having been in the Nogari facility previously, and having turned on each other due to having conflicting agendas.

After Echo Squad succeeds in killing all 3 members of Alpha Squad, including their psychic commander, Lilith, Dr. Reisbeck contacts them and reveals that he is a Scourge operative who has been manipulating them into eliminating Lilith. Reisbeck explains that the player characters are actually Scourge clones of the real Echo Squad, who completed their original mission of retrieving the meteorite fragment before dying. The fragment was passed on to Lilith, which transformed her mind into that of a Scourge queen. Dr. Reisbeck serves another Scourge queen, who wanted Lilith eliminated due to her being a rival queen. The Echo Squad clones were created and manipulated into performing this task, due to Lilith's psychic abilities allowing her to take over and control any regular Scourge creatures. The events of the game actually take place more than a week after the real Echo Squad's drop pod was shot down in the opening scene.

Asserting their self-determination, the Echo Squad clones battle a large Scourge creature which they incorrectly assume to be Reisbeck's queen, but are unable to prevent Reisbeck from escaping. The game ends as the Scourge beginning to overrun the planet, with Reisbeck receiving new orders from his queen.

== Reception ==
The game received primarily negative reviews upon release, with the Xbox 360 version garnering a score of 40 out of 100 on the review aggregation website Metacritic.
