= The Scourge (video game) =

2026 video game

- Developers: Rare Reversee; Beaztek Studio
- Publishers: Rare Reversee; Licogame (China publishing)
- Director: Lê Đặng Nhựt Minh
- Producers: Lê Doãn Đăng Khoa; Lê Đặng Nhựt Minh
- Designers: Lê Doãn Đăng Khoa; Lê Đặng Nhựt Minh; Cao Gia Hân; Lê Nguyễn Minh Khuê
- Programmer: Hoàng Bảo Khánh
- Writer: Rare Reversee
- Composers: Frey Fox; Chiron Tuấn; Minh Châu Studio
- Engine: Unity
- Platform: Windows
- Release: 28 March 2026
- Genre: Puzzle
- Mode: Single-player

The Scourge (Vietnamese: Tai ương) is a first-person puzzle horror video game with elements of adventure, inspired by Vietnamese urban legends from the 1990s. The game was co-developed by Vietnamese company Rare Reversee – also the game's publisher – and Beaztek Studio. Set in Ho Chi Minh City between the 1970s and 1990s, the game follows Nhật Huy, a young man who is inadvertently drawn into strange phenomena at Phong Xích Lan apartment building, which then opens up a journey to investigate the mysterious death of his entire family. However, the deeper he digs, the more horrifying truths he discovers behind his family's past and the entire apartment building.

== Gameplay ==
The Scourge is an intense first-person horror game that combines adventure, puzzle, and survival gameplay. Players take on the role of Lê Đặng Nhật Huy – a young man who returns to his old apartment building to investigate the mysteries surrounding the deaths of his parents and younger sister. During his investigation, he becomes increasingly involved in a series of terrifying supernatural phenomena occurring right where he lives.

Throughout the game, players control Nhật Huy as he moves through the dark corridors and cramped spaces of the building, collecting items, reading documents, and solving puzzles to unlock new areas and gradually uncover previously hidden secrets. Without weapons for self-defense, players must rely on their observation skills, quick reflexes, and logical thinking to survive. Simultaneously, the gameplay reveals pieces of Nhật Huy's family past, leading to horrifying truths behind

== Synopsis ==
=== Plot ===
==== Chapter 1 ====
The game's opening scene takes place on the morning of 26 January 2009, after the parents of Lê Đặng Nhật Huy (Note: Based on the name of Lê Đặng Nhựt Minh (Note: Co-founder of Beaztek Studio).) passed away in a traffic accident the previous night. At that time, in the Phong Xích Lan apartment complex, Nhật Huy is holding a funeral for his parents, ignoring the gossip of his neighbors. During the funeral, he suddenly sees an illusion of Lê Đặng Nhật Huyên – his younger sister who had passed away previously. She appears covered in blood, holding her own funeral portrait to cover her face and repeatedly reaching out for help. After seeing the illusion, Nhật Huy finds himself in a surreal hallway leading to a Medium's table. According to the Medium, to find messages from the deceased, he must enter a state called a lucid dream, a place where he can be aware that he is dreaming and actively navigate his actions within it. After she finishes speaking, he appears in another hallway to receive insurance money after his parents' death, but the money he receives turns out to be stacks of hell money. Finally, he wakes up and finds himself sitting in front of a laptop. The screen displays a Zalo chat group named "Miss Phương's Fortune Telling Group" with 29 members, in which Miss Phương is the fortune teller he had met and the Medium he saw in his dream. Miss Phương instructs Nhật Huy and the other members that they need to practice every day; before dreaming, they must set their clocks, record what they dreamed about, and most importantly, they must absolutely not touch anyone in the dream, as that could lead to serious consequences, including breaking the boundary between the real world and the spiritual world. Among the messages sent, it can be seen that Nhật Huy has dropped out of school, taken out high-interest loans, and bought medicine. After checking the Zalo messages, Nhật Huy checks the clocks in the house and goes back to sleep.

==== Chapter 2 ====
In the second dream, Nhật Huy returned to his family's old house from the past. Upon entering, he uncovered a piece of his family's history. Specifically, Nhật Huy's parents had been married since 1975 but remained childless for a long time. Consequently, Nhật Huy's mother, Mrs Loan, sought out a neighbor, a sorcerer named Nguyễn Lợi Danh, to perform a ritual to conceive a child. After the ritual was completed on 17 March 1990—which is also Nhật Huy's birthday—she became pregnant and gave birth to him. From then on, the family's fortunes rose: Mr. Nhật (his father) was promoted, and their finances flourished. Not long after, Mrs. Loan became pregnant again and gave birth to a younger sister, Nhật Huyên. The scene shifts to Nhật Huyên's birthday: while preparing for the party, a neighbor suddenly bangs on the door demanding debt repayment. Nhật Huy realizes that his father is entangled in an illegal business deal, causing his career to spiral downward from that point. Burdened by debt, the family is forced to sell most of their assets and rent out part of their house. Unable to endure the life of poverty, Mrs. Loan once again turns to their neighbor, Master Lợi Danh. Master Lợi Danh sends a letter claiming that the source of their misfortune is Nhật Huyên and that he will perform a ritual to dispel the bad luck for her in the near future.

Nhật Huy later finds several drawings by his sister, including one where Nhật Huyên is playing with an imaginary friend that looks like a giant octopus. Nhật Huy then collapses, waking up in front of the altar of his parents and sister, with the floor covered in torn papers. While cleaning up, Nhật Huy discovers an anonymous letter in the funeral donation box from "T.Ư." Once finished, the lights begin to flicker, and Nhật Huy sees a pitch-black portal cordoned off with red string; a hand reaches out accompanied by Nhật Huyên's voice. Desperate to find the truth, Nhật Huy breaks the taboo of touching someone within a dream. The hand immediately pulls Nhật Huy into the doorway, causing him to fall into a deeper layer of the dream.

Nhật Huy wakes up and finds himself lying in his room, but everything is very strange: the "Co Phuong Fortune Telling Group" now has chaotic chat bubbles, the group members have increased to 666, the "Ph" in Miss Phương's name is blurred, and all of Nhật Huy's family members are in the group. Additionally, there are messages from others stating that Nhật Huy's family is waiting for him and that taking medicine is useless. The funeral photos in the house have also changed, all featuring a gruesome smile. Nhật Huy then goes to adjust the clock; when he returns to sleep, he sees Nhật Huyên crawling out of a drawer, weeping as she moves toward him. The house is now filled with the words "I'm sorry, sister," even on his ID card. Nhật Huy steps outside as the scene shifts to the day of the ritual.

While witnessing the ritual, he discovers Master Lợi Danh molesting his mother in a private room on 2 September 1998. Three days later, the ritual begins. As Master Lợi Danh pours chicken blood over Nhật Huyên's head, Nhật Huy feels as if he is drowning in a sea of blood. When he wakes up, he enters a maze and must flee from Mr. Nhật, who is hunting him down.

While on the run, he discovered more truths about his younger sister: although she didn't do well in school, she had a talent for painting. However, Mr. Nhật had forbidden her from drawing and destroyed all her paints by flushing them down the toilet. Nhật Huyên was also forced to drop out after finishing 9th grade because the family couldn't afford to send both of them to high school. Furthermore, her mother forced her to chant sutras and strike the wooden fish to pray for her father and brother's career success. Yet, when Nhật Huy was little, seeing his mother brush his sister's hair and say those things, he didn't realize how much she was suffering.

Then, Nhật Huy discovered Nhật Huyên hovering over the graves; so he went to find her belongings and placed them in front of those graves. Afterward, a sudden supernatural phenomenon occurred. Nhật Huyên's soul transformed into a giant ghostly entity. Terrified, Nhật Huy was forced to flee. While running, he found a motorcycle and hurriedly drove away, witnessing the true cause of his parents' death—they had been "blinded by ghosts and led astray by demons."

Immediately after, Nhật Huy appeared in a room covered in talismans, facing a cabinet sealed with four nails. At this moment, a mysterious voice echoed from a jar containing a pickled human head on top of the cabinet. The person identified himself as Trần Đại Cường—a sorcerer who had been secretly watching him for a long time and had revealed secrets about the Phong Xích Lan apartment complex in general, and Nhật Huy's family in particular, through radios in his dreams. Master Đại Cường asked Nhật Huy to pull out the nails so he could give him a bag of exorcism powder labeled "Phương," warning him to stay calm when entering the Calamity Hell, because "Calamity Hell is the hell within the mind." When Nhat Huy opened the cabinet, he saw a massive, headless cockroach body inside, its legs twitching and holding a bag of exorcism powder.

After obtaining the powder, Nhật Huy entered the Calamity Hell.

==== Chapter 3 ====
Upon entering the Calamity Hell, Nhật Huy finds himself in front of a ticket booth for the Water Gate at Đồng Sen Cultural Park. After handing over his ticket and signing in, a bamboo ladder drops from the ceiling, leading Nhật Huy to the first floor of the Water Gate; this floor consists of a warding Banyan tree and a red elevator leading to the rooftop. As he approaches the elevator, there is a face-washing area to exchange tickets, forcing Nhật Huy to wash his face before he can enter the elevator. Once Nhật Huy finishes washing his face, all the teeth in his mouth fall out, and Mother Puppet rises from the water. Nhật Huy uses Mother Puppet to reach the 2nd floor and enters the Kingdom of Sewing machines.

Entering the Kingdom of Sewing Machines, Nhật Huy discovers a spider-like monster crawling on all fours on the ceiling, forcing him to constantly hide inside large jars. After escaping the monster, he enters the Hell of Lies. In this hell, after solving a maze, he reaches a fairground shooting gallery and receives a letter from his grandfather—Mrs. Loan's father-in-law—inside a funeral donation box. In this letter, his grandfather tried to cover up the fact that Mr. Nhật was having an affair. After walking a long distance, Nhật Huy reaches the Kingdom of Illusions. Here, he realizes that the monster is actually his mother—whose eyes have been gouged out and tongue cut off—crawling and sprawling on the floor. He takes his mother's eyes and tongue and puts them into a pepper grinder to exchange for Mother Puppet after being punished, then enters the Garden of Truth.

Stepping into the Garden of Truth, Nhật Huy wakes up in his old room. At this time, his mother had bought him a new pair of shoes. He also finds evidence showing that to buy these shoes, his mother stole 13 batches of autumn-model black jackets from the company to sell outside, and forced his younger sister to sell her long hair. Nhật Huy then sees his sister—now with short hair—mopping the floor while instructing him how to mop, and then receives a star sticker. Through a letter from Master Đại Cường, we learn that these are fragments of memory, and Nhật Huy needs to destroy them immediately after collecting all 3 pieces.

Nhật Huy takes the scissor to cut through the hair barrier, finds his sister's grave, and solves a puzzle. But after finishing, he realizes this isn't his sister's grave, but the grave of someone named Phạm Phương. Ms. Phương grabs Nhật Huy's hand, mistaking him for Lợi Danh—her younger brother. Frustrated, Nhật Huy asks Ms. Phương for information about his sister, but Ms. Phương says that the person who brought Nhật Huy here wasn't her, but rather Calamity using her identity to lure him in. Ms. Phương then spits out some bone powder for Nhật Huy to disguise his scent as a living person.

After disguising himself, Nhật Huy goes outside and takes a swan paddle boat to the passage to the 3rd floor. Outside the door, he finds a stone heart engraved with self-worth. Going a bit deeper, Nhật Huy has to wash his face again to exchange tickets. Here, he exchanges his own face to get Father Puppet, while simultaneously realizing that inside him is a water puppet. He places Father Puppet into the elevator to go up to the 3rd floor of the Water Gate.

On the 3rd floor, he sees two more stone hearts engraved with self-worth, along with the imagery of Rich Dad Poor Dad in the Mysterious Scales area. Here, to enter the Kingdom of Crocodiles, he must balance the scales between the rich and poor versions of his father. After completing the task, he realizes that when his father was rich, he only let the uncle in the family work as a porter to demolish abandoned factories, so when he became poor, he also had to do that same heavy labor. You reap what you sow.

Entering the Kingdom of Crocodiles, he sees crocodiles swimming in a toilet filled with the wax crayons that his father had destroyed of Nhật Huyên's. Here, he used Father Puppet to drop into the toilet to distract the crocodiles and collect a full set of wax crayons to enter the red elevator to the 4th floor of the Water Gate.

==== Chapter 4 ====
In the 4th level of Thuỷ Môn Quan, Nhật Huy returns to apartment 413 in the Phong Xích Lan apartment complex. Here he reunites with Nhật Huyên, who tells him that the wine jars are watching her and makes her very scared. Nhật Huy immediately goes to burn the paper figures pasted on the wine jars and discovers that his father's creditors once asked him to sell her to them to "dispel bad luck." After burning the figures, Nhật Huy has to light the way for Nhật Huyên to escape from perverted black holes. Upon leaving those places, Nhật Huy returns to the time he was studying for university entrance exams; and he hears Mr. Nhật going mad and smashing the dinner tray after hearing a creditor suggested handing over his daughter to pay the debt.

While cleaning up, Nhật Huy discovers a general check-up and test result slip belonging to someone. Nhật Huy also hears the sound of his sister washing dishes while instructing him on how to stack them; but before she can finish, she is shouted at by Mr. Nhật. Nhật Huyên then turns into a comet sticker, bringing Nhật Huy back to Ms. Phương's grave.

Ms. Phương returns and gives Nhật Huy a bit more bone powder, while asking if he is sure the person he is looking for is his sister, and who he need to show filial piety with his life. Nhật Huy uses the bone powder as camouflage and pedals the swan boat to the gate leading to the 4th level: which is also the home of the Calamity. While washing his face, the puppet part leaves Nhật Huy's body, leaving a massive hole in his face. Nhật Huy then reaches into the black hole and pulls out a Huy Puppet, then uses his puppet to go up to the 4th level.

Stepping out of the 4th level, he encounters puppets staring at him, and then his clone appears, kicking him in the face. Afterward, the clone disappears, and he appears in the "Anh Hai Say No" event. In this event, he participates in the Mathematics Arena, where he must face the time he gave his sister the wrong answers for her homework just because he was eager to go play soccer with his friends. But due to some event, he no longer plays soccer. After finishing the Math, he returns to the old hallway and enters the house of the sorcerer Lợi Danh. Here he sees the Trần family tree and learns the truth: the sorcerer Lợi Danh's real name is Trần Lợi Danh, his father is Trần Đại Cường, he has a half-sister named Trần Phạm Phương, and a son named Trần Đặng Nhật Huy—who is our main character. Nhật Huy then finds the home care papers that Mr. Đại Cường made for Ms. Phương, who at that time had a terminal illness and was beyond cure.

Exploring the house further, he participates in a game of "Ô ăn nhau" (Mandarin Square Capturing) with someone; and if he loses, he will be eaten by a monster. After defeating his opponent, Nhật Huy crawls down the fireplace and goes to the end of the path to receive a reward. In the reward room, the walls are hung with corpses of Nhật Huys, and the reward is a "Wisdom" brand oil lamp. Opposite the oil lamp table is a cage holding a monster. Its voice and appearance look very much like the sorcerer Lợi Danh.

When Nhật Huy opens his eyes, he sees himself sitting at the dining table with his family, but this time Mrs. Loan and Mr. Nhat have burlap sacks over their heads, and the food on the table consists of eerie dishes: blood soup with eyes, hand soup, whole bloody fish... and the rice has a pair of chopsticks with rising incense smoke stuck in the middle. Mrs. Loan picks up the chopsticks, taps the bowl twice, and begins to make sweet promises; Mr. Nhật also starts promising good things; but when it's Nhật Huy's turn, he can't promise anything. Suddenly, both of them begin to weigh down on Nhật Huy with academic pressure and start comparing him to this person and that person, while making him fall into a ring where he has to box with "The Neighbor's Kid." And naturally, he fails when he is knocked out by a punch.

When he wakes up, he finds himself back on the day of his sister's funeral, still holding her portrait. His mother is crying, while his father is cursing and berating. Unable to take it anymore, Nhật Huy's emotions explode and he gets into a fistfight with his father. After calming down, he returns to the day of his parents' funeral. While bowing in prayer, he sees Nhật Huyên walk in, saying she has something to tell him before leaving. Nhật Huy chases after her and sees his sister already sitting in the swan boat. Nhật Huyên asks how he is and then tell him to meet her on the rooftop at seven o'clock, before turning into a moon sticker and taking him back to Ms. Phương's grave.

Ms. Phương says that what he brought back is not his sister, and he has also lost the scent of the living, so he needs to move fast lest he merge with the Calamity Hell. Suddenly, an earthquake occurs. At this point, the player has two choices: destroy to eliminate the Calamity or do not destroy. If destroyed, the player will reach Ending 1.

If not, Nhật Huy will untangle the roots. Memory fragments then guide him away from the pursuit of a horde of vengeful spirits. At the end of the tunnel, Nhật Huy reaches the final point of Thuỷ Môn Quan, and now needs to fulfill his promise to Nhật Huyên to meet on the rooftop at 7 o'clock. There are two paths for Nhật Huy at this point: the easy path leads to Ending 2, and the arduous path leads to Ending 3.

=== Endings ===
==== Ending 1: The Void ====
Nhật Huy uses the oil lamp to burn the three memory fragments. At this moment, Nhật Huy turns into a puppet with a large hole in his chest and burns along with the flames.

==== Ending 2: The Feast ====
Nhật Huy uses the 3 memory fragments to unlock priority paths leading straight to the rooftop. He then climbs onto a giant kite and flies to a banquet. At the banquet, he sees the Calamity Demon, his mother – the Sewing Machine Demon, his father – the Knife-Wielding Demon, the sorcerer Đại Cường, Ms. Phương holding the head of the sorcerer Lợi Danh, and Nhật Huyen. On the table is his own corpse – now covered with a mat, and his current body is a wooden puppet. Taking the shortcut has caused Nhat Huy to belong entirely to the Calamity Hell, and to celebrate, everyone will gnaw on his sins.

Nhật Huy later wakes up, his hand forming the Calamity seal, signaling that the Calamity Demon has completely taken over his body.

==== Ending 3: The Lotus ====
Nhật Huy chooses the difficult path, escaping the challenges without needing to use any memory fragments. However, this also means he cannot get onto the giant kite. Nhật Huy's body turns to stone and falls freely from the Thuỷ Môn Quan rooftop. In the darkness of the abyss, the three memory fragments appear, saving him from petrification and guiding him to a glowing gate.

Stepping inside, Nhật Huy arrives at a beautiful lotus pond. Wherever he steps, lotus leaves grow, leading him to the rooftop of the Phong Xich Lan apartment complex where Nhật Huyên is flying a paper kite. Nhật Huy takes the kite, lets it go, and flies away with it.

As the game ends, the player sees an image of Nhật Huy washing dishes. His son holds a kite to show his father, and from a distance, his younger sister happily calls her brother to go fly kites.

== Inspiration ==
=== The Apartment ===
The main setting in the game is an apartment building called Phong Xích Lan in Ward 4, District 13, Sài Gòn, where Nhật Huy's family lived until all of his relatives passed away, leaving only Nhật Huy as the only one survive. Notably, this building is based on a real location in Hồ Chí Minh City, namely the 727 Trần Hưng Đạo apartment building. At the same time, elements of Phong Xích Lan's past are also modeled after urban legends surrounding this famous apartment building.

In addition, the name of the Phong Xích Lan apartment building is actually an anagram of the name 'Phan Xích Long', which is also a real street located in Phú Nhuận district.

=== The Scourging ===
In The Scourging, also known as The Lair of The Scourge is Thuỷ Môn Quan at Đồng Sơn Park.

Kite Pier			Red Elevator	–	
Floor 4	Math Arena	Hot Bros Say No/Monster Capture	Red Elevator	Kingdom of Illusion 3	Garden of Truth 3
Floor 3	Mystic Scale	Crocodile Kingdom	Red Elevator	Kingdom of Illusion 2	Garden of Truth 2
Floor 2	Sewing machine Kingdom		Red Elevator	Kingdom of Illusion	Garden of Truth
Floor 1	Majestic Tree		Red Elevator	← Path to the Kite Pier	

In reality, these places are completely unrelated: the games are inspired by the Suối Tiên Cultural Tourist Area, the name in the ticket of Đồng Sen Cultural Park is actually Đầm Sen Cultural Park, and Thuỷ Môn Quan (Gate of Water) is a pun of Quỷ Môn Quan (Chinese: 鬼門关, romanized: guǐménguān), the gates of hell in Chinese mythology – and water, due to Đầm Sen being a water park.

=== Culture ===
Water puppetry plays a leading role in expressing metaphorical images. Water puppetry represents characters controlled by invisible forces. For the family in the story, these are cultural norms, tradition, and spiritual beliefs, all of which create invisible shackles that prevent them from acting freely or escaping psychological constraints.

Besides water puppetry, The Scourge also uses Chữ Nôm to write on talismans instead of Han script as is commonly seen in films.

=== Trivia ===
In addition, The Scourge also features elements inspired by real-life situations, such as:

- Thịnh Châu Pharmacy – inspired by Long Châu Pharmacy, popular for selling medicines with cheap price.
- Hot Bros Say No (Vietnamese: Anh Hai Say No) – inspired by Anh trai "say hi" – a survival show emulating Anh trai vượt ngàn chông gai which is the official Vietnamese version of Chinese show Call Me by Fire.
- Vạn Khoa University – inspired by Hanoi University of Science and Technology (Vietnamese name for HUST is Bách Khoa – Bách means a hundred, Vạn means a thousand).
- Monster Capture – inspired by the traditional Vietnamese game ô ăn quan (Vietnamese Mancala).

== Characters ==
=== Main ===
Name	Full name	Voice actors	Description
Nhật Huy	Lê Đặng Nhật Huy; Trần Đặng Nhật Huy	Lâm Gia Châu; Lưu Ái Phương	Playable character. The son of Mr Nhật and Mrs Loan. In the game, Nhật Huy got caught up in strange phenomena at Phong Xích Lan apartment building, then begins a journey to learn about the mysterious death of his whole family.
Nhật Huyên	Lê Đặng Nhật Huyên	Nguyễn Hoàng Thiên Thư; Kitty	The family's youngest daughter, and Nhật Huy's younger sister, died when she was just 15 years old. When she was alive, she was a victim of misogyny.
Mr Nhật	Lê Hoàng Nhật	Lý Gia Huy (Frey Fox)	Nhật Huy and Nhật Huyên's father, passed away along with his wife Mrs Loan in a traffic accident. He is a strict civil servant. As a misogynist, he always torments his daughter and pampers his son.
Mrs Loan	Đặng Thị Loan	Nguyễn Hoàng Thiên Thư	Nhật Huy and Nhật Huyên's mother, a seamstress, passed away with Mr Nhật in a traffic accident. Mrs Loan is a spineless person. Due to the effect of misogyny, she loves her children but is too partial to her son.

=== Side ===
Name	Full name	Voice actors	Description
Shaman Lady; Miss Phương; Phương Nguyễn		Nguyễn Hà Phương	A shaman on social medias. She was the one who guided Nhật Huy on how to enter lucid dream so he could contact Nhật Huyên and revive the harsh memories of the past.
Shaman	Trần Đại Cường	MC Nguyễn Thành	The best shaman in Southern Việt Nam. His name is a pun of the Chinese nickname Xiaoqiang 小強 (literal transcript in Vietnamese: Tiểu Cường) for small cockroaches. Tiểu means small, Đại means big; his name is literally "huge cockroach".
Sorcerer	Nguyễn Lợi Danh; Trần Lợi Danh	Lý Gia Huy (Frey Fox)	The foremost disciple of the best shaman in Southern Việt Nam. Specializes in performing rituals for "seeking offspring" "exorcising spirits," and "warding off misfortune."
Ms Phương	Trần Phạm Phương (Note: This is an anagram of the name of the singer Phạm Trần Phương – whose songs being the background music in the main screen and the bad endings)	Nguyễn Hà Phương	Daughter of Đại Cường, and half-sister of Shaman Lợi Danh. She suffered from a terminal illness and died young.
Kite boy		Bé Tôm	
Kite girl		Suri Hạ Anh	
Neighbours		Lê Trung Nghị, Cao Gia Hân, Nguyễn Hà Phương, Nguyễn Hoàng Thiên Thư, Lê Đặng Nhựt Minh, Huỳnh Thế Hoà, Lâm Gia Châu, Lý Gia Huy (Frey Fox), Hoài Linh, Phan Ngọc Thịnh (DevVipPro), Nguyễn Đăng Khoa, Lưu Văn Huynh, Chiron Tuấn, Minh Mai (Mia), Minh Huy, Vy Tăng	

== Release ==
The Scourge was first released as a free demo on Steam on 17 September 2023, which allowed players to experience the beginning of the game, including exploring the Phong Xích Lan apartment building and experiencing the initial supernatural elements. The game was launched as early access on 23 October 2024, also on Steam. This early access version included the first two chapters out of a total of four.

On 7 February 2026, Rare Reversee released the official trailer of The Scourge. The game was officially released on Steam, Xbox and Epic Games Store on 28 March 2026.

== Soundtrack ==
Frey Fox is the game's principal composer. The game includes four songs: "0 Giờ" and "Đếm Cừu" performed by Phạm Trần Phương, "Qua cầu vía bay" by The Flob, and "Tàn dư" by Humm. "0 Giờ" is used as the main background music for the loading screen. The other three songs serve as background music for different endings: "Đếm Cừu" for the bad ending, "Tàn dư" for the good ending, and "Qua cầu vía bay" for the realistic ending. "Qua cầu vía bay" was composed specifically for the game, while the other songs were released previously.

In addition, the Rare Reversee team spent a year and a half composing and designing the sound. Currently, The Scourge comprises 23 songs, each composed based on the game's storyline.

== Award ==
Year	Award	Category	Nomination	Result	Source
2024	Vietnam GameVerse 2024	GameHub	The Scourge	Won	
