= List of third-person shooters =

This is an index of notable commercial third-person shooter video games, sorted alphabetically by title. The developer, platform, and release date are provided where available. The table can be sorted by clicking on the small boxes next to the column headings.

Third-person shooter (TPS) is a subgenre of shooter video games in which the player character is visible on-screen, and the gameplay consists primarily of shooting.

== Legend ==
Video game platforms
3DS	Nintendo 3DS, 3DS Virtual Console, iQue 3DS	AMI	Amiga	APPII	Apple II
ARC	Acorn Archimedes	Arcade	Arcade video game	C64	Commodore 64
CPC	Amstrad CPC	DC	Dreamcast	DOS	PC DOS / MS-DOS, Windows 3.X
DROID	Android	DS	Nintendo DS, DSiWare, iQue DS	FDS	Famicom Disk System
FMT	FM Towns	GBA	Game Boy Advance, iQue GBA	GCN	GameCube
iOS	iOS, iPhone, iPod, iPadOS, iPad, visionOS, Apple Vision Pro	LIN	Linux, SteamOS	MAC	Classic Mac OS, 2001 and before
MOBI	Mobile phone	N64	Nintendo 64, iQue Player	NEO	Neo Geo AES
NEOCD	Neo Geo CD	NES	Nintendo Entertainment System / Famicom	NGE	N-Gage
NS	Nintendo Switch	NS2	Nintendo Switch 2	OSX	macOS
PDP1	PDP-1	PS1	PlayStation 1	PS2	PlayStation 2
PS3	PlayStation 3	PS4	PlayStation 4	PS5	PlayStation 5
PSN	PlayStation Network	PSP	PlayStation Portable	PSV	PlayStation Vita
SAT	Sega Saturn	SNES	Super NES / Super Famicom / Super Comboy	VBOY	Virtual Boy
Wii	Wii, WiiWare, Wii Virtual Console	WiiU	Wii U, WiiU Virtual Console	WIN	Windows, all versions Windows 95 and up
XB360	Xbox 360, Xbox 360 Live Arcade	XB	Xbox, Xbox Live Arcade	XBO	Xbox One
XBX/S	Xbox Series X/S	ZX	ZX Spectrum		

== List ==
Title	Year	Platform(s)	Developer	Ref.
007: Quantum of Solace	2008	PS2, DS	Eurocom, Vicarious Visions	
007: Tomorrow Never Dies	1999	PS1	Black Ops Entertainment	
25 to Life	2006	WIN, PS2, XB	Avalanche Software, Ritual Entertainment	
3-D WorldRunner	1987	FDS, NES	Square	
The 3rd Birthday	2010	PSP	HexaDrive	
50 Cent: Blood on the Sand	2009	PS3, XB360	Swordfish Studios	
50 Cent: Bulletproof	2005	PS2, PSP, XB	Genuine Games	
Advent Rising	2005	XB, WIN	GlyphX Games	
Afterfall: Insanity	2011	WIN	Intoxicate Studios	
Agents of Mayhem	2017	WIN, PS4, XBO	Volition	
Airheart	1986	APPII	Dan Gorlin	
Alan Wake	2010	XB360, WIN, PS4, PS5, XBO, XBX/S, NS	Remedy Entertainment	
Alan Wake 2	2023	WIN, PS5, XBX/S	Remedy Entertainment	
Alan Wake's American Nightmare	2012	XB360, WIN, PS4, PS5, XBO, XBX/S, NS	Remedy Entertainment	
Aliens: Fireteam Elite	2021	WIN, PS4, PS5, XBO, XBX/S, NS	Cold Iron Studios	
Alone in the Dark: Illumination	2015	WIN	Pure FPS	
Alpha Protocol	2010	WIN, PS3, XB360	Obsidian Entertainment	
American McGee's Alice	2000	WIN, MAC, PS3, XB360	Rogue Entertainment	
Anthem	2019	WIN, PS4, XBO	BioWare	
APB: All Points Bulletin	2010	WIN, XBO, PS4	Realtime Worlds	
Apocalypse	1998	PS1	Neversoft	
Apocalyptica	2003	WIN	Extreme FX	
ARC Raiders	2025	WIN, PS5, XBX/S	Embark studios	
Armed and Dangerous	2003	WIN, XB	Planet Moon Studios	
Armored Core V	2012	PS3, XB360	FromSoftware	
Armored Core VI: Fires of Rubicon	2023	WIN, PS4, PS5, XBO, XBX/S	FromSoftware	
Army of Two	2008	PS3, XB360	EA Montreal	
Army of Two: The 40th Day	2010	PS3, XB360, PSP	EA Montreal	
Army of Two: The Devil's Cartel	2013	PS3, XB360	Visceral Games, EA Montreal	
Avatar: The Game	2009	WIN, PS3, XB360, Wii, iOS, DROID	Ubisoft Montreal	
Bad Boys: Miami Takedown	2004	WIN, PS2, XB, GCN	Blitz Games	
Battlefield Heroes	2009	WIN	DICE, Easy Studios	
Beyond Forbidden Forest	1985	C64	Cosmi Corporation	
Binary Domain	2012	PS3, WIN, XB360	Ryu Ga Gotoku Studio	
Bionic Commando	2009	PS3, XB360, WIN	Grin	
Bionicle Heroes	2006	DS, GBA, GCN, PS2, XB360, Wii, WIN	TT Games	
Blasto	1998	PS1	Sony Interactive	
Border Break	2009	Arcade, PS4	Sega AM2	
Brothers in Arms DS	2007	DS	Gameloft	
Brothers in Arms: Hour of Heroes	2008	iOS	Gameloft	
Brute Force	2003	XB	Digital Anvil	
Bullet Witch	2006	XB360, WIN	Cavia	
The Bureau: XCOM Declassified	2013	WIN, PS3, XB360, OSX	2K Marin	
Burning Rangers	1998	SAT	Sonic Team	
C The Contra Adventure	1998	PS1	Appaloosa Interactive	
C-12: Final Resistance	2001	PS1	SCE Studio Cambridge	
Cabal	1988	ARC, AMI, CPC, C64, ZX, DOS, NES	TAD Corporation	
Cartoon Network Universe: FusionFall	2009	OSX, WIN	Grigon Entertainment	
The Club	2008	WIN, PS3, XB360	Bizarre Creations	
Cold Fear	2005	WIN, PS2, XB	Darkworks	
Command & Conquer: Renegade	2002	WIN	Westwood Studios	
Computer Space	1971	ARC	Syzygy Engineering	
Conflict: Desert Storm	2002	WIN, PS2, XB, GCN	Pivotal Games	
Conflict: Desert Storm II	2003	WIN, PS2, XB, GCN	Pivotal Games	
Conflict: Global Terror	2005	WIN, PS2, XB	Pivotal Games	
Conflict: Vietnam	2004	WIN, PS2, XB	Pivotal Games	
Control	2019	PS4, XBO, WIN, NS, PS5, XBX/S	Remedy Entertainment	
Cosmic Break	2008	WIN	CyberStep	
Crackdown	2007	XB360	Realtime Worlds	
Crackdown 2	2010	XB360	Ruffian Games	
Crackdown 3	2019	WIN, XBO	Sumo Digital	
CrimeCraft	2009	WIN	Vogster Entertainment	
Crimson Sea	2002	XB	Koei	
Cronos: The New Dawn	2025	WIN, PS5, XBX/S, LIN, OSX, NS	Bloober Team	
CT Special Forces: Fire for Effect	2005	WIN, PS2, XB	Asobo Studio	
Cyber Sled	1993	Arcade, PS1, PSN	Namco	
D.i.R.T.: Origin of the Species	2006	WIN	Nu Generation Games	
Damnation	2009	WIN, PS3, XB360	Blue Omega Entertainment, Point of View	
Danganronpa Another Episode: Ultra Despair Girls	2014	PS4, PSV, WIN	Spike Chunsoft	
Dark Sector	2008	PS3, WIN, XB360	Digital Extremes	
Dark Void	2010	WIN, PS3, XB360	Airtight Games	
Days Gone	2019	PS4, WIN	Bend Studio	
Dead Rising 3	2013	XBO, WIN	Capcom Vancouver	
Dead Rising 4	2016	WIN, XBO, PS4	Capcom Vancouver	
Dead Space	2008	WIN, PS3, XB360	EA Redwood Shores	
Dead Space	2023	WIN, PS5, XBX/S	Motive Studio	
Dead Space	2011	iOS, DROID	IronMonkey Studios	
Dead Space 2	2011	WIN, PS3, XB360	Visceral Games	
Dead Space 3	2013	WIN, PS3, XB360	Visceral Games	
Dead to Rights	2002	XB, PS2, GCN, WIN	Namco Hometek	
Dead to Rights II	2005	PS2, XB, WIN	Widescreen Games	
Dead to Rights: Reckoning	2005	PSP	Rebellion Developments	
Dead to Rights: Retribution	2010	PS3, XB360	Volatile Games	
Deadlock	TBA	WIN	Valve	
Deadpool	2013	WIN, PS3, XB360, PS4, XBO	High Moon Studios	
Death to Spies	2007	WIN	Haggard Games	
DeathDrome	1996	WIN	Zipper Interactive	
Defiance	2013	WIN, PS3, XB360	Trion Worlds	
Destroy All Humans!	2005	PS2, XB	Pandemic Studios	
Destroy All Humans! 2	2006	PS2, XB	Pandemic Studios	
Destroy All Humans! Big Willy Unleashed	2008	Wii	Locomotive Games	
Destroy All Humans! Path of the Furon	2008	PS3, XB360	Sandblast Games	
Devastators	1988	Arcade	Konami	
The Devil Inside	2000	WIN	Gamesquad	
Devil's Third	2015	WiiU	Valhalla Game Studios	
Die Hard	1989	DOS	Dynamix	
Die Hard Trilogy	1996	PS1, WIN, SAT	Probe Entertainment	
Die Hard Trilogy 2: Viva Las Vegas	2000	PS1, WIN	n-Space	
Dirge of Cerberus: Final Fantasy VII	2006	PS2	Square Enix	
Dragon Drive: D-Masters Shot	2003	GCN	Treasure	
Drake of the 99 Dragons	2003	XB, WIN	Idol FX	
DRIV3R	2004	PS2, XB, MOBI, WIN, GBA	Reflections Interactive	
Driver 76	2007	PSP	Ubisoft Reflections, Sumo Digital	
Driver: Parallel Lines	2006	PS2, XB, WIN, Wii	Reflections Interactive	
Duke Nukem: Land of the Babes	2000	PS1	n-Space	
Duke Nukem: Time to Kill	1998	PS1	n-Space	
Duke Nukem: Zero Hour	1999	N64	Eurocom	
E.X. Troopers	2012	3DS, PS3	Capcom	
Earth Defense Force 2017	2006	PSV, XB360	Sandlot	
Earth Defense Force 2025	2013	PS3, XB360	Sandlot	
Earth Defense Force 4.1: The Shadow of New Despair	2015	PS4, WIN	Sandlot	
Earth Defense Force 5	2017	PS4, WIN	Sandlot	
Eat Lead: The Return of Matt Hazard	2009	PS3, XB360	Vicious Cycle Software	
El Matador	2006	WIN	Plastic Reality Technologies	
Elite Warriors: Vietnam	2005	WIN	nFusion Interactive	
Eradicator	1996	DOS	Accolade	
Evil West	2022	WIN, PS4, PS5, XBO, XBX/S	Flying Wild Hog	
The Evil Within	2014	PS3, PS4, WIN, XB360, XBO	Tango Gameworks	
The Evil Within 2	2017	PS4, WIN, XBO	Tango Gameworks	
Exteel	2007	WIN	NCsoft	
Fade to Black	1995	DOS, PS1	Delphine Software International	
Fallen Earth	2009	WIN	Icarus Studios, Fallen Earth	
The First Descendant	2024	WIN, PS4, PS5, XBO, XBX/S	Nexon	
Fortnite	2017	WIN, PS5, PS4, XBX/S, XBO, NS, OSX, iOS, DROID	Epic Games	
Fracture	2008	PS3, XB360	Day 1 Studios	
Freedom Fighters	2003	GCN, PS2, WIN, XB	IO Interactive	
Fur Fighters	2000	DC, PS2, WIN, iOS	Bizarre Creations	
Fuse	2013	XB360, PS3	Insomniac Games	
Future Cop: LAPD	1998	MAC, PS1, WIN	EA Redwood Shores	
Galaxy Game	1971	ARC	Bill Pitts, Hugh Tuck	
Gangs of London	2006	PSP	London Studio	
Garena Free Fire	2017	DROID, iOS	111dots Studio & Garena	
Gears 5	2019	WIN, XBO, XBX/S	The Coalition	
Gears 5: Hivebusters	2020	WIN, XBO, XBX/S	The Coalition	
Gears of War	2006	XB360, WIN	Epic Games	
Gears of War 2	2008	XB360	Epic Games	
Gears of War 3	2011	XB360	Epic Games	
Gears of War 4	2016	WIN, XBO	The Coalition	
Gears of War: E-Day	2026	WIN, XSX/X	The Coalition, People Can Fly	
Gears of War: Judgment	2013	XB360	People Can Fly, Epic Games	
Gears of War: Ultimate Edition	2015	XBO, WIN, PS5, XBX/S	The Coalition	
The Getaway	2002	PS2	Team Soho	
The Getaway: Black Monday	2004	PS2	London Studio	
Ghost in the Shell	1997	PS1	Exact	
Ghost in the Shell: Stand Alone Complex	2004	PS2	Cavia	
Ghostbusters: The Video Game	2009	DS, PS3, PS2, PSP, XB360, Wii, WIN, PS4, XBO, NS	Terminal Reality	
Ghosthunter	2003	PS2, PS4, PS5	SCEE Cambridge Studio	
Giants: Citizen Kabuto	2000	PS2, OSX, WIN	Planet Moon Studios	
Global Agenda	2010	WIN	Hi-Rez Studios	
Global Defence Force	2005	PS2, PSP, PSV	Sandlot	
Goddess of Victory: Nikke	2022	DROID, iOS, WIN	Shift Up	
The Godfather	2006	WIN, PS2, XB, XB360, PSP, PS3, Wii	EA Redwood Shores	
The Godfather II	2009	WIN, PS3, XB360	EA Redwood Shores	
Grand Theft Auto III	2001	PS2, WIN, XB, OSX, iOS, DROID, PS4, PS5, XBO, XBX/S, NS	DMA Design	
Grand Theft Auto IV	2008	PS3, XB360, WIN	Rockstar North	
Grand Theft Auto IV: The Lost and Damned	2009	XB360, WIN, PS3	Rockstar North	
Grand Theft Auto V	2013	PS3, XB360, PS4, XBO, WIN, PS5, XBX/S	Rockstar North	
Grand Theft Auto VI	2026	PS5, XBX/S	Rockstar Games	
Grand Theft Auto: Liberty City Stories	2005	PSP, PS2, iOS, DROID	Rockstar Leeds, Rockstar North	
Grand Theft Auto: San Andreas	2004	PS2, WIN, XB, OSX, iOS, DROID, XB360, PS3, PS4, PS5, XBO, XBX/S, NS	Rockstar North	
Grand Theft Auto: The Ballad of Gay Tony	2009	XB360, WIN, PS3	Rockstar North	
Grand Theft Auto: The Trilogy – The Definitive Edition	2021	WIN, PS4, PS5, XBO, XBX/S, NS, iOS, DROID	Grove Street Games	
Grand Theft Auto: Vice City	2002	PS2, WIN, XB, OSX, iOS, DROID, PS4, PS5, XBO, XBX/S, NS	Rockstar North	
Grand Theft Auto: Vice City Stories	2006	PSP, PS2	Rockstar Leeds, Rockstar North	
Gun	2005	WIN, PS2, XB, GCN, XB360, PSP	Neversoft	
Gundam Seed: Rengou vs. Z.A.F.T.	2005	Arcade, PS2, PSP	Capcom	
Gungage	1999	PS1	Konami	
Gungrave	2002	PS2	Red Entertainment	
Gungrave G.O.R.E	2022	WIN, PS4, PS5, XBO, XBX/S, NS	Studio IGGYMOB	
Gungrave: Overdose	2004	PS2	Ikusabune	
Guns and Robots	2014	WIN	Masthead Studios	
Gunslinger Stratos	2012	Arcade	Byking, Taito	
Gunslinger Stratos 2	2013	Arcade	Byking, Taito	
GunValkyrie	2002	XB	Smilebit	
GunZ: The Duel	2006	WIN	MAIET Entertainment	
Heavy Metal: F.A.K.K. 2	2000	LIN, MAC, WIN	Ritual Entertainment	
Helldivers 2	2024	WIN, PS5	Arrowhead Game Studios	
Heretic II	1998	AMI, LIN, MAC, WIN	Raven Software	
Hitman	2016	WIN, PS4, XBO, LIN, OSX	IO Interactive	
Hitman 2	2018	WIN, PS4, XBO	IO Interactive	
Hitman 2: Silent Assassin	2002	WIN, PS2, XB, GCN	IO Interactive	
Hitman 3	2021	WIN, PS4, PS5, XBO, XBX/S, NS	IO Interactive	
Hitman: Absolution	2012	WIN, PS3, PS4, XB360, XBO, OSX	IO Interactive	
Hitman: Blood Money	2006	WIN, PS2, PS3, PS4, XB, XB360, XBO, iOS, DROID, NS	IO Interactive	
Hitman: Codename 47	2000	WIN	IO Interactive	
Hitman: Contracts	2004	WIN, PS2, XB	IO Interactive	
Hybrid	2012	XB360	5TH Cell	
Hydrophobia	2010	XB360, WIN, PS3	Dark Energy Digital	
Immortal: Unchained	2018	WIN, PS4, XBO	Toadman Interactive	
Infected	2005	PSP	Planet Moon Studios	
Infernal	2007	WIN, XB360	Metropolis Software	
Inversion	2012	WIN, PS3, XB360	Saber Interactive	
Iron Man	2008	PS3, XB360, PS2, PSP, DS, Wii, WIN	Secret Level, Artificial Mind and Movement	
Jak II	2003	PS2, PS3, PSV	Naughty Dog	
Jak 3	2004	PS2, PS3, PSV	Naughty Dog	
James Bond 007: Blood Stone	2010	WIN, PS3, XB360, DS	Bizarre Creations	
James Bond 007: Everything or Nothing	2004	GCN, PS2, XB	EA Redwood Shores, EA Tiburon, EA Canada	
James Bond 007: From Russia with Love	2005	GCN, PS2, PSP, XB	EA Redwood Shores	
Jet Force Gemini	1999	N64	Rare	
JJ	1987	NES	Square	
Just Cause	2006	PS2, XB360, XB, WIN	Avalanche Studios	
Just Cause 2	2010	PS3, XB360, WIN	Avalanche Studios	
Just Cause 3	2015	WIN, PS4, XBO	Avalanche Studios	
Just Cause 4	2018	WIN, PS4, XBO	Avalanche Studios	
Kane & Lynch 2: Dog Days	2010	WIN, PS3, XB360	IO Interactive	
Kane & Lynch: Dead Men	2007	WIN, PS3, XB360	IO Interactive	
Kid Icarus: Uprising	2012	3DS	Project Sora	
Kill Switch	2003	PS2, XB, WIN, GBA	Namco Hometek, Visual Impact	
The Last of Us	2013	PS3, PS4, PS5, WIN	Naughty Dog	
The Last of Us Part II	2020	PS4, PS5, WIN	Naughty Dog	
Last Survivor	1989	Arcade, FMT	Sega	
Left Alive	2019	WIN, PS4	Ilinx	
Loadout	2014	WIN, PS4	Edge of Reality	
Lost Planet 2	2010	PS3, XB360, WIN	Capcom	
Lost Planet 3	2013	WIN, PS3, XB360	Spark Unlimited	
Lost Planet: Extreme Condition	2006	XB360, WIN, PS3	Capcom	
Love & Destroy	1999	PS1	Inti Creates	
Made Man	2006	WIN, PS2	SilverBack Studios	
Mafia	2002	WIN, PS2, XB	Illusion Softworks	
Mafia II	2010	WIN, PS3, XB360, OSX, PS4, XBO	2K Czech	
Mafia III	2016	WIN, PS4, XBO, OSX	Hangar 13	
Mafia: Definitive Edition	2020	WIN, PS4, XBO	Hangar 13	
Mafia: The Old Country	2025	WIN, PS5, XBX/S	Hangar 13	
Marvel Rivals	2024	PS5, WIN, XBX/S	NetEase Games	
Marvel's Guardians of the Galaxy	2021	WIN, PS4, PS5, XBO, XBX/S, NS	Eidos-Montréal	
Mass Effect	2007	XB360, WIN, PS3, PS4, XBO	BioWare	
Mass Effect 2	2010	WIN, XB360, PS3, PS4, XBO	BioWare	
Mass Effect 3	2012	WIN, PS3, XB360, WiiU, PS4, XBO	BioWare	
Mass Effect: Andromeda	2017	WIN, PS4, XBO	BioWare	
The Matrix: Path of Neo	2005	PS2, WIN, XB	Shiny Entertainment	
Max Payne	2001	WIN, PS2, XB, OSX, iOS, DROID, PS4	Remedy Entertainment	
Max Payne 2: The Fall of Max Payne	2003	WIN, PS2, XB	Remedy Entertainment	
Max Payne 3	2012	WIN, PS3, XB360, OSX	Rockstar Games	
MDK	1997	DOS, PS1, WIN, MAC	Shiny Entertainment	
MDK2	2000	DC, PS2, WIN	BioWare	
Mega Man Legends	1997	PS1, N64, WIN, PSP	Capcom Production Studio 2	
Mercenaries 2: World in Flames	2008	WIN, PS2, PS3, XB360	Pandemic Studios	
Mercenaries: Playground of Destruction	2005	PS2, XB	Pandemic Studios	
Messiah	2000	WIN	Shiny Entertainment	
Metal Arms: Glitch in the System	2003	GCN, PS2, XB	Swingin' Ape Studios	
Metal Gear Solid 4: Guns of the Patriots	2008	PS3	Kojima Productions	
Metal Gear Solid V: The Phantom Pain	2015	WIN, PS3, PS4, XB360, XBO	Konami Digital Entertainment Co.	
Metal Gear Solid: Peace Walker	2010	PSP, PS3, XB360	Konami Digital Entertainment Co.	
Metal Slug	2006	PS2	SNK Playmore	
Metal Wolf Chaos	2004	XB, WIN, PS4, XBO	FromSoftware	
Miami Vice: The Game	2006	PSP	Rebellion Developments	
MindJack	2011	PS3, XB360	Feelplus	
MindsEye	2025	WIN, PS5, XBX/S	Build a Rocket Boy	
Mission: Impossible	1998	PS1, N64	Infogrames	
Mission: Impossible – Operation Surma	2003	GBA, GCN, PS2, XB	Paradigm Entertainment	
Mobile Suit Gundam Seed Destiny: Rengou vs. Z.A.F.T. II	2006	Arcade, PS2	Capcom	
Mobile Suit Gundam: Gundam vs. Zeta Gundam	2004	GCN, PS2	Capcom	
NAM-1975	1990	ARC, NEO, NEOCD, Wii	SNK	
Nanosaur	1998	MAC, WIN	Pangea Software	
NeverDead	2012	PS3, XB360	Rebellion Developments	
Oni	2001	WIN, MAC, PS2	Bungie West	
The Order: 1886	2015	PS4	Ready at Dawn	
Outcast: A New Beginning	2024	WIN, PS5, XBX/S	Appeal Studios	
Outcast: Second Contact	2017	WIN, PS4, XBO	Appeal	
The Outfit	2006	XB360	Relic Entertainment	
Outriders	2021	WIN, PS4, PS5, XBO, XBX/S	People Can Fly	
Outwars	1998	WIN	SingleTrac	
P.N.03	2003	GCN	Capcom Production Studio 4	
Palworld	2024	WIN, XBO, XBX/S, PS5	Pocketpair	
Paragon	2016	WIN, PS4	Epic Games	
Plants vs. Zombies: Battle for Neighborville	2019	WIN, PS4, XBO	PopCap Games	
Plants vs. Zombies: Garden Warfare	2014	PS3, PS4, XB360, XBO, WIN	PopCap Games	
Plants vs. Zombies: Garden Warfare 2	2016	WIN, PS4, XBO	PopCap Games	
Postal III	2011	WIN	Trashmasters, Running with Scissors	
Pragmata	2026	WIN, PS5, XBX/S, NS2	Capcom	
Project Eden	2001	PS2, WIN	Core Design	
Psi-Ops: The Mindgate Conspiracy	2004	PS2, WIN, XB	Midway Games	
PUBG: Battlegrounds	2017	WIN, iOS, DROID, XBO, PS4, PS5, XBX/S	PUBG Studios	
The Punisher	2005	PS2, WIN, XB	Volition	
Quantum Break	2016	WIN, XBO	Remedy Entertainment	
Quantum Theory	2010	PS3, XB360	Team Tachyon	
Radar Scope	1979	ARC	Nintendo	
Ratchet & Clank	2016	PS4	Insomniac Games	
Ratchet & Clank	2002	PS2	Insomniac Games	
Ratchet & Clank Future: A Crack in Time	2009	PS3	Insomniac Games	
Ratchet & Clank Future: Quest for Booty	2008	PS3	Insomniac Games	
Ratchet & Clank Future: Tools of Destruction	2007	PS3	Insomniac Games	
Ratchet & Clank: All 4 One	2011	PS3	Insomniac Games	
Ratchet & Clank: Going Commando	2003	PS2	Insomniac Games	
Ratchet & Clank: Into the Nexus	2013	PS3	Insomniac Games	
Ratchet & Clank: Rift Apart	2021	PS5, WIN	Insomniac Games	
Ratchet & Clank: Size Matters	2007	PSP, PS2	High Impact Games	
Ratchet & Clank: Up Your Arsenal	2004	PS2	Insomniac Games	
Ratchet: Deadlocked	2005	PS2, PS3	Insomniac Games	
Re-Mission	2006	WIN	Realtime Associates	
ReCore	2016	WIN, XBO	Armature Studio, Comcept	
Red Dead Redemption	2010	PS3, XB360, PS4, NS, WIN, PS5, XBX/S, NS2, iOS, DROID	Rockstar San Diego	
Red Dead Redemption 2	2018	PS4, XBO, WIN	Rockstar Games	
Red Dead Revolver	2004	PS2, XB, PS4	Rockstar San Diego	
Red Faction: Armageddon	2011	PS3, WIN, XB360	Volition	
Red Faction: Guerrilla	2009	PS3, XB360, WIN, PS4, XBO, NS	Volition	
Remnant 2	2023	WIN, PS5, XBX/S	Gunfire Games	
Remnant: From the Ashes	2019	WIN, PS4, XBO, NS	Gunfire Games	
Renegade X	2014	WIN	Totem Arts	
Reservoir Dogs	2006	PS2, WIN, XB	Volatile Games	
Resident Evil 2	2019	PS4, WIN, XBO, PS5, XBX/S, NS, iOS, OSX	Capcom	
Resident Evil 3	2020	PS4, WIN, XBO, PS5, XBX/S, NS	Capcom	
Resident Evil 4	2023	WIN, PS4, PS5, XBX/S, OSX, iOS	Capcom	
Resident Evil 4	2005	DROID, GCN, iOS, NS, PS2, PS3, PS4, Wii, WIN, XB360, XBO	Capcom Production Studio 4	
Resident Evil 5	2009	NS, PS3, PS4, WIN, XB360, XBO	Capcom	
Resident Evil 6	2012	NS, PS3, PS4, WIN, XB360, XBO	Capcom	
Resident Evil Village	2021	PS4, WIN, XBO, PS5, XBX/S, NS, OSX, iOS	Capcom	
Resident Evil: Operation Raccoon City	2012	WIN, PS3, XB360	Slant Six Games, Capcom	
Resident Evil: Revelations	2012	3DS, WIN, PS3, XB360, WiiU, PS4, XBO, NS	Capcom	
Resident Evil: Revelations 2	2015	WIN, PS3, PS4, XB360, XBO, NS, PSV	Capcom	
Resistance: Retribution	2009	PSP, PS4, PS5	Bend Studio	
Returnal	2021	PS5, WIN	Housemarque	
Ride to Hell: Retribution	2013	WIN, PS3, XB360	Eutechnyx	
Rise of the Tomb Raider	2015	XB360, XBO, WIN, PS4, OSX, LIN, NS2	Crystal Dynamics	
Risk of Rain 2	2020	WIN, PS4, XBO, NS, PS5, XBX/S	Hopoo Games	
Robert Ludlum's The Bourne Conspiracy	2008	PS3, XB360	High Moon Studios	
Rogue Company	2020	WIN, XBO, PS4, NS, PS5, XBX/S	First Watch Games	
Rogue Trooper	2006	PS2, Wii, WIN, XB, PS4, XBO, NS	Rebellion Developments	
Run Like Hell	2002	PS2, XB	Digital Mayhem	
S4 League	2008	WIN	Game On Studio Pentavision (formerly)	
The Saboteur	2009	PS3, WIN, XB360	Pandemic Studios	
Saints Row	2006	XB360	Volition	
Saints Row	2022	WIN, PS4, PS5, XBO, XBX/S	Volition	
Saints Row 2	2008	PS3, XB360, WIN, LIN	Volition	
Saints Row IV	2013	PS3, WIN, XB360, PS4, XBO, NS	Volition	
Saints Row: The Third	2011	PS3, WIN, XB360, LIN, NS, PS4, XBO, PS5, XBX/S	Volition	
Scarface: The World Is Yours	2006	WIN, PS2, XB, Wii	Radical Entertainment	
Scars Above	2023	WIN, PS4, PS5, XBO, XBX/S	Mad Head Games	
Scourge: Outbreak	2013	XB360, WIN, OSX, PS3	Tragnarion Studios	
Second Sight	2004	PS2, XB, GCN, WIN	Free Radical Design	
Shadow of the Tomb Raider	2018	WIN, PS4, XBO, OSX, LIN	Eidos-Montréal	
Shadow the Hedgehog	2005	GCN, PS2, XB	SEGA Studio USA	
Shadows of the Damned	2011	PS3, XB360, WIN, PS4, PS5, XBO, XBX/S, NS	Grasshopper Manufacture	
Shellshock: Nam '67	2004	WIN, PS2, XB	Guerrilla Games	
The Shield	2007	PS2, WIN	Point of View	
Slave Zero	1999	DC, WIN	Infogrames North America	
Sleeping Dogs	2012	WIN, PS3, XB360, PS4, XBO, OSX	United Front Games	
Sniper Elite	2005	WIN, PS2, XB, Wii, OSX	Rebellion Developments	
Sniper Elite 4	2017	WIN, PS4, XBO, NS, iOS, OSX	Rebellion Developments	
Sniper Elite 5	2022	WIN, PS4, PS5, XBO, XBX/S	Rebellion Developments	
Sniper Elite III	2014	WIN, PS3, PS4, XB360, XBO, NS	Rebellion Developments	
Sniper Elite V2	2012	WIN, PS3, XB360, WiiU, PS4, XBO, NS	Rebellion Developments	
Sniper Elite: Resistance	2025	WIN, PS4, PS5, XBO, XBX/S	Rebellion Developments	
SOCOM 3 U.S. Navy SEALs	2005	PS2	Zipper Interactive	
SOCOM 4 U.S. Navy SEALs	2011	PS3	Zipper Interactive	
SOCOM II U.S. Navy SEALs	2003	PS2	Zipper Interactive	
SOCOM U.S. Navy SEALs	2002	PS2	Zipper Interactive	
SOCOM U.S. Navy SEALs: Combined Assault	2006	PS2	Zipper Interactive	
SOCOM U.S. Navy SEALs: Confrontation	2008	PS3	Slant Six Games	
SOCOM U.S. Navy SEALs: Fireteam Bravo	2005	PSP	Zipper Interactive	
SOCOM U.S. Navy SEALs: Fireteam Bravo 2	2006	PSP	Zipper Interactive	
SOCOM U.S. Navy SEALs: Fireteam Bravo 3	2010	PSP	Slant Six Games	
SOCOM U.S. Navy SEALs: Tactical Strike	2007	PSP	Slant Six Games	
Soukou Kihei Votoms	2007	PS2	Yuke's	
Soukou Kihei Votoms: The Battling Road	1993	SNES	Sunrise	
Soukou Kihei Votoms: Uuodo Kummen Hen	1998	PS1	Takara	
SoulTrap	1996	WIN	Microforum International	
Space Bunnies Must Die!	1998	WIN	Jinx	
Space Harrier	1985	ARC	Sega	
Space Raiders	2002	GCN, PS2	Taito	
Spacewar!	1962	PDP1	Steve Russell	
Spec Ops: Covert Assault	2001	PS1	Runecraft	
Spec Ops: The Line	2012	WIN, PS3, XB360, OSX, LIN	Yager Development	
Splatoon	2015	WiiU	Nintendo EAD	
Splatoon 2	2017	NS	Nintendo EPD	
Splatoon 3	2022	NS	Nintendo EPD	
Splatoon Raiders	2026	NS2	Nintendo EPD	
SpyHunter: Nowhere to Run	2006	PS2, XB, WIN	Terminal Reality	
Star Trek	2013	WIN, PS3, XB360	Digital Extremes	
Star Trek: Deep Space Nine: The Fallen	2000	MAC, WIN	The Collective	
Star Wars Battlefront	2015	WIN, PS4, XBO	DICE	
Star Wars Battlefront II	2017	WIN, PS4, XBO	DICE	
Star Wars Battlefront: Renegade Squadron	2007	PSP	Rebellion Developments	
Star Wars: Battlefront	2004	PS2, WIN, XB, OSX, MOBI, PS4, PS5, XBO, XBX/S, NS	Pandemic Studios	
Star Wars: Battlefront II	2005	PS2, PSP, WIN, XB, PS4, PS5, XBO, XBX/S, NS	Pandemic Studios	
Star Wars: Bounty Hunter	2002	PS2, GCN, WIN, PS4, PS5, XBO, XBX/S, NS	LucasArts	
Star Wars: Hunters	2024	NS, iOS, DROID	Zynga, NaturalMotion	
Star Wars: Lethal Alliance	2006	DS, PSP	Ubisoft Montreal	
Star Wars: Outlaws	2024	WIN, PS5, XBX/S, NS2	Massive Entertainment	
Star Wars: Shadows of the Empire	1996	N64, WIN	LucasArts	
Starhawk	2012	PS3	LightBox Interactive	
Stranglehold	2007	WIN, XB360, PS3	Midway Studios Chicago, Tiger Hill Entertainment	
The Suffering	2004	PS2, WIN, XB	Surreal Software	
The Suffering: Ties That Bind	2005	PS2, WIN, XB	Surreal Software	
Sunset Overdrive	2014	XBO, WIN	Insomniac Games	
Syphon Filter	1999	PS1, PS4, PS5	Eidetic	
Syphon Filter 2	2000	PS1, PS4, PS5	Eidetic	
Syphon Filter 3	2001	PS1, PS4, PS5	Sony Bend	
Syphon Filter: Dark Mirror	2006	PSP, PS2, PS4, PS5	Bend Studio	
Syphon Filter: Logan's Shadow	2007	PSP, PS2, PS4, PS5	Bend Studio	
Syphon Filter: The Omega Strain	2004	PS2	Sony Bend	
Take No Prisoners	1997	WIN	Raven Software	
Tempest	1981	ARC	Atari	
Terminator Salvation	2009	iOS, PS3, WIN, XB360	Grin	
The Thing	2002	PS2, WIN, XB, PS4, PS5, XBO, XBX/S, NS	Computer Artworks	
Tom Clancy's Ghost Recon 2	2004	PS2, XB, GCN	Red Storm Entertainment	
Tom Clancy's Ghost Recon Advanced Warfighter	2006	PS2, XB360, XB	Ubisoft Paris, Red Storm Entertainment	
Tom Clancy's Ghost Recon Advanced Warfighter 2	2007	PS3, PSP, XB360	Ubisoft Paris, Red Storm Entertainment	
Tom Clancy's Ghost Recon Breakpoint	2019	WIN, PS4, XBO	Ubisoft Paris	
Tom Clancy's Ghost Recon Phantoms	2014	WIN	Ubisoft Singapore	
Tom Clancy's Ghost Recon Predator	2010	PSP	Virtuos	
Tom Clancy's Ghost Recon Wildlands	2017	WIN, PS4, XBO	Ubisoft Paris, Ubisoft Milan	
Tom Clancy's Ghost Recon: Future Soldier	2012	WIN, PS3, XB360	Red Storm Entertainment, Ubisoft Paris, Ubisoft Bucharest	
Tom Clancy's Splinter Cell	2002	XB, WIN, PS2, GCN, OSX, PS3	Ubisoft Montreal	
Tom Clancy's Splinter Cell: Blacklist	2013	WIN, PS3, XB360, WiiU	Ubisoft Toronto	
Tom Clancy's Splinter Cell: Chaos Theory	2005	WIN, PS2, XB, GCN, NGE, DS, 3DS, PS3	Ubisoft Montreal, Ubisoft Milan	
Tom Clancy's Splinter Cell: Conviction	2010	WIN, XB360, iOS, DROID, OSX	Ubisoft Montreal	
Tom Clancy's Splinter Cell: Double Agent	2006	XB360, PS2, XB, GCN, WIN, Wii, PS3	Ubisoft Milan, Ubisoft Shanghai	
Tom Clancy's Splinter Cell: Pandora Tomorrow	2004	XB, WIN, PS2, GCN, PS3	Ubisoft Milan, Ubisoft Shanghai	
Tom Clancy's The Division	2016	WIN, PS4, XBO	Massive Entertainment	
Tom Clancy's The Division 2	2019	WIN, PS4, XBO	Massive Entertainment	
Tomb Raider	1996	PS1, SAT, DOS, NGE, iOS, WIN, PS4, PS5, XBO, XBX/S, NS	Core Design	
Tomb Raider	2013	WIN, PS3, XB360, OSX, PS4, XBO, LIN, NS, NS2, iOS, DROID	Crystal Dynamics	
Tomb Raider: Anniversary	2007	WIN, PS2, PSP, XB360, Wii, OSX, PS3, PS4, PS5	Crystal Dynamics, Buzz Monkey Software	
Tomb Raider: Legend	2006	WIN, PS2, XB, XB360, PSP, DS, GCN, PS3, PS4, PS5	Crystal Dynamics	
Tomb Raider: Underworld	2008	WIN, PS3, XB360, Wii, MOBI, PS2, OSX	Crystal Dynamics	
Total Overdose	2005	PS2, WIN, XB	Deadline Games	
Transformers: Dark of the Moon	2011	PS3, XB360, 3DS, Wii, DS, iOS	High Moon Studios	
Transformers: Fall of Cybertron	2012	WIN, PS3, XB360, PS4, XBO	High Moon Studios	
Transformers: War for Cybertron	2010	WIN, PS3, XB360	High Moon Studios	
Trigger Man	2004	PS2, XB, GCN	Point of View	
True Crime: New York City	2005	PS2, XB, GCN, WIN	Luxoflux	
True Crime: Streets of LA	2003	PS2, XB, GCN, WIN, OSX	Luxoflux	
Uncharted 2: Among Thieves	2009	PS3, PS4	Naughty Dog	
Uncharted 3: Drake's Deception	2011	PS3, PS4	Naughty Dog	
Uncharted 4: A Thief's End	2016	PS4, PS5, WIN	Naughty Dog	
Uncharted: Drake's Fortune	2007	PS3, PS4	Naughty Dog	
Uncharted: Golden Abyss	2011	PSV	Bend Studio	
Uncharted: The Lost Legacy	2017	PS4, PS5, WIN	Naughty Dog	
Unit 13	2012	PSV	Zipper Interactive	
Unreal Championship 2: The Liandri Conflict	2005	XB	Epic Games	
Vanquish	2010	PS3, PS4, WIN, XB360, XBO	PlatinumGames	
Virus: It is Aware	1999	PS1	Cryo Interactive	
Wanted: Dead	2023	WIN, PS4, PS5, XBO, XBX/S	Soleil	
Wanted: Weapons of Fate	2008	MOBI, WIN, PS3, XB360	Grin	
Warframe	2013	WIN, PS4, XBO, NS, PS5, XBX/S, iOS	Digital Extremes	
Warhammer 40,000: Space Marine	2011	WIN, PS3, XB360	Relic Entertainment	
Warhammer 40,000: Space Marine II	2024	WIN, PS5, XBX/S	Saber St. Petersburg	
Warhawk	2007	PS3	Incognito Entertainment	
Watch Dogs	2014	WIN, PS3, PS4, XB360, XBO, WiiU	Ubisoft Montreal	
Watch Dogs 2	2016	WIN, PS4, XBO	Ubisoft Montreal	
Watch Dogs: Legion	2020	WIN, PS4, XBO, PS5, XBX/S	Ubisoft Toronto	
Waterworld	1995	VBOY	Ocean Software	
Wet	2009	PS3, XB360	Artificial Mind & Movement	
Wheelman	2009	WIN, PS3, XB360	Tigon Studios, Midway Studios – Newcastle	
Wild Guns	1994	SNES, Wii	Natsume	
WinBack	1999	N64, PS2	Omega Force	
WinBack 2: Project Poseidon	2006	PS2, XB	Cavia	
Without Warning	2005	PS2, XB	Circle Studio	
World War Z	2019	WIN, PS4, XBO, NS, PS5, XBX/S	Saber Interactive	
X-COM: Enforcer	2001	WIN	Infogrames Interactive Hunt Valley Studio	
Xybots	1987	ARC	Atari Games	
Zombie Army Trilogy	2015	WIN, PS4, XBO, NS	Rebellion Developments	

== See also ==
- Third-person shooter
- List of first-person shooters
