= Apocalyptica (disambiguation) =

Apocalyptica is a Finnish cello metal trio, known for their unusual music style and some famous compositions.

Apocalyptica may also refer to:

- Apocalyptica (album) the 2005 album by the group of the same name
- Apocalyptica (video game) is a computer game developed by Extreme FX and published by Konami in 2003

== See also ==
- Apocalyptic (disambiguation)
