= Syphon Filter (video game) =

1999 video game

- North American box art
- Developer: Eidetic
- Publishers: NA: 989 Studios; EU: Sony Computer Entertainment
- Designer: Richard Ham
- Programmer: Christopher Reese
- Artist: John Garvin
- Writers: John Garvin; Richard Ham
- Composer: Chuck Doud
- Series: Syphon Filter
- Platform: PlayStation
- Release: NA: February 16, 1999; EU: July 9, 1999
- Genre: Third-person shooter
- Mode: Single-player

Syphon Filter is a 1999 third-person shooter video game developed by Eidetic and published by Sony Computer Entertainment for the PlayStation. 989 Studios released the game in North America. It is the first installment in the Syphon Filter franchise. The plot centers on special agents Gabriel "Gabe" Logan and Lian Xing who are tasked by the United States government to apprehend a German international terrorist.

Development on Syphon Filter began with the intention of creating a new "super-spy" genre hybrid that contained elements of stealth-action and puzzle solving. The game was almost cancelled several times during development as Eidetic faced many difficulties due to their inexperience in creating video games. Despite the initial setbacks faced, Syphon Filter was met with critical acclaim upon release, with most praise directed at its innovative gameplay and immersive plot.

== Gameplay ==
A still image from the first level of the game. The interface displays Logan's armour, ammunition count and radar.

The game is presented in a third-person perspective, and the player can freely move in three-dimensional space and rotate the camera in any direction. The top left corner of the screen interface shows the status of Logan's armour, a 'danger-meter' which rises as the player engages enemies through combat, and a target lock. A radar is displayed in the bottom left corner of the screen which shows the location of various objects including friendly units, enemies, weapon pick ups or mission objectives. The current weapon equipped is always displayed in the bottom right corner, with the ammunition count. Depending on the weapon used, the camera will shift to first-person mode to assist in aiming.

The core of the gameplay is focused on action which involves Logan navigating through levels whilst shooting enemies. The game takes place in a variety of locations, including narrow interior streets of Washington D.C. to wide open plains of Kazakhstan. In some stealth based missions, the game has various puzzles. Some locations feature low light ambience, which force the player to use their flashlight despite its drawbacks imposed during stealth missions.

== Plot ==
In 1999, Gabriel Logan and his partner Lian Xing investigate a series of biological outbreaks triggered by international terrorist group Black Baton whose commander is Erich Rhoemer. When fellow agent Ellis loses contact during a mission in Costa Rica, the top-secret Agency dispatches Gabe and Lian to find him. They discover Ellis is dead, and Rhoemer's suspected drug operation is a cover for the viral operation. Another outbreak in Nepal leads to more questions when an infected person who should have perished somehow survived.

Before the Agency can pursue Rhoemer, he assaults Washington, D.C. and threatens to detonate viral bombs scattered across the city. Gabe battles several terrorists, including Mara Aramov, as he follows the trail of bombs across city streets, subways, the National Mall and finally Freedom Memorial where he incinerates munitions expert Anton Girdeux to stop the final threat. Gabe's investigation takes him to a new lead from PharCom, a multinational pharmaceutical and biotechnology corporation headed by Jonathan Phagan. The Costa Rican plantation was growing PharCom compounds, meaning Phagan and Rhoemer were cooperating. At the PharCom Exposition Centre, Gabe shadows Phagan to a meeting with Aramov and Edward Benton, an apparent Agency turncoat who assisted Rhoemer during the Washington, D.C. attack.

After Gabe eliminates Benton, he saves Phagan from assassination only to have him escape. Mara Aramov, now in custody, had attempted to locate PharCom's virus labs. Gabe must set aside the hunt for Phagan to destroy Rhoemer's base in Kazakhstan. During his assignment, Rhoemer seemingly kills Lian, but Agency Director Thomas Markinson rescues Gabe. Markinson gives Gabe a report on the virus called Syphon Filter, a bioweapon that one can program on a genetic level to target specific groups of people. Markinson orders Gabe to infiltrate Rhoemer's stronghold in Ukraine to inject test subjects with a vaccine, assassinate the scientists working there, and locate Phagan, who is now Rhoemer's prisoner. In the catacombs, Phagan tells Gabe that Lian is alive, and they reunite. Lian has become infected with Syphon Filter, and she says there is no universal cure.

Mara Aramov arrives to shoot Phagan, but she convinces Gabe and Lian that she came to help. The three travel to PharCom's warehouses in hopes of preventing Rhoemer from launching a missile. Lian reveals that the serum Gabe injected into the test subjects was in fact a lethal chemical, and Markinson was having them killed. Using the fighting between Rhoemer's terrorists and Phagan's security personnel to cover his insertion, Gabe descends into a silo and searches for the missile's detonation codes.

He finds Markinson, who admits that the Agency was in fact working with Black Baton all along. Rhoemer worked for Markinson, since the latter wanted the virus in the Agency's possession. He never permitted the missile attack, but before he can stop it, Rhoemer kills Markinson with a headshot. Gabe races to the missile's control centre in time and destroy it. Enraged, Rhoemer engages Gabe in a final fight, but is killed with a gas grenade.

Their mission completed, Gabe and Lian call in the U.S. Army Chemical and Biological Defense Command (CBDC) to secure the area. Lian asks her partner how far Markinson was in cahoots with Rhoemer and Phagan, but Gabe believes that they may never know. In a post-credits scene, Aramov approaches a mysterious man inside the Agency headquarters and whispers something in his ear. He congratulates her while the camera pulls back to show PharCom boxes in the office.

== Development ==
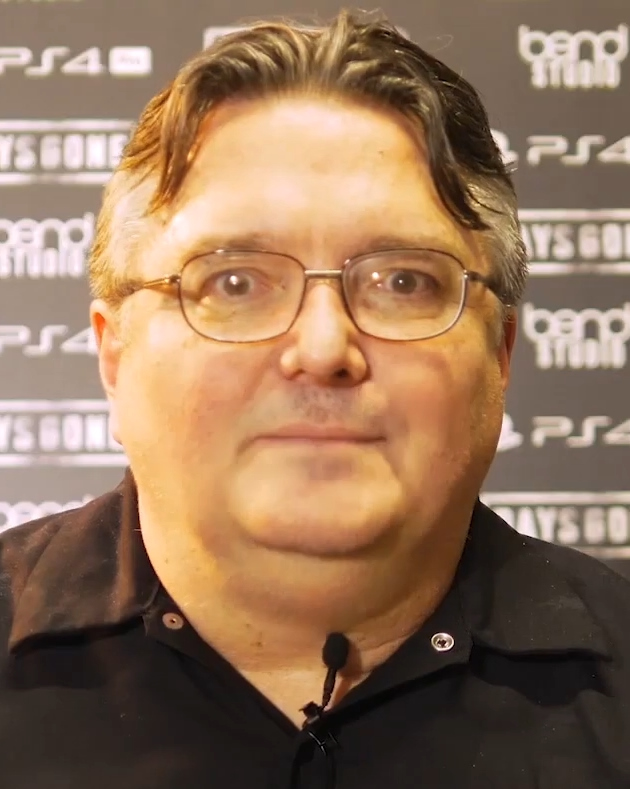
Creative director John Garvin in 2019

According to creative director John Garvin, Syphon Filter was originally conceived as "just a name" from a producer at 989 Studios. Initially, there was no plot, character or gameplay from the original one-page synopsis. According to the team's lead designer Richard Ham, his original concept was a cinematic action game inspired by action cinema, especially John Woo films. Eidetic decided to give the game a third-person perspective and focus heavily on weapons, gadgets and stealth. The popular E3 1997 trailer for Metal Gear Solid disheartened Ham due to striking similarities with the project they were working on, so they decided to offer a "radically different" experience with Syphon Filter. He was particularly influenced by Rare's successful GoldenEye 007, released for the Nintendo 64 later that year, and implemented the game's mechanics to have a similar feel for a new "super spy" genre.

The team experienced immense difficulty in creating the game, as Garvin noted that there were "no, or few, games" from which Eidetic could draw inspiration. Most of the team that developed Syphon Filter had little experience with making third-person action games, as Eidetic's only video game released for a console was Bubsy 3D, which was released three years prior for the PlayStation and was infamous for being critically panned as one of the worst games of all time. Despite the initial difficulties with staff and lack of experience, Eidetic produced a prototype which involved a shooting segment in a subway. Garvin admitted that the team "didn't know anything about making realistic shooters set in a spy world" as the game came close to being cancelled several times throughout development because the team was missing deadlines, revamping mechanics and changing the story. During development, the team of thirteen re-wrote several drafts as the game was being conceived. The original plot of Syphon Filter was intended as a science-fiction orientated approach and involved a group of kidnapped scientists who were being forced to build a time machine by an unspecified antagonistic organization. The storyline was radically changed when Garvin was hired to be art director, later creative director. The game was released for PlayStation in North America on February 16, 1999, and in Europe on July 16 by 989's parent company Sony Computer Entertainment, as 989 Studios did not operate outside North America.

Syphon Filter was re-released on the PlayStation 4 and PlayStation 5 in 2022, with Trophy support added to the game.

== Reception ==
Reception

Aggregate score
Aggregator	Score
Metacritic	90/100

Review scores
Publication	Score
AllGame	4.5/5
CNET Gamecenter	8/10
Edge	6/10
Electronic Gaming Monthly	7.625/10
Eurogamer	(PSN) 8/10
Famitsu	31/40
Game Informer	9/10
GameFan	94% (Note: Three critics of GameFan gave the game each a score of 97, 92, and 94.)
GamePro	5/5 (Note: GamePro gave the game three 5/5 scores for graphics, control, and overall fun factor, and 4.5/5 for sound.)
GameRevolution	B+
GameSpot	9/10
IGN	(PS) 9.5/10 (PSN) 6.5/10
Next Generation	4/5
Official U.S. PlayStation Magazine	4/5

Syphon Filter received "universal acclaim" according to the review aggregation website Metacritic. In Japan, where the game was ported and published by Spike on August 12, 1999, Famitsu gave it a score of 31 out of 40.

Edge was positive to the game despite feeling that it borrowed elements from both GoldenEye 007 and Metal Gear Solid, and they also noted that the game's execution could have been better. The blend of a stealth-action hybrid gameplay was praised by most critics. Douglass C. Perry of IGN enjoyed the implemented skill-based action that he considered was "hard to come by in a PlayStation game". Perry praised the game's detail and advanced graphics, but criticised the low resolution and acknowledged the game's imperfect frame rate.

GameRevolution similarly praised the attention to detail, calling every texture of the game well planned and rendered. However, they claimed that the graphics were not as good as Metal Gear Solid. They also noted that during some points the game "suffers from many typical PlayStation polygonal errors", causing some textures to become "warped" when viewed from an angle, although they noted that glitches were uncommon and did not affect gameplay in any way.

The gameplay and artificial intelligence were the most praised aspects of the game. GameRevolution noted the gameplay was "well above average" and had an excellent replay value, in contrast to games such as Star Fox 64 once completed. Perry praised the game's wide variety of weapons and gadgets, having counted at least thirty different weapons and equipment for the player to use, with the added bonus of secret weapons, adding to the gameplay value. GameRevolution added that the AI was the best part of the game, commending on how certain enemies react when one of their comrades is killed nearby. IGN similarly praised its AI, pointing out on how every time a level is played the AI would change its behaviour, sometimes hiding behind trees or carrying different weapons.

A reviewer from Next Generation praised its unique gameplay and satisfying plot, opining that both contained "some genuinely exciting moments" and labelled it as one of the first quality action games of the year.

The game sold more than 900,000 units.

At the 3rd Annual Interactive Achievement Awards, the Academy of Interactive Arts & Sciences named Syphon Filter as a finalist for "Console Action Game of the Year" and "Outstanding Achievement in Game Design".

== Sequels ==
Due to its popularity, Sony commissioned 989 Studios to make various sequels to the game. Syphon Filter 2 was released in 2000 to popular reviews from critics, and another direct sequel, Syphon Filter 3, was released in 2001 to mixed reviews upon release. A fourth title, Syphon Filter: The Omega Strain, was released in 2004 for PlayStation 2 to mixed reviews. Two titles were released for the PlayStation Portable in 2006 and 2007; Syphon Filter: Dark Mirror and Syphon Filter: Logan's Shadow, respectively. A port to the PlayStation 2 for Logan's Shadow was released in North America in 2010. Those were met with mixed to positive reviews from critics.
