= Slant Six =

Slant-6, Slant 6, or Slant Six may refer to:

- Chrysler Slant-6 automobile engine
- Slant 6, a punk-rock band from Washington, D.C.
- Slant Six Games, a video-game developer from Vancouver, BC
