= Days Gone =

2019 video game

- Developer: Bend Studio
- Publisher: Sony Interactive Entertainment
- Directors: John Garvin; Jeff Ross
- Producer: Darren Yager
- Designer: Ron Allen
- Programmer: John Hoffman
- Artist: Donald Yatomi
- Writer: John Garvin
- Composer: Nathan Whitehead
- Engine: Unreal Engine 4
- Platforms: PlayStation 4; Windows; PlayStation 5
- Release: PlayStation 4; April 26, 2019; Windows; May 18, 2021; PlayStation 5; April 25, 2025
- Genre: Action-adventure
- Mode: Single-player

Days Gone is a 2019 action-adventure video game developed by Bend Studio and published by Sony Interactive Entertainment. It is set in post-apocalyptic Oregon two years after the start of a pandemic that turned a portion of humanity into vicious zombie-like creatures. Former outlaw biker Deacon St. John discovers his wife Sarah, having been assumed dead, may still be alive and goes on a quest to find her. The game is played from a third-person perspective in which the player can explore an open world environment. Players can use firearms, melee weapons, and improvised weapons, and can use stealth to defend themselves against enemies. A major game mechanic is Deacon's motorcycle, which is used as the player character's main mode of transportation. The enemies, known as "Freakers" in the game, can congregate to form a large horde to chase down Deacon.

Days Gone was Bend Studio's first open-world project, its first original property since Syphon Filter (1999), and its first development project for home consoles after spending decades working on spinoff games for handheld consoles. The game's development took approximately six years; Bend Studio expanded nearly three-fold to support it. Central Oregon was chosen as the game's setting due to its diverse terrain and landscapes. The game's storytelling method was inspired by several shows on Netflix, while the narrative was inspired by World War Z, The Walking Dead and Sons of Anarchy. The game was unveiled at E3 2016; its release was originally planned for 2018 but was delayed several times.

The game was released for the PlayStation 4 in April 2019, and Windows in May 2021. A remastered version for PlayStation 5 was released in April 2025 alongside a downloadable content pack with the new game modes for Windows. Upon release, Days Gone received mixed reviews from critics, who criticized the game's mission design and technical issues but praised the graphics, artificial intelligence, and Sam Witwer's performance as Deacon, while the story received a mixed reception. The game had sold 7.32 million units by February 2022. In 2021, it was reported that the development team had unsuccessfully pitched a sequel to Sony. A film adaptation is currently in development.

== Gameplay ==
In this gameplay screenshot, protagonist Deacon is being chased by a horde of Freakers.

Days Gone is a third-person action-adventure game set in a post-apocalyptic open world. The player controls Deacon St. John, an outlaw-turned-drifter-bounty-hunter who prefers life on the road to wilderness encampments. The game takes place two years after a pandemic killed almost all of humanity and transformed millions of others into "Freakers", mindless, zombie-like creatures. They hibernate during daytime but often congregate, wander around, and search for food and water at night. Players can lure them toward other enemies, causing the two groups to fight one another. Other enemies include Newts, who are infected adolescents and opportunistic hunters who only attack Deacon when he enters their territory or has poor health, as well as infected wildlife (called Runners and Ragers) and hostile human enemies. Players are easily overwhelmed by hordes and must keep their distance. Deacon can use firearms, melee weapons, traps, explosives and choke points to kill Freakers.

Players can complete objectives in multiple ways, such as by using stealth tactics to distract enemies or silently kill them from behind using a combat knife. Noise suppressors can be attached to various firearms to prevent attracting nearby enemies. Deacon can use "survival vision", which, once activated, highlights items of interest and the locations of nearby enemies. Players can use Deacon's binoculars to locate enemies. Alternatively, players have access to a wide variety of firearms such as pistols, shotguns, sniper rifles, submachine guns and crossbows. Different weapons have different statistics and higher-tier weapons are generally more powerful. Purchased weapons can be stored in a gun locker, though weapons that are picked up in the field cannot be put into storage. Players can use explosives such as proximity mines and grenades, and may craft molotov cocktails to defeat enemies. Melee weapons can be used but they will break if not repaired regularly.

Players can freely explore the game's open world on foot or using a motorcycle. The bike consumes fuel and becomes disabled if excessively damaged. Players must regularly refuel the bike at gas stations and camps, and repair it using collected scraps. Deacon must establish trust with settlement camps and earn "camp credits" by completing missions and selling food. As the level of trust increases, players can purchase new weapons, supplies and motorcycle parts that can be used to enhance its speed, durability and maneuverability. Valuable resources and components can also be collected for crafting weapons and supplies. The game has a number of side objectives, which include clearing Freaker nests, rescuing hostages, clearing enemy camps, capturing bounty targets, and restoring power to National Emergency Response Organization (NERO) checkpoints. Inside NERO checkpoints, players can use NERO injectors to boost Deacon's health; stamina, used for sprinting or dodging; and focus, which allows Deacon to temporarily slow down time while aiming his ranged weapons. Fast travel consumes fuel and causes time to pass. Before players can fast travel, they must destroy all Freaker nests between the two fast travel points. As players complete missions and objectives, they gain skill points (XP). With sufficient XP, players can level up and unlock new abilities, allowing them to increase the efficiency of Deacon's melee weapons and ranged weapons, and enhance his survival skills.

== Plot ==
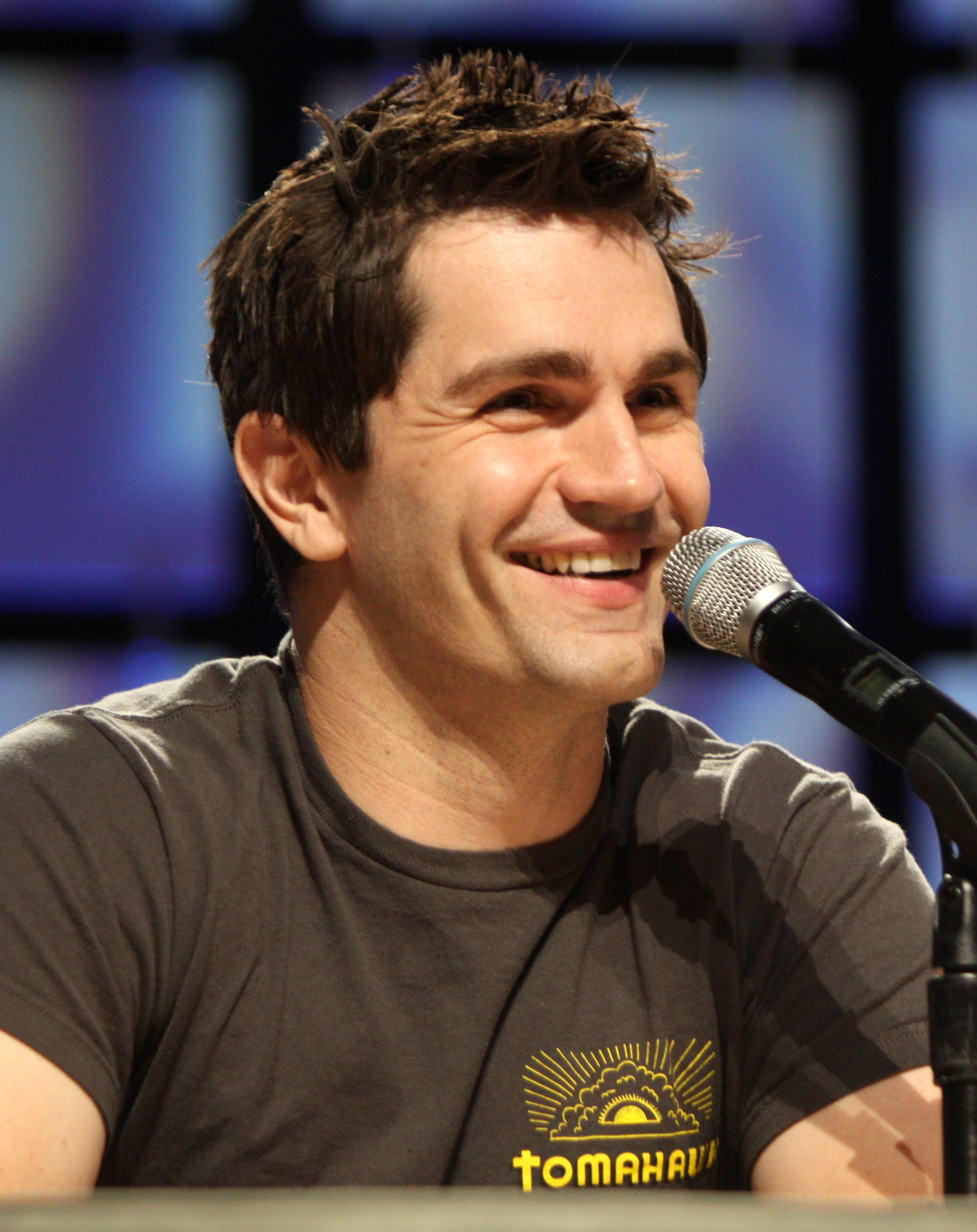
Sam Witwer provided the voice and motion capture for Deacon St. John in Days Gone.

A virus has decimated the globe, turning a large portion of humanity into violently feral creatures called Freakers. In Oregon, outlaw bikers Deacon St. John (Sam Witwer) and William "Boozer" Gray (Jim Pirri), alongside Deacon's wife Sarah Whitaker (Courtnee Draper), attempt to flee to safety. They find a NERO (National Emergency Response Organization) helicopter. While Sarah boards the helicopter, Boozer is injured so Deacon stays behind to help him after promising to reunite with his wife.

Two years later, Deacon and Boozer are working in the Pacific Northwest as mercenaries. Sarah is assumed dead after the NERO refugee camp she was traveling to was overrun. The two men plan to head north in search of a better life, but they are attacked by a gang of cultists, the Rippers. Boozer's arm is burned in the attack, so Deacon searches for medical supplies to help him recover. Deacon sees a NERO helicopter and follows it, eventually meeting James O'Brian (Bernardo de Paula), the researcher who evacuated Sarah two years earlier. O'Brian reveals that Sarah's helicopter was diverted to a different camp mid-flight, leaving the possibility that she is still alive.

While running errands for Ada Tucker (Dee Dee Rescher), the leader of the Hot Springs camp, Deacon finds Lisa Jackson (Laura Bailey & Alexa Rose), a teenage girl and returns her to Tucker. Lisa later flees the Hot Spring after being subjected to forced labor and is captured and tortured by the Rippers, forcing Deacon to rescue her. Unwilling to send Lisa back to the Hot Springs, Deacon arranges for her to shelter with Rikki Patil (Nishi Munshi), a former drifter and member of the Lost Lake camp led by "Iron" Mike Wilcox (Eric Allan Kramer) and Raymond "Skizzo" Sarkozi (Jason Spisak), the former of which parted on bad terms with Deacon.

Boozer's condition worsens and, in an act of desperation, Deacon sneaks into Lost Lake to steal medical supplies but is caught. Despite the bad blood, Deacon is able to convince Iron Mike to allow Boozer to stay and later learns that Lisa fled from the camp and remains missing. As a doctor amputates Boozer's gangrenous arm, O'Brian contacts Deacon and offers to help him find Sarah if Deacon aids him in NERO's ongoing research project. Skizzo is distrustful of the Rippers' uneasy alliance with Lost Lake; he makes his own deal and turns Deacon over to the cult. Deacon discovers that the Rippers' leader "Carlos" is actually Jessie Williamson (Scott Whyte), a former member of Deacon and Boozer's MC who blames the pair for his excommunication. Discovered and freed by Lisa, who has since joined the Rippers, Deacon escapes from the Rippers' camp and returns to Lost Lake only to find it under attack by the Rippers. Deacon exposes Skizzo's betrayal to Iron Mike, and Iron Mike talks down Jessie, ending the attack. With Boozer's help, Deacon uses explosives to destroy the dam above the Rippers' camp, flooding the compound and drowning most of the Rippers while Deacon kills Jessie in single combat. After Deacon returns, Iron Mike reveals he released Skizzo to spare his life.

Deacon realizes that Sarah, a government researcher with federal security clearance, would have been prioritized during a camp evacuation, and O'Brian confirms that she was moved to a military outpost at Crater Lake, which is now controlled by the Deschutes County Militia. Deacon meets Derrick Kouri (Phil Morris), a Captain for the militia, and is brought back to the Crater Lake outpost. Deacon then wins over the militia's leader, Colonel Matthew Garret (Daniel Riordan), and reunites with Sarah, who is working to create a bio-weapon to destroy the Freakers. Deacon and Sarah decide to obtain a DNA sequencer at her old lab, where they discover that her research was used to develop the Freaker virus.

Back at Crater Lake, Sarah reveals that she is working to cure the Freakers rather than destroy them. Deacon suggests they finish the cure, but an increasingly paranoid Garret puts Sarah into protective custody. Garret, shown over time to be a religious fanatic, declares a holy war against all other camps. Deacon attempts to save Sarah but is caught and apprehended by Skizzo, who has joined the militia and lies that Deacon was banished from their last camp. Although Garret orders his execution, Deacon is spared and released by a sympathetic Kouri, who defects from the militia. Returning to Lost Lake just in time to assist in the defense against the militia's attack, Deacon finds a mortally wounded Iron Mike, who dies shortly after. Deacon rallies the remaining members of the Lost Lake camp and retaliates against the militia by attacking their headquarters with a truck bomb. Deacon kills Skizzo and Sarah poisons Garret, ending the militia. Deacon, Sarah, Boozer, and their friends settle at Lost Lake, while Lisa is revealed to have become a drifter collecting Freaker bounties.

Sometime later, O'Brian contacts Deacon for a face-to-face meeting and reveals that NERO always knew about the virus's mutagenic effects and that O'Brian himself is a Freaker, mutated but still in control of his thoughts and actions. He warns Deacon that NERO is coming and that nothing will stop them.

== Development ==
Days Gone was developed by Bend Studio, one of Sony's first-party developers. The game's core development team included studio director Christopher Reese, game director Jeff Ross, and creative director John Garvin, all of whom had worked at Bend Studio since the 1990s, when it was creating Syphon Filter. Days Gone is the company's first open world game, its first original intellectual property since Syphon Filter (1999), and its first game to be released for home consoles since Syphon Filter: Logan's Shadow (2007). Full production of Days Gone commenced in early 2015 and the game's development cycle lasted for six years. Bend Studio significantly expanded and the development team increased from around 50 to 130. The game's development was completed on March 10, 2019, and Bend Studio confirmed it had been declared gold, indicating the game was being prepared for duplication and release.

During the game's pre-production, the team decided it would be an open world project. The game is set in Central Oregon, where Bend Studio is located. According to Garvin, Central Oregon has diverse terrain and landscapes ranging from snowy mountains to deserts, making it an ideal setting for a sandbox title. According to lead designer Eric Jensen, the open world mechanics of Days Gone were designed by a small team of five or six developers who "had to think smart and efficient with all of our design choices knowing the manpower limitations". The studio initially underestimated the manpower needed to develop the project, thinking a team of 50 people would suffice. While the game is open world, most of the game's missions are scripted and connected to its main story. The team's goal was to replicate the successes of linear games such as the Uncharted series in an open world setting.

The developers were inspired by World War Z, The Walking Dead and Sons of Anarchy, which were popular at the beginning of the game's development. While the enemies featured in the game are similar to zombies, Bend Studio named them "Freakers". The Swarmers in the game were inspired by "a guy who was doing a YouTube video where he was moving weird", while the Newts were inspired by the movements of contortionists. Swarmers may congregate to form a horde of 50 to 500. To better optimize the horde, Swarmers are divided into small clusters. If they are close to the player, some of these horde clusters will split off from the main group, making them easier for players to manage. In a large horde, there are eight Swarmer character models; the team modified the height of each one to make their appearance and behaviors unique. The team spent a lot of time working on the group artificial intelligence (AI) to ensure the horde would not only charge at Deacon in a straight line but would also make use of the terrain to overwhelm the player character.

Days Gone has multiple, intertwined stories, which allows players to switch between narratives. The team wanted to keep the narrative interesting and fresh. The game constantly keeps track of player's progress, with the team being inspired by Netflix's menu. The game initially allowed Deacon to make decisions that can change the narrative; this feature was removed from the final game because the team had difficulty showing players the impacts of these decisions. According to Garvin, by removing these narrative choices, Deacon's personality would be better reflected because some of these choices may allow him to commit cruel actions that do not fit his personality. According to Garvin, the game's main theme is "redemption". The journey would see Deacon, who is often seen as an outsider, grow and evolve into a capable leader. Garvin added that despite the game's post-apocalyptic setting, the team aimed to deliver a more hopeful theme because the story of Deacon concerns the way he can make the world a better place and explores the idea that surviving is not the same as living. The game's story and themes were inspired by The Road, The Passage and I Am Legend. Because Deacon is a member of a motorcycle club, the team researched the biker gang Mongols Motorcycle Club.

Garvin, who was impressed by his work on The Purge: Anarchy, invited Nathan Whitehead to compose the music for Days Gone, which was performed by the Nashville Scoring Orchestra and soloists. Whitehead spent two years working on the game's soundtrack. The instrumentation is centered around guitar, which Whitehead said was an "obvious choice" for both the character of Deacon—a bounty hunter and biker—and for the Pacific Northwest setting. Whitehead added that the game's music, which combines "folk Americana and a touch of rock elements", is a good fit for the setting. To accommodate the video game medium's interactivity, the score for Days Gone was built up in layers that the game engine could add or remove. As a result, the score dynamically changes in accordance with the gameplay. The final soundtrack features songs by Lewis Capaldi, Jack Savoretti, Billy Raffoul and Zander Reese.

== Release ==
Publisher Sony Interactive Entertainment unveiled Days Gone at E3 2016. While the game was originally planned for a 2018 release, it was delayed to the following year. The release was postponed from February 22, 2019, to April 26 in the same year to avoid competing with other triple-A titles such as Metro: Exodus and Anthem. As part of Sony's efforts to bring more of its first-party content to personal computers following Horizon Zero Dawn, Days Gone released for Windows via Steam and Epic Games Store on May 18, 2021 and via GOG on October 25, 2023.

Upon release, Bend Studio supported the game with free downloadable content. In June 2019, Survival difficulty mode, which modifies the head-up display and disables options to fast travel, was introduced. This was followed by 12 weekly challenges, in each of which players' performances are classified into Gold, Silver and Bronze rankings. Players receive gameplay perks as well as credits that can be used to purchase new characters and other accessories. In September 2019, Bend added New Game Plus and the MB-150, a sniper rifle from the Syphon Filter series, into the game. Bike tanks, decorations, and frame paint inspired by Death Stranding were released in November 2019.

On February 12, 2025, Sony announced that a remastered version of Days Gone, exclusive to the PlayStation 5, would release on April 25, 2025. In addition to introducing various graphical improvements and accessibility features, the remastered version of the game also added a permadeath mode and a speedrun mode, as well as "Horde Assault", which tasks players to survive endless waves of Freakers for as long as possible. The three new modes were also released for Windows as part of the Broken Roads downloadable content pack.

== Reception ==
=== Critical reception ===
Reception

Aggregate scores
Aggregator	Score
Metacritic	PS5: 78/100 PS4: 71/100; PC: 76/100
OpenCritic	DG: 54% (recommend); DG Remastered: 75% (recommend)

Review scores
Publication	Score
Destructoid	6/10
Game Informer	7.75/10
GamePro	82/100
GameRevolution	8/10
GameSpot	5/10
GamesRadar+	3.5/5
Hardcore Gamer	4/5
IGN	6.5/10
Jeuxvideo.com	15/20
PC Gamer (US)	63/100
PlayStation: The Official Magazine	9/10
Push Square	8.1/10
Shacknews	7/10
VentureBeat	75/100
VG247	3/5
VideoGamer.com	8/10

Days Gone received "mixed or average" reviews from critics for the PS4 version, and "generally favorable" reviews for the PC version, according to review aggregator website Metacritic. Days Gone Remastered for PS5 also received "generally favorable" reviews according to Metacritic. According to OpenCritic, 54% of critics recommended the original game, while 75% of critics recommended the remastered version.

The game's open world and design received mixed reviews. Matthew Kato from Game Informer was disappointed by the lack of content in the world; he said most side objectives were filler content that was neither engaging nor interesting. This sentiment was shared by Eurogamer's Malindy Hetfeld, who said in Days Gone, players are "doing the exact same thing, in the exact same way, for hours on end." Leon Hurley from GamesRadar said the open world design is fairly unoriginal despite being entertaining. Shacknews's Bill Lavoy liked the way the game remembers the player's actions through its systems. For instance, once players clear out a horde, it does not respawn, and the area becomes safer. Lavoy, however, noted the small scale of the map and criticized the way Days Gone uses environmental obstacles to force players to navigate longer distances. Several reviewers felt that the world is empty and sparse because the game's locations were not given a strong visual identity or backstory, making exploration meaningless.

Defeating a horde was often singled out as one of the game's highlights. Kato described the experience as "terrifying" and "tense", and applauded the artificial intelligence for being unpredictable, meaning that different trials may lead to vastly different outcomes. Kallie Plagge from GameSpot liked fighting the horde, calling it "exhilarating" and "satisfying," though she criticized several campaign missions that tasked the players to clear these hordes in a nearly back-to-back manner, making the experience exhausting. Stealth mechanics were commonly criticized by reviewers for being too basic and boring. Dean Takahashi disliked the clunkiness of the shooting mechanics, since the game lacked an option to shoot backward while being chased by Freakers. Both Takahashi and Hurley liked the progression system, and remarked that Deacon gradually became more powerful in the game. The motorcycle, which was the only way to navigate the world, received mixed opinions, with Hurley adding that he slowly grew attached to Deacon's bike because the game required the player to care for it during the campaign. However, the need to refuel the bike discouraged some reviewers from exploring the game's world, and some regarded it as a major source of tedium. Many reviewers were not impressed by the Freakers because of their similarity to zombies.

The story received mixed reviews. Writing for VentureBeat, Takahashi said the story is engaging but that he was disappointed that some storylines were not completely resolved by the end of the game. Lavoy said the story and some of its elements were too long. Some critics said the story gradually became more interesting as more characters and more emotional moments were introduced. Andrew Webster from The Verge called the story bland. Hetfield criticized the interwoven storylines, which he said distracted players from completing the central mission. Narrative missions were also criticized for lacking impact, consequences and any form of meaningful conclusion. O'Brien was unimpressed by the game's overly serious tone. While she liked the supporting characters, she said the antagonists were one-dimensional. Deacon as a protagonist received mixed reactions; Takahashi described him as an "interesting and flawed character," and enjoyed seeing Deacon grow and evolve. Plagge was critical of Deacon as a character, calling him "selfish" and adding that the story is centered around "validating his actions and feelings above all else." Webster disliked Deacon's personality and said he found connecting with the character very difficult. Witwer's performance was generally praised by critics.

The game was criticized for its technical issues. Kato said the game lacks the polish found in Sony's other first-party games. Takahashi criticized the game's bugs and unstable frame rate. The game's frequent loading screens, which appear between gameplay and cutscenes, were also criticized.

=== Sales ===
Days Gone was the best-selling physical game in the United Kingdom in the week of release. It went on to be the best-selling software release in all the format sales charts for three consecutive weeks. In Japan, Days Gone outsold two other PlayStation 4-exclusive games at launch, God of War and Horizon Zero Dawn. Days Gone exceeded the lifetime Japanese sales of God of War and The Last Guardian, another exclusive PlayStation 4 game. In the first three days after its launch, Days Gone sold approximately 114,319 physical units.

In North America, Days Gone was the second-best-selling video game for April 2019, behind Mortal Kombat 11, making it the seventh-highest debut in sales for a Sony-published title, and the best-selling game developed by Bend Studio. By June 2019, Days Gone was the eighth-best-selling video game of the year. It was the 19th-best-selling game of 2019 in the US. According to game director Jeff Ross, Days Gone sold more units than all of Bend Studio's previous games combined.

In January 2022, Days Gone's director Jeff Ross claimed on Twitter that the game had sold over 8 million units by late 2020. However, this stat was disputed by several gaming outlets. The sales numbers provided by Ross were disputed as they were based on a PlayStation Trophy data tracking site. Ross went on to say that whilst at Bend Studio he saw Days Gone sell over five million copies, the tracking site at the time suggested 5.8 million copies sold. In December 2023, a ransomware attack targeted at Insomniac Games caused the leak of Sony's private data. From this leak, it was revealed that by February 2022, Days Gone had sold 7.32 million units.

=== Awards ===
Year	Award	Category	Result	Ref.
2016	Golden Joystick Awards	Most Wanted Game	Nominated	
2017	Game Critics Awards	Best Action/Adventure Game	Nominated	
2018	Game Critics Awards	Best Original Game	Nominated	
2018	Gamers' Choice Awards	Most Anticipated Game	Nominated	
2019	The Independent Game Developers' Association Awards	Best Audio Design	Nominated	
2019	The Independent Game Developers' Association Awards	Best Visual Design	Won	
2019	Golden Joystick Awards	Best Storytelling	Won	
2019	Golden Joystick Awards	Best Audio	Nominated	
2019	Golden Joystick Awards	PlayStation Game of the Year	Won	
2019	Hollywood Music in Media Awards	Original Score - Video Game	Nominated	
2019	Hollywood Music in Media Awards	Original Song - Video Game ("Hell or High Water")	Nominated	
2019	Hollywood Music in Media Awards	Outstanding Music Supervision – Video Game (Keith Leary, Peter Scaturro and Alex Hackford)	Won	
2019	Titanium Awards	Best Spanish Performance (Claudio Serrano)	Won	
2020	23rd Annual D.I.C.E. Awards	Outstanding Achievement in Animation	Nominated	
2020	NAVGTR Awards	Animation, Technical	Nominated	
2020	NAVGTR Awards	Graphics, Technical	Nominated	
2020	NAVGTR Awards	Original Dramatic Score, New IP	Nominated	
2020	NAVGTR Awards	Song, Original or Adapted ("Days Gone Quiet")	Nominated	
2020	NAVGTR Awards	Sound Editing in a Game Cinema	Nominated	
2020	NAVGTR Awards	Sound Effects	Nominated	
2020	NAVGTR Awards	Use of Sound, New IP	Nominated	
2020	G.A.N.G. Awards	Best Original Song ("Days Gone Quiet")	Nominated	
2020	Webby Awards	Best Music/Sound Design	Won	
2020	ASCAP Composers' Choice Awards	Video Game Score of the Year	Nominated	

== Possible sequel ==
On April 9, 2021, Jason Schreier of Bloomberg News revealed Bend Studio had pitched a sequel to Days Gone but that the first game's mixed critical reception and lengthy development process caused Sony to reject the proposal. Shortly afterward, Ross confirmed Days Gone 2 had been pitched to Sony but that many of the details could not be confirmed due to a non-disclosure agreement. He revealed that part of the plan for the sequel was a "shared universe with co-op play," which was not included in the original Days Gone due to staffing constraints.

While appearing on a podcast with David Jaffe, the creator of the God of War franchise, Garvin said, "If you love a game, buy it at fucking full price," and implied Days Gone did not receive a sequel partly because it did not turn enough profit. Garvin came under fire for his remarks; commenters said Days Gone had already benefitted from fan support during its release, and that it was unreasonable to ask someone to spend US$70 on an unknown game. Others noted that Sony ultimately controls sales of PlayStation games and offers free demos, and the blame could not be placed entirely on the purchasers. Following Garvin's comments, Jensen thanked players for their support, no matter when they had purchased or played it.

According to David Jaffe, Shawn Layden, then chairman of SIE Worldwide Studios, had vigorously supported Days Gone. But as soon as Layden left his role in September 2019, Jaffe said "Days Gone was dead" and claimed that when trying to pitch a sequel "it was just an uphill battle the whole time" and Ross stated that Sony requested if other intellectual properties could be used instead. Ross said the sequel would have explored a more technical direction among detailing other features.

== Film adaptation ==
In August 2022, Deadline reported that, at the time, a film adaptation of the game was in the works with PlayStation Productions and Vendetta Productions producing the film and Sam Heughan was in consideration to play the role of Deacon St. John.
