= Syphon Filter 2 =

2000 video game

- North American box art
- Developer: Eidetic
- Publishers: NA: 989 Studios; EU: Sony Computer Entertainment
- Designer: Richard Ham
- Programmer: Christopher Reese
- Artist: John Garvin
- Writers: John Garvin; Richard Ham
- Composer: Chuck Doud
- Series: Syphon Filter
- Platform: PlayStation
- Release: NA: March 14, 2000; EU: July 20, 2000
- Genre: Third-person shooter
- Modes: Single-player, multiplayer

Syphon Filter 2 is a 2000 third-person shooter video game developed by Eidetic and published by Sony Computer Entertainment for the PlayStation. It is the second installment in the Syphon Filter franchise and a sequel to 1999 Syphon Filter. It is the last game in the series to be released by 989 Studios in North America. In 2022, it was added to the premium collection for PlayStation Plus.

== Gameplay ==
Syphon Filter 2 added multiplayer which features some characters to select from (including deceased characters from Syphon Filter), as well as new maps not found in single player mode.

== Plot ==
Hours after the events of the first game, Gabriel Logan and Lian Xing are enemies of the state to the Agency after uncovering its connection to Syphon Filter, labeled as terrorists to the general public. Agency operative Dillon Morgan captures Lian at the PharCom warehouses, forcing Gabe and the CBDC soldiers to rendezvous with ex-Agency operative Teresa Lipan in Arizona. Simultaneously, the Agency scrambles a squadron of F-22 Raptors to intercept their transport over the Colorado Rockies, so Gabe and CBDC Lieutenant Jason Chance head down the mountain in search of their plane and a box of PharCom data disks. Agency operative Steven Archer attempts to stop them at all costs.

A group of conspirators, including Mara Aramov and Agency director Lyle Stevens, make a deal to deliver the virus to a rogue Chinese general named Shi-Hao. Meanwhile, Lian recovers in a U.S. Air Force base where Morgan, Derek Falkan, and Thomas Holman are working with Dr. Elsa Weissinger of PharCom to extract infected plasma from test subjects. Lian learns that the other subject was PharCom CEO Jonathan Phagan, who survived his gunshot wound long enough for the Agency to take the plasma. Weissinger protests that Phagan is useful and should be kept alive for further research, but Morgan, not intending that the U.S. government find PharCom's CEO infected with an unknown virus, deactivates his life support, tying up a loose end.

Lian escapes the medical building and interrogates Holman to learn that Morgan is planning another operation to the PharCom Expo Center to find an encryption disk. She leaves the base in a helicopter after killing Falkan and teams up with Gabe to battle Archer's forces. Gabe kills Archer during his escape, and recovers the PharCom data.

The protagonists follow Holman's lead to the Expo Center and kill Morgan before he can recover the disk he sought. After decrypting the PharCom data, Teresa realises that some information is missing. The other half is with Russian SVR Director, Uri Gregorov, who appeared at the warehouses before Gabe left. Since Lian and Uri know each other, they agree to meet in Moscow.

Aramov instigates a gunfight while they meet and Lian pursues Gregorov. Lian later learns he is an impostor working for Mara and trying to find the other half of the data. The man admits that the real Gregorov is in a Russian gulag, Aljir Prison, which once held Lian captive. Gregorov uncovered a plot to sell the virus to Shi-Hao, so Aramov intervened. Lian stops Gregorov's execution, but is almost killed by the virus and collapses. Gabe takes her back to the States, while Gregorov promises to handle Shi-Hao.

Gabe and Teresa arrive back at the Virginia safehouse overseen by Lawrence Mujari, a freelance pathologist. They decide to trade the PharCom data to the Agency for Lian's vaccine. Director Stevens double-crosses Gabe in the Agency's New York City labs, but Logan escapes, downloads all of the Agency's information, and forces Dr. Weissinger to give him the vaccine. Gabe also finds out that Chance survived the mission in Colorado, and sets him free.

Pursued by NYPD SWAT cops and Agency personnel, Gabe hurries back to their helicopter. Along the way, Logan is forced to provide cover for a SWAT officer whose partner is wounded. He does so, but Stevens, who later takes the cop hostage, orders him to drop his weapons. Despite Logan complying in surrender, Stevens kills the officer anyway. Before he can get shot, Gabe is thrown into the sewers by an explosion that Teresa sets off. Gabe assumes that Chance was killed in the labs since Teresa says he never made it to the helicopter. Gabe and Teresa eventually corner Stevens and Gabe shoots him in cold blood.

Gabe and Teresa reach the helicopter to find Chance waiting in impenetrable Agency-issued body armor. He was really working for them, and he shoots Teresa. Gabe suspected it since the Agency always knew where he was in Colorado. Both men fight, and Gabe kills the man he trusted with an assault shotgun that drives Chance into the helicopter blades, decapitating him.

A news report reveals that the Agency's existence is now public, and U.S. Secretary of State Vincent Hadden promises that the government will investigate. Gabe cures Lian and demarcates a grave for Teresa. He, Lian, and Lawrence hold a small memorial and promise to keep fighting, while soldiers watch them from a distance. In a post-credits scene, Hadden and Aramov emerge from a helicopter, with Aramov saying that the Administration will soon fall allowing Hadden to become president. Although a team of soldiers requests for permission to kill Gabe and his team, Hadden calls off the operation, telling Mara he has other plans for Gabe. Aramov laughs as the screen fades to black.

== Development ==
John Garvin stated that, unlike development of the first game, he and co-creator Richard Ham had a complete vision of what the game would be like prior to the development process: "I think I spent a weekend and wrote the entire screenplay. Rich and I got together and he helped revise the second half of the game, introducing all the Moscow stuff, making the end of the story more espionage-like and exciting. When the [development team] came back, we spent the next year building exactly what we had written. That was the first time that we had a vision up front, which we followed until the end." Garvin has expressed pride in his inclusion of a diverse cast of characters, such as the American-Indian Teresa Lipan, African-American Lawrence Mujari and Chinese Lian Xing.

Syphon Filter 2 was added as a part of the premium collection for PlayStation Plus in 2022, with Trophy support added to the game. It is also the first PlayStation Plus Premium game with both 50 Hz and 60 Hz modes.

== Reception ==
Reception

Aggregate score
Aggregator	Score
GameRankings	81%

Review scores
Publication	Score
AllGame	4.5/5
CNET Gamecenter	5/10
Edge	7/10
Electronic Gaming Monthly	5.75/10 (Note: Two critics of Electronic Gaming Monthly gave the game each a score of 5.5/10, and two others gave it each a score of 6/10.)
EP Daily	9.5/10
Game Informer	9/10
GameFan	(G.H.) 98% 88% (Note: In GameFan's viewpoint of the game, three critics gave it each a score of 94, 88, and 83.)
GameRevolution	B+
GameSpot	6.6/10
IGN	8.9/10
Next Generation	4/5
Official U.S. PlayStation Magazine	3.5/5
The Cincinnati Enquirer	4/4

Syphon Filter 2 received favourable reviews according to the review aggregation website GameRankings.

Many reviewers stated that the game differed little from the original in terms of gameplay and graphics. GameRevolution concluded: "Fans of the original should aim for the head and pull the trigger – this one's a no-brainer." Douglass C. Perry of IGN praised the two-player mode and favourably compared it to similar features in Medal of Honor. Jeff Ludrigan of NextGen said, "If you don't mind a serious challenge, this game will reward your persistence with nail-biting action, excellent graphics, and a well told, memorable story." A less positive review came from Jeff Gerstmann of GameSpot, who wrote: "If you were a big fan of Syphon Filter, you may get a kick out of the sequel, but the lackluster mission design and super-convoluted story really cancel out the improvements to the game's control."

While most reviewers praised the game, the voice-acting was panned. Gerstmann stated: "Some of Gabe's lines and vocal inflection really don't fit the current situation, making it sound as if he were lounging by the pool instead of taking heavy fire from entrenched enemies." Perry called the voice acting "truly awful", while Patrick Klepek of Gaming Age called the voice acting "sub-par", continuing: "[...] the accents given to some of the characters are just terrible, though Gabe's voice is probably the worst offender of them all."

Air Hendrix of GamePro said in one review, "When the awesome gameplay, sharp controls, and everything else are added up, Syphon 2 [sic] is destined to be another huge hit. It's one of the PlayStation's best action games—with the PS2 on the horizon, it'll also rank highly among the last great PlayStation games." (Note: GamePro gave the game all perfect scores of 5/5 each for graphics, sound, control, and fun factor in one review.) In another review, The Freshman said that the game's difficulty "may turn off more casual gamers who dislike failing pinpoint twitch-action segments over and over and over, which is a pity, because Syphon 2's [sic] awesome storyline and tense action simply beg to be played. Patient gamers are in for a treat, but this virus might make you lose your hair." (Note: GamePro gave the game three 4/5 scores for graphics, control, and fun factor, and 4.5/5 for sound in another review.)

In a retrospective review, AllGame editor Rich Briggs highly praised Syphon Filter 2, referring to it as "a highly entertaining title filled with rock-solid gameplay and continuous action".

As of 2007, Syphon Filter 2 had sold 1.32 million units, earning platinum status.
