= SOCOM U.S. Navy SEALs: Fireteam Bravo 3 =

2010 video game

- Developer(s): Slant Six Games
- Publisher(s): Sony Computer Entertainment
- Series: SOCOM U.S. Navy SEALs
- Platform(s): PlayStation Portable
- Release: NA: February 16, 2010; AU: February 18, 2010; UK: February 19, 2010
- Genre(s): Third-person shooter
- Mode(s): Single-player, multiplayer

SOCOM U.S. Navy SEALs: Fireteam Bravo 3 is a 2010 tactical third-person shooter video game developed by Slant Six Games and published by Sony Computer Entertainment for the PlayStation Portable. It is a spin-off to the SOCOM U.S. Navy SEALs series and the sequel to SOCOM U.S. Navy SEALs: Fireteam Bravo 2. It features a new campaign and features like the all new online campaign co-op as well as online play supporting medals and ribbons and leaderboards. The title would also support the ability to unlock these weapons and gear. It also boasts team focused gameplay that will allow new ways for players to interact, expanding on the team orientated, authentic, military experience that the franchise is famous for as well as a compelling narrative story in a cutting edge presentation. The online multiplayer servers were shut down on August 31, 2012.

== Plot ==
The player assumes the role of Calvin "WRAITH" Hopper leading a team of Navy SEALs in a covert operation in a matter of national security to track down and interrogate former KGB agent, Vasyli Gozorov, who is believed to be withholding information on a forthcoming attack with weapons of mass destruction.

== Reception ==
SOCOM U.S. Navy SEALs: Fireteam Bravo 3 has generally received mixed to positive reviews. GameSpot stated that it is "Fairly easy, with little tactical depth", while IGN said that "the story was short, but the multiplayer kept it going."
