= SOCOM U.S. Navy SEALs: Tactical Strike =

2007 video game

- Developer: Slant Six Games
- Publisher: Sony Computer Entertainment
- Composer: Justin Burnett
- Series: SOCOM U.S. Navy SEALs
- Platform: PlayStation Portable
- Release: NA: November 6, 2007; EU: December 7, 2007; AU: February 28, 2008
- Genre: Real-time strategy
- Modes: Single-player, multiplayer

SOCOM U.S. Navy SEALs: Tactical Strike is a 2007 real-time strategy video game developed by Slant Six Games and published by Sony Computer Entertainment for the PlayStation Portable. It is a spin-off of the SOCOM U.S. Navy SEALs series.

The online servers for this game, along with other PlayStation 2 and PlayStation Portable SOCOM titles, were shut down on August 31, 2012.

== Gameplay ==
SOCOM U.S. Navy Seals: Tactical Strike focuses on the player being able to maintain tight control of a four-man special operations squad. The game represents a major departure from the third-person shooter gameplay of the previous SOCOM U.S. Navy SEALs games. In Tactical Strike, the player character commands the squad to perform actions. The player often has to evaluate a situation and plan accordingly, usually having to move with some stealth. The squad is moved around using a "skimmer" (the analog stick of the PSP); the player can preview where the individual members of the squad will move to before they opt to actually move the team. The squad can be controlled from the points of view of different soldiers; additionally, the four man-team can be split up into two teams of two. The player can even choose to select an individual member of the squad.

At the start of the campaign, the player chooses from one of nine special forces teams to command: the Australian SASR, the German KSK, the British SAS, the French GIGN, the U.S. Navy SEALs, the Spanish UOE, the South Korean 707th Special Missions Battalion, the Italian Col Moschin, or the Dutch KCT. Although the storyline of the campaign is the same for every team, the voice track is voiced by native speakers of the different languages (with English subtitles).

Before each mission, the player can choose the loadout and accessories for each individual, upgrade each soldier's attributes with skill points obtained from previous missions (skill points are awarded for killing enemies and completing objectives), and choose one of two places to insert into the mission (if applicable).

== Reception ==
Reception

Aggregate score
Aggregator	Score
Metacritic	72/100

SOCOM U.S. Navy SEALs: Tactical Strike received "mixed or average" reviews, according to review aggregator Metacritic.
