= Without Warning (video game) =

2005 video game

- Developer: Circle Studio
- Publisher: Capcom
- Engine: RenderWare
- Platforms: PlayStation 2, Xbox
- Release: EU: October 28, 2005; NA: November 1, 2005
- Genre: Third-person shooter
- Mode: Single player

Without Warning is a 2005 third-person shooter game developed by Circle Studio and published by Capcom for the PlayStation 2 and Xbox. Set in a vast chemical plant, during a brutal terrorist plot, the game follows the actions of the six playable characters; three Special Forces members, a security guard, a secretary, and a cameraman. Set over twelve hours, the feel of the game, storywise, is similar in style to the TV series 24.

Despite relatively high expectations during development, given the developers' previous work on the Tomb Raider series, Without Warning received generally negative reviews from critics, who criticised the plot, characters, poor AI and technical issues. The game turned out to be Circle Studio's only video game as the company transitioned to developing DVD games only after the game's poor reception, before closing down altogether in 2007.

== Gameplay ==
Gameplay of Without Warning varies depending on which character is being played. In the case of the Special Forces members and the security guard, gameplay is generally fast-paced, as is often the case with arcade-style shooters. While the game features a dedicated cover system, there is little emphasis on tactical combat, with the best approach often being simply to eliminate all enemies as quickly as possible. Despite the core gameplay of the four characters being largely alike, they all have small differences between them. These involve exclusive objectives for each character, making their gameplay differ slightly from each other. There are also minor differences between the weapons of each character, which in turn affects the gameplay of each as well.

The remaining two characters rely far more on stealth over action. The secretary has only the option to stun enemies either with pepper spray or a fire extinguisher, rather than killing them outright. This is often largely ineffective, and as such, generally the secretary must proceed throughout the chemical plant without alerting the terrorists. The gameplay for the cameraman is largely the same, although with this character, the player has the option to attempt to kill terrorists with a gun. A more notable difference, however, is that the cameraman is required to film various activities committed throughout the chemical plant by the terrorists using his camera, exposing himself to danger.

== Plot ==
The story begins with a Special Forces unit being briefed on a terrorist takeover of a chemical plant, led by a man known as Derbec. The Special Forces unit, consisting of veteran Kyle Rivers, rookie Jack Hooper, bomb expert Ed Reagan, and two others, soon prepares to infiltrate the plant. Elsewhere, news cameraman Ben Harrison begins to head to the chemical plant as well, via helicopter. Inside the plant, secretary Tanya Shaw and security guard Dave Wilson quickly comprehend the situation, both managing to evade the terrorists before they can kill them or take them as hostages. Upon reaching the chemical plant, the two minor Special Forces members are killed in a terrorist ambush, and the remaining three are separated from each other. They quickly continue forward through the plant.

Meanwhile, Dave soon finds a colleague and friend of his shot dead within the plant. Vowing revenge, he decides to eliminate the terrorists throughout the facility. Elsewhere, Tanya tries to sneak out of the chemical plant, successfully managing to reach a large courtyard. She signals to the helicopter carrying Ben, in hope of being rescued, but as it approaches her, it is shot down by a terrorist. It is, however, revealed that Ben has managed to survive the crash. More concerned about winning the Pulitzer prize as opposed to his own safety, Ben's obsession pushes him throughout the chemical plant, filming the activities of the terrorists with his camera, rather than trying to escape.

With the Special Forces unit soon discovering that numerous sections of the chemical plant are rigged to blow, Ed begins to defuse them, while Jack starts rewiring electrical boxes throughout the plant to allow the team access to all areas. Meanwhile, Kyle continues to try and regain control of the plant. Eventually, Ed succumbs to a bomb as he fails to defuse it in time. With the bomb expert dead, the task of defusing the bombs is given to Jack. Tanya eventually manages to escape the plant without harm, while elsewhere, as Dave continues to repel the terrorists, he is injured by a grenade. Unable to move, the terrorists are about to finish him off when Kyle reaches him and fends them off. Still wounded, Dave has no choice but to stay where he is as Kyle leaves him to continue through the plant.

Eventually, it is revealed that Derbec's reason for taking over the plant are simply about revenge, and that he had intended to blow up the plant from the beginning. With this new insight, Jack races against time to defuse the bombs before the terrorists finish planting them and detonate them, while Kyle continues to hunt down Derbec. With Ben satisfied with the footage he has collected, including footage showing Derbec's current whereabouts, he progresses to a computer in order to upload them to the Internet and show them to the world. Just as he is about confirm his upload, he is discovered by a terrorist, who subsequently holds him at gunpoint. Briefly considering his options, Ben soon opts to confirm his upload as opposed to surrendering, resulting in his death.

With Ben's footage now showing all over the world, Kyle heads over to where Derbec was reported to have been last seen, but is eventually injured in ambush. Unable to fight, he is approached by Derbec, who has come out of hiding now that the threat of Kyle is over. Kyle remains strong-willed against the terrorist leader, but Derbec soon shoots him in the head. Having disarmed the bomb threat, Jack decides to go after Derbec. Despite heavy resistance from what's left of Derbec's terrorists, he manages to eliminate them all and confront Derbec. Jack wins the ensuing gunfight, and with the terrorist threat finally over, Jack extracts himself and Dave out of the chemical plant, where aid is waiting for them outside.

== Reception ==
Reception

Aggregate score
Aggregator	Score	
Aggregator	PS2	Xbox
Metacritic	45/100	45/100

Review scores
Publication	Score	
Publication	PS2	Xbox
Edge	N/A	3/10
Electronic Gaming Monthly	3.67/10	3.67/10
Eurogamer	4/10	N/A
Game Informer	6.5/10	6.5/10
GameSpot	4.6/10	4.6/10
GameSpy	2.5/5	2.5/5
GameZone	N/A	4.5/10
IGN	4/10	4/10
Official U.S. PlayStation Magazine	2.5/5	N/A
Official Xbox Magazine (US)	N/A	1.5/10

The game received "generally unfavorable reviews" on both platforms according to video game review aggregator Metacritic. Edge magazine would describe it as "a work of stultifying incompetence that seems to hate its own players."
