= Circle Studio =

British video game developer

- Industry: Video games
- Founded: October 2003
- Founders: Jeremy Heath-Smith, Adrian Smith
- Defunct: February 2007
- Fate: Liquidation
- Headquarters: Derby, United Kingdom
- Website: Wayback Archive

Circle Studio was a video game developer located in Derby, United Kingdom.

The company was formed and staffed in October 2003 by a group of former employees at Core Design, a studio owned by Eidos Interactive. The founders of the new company, brothers Jeremy Heath-Smith and Adrian Smith, had a managerial role in the Tomb Raider series, which was Core Design's best known creation.

In 2005, Circle Studio finished working on a title called Without Warning, a third-person shooter for the PlayStation 2 and Xbox. It was published by Capcom. The game was generally poorly received, and after releasing it, Circle Studio transitioned to developing and publishing licensed DVD games, with distribution handled by Pinnacle Vision.

Despite having secured a 7-figure investment from the Royal Bank of Scotland in May 2006, the company was liquidated in February 2007.

== Games ==
=== Video games ===
- Without Warning (2005)

=== DVD games ===
- 2006 FIFA World Cup Trivia Challenge
- Blockbusters
- British Hit Singles and Albums
- Discovery Kids: Killers of the Wild
- Discovery Kids: Myths and Monsters
- Eurosport Total Sports Quiz
- NBA Challenge
- Madagascar: Animal Trivia DVD Game
- Now That's What I Call A Music Quiz
- The Price is Right
- Shrek: Totally Tangled Tales
