= Bend Studio =

American video game developer

- Logo used since 2022
- Formerly: Blank, Berlyn & Co., Inc. (1992–1995); Eidetic, Inc. (1995–2000)
- Type: Subsidiary
- Industry: Video games
- Founded: 1992; 34 years ago
- Founders: Marc Blank; Michael Berlyn
- Headquarters: Bend, Oregon, US
- Key people: Christopher Reese (studio director)
- Products: Bubsy 3D; Syphon Filter; Days Gone
- Number of employees: 150+ (2022)
- Parent: Sony Computer Entertainment (2000–2005); PlayStation Studios (2005–present)
- Website: bendstudio.com

Bend Studio (formerly Blank, Berlyn & Co., Inc. and Eidetic, Inc., also formerly known as SCEA Bend Studio) is an American video game developer based in Bend, Oregon. Founded in 1992, the studio is best known for developing Bubsy 3D, the Syphon Filter series, and Days Gone. Since 2000, Bend Studio is a first-party developer for Sony Interactive Entertainment under PlayStation Studios.

== History ==
Eidetic logo (1995–2000)

Bend Studio logo (2000–2022)

Marc Blank and Michael Berlyn founded Bend Studio as Blank, Berlyn & Co. in 1992. Blank had been a founder and the product development director for Infocom, while Berlyn, an author of adventure games, had previously worked at Infocom before moving to Accolade. Blank was approached by a California company after an employee had used Cornerstone, a software package by Infocom, and remembered that the company also developed games. That company was looking to release a "sound-oriented game machine for cars", for which Blank suggested a series of sports games that would sound like radio broadcasts. The project never went into production and Blank repurposed the idea for an American football video game with an ambiance resembling a TV broadcast. In 1992, he pitched the idea to Berlyn, wondering whether Accolade would be interested in such a title.

A few months after the 1993 release of Bubsy in Claws Encounters of the Furred Kind, when Berlyn was on hiatus at Accolade, they began developing games under the Blank, Berlyn & Co. name. Blank became the president of the new company. The company's first games were the puzzle video games Columbo's Mystery Capers and Dell Crossword Puzzles for the Apple Newton. Both were released in November 1993 by StarCore, Apple's publishing label for the Newton. Two further such games, Dell Crossword Puzzles and Other Word Games and Motile, followed by June 1994. According to Arnie Katz of Electronic Games, these releases proved Blank, Berlyn & Co. "tremendously successful". Thereafter, Russ Wetmore, the developer of Preppie! II, joined the developer after a seven-year tenure at Apple. They realized Blank's football game idea as Live Action Football using ScriptX, which allowed for a simultaneous release on Microsoft Windows and Macintosh System Software. Accolade published the game in November 1994 as the first in a series of sports games that Blank, Berlyn & Co. was to develop for the publisher. The next of these was to be a baseball game.

Following these releases, Blank, Berlyn & Co. looked to expand further, changing its name to Eidetic in April 1995 and recruiting technical director Christopher Reese. Under the new name, Eidetic developed Bubsy 3D with a team of approximately eight people. It was the studio's first console game and first 3D game; Reese described the transition to 3D as "difficult". Released in 1996 for the PlayStation, Bubsy 3D was unsuccessful, which Reese attributed to its competition with Crash Bandicoot. Thereafter, 989 Studios, a division of Sony Computer Entertainment (SCE), approached Eidetic with a one-page pitch for Syphon Filter, an action and stealth game. According to creative director John Garvin, who was hired during the game's development, SCE had had faith in Eidetic because it had experience in PlayStation development and already had an engine that the game could be built on. The development of Syphon Filter was difficult because Eidetic had no experience making a stealth-action game. The company expanded to thirteen people, while Berlyn left the company due to his dissatisfaction with the state of the video game industry and the nature of Syphon Filter. Due to missing deadlines and making changes to the game's structure, story and mechanics, Syphon Filter was almost canceled several times. Despite the difficulties, 989 Studios producer Connie Booth had great faith in the project. Syphon Filter was released in 1999 and sold over one million units.

Eidetic continued developing Syphon Filter games for SCE, creating six further until 2007, uninterrupted by any other release. SCE acquired the studio in 2000, renaming it to Bend Studio. Beyond the Syphon Filter series, Bend Studio wanted to develop games for a different franchise and decided to develop a Resistance game for the PlayStation Portable due to similarities between Resistance and Syphon Filter. Bend Studio create a demo for the game and showed it to SCE producers and the original Resistance developer, Insomniac Games, and was approved to begin development of Resistance: Retribution. After the game's 2009 release, Bend Studio dedicated nine employees to Uncharted: Golden Abyss for the PlayStation Vita. After several ideas for the project were rejected by franchise developer Naughty Dog, the developer ultimately agreed to Bend Studio's vision and had the project approved. Bend Studio worked closely with Naughty Dog and was allowed to use all assets from Uncharted: Drake's Fortune and Uncharted 2: Among Thieves. Bend Studio also worked on Uncharted: Fight for Fortune in conjunction with One Loop Games.

Bend Studio's first original intellectual property (IP) after Syphon Filter was Days Gone, released in April 2019 for the PlayStation 4. Garvin and the game's director, Jeff Ross, left the studio by December 2020. However, Garvin claims the company fired him for having "a disruptive personality". Bend Studio has distanced itself from Garvin after his complaint on Twitter where he blamed "woke" reviewers for the middling critical reception of Days Gone.

As of June 2021, Bend Studio was working on a new IP that builds on the open-world systems from Days Gone. In June 2022, Bend Studio unveiled their new logo. In January 2025, Sony cancelled Bend Studio's live-service game that was in development since 2021. In June 2025, Jason Schreier of Bloomberg reported that Bend Studio had laid off 30% of their staff (around 40 employees). Sony would go on to confirm that layoffs had taken place, but not say how many employees were affected.

== Games developed ==
Year	Title	Platform(s)	Publisher(s)	Ref(s).
1993	Columbo's Mystery Capers	Apple Newton	StarCore	
1993	Dell Crossword Puzzles	Apple Newton	StarCore	
1994	Dell Crossword Puzzles and Other Word Games	Apple Newton	StarCore	
1994	Motile	Apple Newton	StarCore	
1994	Live Action Football	Classic Mac OS, Microsoft Windows	Accolade	
1996	Bubsy 3D	PlayStation	Accolade	
1999	Syphon Filter	PlayStation	Sony Computer Entertainment	
2000	Syphon Filter 2	PlayStation	Sony Computer Entertainment	
2001	Syphon Filter 3	PlayStation	Sony Computer Entertainment	
2004	Syphon Filter: The Omega Strain	PlayStation 2	Sony Computer Entertainment	
2006	Syphon Filter: Dark Mirror	PlayStation 2, PlayStation Portable	Sony Computer Entertainment	
2007	Syphon Filter: Logan's Shadow	PlayStation 2, PlayStation Portable	Sony Computer Entertainment	
2007	Syphon Filter: Combat Ops	PlayStation Portable	Sony Computer Entertainment	
2009	Resistance: Retribution	PlayStation Portable	Sony Computer Entertainment	
2011	Uncharted: Golden Abyss	PlayStation Vita	Sony Computer Entertainment	
2012	Uncharted: Fight for Fortune	PlayStation Vita	Sony Computer Entertainment	
2019	Days Gone	Microsoft Windows, PlayStation 4, PlayStation 5	Sony Interactive Entertainment	
