= Apocalyptic =

Apocalyptic is from Ancient Greek: ἀποκάλυψις, romanized: apokálupsis meaning "an unveiling or unfolding of things not previously known and which could not be known apart from the unveiling, revelation".

Apocalyptic may also refer to:

- Apocalyptic literature, a genre of religious writing
- Apocalyptic and post-apocalyptic fiction, a subgenre of science fiction, science fantasy or horror fiction involving global catastrophic risk
- Apocalypticism, the belief that the end of time is near
- Apocalyptic (album), a 2010 album by the Swedish death metal band Evocation
- "Apocalyptic" (song), a 2015 song by the American hard rock band Halestorm

== See also ==
- Apocalypse (disambiguation)
- Apocalypse, a literary genre in Christian religious culture
