= Slant Six Games =

Canadian video game developer (2005–2013)

- Type: Private
- Industry: Video games
- Founded: 2005
- Defunct: 2013
- Fate: Closed
- Headquarters: Vancouver, British Columbia
- Key people: Brian Thalken (Managing Director); Dan Mcbride (Director of Development); Paul Martin (Director of Technology); Peter Doidge-Harrison (Producer & Technical Director); Alan Bucior (Technical Director); Scott Paterson (Art Director)
- Parent: Independent
- Website: slantsixgames.com

Slant Six Games was a Canadian independent video game developer based in Vancouver, British Columbia, Canada. The company's name is derived from the 1959 Chrysler engine of the same name that powered the Plymouth Valiant and Dodge Dart.

== History ==
Formed in 2005, Slant Six Games developed the graphics engine for Syphon Filter: Dark Mirror. It then released three games published by Sony Computer Entertainment of America. SOCOM U.S. Navy SEALs: Tactical Strike for the PlayStation Portable was released in 2007. It was named the best PSP multiplayer experience at E3 2007.This was followed by the 2008 release of SOCOM U.S. Navy SEALs: Confrontation for PlayStation 3. In 2010, SOCOM U.S. Navy SEALs: Fireteam Bravo 3 was released for the PlayStation Portable.

In 2010, it was rumored that Slant Six would be working on a new Star Wars Battlefront game. However, it was reported that the title was later cancelled by LucasArts.

First rumored in 2010, it was officially announced in March 2011 that Slant Six would be working on a Resident Evil game for Capcom. In March 2012, Resident Evil: Operation Raccoon City was released. The game sold two million copies within two months and was called "a big success" by the publisher Capcom. Resident Evil: Operation Raccoon City was Capcom's 16th best selling title by May. Slant Six released a patch in June to fix various issues with the original release.

After the release of Operation Raccoon City, art assets for the studio's cancelled Battlefront game were discovered on the game disc. It was later reported that Slant Six had been working on another Resident Evil game, but it was cancelled following this leak. Around the same time, the company laid off 26 staff members while a remaining 70 we assigned to work on other projects.

In March 2012, Slant Six announced Strata Scavenger, its first original IP. The studio received a grant from Canada Media Fund. Strata Scavenger was to be a post-apocalyptic flight sim for PC, PlayStation Network, and Xbox Live Arcade in 2013.

However, the studio began transitioning to mobile game development that year. Strata Scavenger was refocused for iOS and The Bowling Dead, distributed by Activision, was released for the platform in November.

In March 2013, Slant Six and Microsoft Studios released Galactic Reign for PC and Windows Phone. The game contained epic space battles that took place in the cloud, instead of inside the game. Slant Six developed a cinematic engine to display the game's data. In April, the company underwent its third round of layoffs since 2010 and also self-published Max's Pirate Planet - A Board Game Adventure for mobile devices.

The studio announced the closure of Galactic Reign just five months after launch. It was removed from the Windows Store in August and servers remained on through the end of the year. The studio was closed soon after.

== Games ==
| Game title | Release date | Platform | Metacritic |
|---|---|---|---|
| SOCOM U.S. Navy SEALs: Tactical Strike | November 6, 2007 | PlayStation Portable | 72% (35 reviews) |
| SOCOM U.S. Navy SEALs: Confrontation | October 14, 2008 | PlayStation 3 | 63% (64 reviews) |
| SOCOM U.S. Navy SEALs: Fireteam Bravo 3 | February 16, 2010 | PlayStation Portable | 74% (51 reviews) |
| Resident Evil: Operation Raccoon City | March 20, 2012 | PlayStation 3 | 52% (36 reviews) |
| Resident Evil: Operation Raccoon City | March 20, 2012 | Xbox 360 | 52% (56 reviews) |
| Resident Evil: Operation Raccoon City | March 20, 2012 | Microsoft Windows | 48% (8 reviews) |
| The Bowling Dead | November 24, 2012 | iOS | 70% (6 reviews) |
| Galactic Reign | March 13, 2013 | Windows Phone, Windows 8 | |
| Max's Pirate Planet - A Board Game Adventure | April 25, 2013 | iOS, Android, Kindle Fire | |

== Hexane Engine ==
Slant Six developed Hexane, a proprietary game engine developed for console, PC, and mobile games.
