= Syphon Filter =

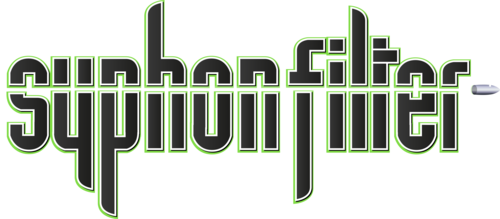
- Genres: Third-person shooter, stealth
- Developer: Bend Studio
- Publishers: Sony Computer Entertainment; 989 Studios (1999–2000)
- Creators: Richard Ham; John Garvin
- Platforms: PlayStation; PlayStation 2 PlayStation Portable
- First release: Syphon Filter; February 17, 1999
- Latest release: Syphon Filter: Logan's Shadow; October 2, 2007

Syphon Filter is a third-person shooter video game series created by Bend Studio (formerly Eidetic) and owned by Sony Interactive Entertainment. for the PlayStation, PlayStation 2 and PlayStation Portable. In the series, Syphon Filter is the name given to a mysterious biological weapon.

== Games ==
Release timeline
1999	Syphon Filter
2000	Syphon Filter 2
2001	Syphon Filter 3
2002
2003
2004	Syphon Filter: The Omega Strain
2005
2006	Syphon Filter: Dark Mirror
2007	Syphon Filter: Logan's Shadow

Aggregate review scores
Game	Metacritic
Syphon Filter	(PS) 90/100
Syphon Filter 2	(PS) 81% (Note: GameRankings score)
Syphon Filter 3	(PS) 73/100
Syphon Filter: The Omega Strain	(PS2) 65/100
Syphon Filter: Dark Mirror	(PSP) 87/100 (PS2) 70/100
Syphon Filter: Logan's Shadow	(PSP) 85/100

=== Syphon Filter (1999) ===
The plot centres on special agents, Gabriel Logan and Lian Xing, who are tasked by the United States government to apprehend Erich Rhoemer, an international terrorist.

=== Syphon Filter 2 (2000) ===
The plot picks up immediately after where the previous Syphon Filter ended. Gabe sets out to cure the virus, whilst being targeted as a "terrorist" by the United States government.

=== Syphon Filter 3 (2001) ===
Gabe and his team are suspected of treason. Summoned to prove their innocence, the team recounts the incidents that led to this moment. In the background, Gabe moves to rid the world of Syphon Filter once and for all.

=== Syphon Filter: The Omega Strain (2004) ===
Gabe, now commander of a government agency, leads global investigation of viral outbreaks in order to stop a deadlier strain of the titular virus from emerging. Unlike previous games, the main protagonist is I.P.C.A. recruit Cobra, while Gabe and Lian Xing appear as supporting NPCs. In multiplayer, a maximum of three more characters may join Cobra, these are Python, Dragon and Viper.

=== Syphon Filter: Dark Mirror (2006) ===
Following a mixed reception of The Omega Strain, Dark Mirror is a return to the series' roots. Gabe investigates a terrorist incident in an Alaskan oil refinery, only to discover a big conspiracy around the titular Dark Mirror. This is the first Syphon Filter title developed for PlayStation Portable. The PlayStation 2 port removed multiplayer and mature content, but restored the roll ability.

=== Syphon Filter: Logan's Shadow (2007) ===
Serving as a direct sequel to Dark Mirror, Gabe receives a mission to retrieve stolen military equipment from Somali pirates, while discovering that his partner, Lian Xing, could be a double agent.

The PlayStation 2 port released in 2010.
