= Syphon Filter: Dark Mirror =

2006 video game

- North American PSP cover art
- Developer: Bend Studio
- Publisher: Sony Computer Entertainment
- Producer: Darren Yager
- Designers: Ron Allen; Scott Youngblood
- Writers: John Garvin; Connie Booth
- Composers: Clint Bajakian; Mark Snow; Lior Rosner
- Series: Syphon Filter
- Platforms: PlayStation Portable, PlayStation 2
- Release: PlayStation Portable: NA: March 14, 2006; AU: September 7, 2006; EU: September 29, 2006; PlayStation 2: NA: September 18, 2007; EU: November 2, 2007; AU: November 8, 2007
- Genres: Third-person shooter, stealth
- Modes: Single-player, multiplayer

Syphon Filter: Dark Mirror is a 2006 third-person shooter video game developed by Bend Studio and published by Sony Computer Entertainment for the PlayStation Portable and PlayStation 2. It is the fifth installment in the Syphon Filter franchise and a sequel to 2004's Syphon Filter: The Omega Strain. It is the last game to be developed by Sony Computer Entertainment America's Oregon unit before it was rebranded to Bend Studio. The PSP version of Syphon Filter: Dark Mirror was released on March 21, 2023, on the PlayStation 4 and PlayStation 5.

== Gameplay ==
As with the trilogy and unlike the previous game, the gameplay is a return to the series roots. Players resume the role of Gabe Logan and occasionally Lian Xing, special operatives for a secret government agency. The non-linear, open-ended feel of the previous game has been reverted to the linear gameplay. Several types of weapons and vision modes are introduced. Players can now hide against walls and shoot around corners, but the roll ability is noticeably absent.

=== Multiplayer ===
The game is ad hoc and infrastructure compatible, both supporting up to 8 players in a single game. Players can use the PSP Headset online to chat with others in the pre-game lobby, and in-game:

- Deathmatch: Standard deathmatch. The player who reaches the point limit or has the highest score after time runs out is the winner.
- Team Deathmatch: There are three factions, the IPCA, the Akram Brotherhood, and Red Section. Each has its own unique weapon sets. The team who reaches the point limit first or has the highest score after time runs out is the winner.
- Rogue Agent: When the game starts, every player is on the same team. Everyone must rush to a fixed location and run over a kit to become the rogue agent. The rogue agent is then teleported away from all other players and spawns with a new skin and a special weapon. Kills only count for the rogue agent. When the rogue agent is killed, he drops the kit, and whoever runs it over becomes the new rogue agent. Whoever has the highest score after time runs out or reaches the kill limit is the winner.
- Objective: Each team has a set number of lives and they must complete objectives to win. One team must defend while the other team assaults, either trying to destroy something or carry an object back to another location. If a team completes all objectives before time runs out or defends successfully, they will win. If a team's reinforcements are depleted, they lose.

== Plot ==
Following the events of Syphon Filter: The Omega Strain, Gabe sends a note to Mara Aramov. As she reads the note, a cracked scope appears from an adjacent balcony. It is quickly revealed that Gabe has sent Gary "Stone" Stoneman to kill Mara due to her manipulative role in the Syphon Filter fiasco. Also revealed is a private conference between Mara and Elsa Weissinger, who was conspiring alongside Mara; the duo being secret lovers.

Two years after the assassination of the treacherous Aramov and Weissinger by Stone, Gabe from the International Presidential Consulting Agency (IPCA) is summoned to Kemsynth Petroleum in Alaska by the U.S. government. A paramilitary group known only as Red Section has taken the complex. Upon heading into the Kemsynth facility, Gabe comes across and kills Red Section commanders Red Jack and Black King. Before Gabe could rescue any living hostages, two of them, Kreisler and Freeman, commit suicide, the former using a mysterious flower, the latter having swallowed a cyanide capsule.

A data disc reveals that the attack is connected to Kemsynth's botanical department in Peru in charge of making a new pesticide. The IPCA also learn that a former Agency operative, Addison Hargrove, who was Gabe's first partner romantically and professionally, is in charge of security. Gabe enters Peru to find the revolutionary forces allied with Red Section destroying Kemsynth's laboratories in Iquitos. Upon searching the area, Gabe saves Addison from interrogation by a Red Section member, Black Viper. Prior to their escape, the pair discover and retrieve samples of the rare plants found on Kreisler and Freeman before being ambushed by Red Section member White Scorpion. Gabe and Addison manage to kill White Scorpion and his henchmen, only for Addison to disappear after extraction.

The recently gathered intelligence leads Gabe to a weapons factory in Bosnia. As with Peru, a group of local rebels have been aided by Red Section. Here, Gabe rescues a United Nations soldier, Private Janzen. Gabe tries to reunite Janzen with his squad, only to find they have been slaughtered. The pair meet up with Kress, a Red Section mole posing as a UN medical officer. Kress requests that Gabe recover some medical equipment so that he can treat a wounded soldier and Logan accepts the phony mission but finds there is no medical supplies and is ambushed by rebel forces ostensibly working for the traitor. Logan fights off the enemy troops but Janzen and the unnamed soldier are murdered by Kress. Logan kills Kress and the rebel movement commander, Goran Zimovic, the latter having hijacked an M1 Abrams main battle tank. An upload of Kress's files from his laptop reveals the names of Red Section leaders: Touchstone and Singularity.

Gabe heads to Kaliningrad where his MI6 counterpart has installed recording devices in a casino serving as a Yavlinsky crime family front. (While in Yavlinsky's casino, Gabe discovers that Niculescu formerly laundered cash and weapons to Red Section and that Mara was an assassin hired by Yavlinsky eight years ago) After dealing with Victor Yavlinsky and his security forces, Gabe finds the MI6 recording devices and leaves the casino, killing Red Section elites in the process, the latter having been sent by Touchstone to liquidate any incriminating evidence due to Yavlinsky's death.

Gabe meets Addison in Warsaw where she tells him the reason she left the agency: she had a daughter whose name was Blake. Gabe tries to find out whether he is her father but Addison claims that she is only ten. Blake was kidnapped recently by Red Section to make Addison give them what they want. The deal is for Addison to meet Touchstone, the second-in-command of Red Section, at TransEuro Tram station in Zugspitze and turn over the disc containing information on Project Dark Mirror, the one she stole from KemSynth office in Iquitos, in exchange for Blake. Addison began having doubts about KemSynth creating a new DDT and tells Gabe she doesn't want to hand over the disc to Red Section.

They made a plan: Addison would provoke Touchstone into talking by bargaining with him while Gabe would take Touchstone out. They attempt the exchange, but Addison discovers Touchstone brought snipers with him. After failing to drive Touchstone into a bargain, Addison hits Touchstone. He pushes her over the railing into the valley, and to her apparent death. Gabe feels guilty and sorry and he fills up with fury and rage. He decides to complete Addison's last wish: save her daughter. He chases after Touchstone and defeats him. Prior to Touchstone's death, Gabe tells him that nobody chooses their death and throws Touchstone down the mountains.

After the confrontation, Gabe learns how Red Section was formed, and Singularity's real identity, Grant Morrill: an Interpol accountant who disappeared five years earlier and started his own company, Aeroscience Integrated Technology (AIT), establishing headquarters in Helsinki. He stole whatever classified information he encountered to eventually begin his own organisation. Gabe and Lian head to AIT to end Red Section's future operations and save Blake. Inside AIT, he learns that Singularity developed electromagnetic super-armor which deflect projectiles, except those from electronic weapons. Gabe and Lian succeed in rescuing Blake, while Singularity hacks into IPCA's database. Gabe confronts Singularity in a bullet train station. Singularity has built canisters of the element known only as Project Dark Mirror, a nerve gas that could kill millions by fusing with oxygen molecules. In the battle, Singularity mocks Logan's previous operations, referencing the events of the previous games, and further taunts Gabe that they are equal. After uttering his last words, Logan kicks Singularity in front of a moving train, which kills him. Logan reunites with Blake and Lian.

Gabe heads to Addison's mausoleum at Arlington National Cemetery a week later and leaves a flower, the same flower Singularity used to genetically engineer the nerve gas Dark Mirror. In a post-credits cutscene, Addison re-appears behind Gabe, telling him that she faked her death. She prepared for her death in advance and tied herself with a bungee cord to the railing. Gabe is upset that she once lied to him.

Blake comes inside and greets Gabe. He honors her as the bravest ten-year-old he's ever met. She corrects him, by saying she is twelve, not ten: Addison left him, and the Agency, twelve years ago because she was pregnant with his child and didn't want her involved. Gabe attempts to tell Blake the truth about himself, but is stopped by Addison, who states that Gabe will never want to leave the Agency, and that he could end up causing indirect harm to Blake. Gabe reluctantly lets them leave.

A bonus level in Bangkok takes place after the AIT assault. Jimmy Zhou, a gang leader tries using the avian bird flu as a weapon against his rivals. Gabe kills the birds and learns that Zhou has taken Lian hostage. Inside his penthouse, Gabe faces an army of Zhou soldiers, including one with a Gatling gun. Gabe manages to rescue Lian and kills Zhou.

== Sequel and port ==
A sequel for the PSP, Syphon Filter: Logan's Shadow, was released on October 2, 2007.

A port of Dark Mirror for the PlayStation 2 was released on September 18, 2007, with updated graphics. Much mature content was removed, censoring much violence, swearing, alcohol and frightening scenes. As a result, the ESRB rating of the PlayStation 2 version is Teen instead of the Mature rating of the PlayStation Portable version of the game.

== Reception ==
Reception

Aggregate score
Aggregator	Score
Metacritic	(PSP) 87/100 (PS2) 70/100

Syphon Filter: Dark Mirror received "generally positive" reviews, according to review aggregator Metacritic.
