= Syphon Filter 3 =

2001 video game

- Developer: Sony Computer Entertainment America
- Publisher: Sony Computer Entertainment
- Producer: Darren Yager
- Designer: Jeff Ross
- Programmer: Christopher Reese
- Artist: John Garvin
- Writers: John Garvin; Richard Ham
- Composers: Christopher Stevens; Chuck Doud
- Series: Syphon Filter
- Platform: PlayStation
- Release: NA: November 6, 2001; EU: November 30, 2001
- Genre: Third-person shooter
- Modes: Single-player, multiplayer

Syphon Filter 3 is a 2001 third-person shooter video game developed and published by Sony Computer Entertainment for the PlayStation. It is the third installment in the Syphon Filter series and the last to be released on the PlayStation. It was re-released in 2023 for the PlayStation 4 and PlayStation 5.

== Gameplay ==
The player experiences a third-person shooter that strongly emphasizes action, with less reliance on stealth compared to previous entries. According to the developers, there was a deliberate shift toward more fast-paced combat, and players are encouraged to engage enemies directly rather than always sneaking through levels. Movement is fluid, and the camera allows free rotation to track threats and navigate the environments.

The game offers a very large and varied arsenal. As explained by the development team, new weapons include an X-ray gun, explosive shotgun rounds, proximity mines, and a concealable submachine gun, while legacy weapons like the grenade launcher, night-vision rifle, and taser also return. Particularly, one notable weapon is the Steyr AUG with an infrared scope that enables “seeing through” walls, while other gadgets such as a mine detector and a heartbeat sensor also expand tactical options.

In addition to the core campaign missions, Syphon Filter 3 introduces a variety number of mini-games. These side challenges include evasion (dodging pursuers), retrieval (fetching or defending items), and demolition tasks. The mini-games are not only for diversifying gameplay, but technically, they were made using the existing scripting engine (SyphonScript) rather than being built with entirely new code.

Multiplayer in Syphon Filter 3 features some significant enhancements. The two-player mode features approximately ten or more arenas, some drawn from single-player levels and even classic maps from earlier games. To encourage more strategic engagements, the designers added sniper posts, gas grenades, and layout changes to favor tactical play rather than pure run-and-gun deathmatches. There are also many playable characters in multiplayer, giving the mode variety and playability.

Given the breadth of weapons, gadgets, and mission types, the gameplay loop in Syphon Filter 3 emphasizes adaptability: players must decide when to use stealth, when to trigger a firefight, and which tool best fits the situation. The inclusion of mini-games and a robust multiplayer mode extends the game’s longevity well beyond the campaign, offering both short bursts of gameplay and more traditional objective-based action.

== Plot ==
Secretary of State Vince Hadden brings in Gabriel Logan, Lian Xing and Lawrence Mujari to testify in Congress about their relationship to the Agency. He believes all three to be guilty, and questions them after they assassinate Shi-Hao from a hotel in Japan. The three do not realize that Hadden is involved in the conspiracy, and is looking for scapegoats.

Gabe begins by describing the first Syphon Filter investigation. He and Lian went to Costa Rica to find missing Agent Ellis. When they arrive, the two see that Erich Rhoemer has ordered Ellis killed, but Gabe must continue his mission and identify what Rhoemer was doing at the drug plantation. Gabe chases Rhoemer onto an airplane despite his Agency superior Edward Benton denying him permission. Gabe did not know back then that Benton and the Agency controlled Rhoemer, who escaped from the plane.

Mujari testifies next, and tells Hadden how he once worked for a resistance during the Apartheid era in South Africa. At the Pugari Gold Mine, he discovered that mining slaves had caught a deadly plague and the mine owners were covering it up. Mujari retrieved samples and gave them to Teresa Lipan.

When it's Lian's turn to testify, she details her first encounter with Gabe during the Soviet–Afghan War and her role in the Costa Rica operation. Meanwhile, Gabe goes to Ireland with MI6 agent Maggie Powers in an effort to scuttle a shipment of Syphon Filter, denying possession to the consortium and the local IRA cell. On board the S.S. Lorelei, Gabe plants several explosives and finds a document that will point to a virus test site in Australia. He also looks for any information on the mysterious arms consortium that controls the Agency. Gabe uncovers a mole in MI6, Nigel Cummings, who is aiding them. He kills Nigel and secures the last viral transport on the docks. The Lorelei is sunk with all hands lost.

Back in Washington, D.C., Gabe talks about his first meeting with Benton during the Soviet–Afghan conflict. Benton claimed to be a CIA agent transporting weapons to Afghans rebelling against the Soviets, but when Gabe and Ellis escorted the convoy, the Afghans attacked them. Gabe reaches Kabul and meets Lian, who sets up the diversion. However, a tank gets in their way, so Gabe destroys it. He learns that Benton was supplying arms to the Soviets, and was really an Agency operative.

As Hadden questions Gabe, Lian teams up with Maggie to abduct Dr. Elsa Weissinger from the Australian test site. Elsa is ready to betray the conspirators since Aramov left her behind, and she has Lian assemble a vaccine for aborigines held captive by Commander Silvers. Silvers plans to kill the test subjects, so Lian kills him first. When she returns to Elsa, Lian finds her gone.

Hadden accuses Gabe of lying and corruption. He believes Gabe murdered Teresa, but Teresa surprises him by appearing herself. Agency operative Jason Chance had only injured her, not killed. She describes her first meeting with Gabe during her time as an officer with the Bureau of Alcohol, Tobacco, and Firearms. A group of NSA agents headed by Colonel Silvers were posing as FBI to eradicate a private militia that had recovered data from a government satellite. Gabe, as an Agency operative, saved her life, and helped her when she rescued the wife and son of the militia leader. She left the ATF and joined the Agency.

Teresa faked her death to find the people behind the Agency. Her investigations into Aramov yielded a connection to Hadden himself. Before Gabe can apprehend him, Mara kills Hadden. She and several consortium terrorists take over the Senate building, but Gabe prevents her from detonating any explosives. He chases her onto a train full of hostages, and wounds her.

In a post-credits cutscene, Mara escapes despite being incarcerated. Gabe decides to find her, but for now the Syphon Filter crisis appears to be over with the death of Hadden. Gabe will become the new Agency director, and free it from corruption. Little does he know that an operation is ongoing near the S.S. Lorelei's wreck site. People are recovering the viral crates, and Mara is heard laughing, setting the stage for Syphon Filter: The Omega Strain.

== Release ==
The game was developed by Sony Bend, which was formed after Sony's purchase of Eidetic. It was originally slated for release on September 25, 2001, but the fallout of the September 11 attacks forced Sony to postpone the release while modifying the marketing campaign; the game was eventually released in November. The game's original cover had Gabe and Lian in action inside a courtroom that had a U.S. flag in the background amidst a swirl of gas. The anthrax scare following the attacks resulted in the cover being changed to a simple one showing Gabe's and Lian's faces, while the header line "United States Federal Bureau of Investigation" on the back cover was changed to "Agency Mission Briefing".

== Reception ==
Reception

Aggregate score
Aggregator	Score
Metacritic	73/100

Review scores
Publication	Score
GameRevolution	B−
GameSpot	6.5/10
IGN	7.5/10
Next Generation	4/5

Syphon Filter 3 received "mixed or average" reviews, according to review aggregator Metacritic.

Tommy Layton reviewed the PlayStation version of the game for Next Generation, rating it four stars out of five, praising the graphics, gameplay, story and level design.
