= Apocalyptica (video game) =

2003 video game

- Developer(s): Extreme FX
- Publisher(s): Konami
- Composer(s): Black Wave Digital Music
- Platform(s): Microsoft Windows
- Release: EU: 24 October 2003
- Genre(s): Third-person shooter
- Mode(s): Single-player, multiplayer

Apocalyptica is a third-person shooter video game developed by British studio Extreme FX (in their only official development credit) and published by Konami for Microsoft Windows on 24 October 2003.

== Gameplay ==
Players control several different technologically advanced, religious super-soldiers (with four classes distinguishing between the larger number of characters) in a mission to destroy the armies of Neo-Satan, in locations like outer space, Nu Hades, and Hell.

There are several weapon sets that the player can select (some unlocked in later levels), including a pistol and sword, a rifle, several spells, and later, large two-handed swords which heal the player with some of the damage done.

There are a variety of different missions which have different ways to be completed. Some missions are simply objective-based, requiring the player to reach the end point of the mission, which may be accessed by using buttons or levers to open gates. Others require the rescue of hostages, and some require holding all of certain points on the map, while others are a fight over a certain object.

In multiplayer mode, there are the classic games of Capture the Flag, Deathmatch, and Team Deathmatch against other players or the AI.

== Reception ==
The game received generally negative reviews from critics. On the review aggregator GameRankings, it had an average score of 40% based on 7 reviews. On Metacritic, the game had an average score of 34 out of 100, based on 5 reviews.

Bob Colayco of GameSpot gave the game a rating of 3.1 out of 10, saying the game "is terrible from top to bottom, suffering from bland, derivative gameplay, simplistic level design, brain-dead AI, and a buggy graphics engine that chugs even at low resolution." Colayco said "The game was originally slated to ship for both the Xbox and the PC, but it doesn't take much time with the PC version to understand why the console version was scrapped.", saying that Konami quietly released the game and appeared to care little about it.
