= Syphon Filter: Logan's Shadow =

2007 video game

- North American PlayStation Portable box art
- Developer: Bend Studio
- Publisher: Sony Computer Entertainment
- Director: John Garvin
- Producer: Daryl L. Nichols
- Designers: Ron Allen; John E. Slaydon; Samuel Villanueva
- Programmers: Paul Bowman; Darren Chisum
- Writers: Greg Rucka; John Garvin
- Composers: Azam Ali; Justin Burnett; Jonathan Mayer
- Series: Syphon Filter
- Platforms: PlayStation Portable, PlayStation 2
- Release: PlayStation Portable: NA: October 2, 2007; EU: November 30, 2007; AU: December 6, 2007; PlayStation 2: NA: June 2, 2010
- Genre: Third-person shooter
- Modes: Single-player, multiplayer

Syphon Filter: Logan's Shadow is a 2007 third-person shooter video game developed by Bend Studio and published by Sony Computer Entertainment for the PlayStation Portable. A port to the PlayStation 2 was released in 2010. It is the sixth and final installment in the Syphon Filter franchise, and the sequel to 2006's Syphon Filter: Dark Mirror.

== Gameplay ==
Logan's Shadow is played from a third-person perspective. With the Havok physics, enemies and objects react realistically to gunfire and other means of interaction.

Logan's Shadow features weapons and gameplay mechanics new to the series. These include additions to the cover system such as side-to-side movement, leaning, and blind fire around obstacles and corners, an advanced melee system that allows Gabe to use enemies as human shields, regenerative health, and underwater combat.

== Plot ==
When the al-Jamil terrorist group assaults the U.S. Navy spy ship USS Mt. St. Helens, the National Intelligence Oversight Committee must rely on the Agency to secure the classified material within a cargo hold before the antagonists acquire it. NIOC Director Robert Cordell convinces Gabe Logan that he is their only option, but Teresa Lipan counters that this is an assignment outside of Agency jurisdiction. Gabe agrees to go anyway, for a chance at stopping terrorist leader Ghassan al-Bitar, a Syrian he almost caught a year ago, and with whom he has a score to settle.

With his partner Lian Xing on vacation in Cyprus, Gabe flies to the Indian Ocean where a clan of Somali pirates called the Warsingala Protectors have invaded the ship. Bitar is leading them, and Gabe suspects this assault involves more than a mere pirating operation. Intercepting Spec Ops communications, pilot Alima Haddad warns Gabe that Cordell did not tell him everything, and Logan realises the contents of Hold Five, a secret even to the U.S. Navy, are Bitar's primary target.

Establishing a link to St. Helens' communications dish, Alima attempts to extract Logan, but her helicopter is shot down. Despite Gabe's efforts, she dies. Frustrated and furious, Gabe destroys several pirate boats carrying stolen goods from St Helens and re-enters the ship via the damaged main hull. However, Bitar has already stolen the cargo inside Hold Five, which NIOC couriers ship.

When Gabe reaches the bridge, Arleigh Burke-class destroyers with the Fifth Fleet have already begun launching cruise missiles to scuttle their own ship. He tries to stop Bitar from escaping, but terrorist Fahid Tamer distracts him. Gabe kills Fahid and escapes from the ship before it sinks. His return to the Agency brings more complications when Cordell mentions Lian was "never" in Cyprus, and produces pictures of her with a Chinese man, both in a foreign land. From Cordell's point of view, Lian being a defector or a double agent, the Agency would be compromised, and the NIOC suspends the IPCA.

Despite Teresa's reservations, and running out of options, Gabe enlists a marine salvage expert Dane Bishop to explore the sunken St Helens for NIOC courier files that could have the information of where Lian was when she was photographed. The duo find Russian Spetsnaz divers are also searching for evidence. Gabe realises they work for Surgei Kudrenko, another antagonist who survived an attempt that Gabe made on his life on a mission years prior. Bishop cuts a hole inside the ship, sucking Logan into the hull, and Gabe destroys the engine turbines to flood the chamber. When they rendezvous, the pair stop the ship's nuclear reactor from melting down and kill Kudrenko's right-hand man, Surgeyev, before the enemy can escape with the courier codes.

The decoded microfiles show pictures captured by MI6 in Azerbaijan. Lian and the Chinese male are hostages, but the Spetsnaz are also looking for them, suggesting they found out about the St Helens through their intelligence resources. Compounding the situation are the Russians who are conducting genocidal killings and ethnic cleansing activities throughout the country. Worried that Lian might get killed, Gabe teams up with Maggie Powers, who claims to be in the same region to "track smugglers", to find out who captured Lian. While searching a hotel room shared by Lian and her accomplice, Gabe encounters a Chinese Secret Service agent, codenamed Trinidad. The two fight and kill Spetsnaz forces, but Trinidad abandons Logan to find Maggie on his own. Although he rescues her from interrogators, Kudrenko captures them after they destroy a Russian attack helicopter.

Inside a derelict gulag somewhere in Republic of Georgia, Trinidad confronts Gabe, the Chinese admitting that she was Lian's instructor in the MSS; but Xing defected when Gabe recruited her into the Agency, tarnishing Trinidad's reputation. According to Trinidad, her student used to be married to the man seen in the pictures, Shen Rei. The Chinese government wants him back because he is the inventor of the device stolen from the St. Helens, and Trinidad helps free Gabe from custody so he can find them. Logan wonders about the significance of the device, such that countries like America, Russia, China and Syria all want it. He begins to suspect Maggie is attempting to acquire it as well for England, and does not know whom to trust.

Gabe and Maggie stage an escape from the Russian prison, whereupon Gabe kills Kudrenko during an aeroplane firefight, but Cordell arrests Maggie and tells Logan he has shut down the agency; because the NIOC believes that Shen and Lian work for Bitar. Cordell had used Gabe from the very start to locate them. The NIOC now knows where al-Jamil's desert stronghold is, but Logan is forced to accept early retirement. Against his belief that Cordell is right, Teresa informs Gabe that Lian is in love with him, and must be Bitar's prisoner if none of the world powers have Shen. Gabe realises that Cordell will bomb al-Jamil's base, and it will kill Lian.

He assists several Army Rangers in the assault on an al-Jamil facility, but Gabe must enter the bunker on his own in search of Bitar. He finds Lian alive, and the two study Shen's device, the X-Z-2. It then transpires that the device is Shen's solution to the energy crisis, but China wanted to weaponise it. Unwilling to have such a peaceful instrument become a weapon of war, Shen defected with Lian's help and fled to Pakistan. Gabe finds information proving that Cordell hired Bitar as a means to bring Shen to NIOC couriers. Cordell was desperate to retrieve the X-Z-2 before competing nations could, but Bitar had other plans. The latter elected to steal the device and use Shen to make bombs that would destroy oil sources, thus driving Western influence from the Middle East.

Everything Cordell did since then was a cover-up, and Gabe has him taken away by soldiers to ensure his own early retirement. Lian has difficulty talking to Gabe about Shen, and Gabe focuses on stopping al-Jamil at a Syrian dam which Bitar will use to charge the last of the X-Z-2 devices for future attacks on the West. During the mission, Lian becomes distracted with saving Shen, and abandons her post to find him, rendering herself incommunicado in the process. Gabe reaches Shen first, and the two disable most of the X-Z-2 bombs before going after Bitar. The terrorist tries to escape with the final bomb, but Shen has rigged it as a dud. Gabe shoots the sabotaged device, destroying it and killing his adversary.

He finds Lian and Shen outside the dam, but Trinidad also appears. She has shadowed Gabe the entire time, even when he was in Virginia. Trinidad's opinion being that Logan must be kept alive just so he can lead her to Shen, she provides covering fire for Gabe and murdered al-Jamil operatives on several occasions, but she still believes him expendable in the long run. Shen is unwilling to let his device become a weapon, so he commits suicide.

In a post-credits cutscene, Gabe and Lian return to the gym in Langley where Teresa had set up the remote command center during the Agency's shutdown. Gabe has decided he will retire, believing there are too many secrets in his work. Instead, he will look for Addison and Blake Hargrove while trying to begin a new life. They enter to find Mujari lying on the floor dead, and Teresa injured. She warns them to be careful, and Trinidad ambushes them. Gabe pushes Lian aside and kills Trinidad, but is fatally shot four times himself. He lies on the floor as Lian shouts and tries to revive him. (Note: Sony artist Athey Moravetz confirmed that Gabe was killed.)

== Multiplayer ==
Players can play as new factions in five game modes, two of which are new to the franchise. The new modes are Sabotage and Retrieval. Sabotage pits two teams against each other as they try to locate bomb codes and arm the other team's nuclear warhead and guard it to prevent them from disarming their bomb until the timer runs out, while Retrieval has players trying to retrieve a beacon from the enemy's base and return it to their own base to score a point. Returning modes are Deathmatch, Team Deathmatch, and Rogue Agent.

=== Combat Ops demo ===
Syphon Filter: Combat Ops

Syphon Filter: Combat Ops is a multiplayer game released on the PlayStation Network on November 20, 2007. Logan's Shadow features a playable sneak preview from the main menu. Players can create different missions by editing pre-existing maps (by adding their own objects, weapons, objectives, spawn points, factions, etc.) and other information. The missions can be placed online and shared with other players or through ad hoc.

== Reception ==
Reception

Aggregate score
Aggregator	Score
Metacritic	85/100

Syphon Filter: Logan's Shadow received "generally positive" reviews, according to review aggregator Metacritic. It was included in the retrospective book 1001 Video Games You Must Play Before You Die, which was originally published in 2010.

== Future ==
In 2015, it was reported that John Garvin was 'burned out' with Syphon Filter, which ruled out further SF games, according to ex-Sony Bend Artist Athey Moravetz on Reddit. But in a 2019 interview with Eurogame, Garvin said that he is open to the possibility of a remake or reboot in the future after the release of Days Gone.
