= Syphon Filter: The Omega Strain =

2004 video game

- PAL region cover art
- Developer: Sony Computer Entertainment America
- Publisher: Sony Computer Entertainment
- Producer: Darren Yager
- Designer: Scott Youngblood
- Programmer: Christopher Reese
- Artists: Shane Pierce; Gerald Harrison; Ben Throop
- Writer: John Garvin
- Composers: Mark Snow; Mike Reagan
- Series: Syphon Filter
- Platform: PlayStation 2
- Release: NA: May 4, 2004; EU: July 9, 2004
- Genre: Third-person shooter
- Modes: Single-player, multiplayer

Syphon Filter: The Omega Strain is a 2004 third-person shooter video game developed and published by Sony Computer Entertainment for the PlayStation 2. It is the fourth installment in the Syphon Filter franchise.

== Gameplay ==
The gameplay is a departure from the previous games. Rather than playing as Gabe Logan, the player is given the role of a new recruit working for Gabe's secret anti-terrorist organization, the IPCA. Gabe, however, can still be used in one bonus mission. Players are able to create an original agent using a character customization system. Each mission allows players to select weapons from an overwhelming abundance, including assault rifles, carbines, machine guns, knives, grenades and more.

Four bonus missions can be unlocked, with each allowing players to take on a certain character. Players cannot choose specific weapons in each bonus mission, and must complete every mission using a fixed weapon set that the game designates. As per the convention of previous games, failing an objective or dying in any bonus mission will cause it to restart.

The game is nonlinear, where players are given choices to take on certain tasks, or avoid them altogether. Role-playing elements are added so that players can create characters, level up their ranks, and unlock new weapons. Enemies spawn on a seemingly indefinite basis so that players can never clear an area.

== Plot ==
Following the destruction of the original Syphon Filter virus, Gabriel "Gabe" Logan repurposes the agency as the International Presidential Consulting Agency, serving as a counter-terrorism unit. As Commander-in-Chief, Logan has Lian Xing, Teresa Lipan, Lawrence Mujari, and Dr. Elsa Weissinger serve as his officers.

An Agency team headed by Imani Gray is deployed to a besieged city in Michigan in order to rescue Mujari, who disappeared while investigating Dr. Richard Broussard's ties with the Anarchiste Liberation Army. Imani and her team successfully rescue Mujari, and assassinate the ALA leadership. The government later imprisons the remaining ALA members. Afterwards, they prepare for their next assignment.

Meanwhile, IPCA commander Gary Stoneman assassinates Italian mafia leader Dimitri Alexopoulous to prevent his acquisition of the Omega Strain in Italy. The team follows Stoneman to Belarus and tracks a shipment of infected cattle to Ivankov's residence. They discover that his courier, Yuschenko, is selling the Omega Strain, and Agency pilot Alima Haddad is captured by the Chechens during the operation, leading Stoneman to assume she is dead.

While Stone and the agents are in Belarus, Lian is deployed to Kyrgyzstan in order to eliminate an arms deal involving a local warlord and the North Koreans.

Gabe reluctantly enlists help from Mossad agent Ehud Ben Zohar upon determining Yuschenko's plans to sell the virus to Fatha Al-Hassan, a Yemeni leader. Zohar only cares about stopping Al-Hassan's network, so he steals the viral canister after the Agency assassinate Yuschenko. Zohar and the team enter Al-Hassan's palace disguised as the dead Chechens in order to assassinate him. In the aftermath, they exchange the contracts for the virus.

The team later investigates a lead recovered from the Belarus operation that shows Dr. Nikolai Jandran is conducting virus tests at a local university. Maggie Powers assists in recovering evidence before the university's destruction.

Shortly after recovering, Mujari conducts his own investigation into the Chechens and photographs Russian forces committing war atrocities for future blackmail. Afterwards, Mujari takes control of the Agency team as they check the wreckage of the S.S. Lorelei. The university turned up salvaged boxes, indicating an undersea operation. The team evacuates the salvage rig before destroying the viral containers with the help of nuclear weapons. However, Jandran dies from a serum before he can be brought back for questioning.

While Gabe faces pressure from the U.S. President and Alex Birchim of the White House Internal Affairs, he sends Lian and the team to track North Korean agent Yong-Jun Kim, a man connected to the Yakuza's Murakawa Industries in Japan. The investigation reveals that Murakawa was helping develop the Omega Strain. Aramov arrived before Lian and forced Murakawa to commit suicide for trusting Kim. Kim posed as an employee working with Murakawa, so he could get the virus.

Shortly after destroying the Japanese labs, the team is re-deployed to recover Imani in Myanmar. The plane carrying Imani and Kim had been shot down. Guilt-ridden, Lian takes the team to recover her body and the viral sample Kim was carrying. Despite claims that inclement weather brought down the jet, they find evidence indicating that Aramov had bribed the Myanmar Army to shoot down the plane.

Gabe becomes frustrated with his investigation into the secret corporation Meta Global Funds, which he believes controls the Syphon Filter conspiracy. The purchase of Murakawa Industries by Meta Global was possible through Niculescu Funds, headed by international banker Mihai Niculescu. He deduces that Niculescu as the mastermind behind the conspiracy. Against Birchim's and the President's instructions, Gabe brings the Agency team to the headquarters in Zurich, Switzerland. They find evidence linking Birchim to bribes, but nothing implicating Niculescu, and upload a virus to destroy all the computer records while sending them to Agency database.

Failing to find anything in Switzerland, Gabe conducts a solo investigation into Niculescu's Montenegro estate in a final effort to expose him. Although he did not find physical evidence, he learns of Aramov's ties to Niculescu and learns that Ivankov plans to nuke Russia.

Having learned of Ivankov's location from Mara, the Agency mobilizes to his base and prevents the missile's launch. Stoneman recovers an injured Alima. Ivankov is eventually killed by Gabe while attempting to escape.

Thanks to tissue and virus samples recovered by the IPCA, a vaccine for the Omega Strain virus is successfully synthesized, ending the threat with the aid of the World Health Organization. The President congratulates the IPCA and has Birchim arrested. Niculescu is killed by two anonymous gunmen as a result of his bank's sabotage. Dr. Weissinger gives a written admission that she had the recruit kill Dr. Jandran, as well as signs of mental instability before disappearing from the Agency. In a post-credits scene, Stoneman aims his rifle at Aramov to assassinate her on Gabe's order.

== Development ==
In a June 2007 interview with GameSpy, franchise veteran John Garvin maintained his attachment to the game, and explained that it was originally not intended to feature a single-player mode. Garvin implied that the ability to play through the campaign alone had been tacked on at the demand of parent company Sony Computer Entertainment, late into the development process, in order to broaden the game's appeal.

=== Canadian controversy ===
The first three levels of the game's campaign mode were to originally be set in Toronto, Canada, but were changed a few months before the game's release due to criticism from some Canadians who disapproved of the mission's premise, which depicted Quebecois nationalists perpetrating a terrorist attack against the Toronto subway. References to the city's name were removed, with it being renamed to the fictional U.S. city of Carthage, Michigan. Overlooked vestiges of the level as originally envisaged by the developers can still be seen in the finished game, notably pictures of the Toronto skyline, Toronto police cars, as well as a few remaining references to Canada and Toronto that were overlooked.

== Reception ==
Reception

Aggregate score
Aggregator	Score
Metacritic	65/100

Review scores
Publication	Score
GameRevolution	C−
GameSpot	6.5/10
IGN	7.6/10

Syphon Filter: The Omega Strain received "mixed or average" reviews, according to review aggregator Metacritic.
