= Jennifer Hale filmography =

Voice actress filmography

Jennifer Hale is a Canadian-American voice, television and film actress known for her work in video game series including Baldur's Gate, Mass Effect, Metal Gear Solid, Spider-Man, BioShock Infinite, and Star Wars: Knights of the Old Republic. In 2013, she was recognized by Guinness World Records as "the most prolific video game voice actor (female)".

== Voice-over filmography ==
=== Animation ===
List of voice performances in animation
Year	Series	Role	Notes	Ref(s)
1994–98	Where on Earth Is Carmen Sandiego?	Ivy		
1994–95	Skeleton Warriors	Jennifer Steele / Talyn		
1994	SWAT Kats: The Radical Squadron	Turmoil's Lieutenant	Episode: "Cry Turmoil/SWAT Kats Unplugged"	
1995	Phantom 2040	Analytical	2 episodes	
1995–97	Spider-Man: The Animated Series	Felicia Hardy / Black Cat		
1995–96	The Tick	Carmelita		
1995–96	Iron Man	Julia Carpenter / Spider-Woman, Ghost (Season 2, Episodes 14-26)		
1995–96	The Savage Dragon	She-Dragon	Grouped under Additional Voices	
1995–96	Biker Mice from Mars	Harley		
1996	Bruno the Kid	Leecy Davidson		
1996–97	The Real Adventures of Jonny Quest	Jessica Bannon		
1996–97	Adventures from the Book of Virtues	Fairy, Maiden, Mountain Cloud	2 episodes	
1996–97	Mighty Ducks: The Animated Series	Mallory McMallard		
1997	Tamagotchi Video Adventures	Voice actor		
1997	Pinky and the Brain	Winny	Episode: "Operation Sea Lion"	
1997–2004	Johnny Bravo	Various characters		
1997–99	Superman: The Animated Series	Gsptlsnz, additional voices	3 episodes	
1998	Dexter's Laboratory	Miss Pimmerwickle, Record, Southern Bell	Episode: "Quiet Riot/Accent You Hate/Catch of the Day"	
1998	Cow and Chicken	Various characters	2 episodes	
1998–2005	The Powerpuff Girls	Ms. Keane, Princess Morbucks, Sedusa		
1999	The Chimp Channel	Marina	Animal voice-over	
1999	Batman Beyond	Jessie	Episode: "Hooked Up"	
1999	Detention	Leena	Episode: "Little Miss Popular"	
1999–2001	Spider-Man Unlimited	Lady Vermin, Haley Wing, Katherine O'Malley, Mary Jane Watson, others		
1999–2001	Rocket Power	Paula Dullard, others		
2000	Sonic Underground	Lydia	Episode: "When in Rome"	
2001	The Zeta Project	Gloria Buenaventura	Episode: "Kid Genius"	
2001–02	House of Mouse	Cinderella, Aurora		
2001–02	Grim & Evil	Gladys (Billy's Mom)		
2001–07	The Grim Adventures of Billy & Mandy	Gladys (Billy's Mom), others		
2001–03	Samurai Jack	Various characters		
2001–15	Totally Spies!	Sam, Mandy, others	Grouped under "With the Voice Talents of"	
2002	Gotham Girls	Det. Selma Reesedale, Dora Smithy, Caroline Greenway		
2002–06	Justice League	Black Siren, Inza Cramer, Giganta, Killer Frost, others		
2002–06	What's New, Scooby-Doo?	Thorn/Sally McKnight, Various characters		
2002–08	Codename: Kids Next Door	Numbuh 86 / Fanny Fulbright, Mrs. Thompson, others		
2003	All Grown Up!	Brett, Diane	Episode: "Coup DeVille"	
2003	Spider-Man: The New Animated Series	Female News Announcer, Female Reporter	2 episodes	
2003	Fillmore!	Natasha	Episode: "The Currency of Doubt"	
2003	Stuart Little	Eleanor Little, Martha Little		
2003–05	Xiaolin Showdown	Katnappe		
2003–05	Duck Dodgers	Various characters	2 episodes	
2004	The Batman	Becky	Episode: "The Big Dummy"	
2004–05	Megas XLR	Various characters		
2004–06	Brandy & Mr. Whiskers	Margo, Gina, others		
2004–06	Justice League Unlimited	Giganta, Killer Frost, Zatanna, Inza Cramer, others		
2005	American Dragon: Jake Long	Various characters	2 episodes	
2005	Kim Possible	Action Hero, Pals girl	Episode: "Dimension Twist"	
2005–07	Ben 10	Rojo, various characters		
2005–08	Avatar: The Last Airbender	June, Avatar Kyoshi		
2005–08	Camp Lazlo	Mrs. McCannon, Misty, Suzie		
2006	Gloria, Wilma et moi	Gloria		
2006–07	Legion of Super Heroes	Emerald Empress, Martha Kent, others		
2006–07	Class of 3000	Madison, others		
2007	Random! Cartoons	Ms. Penelope, Express Mail, Co-Worker #3, Mom	2 episodes	
2007	Biker Mice from Mars	Harley	Episode: "Turf Wars"	
2008	Back at the Barnyard	Mom	Episode: "Meet the Ferrets"	
2008–09	Wolverine and the X-Men	Jean Grey, Boom-Boom, others		
2009–10	Star Wars: The Clone Wars	Aayla Secura, Riyo Chuchi, Lolo Purs		
2009	Chowder	Various characters	2 episodes	
2009	The Amazing Spiez!	Sam	Episode: "Operation: Dude Ranch Disaster"	
2009–11	Batman: The Brave and the Bold	Ramona, Zatanna, Poison Ivy, Ice, Killer Frost		
2010–11	G.I. Joe: Renegades	Wendy	2 episodes	
2010–12	The Avengers: Earth's Mightiest Heroes	Carol Danvers / Ms. Marvel, Corrina, various others		
2010–13	Regular Show	Veronica, Margaret's Mom, Thomas' Mom	3 episodes	
2010–13	Scooby-Doo! Mystery Incorporated	Various characters		
2010	T.U.F.F. Puppy	Various characters		
2011	Marvel Anime: X-Men	Jean Grey / Phoenix	English dub	
2011–13	Green Lantern: The Animated Series	Carol Ferris, Princess Gi'ata, others		
2011–13	Generator Rex	Black Knight, others		
2012–13	Motorcity	Foxy	Episode: "The Duke of Detroit"	
2012	Star Wars Detours	Major Steel		
2012	Sofia the First	Cinderella, Violet, Suzette, Madam Collette, other	8 episodes	
2013–14	Xiaolin Chronicles	Kimiko, Willow (Shadow), Princess Kalia, others		
2013	The Legend of Korra	Avatar Kyoshi		
2013	Bravoman	Bravo Woman		
2014–16	Wander Over Yonder	Princess Demurra, Ripov		
2014	Turbo FAST	Bride #1, Bride #2, Bride #3		
2014	Ben 10: Omniverse	Rojo, Suemungousaur, Lewodan Female		
2015–16	Avengers Assemble	F.R.I.D.A.Y., Songbird / Screaming Mimi, Freya, Gabby Talbot, Black Widow, others		
2016–17	Guardians of the Galaxy	Mantis	8 episodes	
2017–18	Bunsen Is a Beast	Bunsen's Mom		
2017–21	DuckTales	Gabby McStabberson, others		
2017	Rick and Morty	Kiara	Episode: "The ABCs of Beth"	
2017	Star Wars Rebels	Commander DT-F16, Prisoner #2	Episode: "In the Name of the Rebellion"	
2019	Hanazuki: Full of Treasures	Depriva	Episode: "Underground Escape"	
2020	Star Trek: Lower Decks	Lieutenant Durga	Episode: "Much Ado about Boimler"	
2020–24	Blood of Zeus	Alexia's Mother, Artemis, Clotho, Lachesis, and Atropos	6 episodes	
2021	Love, Death & Robots	Proprietor	Episode: "Pop Squad"	
2023–24	Star Wars: The Bad Batch	Riyo Chuchi	4 episodes	
2023–24	The Dragon Prince	Domina Profundis	2 episodes	
2024–present	X-Men '97	Jean Grey / Marvel Girl / Phoenix, Madelyne Pryor, additional voices	15 episodes	

=== Feature films ===
List of voice performances in feature film
Year	Title	Role	Notes	Ref(s)
2002	The Powerpuff Girls Movie	Ms. Keane		
2010	Totally Spies! The Movie	Sam, Mandy		
2012	Paranormal Activity 4	Unknown	In the cast of voice over actors	
2018	Ralph Breaks the Internet	Cinderella		
2019	Star Wars: The Rise of Skywalker	Aayla Secura		
2023	Once Upon a Studio	Cinderella (also providing her singing voice)	Short film	

=== Direct-to-video and television films ===
List of voice performances in direct-to-video and television films
Year	Title	Role	Notes	Source
1994	Scooby-Doo! in Arabian Nights	Aliyah-din		
1995	Mortal Kombat: The Journey Begins	Sonya Blade		
1996	Bruno the Kid: The Animated Movie	Leecy Davidson		
1999	Scooby-Doo! and the Witch's Ghost	Thorn (Sally McKnight)		
2000	Sinbad: Beyond the Veil of Mists	Princess Serena		
2000	Scooby-Doo and the Alien Invaders	Dottie		
2001	Cowboy Bebop: Knockin' on Heaven's Door	Electra Ovirowa	English dub	
2001	Mickey's Magical Christmas: Snowed in at the House of Mouse	Cinderella		
2002	Cinderella II: Dreams Come True	Cinderella		
2003	Scooby-Doo! and the Legend of the Vampire	Thorn/Sally McKnight, Queen		
2003	The Powerpuff Girls: Twas the Fight Before Christmas	Ms. Keane, Princess Morbucks		
2006	Codename: Kids Next Door: Operation: Z.E.R.O.	Numbuh 86, Sector Z Operative, Computer, others		
2007	Cinderella III: A Twist in Time	Cinderella		
2007	Billy & Mandy's Big Boogey Adventure	Gladys (Billy's Mom)		
2007	Wrath of the Spider Queen	Gladysaur		
2008	Naruto the Movie: Legend of the Stone of Gelel	Kamira	English dub	
2008	The Little Mermaid: Ariel's Beginning	Alana		
2009	The Powerpuff Girls Rule!	Princess Morbucks	Tenth anniversary special	
2009	Superman/Batman: Public Enemies	Starfire		
2010	Kung Fu Magoo	Leslie Destructo, Agent L, Dutch Boy		
2011	Ben 10/Generator Rex: Heroes United	Black Knight		
2011	Kiss Me Again	Veronica	English dub	
2012	Superman vs. The Elite	Kid playing Superman		
2012	Sofia the First: Once Upon a Princess	Cinderella (also providing her singing voice)	Television movie	
2013	Metal Gear Solid: Digital Graphic Novel	Naomi Hunter	Digital graphic novel released as DVD video	
2013	Metal Gear Solid 2: Digital Graphic Novel	Emma Emmerich	Digital graphic novel released as DVD video	
2013	Justice League: The Flashpoint Paradox	Iris West		
2013	Monstrous Holiday	Science Teacher		
2014	Batman: Assault on Arkham	Killer Frost		
2015	Scooby-Doo! Moon Monster Madness	Shannon Lucas, Ridley, Launch Manager		
2017	Lego DC Super Hero Girls: Brain Drain	Mad Harriet		
2018	The Death of Superman	Martha Kent		
2019	Reign of the Supermen	Martha Kent, President Joan Dale (uncredited)		
2020	Lego DC Shazam! Magic and Monsters	Mary Batson, L. N. Ambassador		
2023	Legion of Super-Heroes	Alura		
2024	Justice League: Crisis on Infinite Earths	Alura, Hippolyta, Aya		

=== Video games ===
List of voice performances in video games
Year	Title	Role	Notes	Source
1994	Quest for Glory: Shadows of Darkness	Katrina		
1997	G-Nome	Computer Voice		
1997	Star Wars: X-Wing vs. TIE Fighter	Rebel Commander, Rebel Pilot #3		
1998	Die by the Sword	Maya		
1998	Metal Gear Solid	Naomi Hunter	Credited as Carren Learning; Also Integral, VR Missions expansion packs	
1998	Baldur's Gate	Dynaheir		
1999	Math Blaster	GC		
1999	Reading Blaster	G.C.		
1999	Gabriel Knight 3: Blood of the Sacred, Blood of the Damned	Madeline Buthane		
1999	Revenant	Andria, Harowen, Townwomen		
1999	Planescape: Torment	Fall-from-Grace, Deionarra		
2000	Alundra 2: A New Legend Begins	Ruby, Naomi, Rusty, Royal Girl B		
2000	Star Wars: Force Commander	Building Lifter Pilot, Scanner Jammer Driver, Rullian Prisoner #2		
2000	Ground Control	Sarah Parker, Squad & Dropship Voices		
2000	Spider-Man	Black Cat, Mary Jane Watson		
2000	Baldur's Gate II: Shadows of Amn	Mazzy Fentan		
2000	Orphen: Scion of Sorcery	Cleo, Quaris		
2000	Sacrifice	Persephone		
2000	Grandia II	Elena, Paella		
2000	Ground Control: Dark Conspiracy	Sarah Parker		
2001	Baldur's Gate II: Throne of Bhaal	Mazzy Fentan		
2001	The Mummy Returns	Anck-Sunamun, Meela		
2001	The Powerpuff Girls: Chemical X-traction	Princess Morbucks, Sedusa		
2001	Spider-Man 2: Enter Electro	Rogue, Dr. Watts, Computer 2		
2001	Metal Gear Solid 2: Sons of Liberty	Emma Emmerich	Also Substance re-release	
2001	Baldur's Gate: Dark Alliance	Lady Alyth Elendara		
2002	Powerpuff Girls: Relish Rampage	Miss Keane, Princess Morbucks, Sedusa, others		
2002	EOE: Eve of Extinction	Eliel Evergrand		
2002	Eternal Darkness: Sanity's Requiem	Alexandra Roivas, Xel'lotath		
2002	The Lord of the Rings: The Fellowship of the Ring	Galadriel, Lobelia		
2002	X-Men: Next Dimension	Rogue		
2002	Metroid Prime	Samus Aran		
2002	Star Trek: Starfleet Command III	Federation Officer #1		
2003	Freelancer	Commander Jun'ko Zane ('Juni')		
2003	X2: Wolverine's Revenge	Carol Hines, Rogue		
2003	Finding Nemo	Dory		
2003	RTX Red Rock	Colony Shrink		
2003	Arc the Lad: Twilight of the Spirits	Delma		
2003	Star Wars: Knights of the Old Republic	Bastila Shan		
2003	Lionheart: Legacy of the Crusader			
2003	P.N.03	Vanessa Z. Schneider, The Client		
2003	Star Wars Jedi Knight: Jedi Academy	Jaden Korr (Female)		
2003	Tak and the Power of Juju	Flora		
2003	The Hobbit	Lianna		
2004	Maximo vs. Army of Zin	Elizabet, White Lady		
2004	Wrath Unleashed	Helamis		
2004	Scooby Doo: Mystery Mayhem	Poltergeist, Computer, Shermantech Scientist		
2004	Metal Gear Solid: The Twin Snakes	Naomi Hunter		
2004	Samurai Jack: The Shadow of Aku	Kid, Lizard, Villager, Slave		
2004	Onimusha 3: Demon Siege	Michelle Aubert		
2004	La Pucelle: Tactics	Prier		
2004	Syphon Filter: The Omega Strain	Maggie Powers, Mara Aramov		Bend Studio. Syphon Filter The Omega Strain. Sony.
2004	Ground Control II: Operation Exodus	Major Sarah Parker		
2004	Tales of Symphonia	Sheena Fujibayashi		
2004	Catwoman	Patience Phillips / Catwoman	Uncredited (Note: The closing credits do not list the voice actors.)	
2004	Galleon	Faith		
2004	Shellshock: Nam '67	Nurses #1		
2004	The Bard's Tale	Additional voices		
2004	Tak 2: The Staff of Dreams	Flora		
2004	EverQuest II	Generic Racial Callouts		
2004	Metroid Prime 2: Echoes	Samus Aran	Uncredited (Note: Voice actors were not listed for this title.)	
2004	Star Wars: Knights of the Old Republic II – The Sith Lords	Bastila Shan		
2005	Mercenaries: Playground of Destruction	Jennifer Mui, News Correspondent #1, Pundit #1		Pandemic Studios. Mercenaries: Playground of Destruction. LucasArts.
2005	Shadow of Rome	Chamain, additional voices		
2005	Age of Empires 3	Elisabet Ramsey (Lizzie), additional voices		
2005	Xenosaga Episode II: Jenseits von Gut und Böse	Nigredo (child), Operator, U.M.N. Staff		
2005	Doom 3: Resurrection of Evil	Dr. Elizabeth McNeil		
2005	Ape Escape: On the Loose	Casi, Mother, Child		
2005	Samurai Western	Anne Barret, Child 1, Gunman 3		
2005	Killer7	Linda Vermillion		
2005	X-Men Legends II: Rise of Apocalypse	Scarlet Witch, Stepford Sisters		
2005	Ultimate Spider-Man	Silver Sable		
2005	Tak: The Great Juju Challenge	Flora		
2005	Darkwatch: Curse of the West	Cassidy Sharp		
2005	The Matrix: Path of Neo	Trinity		
2005	SOCOM U.S. Navy SEALs: Fireteam Bravo	HQ		Zipper Interactive. SOCOM U.S. Navy SEALs: Fireteam Bravo. Sony Computer Entertainment.
2005	SOCOM 3 U.S. Navy SEALs	HQ		Zipper Interactive. SOCOM 3 U.S. Navy SEALs. Sony Computer Entertainment.
2005	Kingdom of Paradise	Xiux Yu, Ginritsu		
2005	Codename: Kids Next Door - Operation: V.I.D.E.O.G.A.M.E.	Numbuh 86, Computer		
2005	Neopets: The Darkest Faerie	Illusen, Vanity		
2006	Syphon Filter: Dark Mirror	Maggie Powers, Mara Aramov		
2006	The Da Vinci Code	Sophie Neveu		
2006	Bratz: Forever Diamondz	Phoebe, Siernna, Female Shopkeeper		
2006	Desperate Housewives: The Game	Tutorial		
2006	Justice League Heroes	Black Canary		
2006	SOCOM U.S. Navy SEALs: Fireteam Bravo 2	HQ		Zipper Interactive. SOCOM U.S. Navy SEALs: Fireteam Bravo 2. Sony Computer Entertainment.
2006	SOCOM U.S. Navy SEALs: Combined Assault	HQ		Zipper Interactive. SOCOM U.S. Navy SEALs: Combined Assault. Sony Computer Entertainment.
2006	Spider-Man: Battle for New York	Silver Sable		
2007	Metroid Prime 3: Corruption	Samus Aran	Uncredited (Note: Hale's role is not listed in the closing credits of this title.)	
2007	Spider-Man: Friend or Foe	Silver Sable		
2007	Syphon Filter: Logan's Shadow	Maggie Powers		
2007	Cars Mater-National Championship	Emma	Grouped under Featuring the Voice Talents of:	
2007	Mass Effect	Commander Shepard (female)	Also DLC in 2008	
2008	Metal Gear Solid 4: Guns of the Patriots	Naomi Hunter		
2008	WALL-E	—N/a	Grouped under Featuring the Voice Talents of:	
2008	Mercenaries 2: World in Flames	Jennifer Mui		Pandemic Studios. Mercenaries 2: World in Flames. Electronic Arts.
2008	SOCOM: Confrontation	Commando Announcer		
2008	Rise of the Argonauts	Alceme		
2009	FusionFall	Princess Morbucks		
2009	Star Wars: The Clone Wars - Republic Heroes	Aayla Secura		
2009	Brütal Legend	Ophelia		
2010	Mass Effect 2	Commander Shepard (female)	Nominated – 2010 Spike Video Game Award for Best Performance By A Human Female; Also DLC in 2011	
2010	No More Heroes 2: Desperate Struggle	Kimmy Howell, Alice Twilight		
2010	Clash of the Titans	Andromeda, Stygian Witches – Pemphredo		
2010	Kingdom Hearts Birth by Sleep	Cinderella, Aurora, others		
2010	Spider-Man: Shattered Dimensions	Silver Sable		
2010	The Lord of the Rings: Aragorn's Quest	Arwen Undomiel		
2010	God of War: Ghost of Sparta	Daughter of Death, Young Mother, Citizen #3, Citizen #4		
2011	Marvel vs. Capcom 3: Fate of Two Worlds	Phoenix		
2011	Bulletstorm	Trishka Novak		
2011	Knights Contract			
2011	Lego Star Wars III: The Clone Wars	Aayla Secura		
2011	SOCOM 4 U.S. Navy SEALs	HQ		
2011	Gears of War 3	Stranded Crew #8, Warehouse Stranded Leader, Faraday, Azura		
2011	Uncharted 3: Drake's Deception	Multiplayer Announcer		
2011	The Lord of the Rings: War in the North	Idonna Bellflower		
2011	Kinect Disneyland Adventures	Cinderella		
2011	Ultimate Marvel vs. Capcom 3	Phoenix		
2011	Star Wars: The Old Republic	Trooper Female, Master Satele Shan	Also expansion packs	
2012	Mass Effect 3	Commander Shepard (female)	Nominated – 2012 Spike Video Game Award for Best Performance By A Human Female; Also DLC in 2013	
2012	Kinect Star Wars	Mavra Zane		
2012	Diablo III	Leah		
2012	Infex	Danny	Interactive graphic novel	
2012	Guild Wars 2	Sylvari Female, Queen Jennah	Also in Guild Wars 2: Heart of Thorns expansion pack	
2012	Halo 4	Sarah Palmer		
2012	Call of Duty: Black Ops II	Pilot "Anderson", Dispatcher		
2012	PlayStation All-Stars Battle Royale	Nariko		
2013	God of War: Ascension	Alecto, Slave, Lysandra, Civilian		
2013	BioShock Infinite	Rosalind Lutece		
2013	Fuse	Naya Deveraux		
2013	The Last of Us	Voice Over Cast		
2013	Knack	Katrina, Chairwoman		
2013–15	République	Mireille Prideaux (The Mentor)		
2014	Broken Age	Mom		
2014	The Elder Scrolls Online	Lyris Titanborn		
2014	Lichdom: Battlemage	Dragon (female protagonist)	Grouped under Voice Actors	
2014	Dragon Age: Inquisition	Cremisius Aclassi		
2014	Disney Infinity 2.0: Marvel Super Heroes	Captain Marvel	Grouped under "Featuring the Voice Talents"	
2015	Code Name: S.T.E.A.M.	Katherine		
2015	Mortal Kombat X	Tanya		
2015	Disney Infinity 3.0	Dory	Grouped under "Featuring the Voice Talents"	
2015	Halo 5: Guardians	Sarah Palmer, Warzone Commander	Also motion capture performance	
2016	Masquerada: Songs and Shadows	Lucia Shuria		
2016	The Long Dark	Astrid Greenwood	Alpha testing released. Also Story Mode	
2016	World of Final Fantasy	Pellinore, Lusse Farna		
2017	For Honor	The Warden (F)		
2017	Horizon Zero Dawn	Kopilai, Lauvuk		
2018	Overwatch	Elizabeth Caledonia "Calamity" Ashe	Revealed at BlizzCon 2018	
2018	Marvel Powers United VR	F.R.I.D.A.Y., Scientist Supreme		
2018	Lego DC Super-Villains	Killer Frost, Star Sapphire, Zatanna		
2019	Mortal Kombat 11	Kronika		
2019	Marvel Ultimate Alliance 3: The Black Order	Phoenix	Rise of the Phoenix expansion	
2020	Marvel's Avengers	Maria Hill		
2020	Iron Man VR	Pepper Potts		
2021	Ratchet & Clank: Rift Apart	Rivet	Nominated – British Academy Games Award for Performer in a Leading Role	
2021	No More Heroes III	Juvenile, Kimmy Howell		
2022	Return to Monkey Island	Queen Odina		
2022	Bayonetta 3	Bayonetta, Rosa	Replacing Hellena Taylor due to pay dispute	
2022	Marvel's Midnight Suns	Lilith, Nest Mother		
2023	Bayonetta Origins: Cereza and the Lost Demon	Rosa		
2023	Synapse	Handler Clara Sorensen		
2023	Mortal Kombat 1	Damashi/Titan Shang Tsung's disguise		
2024	Batman: Arkham Shadow	Alexandra Brackett		
2025	Marvel Cosmic Invasion	Jean Grey, Hela		
2025	Disney Speedstorm	Cinderella	Grouped under "Featuring the Voice Talents"	
2026	Overwatch (2023)	Jetpack Cat		

=== Other voice roles ===
List of voice performances
Year	Title	Role	Notes	Source
2004	Stitch's Great Escape!	Cinderella	Disney theme park ride	
2007	Finding Nemo Submarine Voyage	Dory	Disney theme park ride	
2012	Marvel Super Heroes 4D	Ms. Marvel / Carol Danvers		
2020	To Sleep in a Sea of Stars by Christopher Paolini	Narrator	Audiobook	
2021	Overwatch: Deadlock Rebels by Lyndsay Ely	Narrator	Audiobook	
2023	Fractal Noise by Christopher Paolini	Narrator	Audiobook	

== Live-action filmography ==
List of live-action performances in film and television
Year	Title	Role	Notes	Source
1988	A Father's Homecoming		First major acting role	
1989	Traveling Man	Joey		
1991	In the Line of Duty: Manhunt in the Dakotas	Mary Ann Kahl		
1992	Love Potion No. 9	Catty Woman		
1993	Camp Wilder	Lisa	Episode: "Love Stinks"	
1995	Gold Diggers: The Secret of Bear Mountain	Voice of Adult Beth	Credited as Carren Learning	
1997	ER	Gloria	Episode: "Tribes"	
1997	USA High	Mrs. Gower	Episode: "Baby Boom"	
1998	Unhappily Ever After	Kobe	Episode: "A Movie Show"	
1998	Saved by the Bell: The New Class	Sue	Episode: "Win, Lose or Cheat"	
1998	Melrose Place	Executive #1	Episode: "The Rumor Whisperer"	
1999	Charmed	Carpool Neighbor	Episode: "Morality Bites"	
2001	Shrinking Violet	Raven Wells	TV pilot	
2008	The Big Bang Theory	News announcer	Episode: "The Lizard-Spock Expansion"	
2009	Two and a Half Men	TV Announcer (V.O.)	Episode: "My Son's Enormous Head"	
2013	I Know That Voice	Herself	Documentary film on voice acting	
2014	Wolves	Janice Richards		
2015	Shameless	Karen's Mom	Episode: "Crazy Love"	
2024	The Thundermans Return	Thunder Moniter (V.O.)		
2025-present	The Thundermans: Undercover	Thunder Moniter (V.O.)		
2026	Clash of the Thundermans	Thunder Moniter (V.O.)		
