= Paul Mercier (actor) =

American actor

- Born: United States
- Occupations: Actor; voice actor
- Years active: 1990–present
- Spouse: Paula Tiso
- Website: paulmercier.com

Paul Mercier is an American actor and voice actor. He is best known for voicing Leon S. Kennedy in Resident Evil 4 (2005) and Specter in the SOCOM U.S. Navy SEALs video game series.

== Career ==
Mercier decided to pursue acting his senior year in high school, while playing Tevye in Fiddler on the Roof. After working for a touring company and other theaters in the Washington, D.C. area, he enrolled in Adelphi University in 1980. Mercier also trained for three years at the Royal Shakespeare Company at the Guildhall School of Music and Drama.

Mercier moved to California where he gained Screen Actors Guild credentials.

== Roles ==
=== Animation ===
- The Legend of Prince Valiant
- The Real Adventures of Jonny Quest – Diver #2 / Technician
- What a Cartoon! – Dad / Talking Dog

=== Anime ===
- .hack//Sign – Bear
- Burn-Up Excess – Chiimama
- Ghost in the Shell: Stand Alone Complex – Fake Laughing Man / additional voices
- Pokémon Horizons: The Series – Hamber
- Vampire Princess Miyu – Genji / Old Man / Village Chief

=== Films ===
- Call of Duty: Operation Kingfish – Sergeant Derek "Frost" Westbrook (uncredited)
- Growing Up Tiny: Kenadie's Next Chapter – Narrator
- Resident Evil: Degeneration – Leon S. Kennedy
- Wrestling with God – Alexander Campbell

=== Live action television ===
- FBI: The Untold Stories
- Nazi Hunters – Narrator
- Who's the Boss? – Announcer

=== Video games ===
- .hack//Mutation – Bear
- .hack//Outbreak – Bear
- .hack//Quarantine – Bear
- Ace Combat: Assault Horizon – Lieutenant Colonel William Bishop
- Age of Conan: Rise of the Godslayer – General Sheng
- Age of Mythology: The Titans (2003) - Kastor
- Alone in the Dark - Jeremy Hartwood
- Call of Duty: World at War – Private Miller
- Call of Duty: Advanced Warfare – Additional Voices
- Battle Realms – Kenji
- Command & Conquer: Generals
- Command & Conquer: Generals – Zero Hour
- God of War II – Translator 2
- Infamous 2 – Cops / Militia / Rebels
- Infamous 2: Festival of Blood – Male Pedestrians
- Onimusha 3: Demon Siege – Jacques Blanc
- Metal Gear Solid: Portable Ops – USSR Soldier A
- Nox – Quartermaster / Aidan / Henrick / Necromancer 2 / Mineworker 5
- No More Heroes III – Black Night Direction / Paradox Bandit
- Prince of Persia – Additional voices
- Resident Evil 4 – Leon S. Kennedy / Merchant
- Resident Evil: The Darkside Chronicles – Leon S. Kennedy
- Resistance: Fall of Man
- Saints Row: The Third – Additional voices
- Saints Row IV – The Voices of Virtual Steelport
- Shadows of the Damned – Fleming / Demons
- Shout About TV – Voice-over
- SOCOM II U.S. Navy SEALs – Specter
- SOCOM 3 U.S. Navy SEALs – Specter
- SOCOM U.S. Navy SEALs: Combined Assault – Specter
- SOCOM U.S. Navy SEALs: Confrontation – U.S. Navy SEAL 3
- Star Trek: Starfleet Command III – Federation Officer #2
- Starhawk – Rifters
- Skylanders: Swap Force
- The Lord of the Rings: Conquest – Faramir / Evil Human Officer #3 / Gondorian Officer #3
- The Lord of the Rings: The Battle for Middle-Earth – Uruk-hai
- The Lord of the Rings: The Battle for Middle-Earth II – Uruk-hai
- The Lord of the Rings: The War of the Ring
- The Rise of the Argonauts
- Transformers: Dark of the Moon – Additional voices
