= Greg Ellis (actor) =

British actor (born 1968)

- Born: Jonathan Rees; 21 March 1968 (age 58); Wigan, Lancashire, England
- Occupation: Actor
- Years active: 1988–present
- Children: 2
- Website: realgregellis.com

Jonathan Rees (born 21 March 1968), known professionally as Greg Ellis, is an English actor who has worked in film, television, video games, and theatre.

He is known for playing Chief Engineer Olson in Star Trek (2009), Theodore Groves in Disney's Pirates of the Caribbean (2003, 2007–2011), and Trevor Wilcox in Touch (2013), as well as voice roles such as Anders in Dragon Age: Origins – Awakening (2010), Cullen in multiple Dragon Age games, and Jet-Vac in the Skylanders video game series, as well as in the series Skylanders Academy.

== Career ==
=== Film and television ===
In film, Ellis is known for appearing in Titanic as well as in Mr. and Mrs. Smith. He is also known for appearing in Star Trek as Chief Engineer Olsen, the original chief engineer of the Starship Enterprise. He starred in the western Forsaken.

Ellis is best known for his portrayal of Lieutenant (later Lieutenant Commander) Theodore Groves in the Pirates of the Caribbean franchise. Due to his involvement in the franchise, Ellis kept in touch with Johnny Depp, Geoffrey Rush, and Kevin McNally.

On television, Ellis joined the cast of Hawaii Five-0 in season five to play Thomas Farrow in a major recurring arc. He was also a regular on the Fox drama Touch as Trevor Wilcox and played the villainous Michael Amador in the 3rd season of the series 24. His other television credits include: Dexter, The X-Files, Magnum PI, The Riches, Bones, Alcatraz, Star Trek: Deep Space Nine, The Closer, CSI, Nip/Tuck, Perception, Knight Rider, Days of Our Lives, and Trust Me.

=== Voice-over ===
As a voice-over actor, Ellis has a career in video games and animation. His voice was featured in the PlayStation 2 games Rogue Galaxy (as Simon Wicard), Dirge of Cerberus: Final Fantasy VII (as Cait Sith), and Tomb Raider: Legend (as Alister Fletcher), as well as in Dragon Age: Origins, Dragon Age II, and Dragon Age: Inquisition (as Cullen Rutherford). His minor video game work includes voices for SOCOM II U.S. Navy SEALs, SOCOM 3 U.S. Navy SEALs, Star Wars: Knights of the Old Republic II: The Sith Lords, Tomb Raider: Underworld, and Ty the Tasmanian Tiger. He has also voiced characters in animated series such as The Grim Adventures of Billy & Mandy, Invader Zim, Batman: The Brave and the Bold, and first three series of the Ben 10 franchise. He voiced Dr. Morocco in season two of Transformers: Rescue Bots, with the character originally being voiced by Tim Curry. He has voiced Mzingo in the Disney series The Lion Guard, Jet-Vac in the Netflix animated series Skylanders Academy, and Valen Rudor in the Disney animated series Star Wars Rebels.

Ellis played Cmdr. Giles Price in the game Command & Conquer: Red Alert 3 and reprised the role in Command & Conquer: Red Alert 3 – Uprising. He reprised his role as Cait Sith in the English version of the CGI film Final Fantasy VII: Advent Children. He voiced Garmund in the Robert Zemeckis animated film Beowulf. Ellis originally started in musicals and originated the role of Rusty in Starlight Express at the Apollo Victoria Theatre and was the alternate Chris in the original cast of Miss Saigon at the Theatre Royal, Drury Lane. He also appears on the cast recording of the new Starlight Express. He released a single from the show, "Next Time You Fall in Love."

His most recent work is the 2023 video game Hogwarts Legacy, as Albie Weekes and Timothy Teasdale.

=== Author ===
Ellis authored a 2021 book titled The Respondent: Exposing the Cartel of Family Law, which presents a first-person account of family breakdown and examines social, political, and legal factors related to what he describes as a national health issue.

== Filmography ==
=== Live-action roles ===
==== Film ====
List of live-action performances in film
Year	Title	Role	Notes
1997	Titanic	Carpathia Steward	
2001	To End All Wars	Primrose	
2003	Pirates of the Caribbean: The Curse of the Black Pearl	Officer Theodore Groves	Credited as "Officer"
2005	Mr. & Mrs. Smith	Mickey (Dive Bar Patron #1)	
2005	Cell Call	Donovan	Short film
2007	Pirates of the Caribbean: At World's End	Lieutenant Theodore Groves	Credited as "Officer"
2008	Knight Rider	Welther	Television film
2009	Star Trek	Chief Engineer Olsen	
2011	Pirates of the Caribbean: On Stranger Tides	Lieutenant Commander Theodore Groves	Credited as "Groves"
2012	Rogue	Peter Reid	Television film
2015	Forsaken	Tom Watson	
2017	Killer App	Springer	

==== Television ====
List of live-action performances in television
Year	Title	Role	Notes
1990	Brush Strokes	Terry	Episode: "Episode #4.5"
1990–1991	Bread	P.C. Lloyd	21 episodes
1998	The X-Files	3rd British Crewman	Episode: "Triangle"
1999	Star Trek: Deep Space Nine	Ekoor	Episode: "What You Leave Behind"
2003–2004	24	Michael Amador	9 episodes
2005, 2014	CSI: Crime Scene Investigation	Foxy Harris, Special Agent Sturgis	2 episodes
2006	Bones	Kevin Hollings	Episode: "Two Bodies in the Lab"
2008–2009	Valentine	Ari Valentine / Ares	8 episodes
2009	Trust Me	Simon Cochran	7 episodes
2009	CSI	Foxy Harris	1 Episode
2009	Dexter	Jonathan Farrow	Episode: "Slack Tide"
2010	Nip/Tuck	Adam Wise	Episode: "Joel Seabrook"
2011	The Confession	Sheldon Hoffman	Episode: "Chapter 7"
2012	Days of Our Lives	Agent Spencer	27 episodes
2012	Alcatraz	Garrett Stillman	Episode: "Garrett Stillman"
2013	Touch	Trevor Wilcox	13 episodes
2014	Hawaii Five-0	Thomas Farrow	4 episodes
2018	Lucifer	Myles Drunker	Episode: "Anything Pierce Can Do I Can Do Better"
2021	Magnum P.I.	Sean Cavendish	Episode: "A Fire in the Ashes"
2022	The Rookie	Blair Darvill	Episode: "Day in the Hole"

==== Video games ====
List of live-action performances in video games
Year	Title	Role	Notes
2008	Command & Conquer: Red Alert 3	Cmdr. Giles Price	
2009	Command & Conquer: Red Alert 3 – Uprising	Cmdr. Giles Price	
2008	Blur	Maaz	Unused cut scene

=== Voice roles ===
==== Animation ====
List of voice performances in television
Year	Title	Role	Notes
1999	The Wild Thornberrys	Bim	Episode: "Koality and Kuantity"
1999	The Angry Beavers	Randy Beaver, Supercomputer	Episode: "Koality Komforts/Oh, Brother?"
1999	Oh Yeah! Cartoons	Wizzy, Stan	Episode: "The Fairly OddParents: The Zappys"
2002	Dan Dare: Pilot of the Future	Dan Dare	
2004–07	The Grim Adventures of Billy & Mandy	Various voices	
2004–05	Teen Titans	Malchior, Punk Rocket	
2004	Evil Con Carne	Lady of the Lake, Prince, Bobby No. 2	Episode: "Jealousy, Jealous Do/Hector, King of the Britons"
2005–08	Bratz	Byron Powell, Sir Nigel Forrester	7 episodes
2006	Ben 10	Synaptak	Episode: "The Galactic Enforcers"
2006	Legion of Super Heroes	Drax	Episode: "Phantoms"
2007–08	Phineas and Ferb	Jameson, Angry Mob	
2007	The Batman	Count Vertigo	Episode: "Vertigo"
2008	Ben 10: Alien Force	Squire	Episode: "Be-Knighted"
2008–2011	Batman: The Brave and the Bold	Gentleman Ghost, Doctor Fate, Cavalier, Doctor Canus, Hawk, Shrapnel, Mister Mind, Big Head Batman	
2009	Star Wars: The Clone Wars	Turk Falso	2 episodes
2009	Ape Escape	Specter	
2010–11	Ben 10: Ultimate Alien	Prince Gyula, Cyborg #2, Dagonet, Reporter Chet Rigby	
2010–13	Generator Rex	Gatlocke	2 episodes
2010	G.I. Joe: Renegades	Breaker, Alvin Kibbey, Cobra Ops Supervisor	
2011–13	Scooby-Doo! Mystery Incorporated	Charles Weatlesby, Destroido Computer	
2011	Fish Hooks	Gecko #1, Gecko Glasses, Officiant, Duke	2 episodes
2012	The Avengers: Earth's Mightiest Heroes	Rocket Raccoon	Episode: "Michael Korvac"
2013–14	Beware the Batman	Phosphorus Rex	
2014–16	Transformers: Rescue Bots	Dr. Thaddeus Morocco, Mr. Foster	
2014–17	Star Wars Rebels	Baron Valen Rudor	
2015–17	Sofia the First	Spruce	
2015	Turbo Fast	Liam, Ollie	Episode: "Kicked Off"
2016–19	The Lion Guard	Mzingo	Credited as Jonny Rees
2016–18	Skylanders Academy	Jet-Vac	
2017	Be Cool, Scooby-Doo!	Dr. Messmer, Kitchen Staff Member	Episode: "Mysteries on the Disorient Express"
2017–18	Star vs. the Forces of Evil	Manfred, additional voices	Credited as Jonny Rees
2024	Angry Birds Mystery Island	Pig in Suit, Pig Student #3, Punk Rock Pig Sid	

==== Film ====
List of voice performances in live-action films
Year	Title	Role	Notes
2004	Summer Music Mania 2004	Announcer	Television film
2006	Garfield: A Tail of Two Kitties	Nigel	
2006	Bratz Genie Magic	Sebastian	
2007	Beowulf	Garmund	
2008	Dr. Dolittle: Tail to the Chief	Wallaby	Direct-to-video
2009	Dr. Dolittle: Million Dollar Mutts	Dave the Dove	Direct-to-video

List of voice performances in animated films
Year	Title	Role	Notes
2005	Bratz	Byron	Direct-to-video
2006	Bratz	Sebastian	Direct-to-video
2006	Final Fantasy VII: Advent Children	Cait Sith	English dub
2006	Bratz	Harvey	Direct-to-video
2007	Billy & Mandy's Big Boogey Adventure	Creeper, Horror's Hand	Television film
2010	Dante's Inferno: An Animated Epic	Plato	Direct-to-video
2010	Tom and Jerry Meet Sherlock Holmes	Tin, Sergeant	Direct-to-video
2012	Tom and Jerry: Robin Hood and His Merry Mouse	Will Scarlet, Tin	Direct-to-video
2012	Big Top Scooby-Doo!	Marius Brancusi	Direct-to-video
2012	Foodfight!	Hairy Hold	
2013	Tom and Jerry's Giant Adventure	Tin	Direct-to-video
2014	Batman: Assault on Arkham	Captain Boomerang	Direct-to-video
2014	Tom and Jerry: The Lost Dragon	Tin	Direct-to-video
2014	Khumba	Thabo, Elder #1	English dub
2015	Tom and Jerry: Spy Quest	Tin	Direct-to-video
2015	The Lion Guard: Return of the Roar	Mzingo	Television film
2020	Lego DC Shazam! Magic and Monsters	Mister Mind	Direct-to-video
2021	Scooby-Doo! The Sword and the Scoob	Herald, Herman Ellinger, British Passenger	Direct-to-video

==== Video games ====
List of voice performances in video games
Year	Title	Role	Notes
1999	Interstate '82	Rank Dick	
1999	Star Trek: Hidden Evil	Urano	
2000	Starlancer	Luenberg Comms Officer	
2000	Star Trek: Invasion	Kam Jahtae Commander	
2002	Red Faction II	Male Voice 4	
2002	Treasure Planet: Battle at Procyon	Human Male Crew, Arcturian Admiral, Captain	
2003	Lionheart	Richard Lionheart	
2003	SOCOM II U.S. Navy SEALs	British S.A.S. Operative SABRE	
2003	Medal of Honor: Rising Sun	Martin Clemens	
2003	Robin Hood: Defender of the Crown	Robin Hood	
2004	Onimusha Blade Warriors	Keijiro Maeda	English dub
2004	Call of Duty: United Offensive	British Narrator	
2004	X-Men Legends	Technician, Male Prisoner No. 2	
2004	Shark Tale	Additional Tenant Fish	
2004	Ty the Tasmanian Tiger 2: Bush Rescue	Ty the Tasmanian Tiger	
2004	The Bard's Tale	Additional voices	
2004	EverQuest II	Additional voices	
2004	Vampire: The Masquerade – Bloodlines	Additional voices	
2004	GoldenEye: Rogue Agent	Additional voices	
2004	Star Wars Knights of the Old Republic II: The Sith Lords	Mical	
2004	The Lord of the Rings: The Battle for Middle-earth	Elven Officer, Ithilien Ranger Unit	
2005	Shadow of Rome	Additional voices	
2005	Ys: The Ark of Napishtim	Romun Soldier No. 3	English dub
2005	Haunting Ground	Riccardo, Ugo Belli	
2005	Agatha Christie: And Then There Were None	Phillip Lombard	
2005	Bratz: Rock Angelz	Bryon Powell	
2005	Ty the Tasmanian Tiger 3: Night of the Quinkan	Ty the Tasmanian Tiger, Sergeant Bluey	
2005	The Incredibles: Rise of the Underminer	Additional voices	
2005	SOCOM 3 U.S. Navy SEALs	Chopper	
2006	The Lord of the Rings: The Battle for Middle-earth II	Celeborn, Elves, Ithilien Rangers	
2006	Tomb Raider: Legend	Alister Fletcher	
2006	Teen Titans	Mad Mod	
2006	Cars	Piston Cup Racers	
2006	Pirates of the Caribbean: Dead Man's Chest	Additional voices	
2006	Pirates of the Caribbean: The Legend of Jack Sparrow	Fat Pirate, Pintell, Ragetti, Spanish Soldier	
2006	Dirge of Cerberus: Final Fantasy VII	Cait Sith	English dub
2006	SOCOM U.S. Navy SEALs: Fireteam Bravo 2	Additional voices	
2006	The Lord of the Rings: The Battle for Middle-earth II: The Rise of the Witch-king	Elves, Ithilien Rangers	
2007	Rogue Galaxy	Simon Wicard	English dub
2007	God of War II	Rhodes Soldiers, Spartan Soldiers	
2007	Pirates of the Caribbean: At World's End	Additional voices	
2007	Ratchet & Clank Future: Tools of Destruction	Weapons Grummel, Armor Grummel	
2008	The Chronicles of Narnia: Prince Caspian	Reepicheep	
2008	Resistance 2	Additional voices	
2008	Tomb Raider: Underworld	Alister Fletcher, Mercenary	
2009	Ratchet & Clank Future: A Crack in Time	Weapons Grummel, Armor Grummel	
2009	Dragon Age: Origins	Cullen, additional voices	
2010	Clash of the Titans	Perseus, Soldiers, Townpeople, Spirits	
2010	God of War III	Hermes	
2010	Dragon Age: Origins – Awakening	Anders	
2010	Batman: The Brave and the Bold – The Videogame	Gentleman Ghost	
2011	Dragon Age II	Cullen, additional voices	
2011	Cars 2	Nigel Gearsley	
2011	Shadows of the Damned	Johnson	
2011	Resistance 3	Fyodor Malikov	
2011	Uncharted 3: Drake's Deception	Marlowe's Agents	
2011	Saints Row: The Third	Additional voices	
2011	Ultimate Marvel vs. Capcom 3	Rocket Raccoon	
2011	Star Wars: The Old Republic	Additional voices	
2012	Kingdoms of Amalur: Reckoning	Additional voices	
2012	Diablo III	Captain Rumford	
2012	Darksiders II	Corrupted Angel	
2012	Skylanders: Giants	Jet-Vac	
2013	BioShock Infinite	Additional voices	
2013	Disney Infinity	Additional voices	
2013	Saints Row IV	Additional voices	
2013	Skylanders: Swap Force	Jet-Vac	
2014	Diablo III: Reaper of Souls	Captain Rumford	
2014	Skylanders: Trap Team	Jet-Vac, Bomb Shell	
2014	Dragon Age: Inquisition	Cullen	
2015	Metal Gear Solid V: The Phantom Pain	Soldiers	English dub
2015	Skylanders: SuperChargers	Jet-Vac	
2016	Skylanders: Imaginators	Jet-Vac	
2019	Travis Strikes Again: No More Heroes	Brian Buster Jr.	
2023	Hogwarts Legacy	Albie Weekes, Timothy Teasdale, various voices	
