= Satellite Award for Interactive Media =

International press and media awards

The International Press Academy honored interactive products and interactive media features in the late 1990s and early 2000s with an annual Satellite Award.

== Winners and nominees ==
=== Best Home Entertainment Product ===
Year	Category	Winners and nominees	Developer/Publisher
1997	Game	Super Mario 64	Nintendo EAD / Nintendo
1997	Game	Tekken 2	Namco / Namco Hometek
1997	Game	Nights	Sonic Team / Sega
1997	Game	John Madden Football 1996	EA Tiburon / EA Sports
1997	Game	Die Hard Trilogy	Probe Entertainment / Fox Interactive
1999	Game	Dilbert's Desktop Games	Cyclops Software / DreamWorks Interactive
1999	Game	Gran Turismo	Polys Entertainment / Sony Computer Entertainment
1999	Game	Half-Life	Valve / Sierra Studios
1999	Game	Madden NFL 99	EA Tiburon / EA Sports
1999	Game	NBA Live 99	EA Canada / EA Sports
2000	Kids & Family	Pokémon Game	Bandai Namco Entertainment / Nintendo
2000	Kids & Family	The King and I Interactive Game	N/A
2000	Kids & Family	Toy Story 2 Game	Traveller's Tales / Activision
2000	Kids & Family	Disney Princess Fashion Boutique	N/A
2000	Kids & Family	Walt Disney World Explorer	Disney Interactive Studios / Disney Interactive

=== Best Interactive Product ===
Year	Category	Winners and nominees	Developer/Publisher
1997	CD-ROM; Educational – Children	101 Dalmatians Storybook	Disney Interactive
1997	CD-ROM; Educational – Children	Freddi Fish 2: The Case of the Haunted Schoolhouse	Humongous Entertainment
1997	CD-ROM; Educational – Children	Living Books: Sheila Rae, The Brave	Wanderful interactive storybooks
1997	CD-ROM; Educational – Children	The Simpsons: Cartoon Studio	Big Top Productions / Fox Interactive
1997	CD-ROM; Educational – Children	Snoopy's Campfire Stories	Virgin Sound & Vision
1997	CD-ROM; Entertainment	Cinemania 97	Microsoft
1997	CD-ROM; Entertainment	Encarta 97 – Encyclopedia Deluxe	Microsoft
1997	CD-ROM; Entertainment	Eyewitness Encyclopedia of Space and the Universe	DK
1997	CD-ROM; Entertainment	Inside Independence Day	Fox Interactive
1997	CD-ROM; Entertainment	Leonardo da Vinci	Coris Publishing
1997	CD-ROM; Game	Monty Python & the Quest for the Holy Grail	7th Level / Panasonic
1997	CD-ROM; Game	Descent II	Parallax Software / Interplay Productions
1997	CD-ROM; Game	Goosebumps	DreamWorks Interactive
1997	CD-ROM; Game	Quake	id Software / GT Interactive
1997	CD-ROM; Game	Warcraft II: Beyond the Dark Portal	Cyberlore Studios / Blizzard Entertainment
1998	CD-ROM; Entertainment	Blade Runner	Westwood Studios / Virgin Interactive
1998	CD-ROM; Entertainment	Hercules	Eurocom / Disney Interactive Software
1999	CD-ROM; Entertainment	Big Brother	Media X
1999	CD-ROM; Entertainment	Baldur's Gate	BioWare / Black Isle Studios, Interplay Entertainment
1999	CD-ROM; Entertainment	Heretic II	Raven Software, Loki Software, Hyperion Entertainment / Activision
1999	CD-ROM; Entertainment	Rainbow Six	Ubisoft, Red Storm Entertainment / Ubisoft
1999	CD-ROM; Entertainment	Unreal	Epic MegaGames, Digital Extremes, Legend Entertainment / GT Interactive
2000	CD-ROM; Game	NBA Pro Basketball	Konami
2000	CD-ROM; Game	Duke Nukem: Time to Kill, Duke Nukem: Total Meltdown, and Duke Nukem 3D; For the Duke Nukem series.	3D Realms / GT Interactive
2000	CD-ROM; Game	MechWarrior 3	Zipper Interactive / MicroProse
2000	CD-ROM; Game	Star Wars Jedi Knight: Dark Forces II	LucasArts / LucasArts
2000	CD-ROM; Game	Doom II: Hell on Earth	id Software / GT Interactive
2000	CD-ROM; Industry	Interact Media Solution	
2000	CD-ROM; Industry	Final Draft 5.0	Final Draft
2000	CD-ROM; Industry	Quicken 2000	Quicken
2000	CD-ROM; Industry	Final Cut Pro	Apple
2001	Computer; Educational	Family Tree Maker 8.0 Deluxe	Ancestry.com
2001	Computer; Educational	Acid DJ 2.0	Sony Creative Software
2001	Computer; Educational	Barbie Magic Genie Bottle	Vicarious Visions / Mattel Interactive
2001	Computer; Educational	Nancy Drew: Message in a Haunted Mansion	Her Interactive / DreamCatcher
2001	Computer; Software	Adobe Photoshop 6.0	Adobe Systems
2001	Computer; Software	Giants: Citizen Kabuto	Planet Moon Studios / Interplay Entertainment
2001	Computer; Software	Mechanical Warrior IV	FASA Interactive / Microsoft
2001	Computer; Software	The Sims	Maxis / Electronic Arts
2001	Computer; Software	Tomb Raider: Chronicles	Core Design / Eidos Interactive
2001	Video Game	Perfect Dark	Rare / Rare, Nintendo
2001	Video Game	FIFA 2001 Major League Soccer	EA Sports / Electronic Arts
2001	Video Game	Final Fantasy IX	Square / Square Enix
2001	Video Game	007: The World Is Not Enough	Eurocom / Electronic Arts
2001	Video Game	Quake II	id Software / Activision
2002	Video Game	Final Fantasy VIII	Square
2002	Video Game	Command & Conquer: Red Alert 2	Westwood Pacific / Electronic Arts
2002	Video Game	Myst, Riven: The Sequel to Myst, and Myst III: Exile; For the Myst series.	Cyan Worlds, Presto Studios / Broderbund, Red Orb Entertainment, Ubisoft
2002	Video Game	Tony Hawk's Pro Skater 2	Neversoft / Activision
2002	Video Game	Quake III: Arena	id Software / Activision
2002	Computer; Software	Final Cut Pro 2.0	Apple
2002	Computer; Software	Avid Xpress DV	Avid
2002	Computer; Software	Premiere 6.0	Adobe Systems
2002	Computer; Software	Macromedia Flash 5.0	Macromedia
2002	Computer; Software	Final Draft 5.0	Final Draft

=== Outstanding Feature – Interactive Media ===
Year	Category	Winners and nominees	Developer/Publisher
2003	Outstanding Art Direction	Biohazard Ø	Capcom
2003	Outstanding Art Direction	Grand Theft Auto: Vice City	Rockstar North / Rockstar Games
2003	Outstanding Art Direction	Jet Set Radio Future	Smilebit / Sega
2003	Outstanding Art Direction	Pro Surfer	Beenox / Aspyr
2003	Outstanding Art Direction	Mafia: The City of Lost Heaven	Illusion Softworks / Gathering of Developers
2003	Outstanding Character	Shinobi; For "Shinobi".	Overworks / Sega
2003	Outstanding Character	Maximo: Ghosts to Glory; For "Maximo".	Capcom
2003	Outstanding Character	Ratchet & Clank; For "Ratchet".	Insomniac Games / Sony Computer Entertainment
2003	Outstanding Character	Sly Cooper and the Thievius Raccoonus; For "Sly Cooper".	Sucker Punch Productions / Sony Computer Entertainment
2003	Outstanding Character	Spider-Man; For "Spiderman".	Treyarch / Activision
2003	Outstanding Execution of a Gaming Concept (Game of the Year)	No One Lives Forever 2: A Spy in H.A.R.M.'s Way	Monolith Productions / Sierra Entertainment
2003	Outstanding Execution of a Gaming Concept (Game of the Year)	Eternal Darkness: Sanity's Requiem	Silicon Knights / Nintendo
2003	Outstanding Execution of a Gaming Concept (Game of the Year)	Mafia: The City of Lost Heaven	Illusion Softworks / Gathering of Developers
2003	Outstanding Execution of a Gaming Concept (Game of the Year)	Metroid Prime	Retro Studios / Nintendo
2003	Outstanding Execution of a Gaming Concept (Game of the Year)	The Sims Online	Maxis / Electronic Arts
2003	Most Innovative Story Design	Eternal Darkness: Sanity's Requiem	Silicon Knights / Nintendo
2003	Most Innovative Story Design	Grand Theft Auto: Vice City	Rockstar North / Rockstar Games
2003	Most Innovative Story Design	Medal of Honor: Frontline	DreamWorks Interactive / Electronic Arts
2003	Most Innovative Story Design	Metal Gear Solid 2: Substance	Konami
2003	Most Innovative Story Design	Warcraft III: Reign of Chaos	Blizzard Entertainment
2004	Outstanding Art Direction	The Lord of the Rings: The Return of the King	EA Redwood Shores/ Electronic Arts
2004	Outstanding Art Direction	Battlefield 1942; For the add-on "The Road to Rome".	Electronic Arts / Electronic Arts
2004	Outstanding Art Direction	Final Fantasy XI	Square Enix / Sony Computer Entertainment
2004	Outstanding Art Direction	Max Payne 2: The Fall of Max Payne	Remedy Entertainment / Rockstar Games
2004	Outstanding Art Direction	SOCOM II U.S. Navy SEALs	Zipper Interactive / Sony Computer Entertainment
2004	Outstanding Character	Grand Theft Auto: Vice City; For "Tommy Vercetti" (Ray Liotta).	Rockstar North / Rockstar Games
2004	Outstanding Character	Def Jam Vendetta; For "Def Jam Crew" ('DMX'/Ludacris/Method Man/Redman).	Electronic Arts / Electronic Arts
2004	Outstanding Character	True Crime: Streets of LA; For "Unknown" (Snoop Dogg).	Luxoflux, LTI Gray Matter / Activision
2004	Outstanding Character	XIII; For the XIII Voice (David Duchovny)	Ubisoft / Ubisoft
2004	Outstanding Execution of a Gaming Concept (Game of the Year)	Star Wars: Knights of the Old Republic	BioWare / LucasArts
2004	Outstanding Execution of a Gaming Concept (Game of the Year)	Call of Duty	Infinity Ward / Activision
2004	Outstanding Execution of a Gaming Concept (Game of the Year)	Enter the Matrix	Shiny Entertainment / Infogrames Entertainment
2004	Outstanding Execution of a Gaming Concept (Game of the Year)	Max Payne 2: The Fall of Max Payne	Remedy Entertainment / Rockstar Games
2004	Outstanding Execution of a Gaming Concept (Game of the Year)	SOCOM II U.S. Navy SEALs	Zipper Interactive / Sony Computer Entertainment
2004	Outstanding Execution of a Gaming Concept (Game of the Year)	The Lord of the Rings: The Return of the King	EA Redwood Shores / Electronic Arts
2004	Most Innovative Story Design	XIII	Ubisoft / Ubisoft
2004	Most Innovative Story Design	PlanetSide	Sony Online Entertainment / Sony Online Entertainment, Ubisoft
2004	Most Innovative Story Design	Star Wars: Knights of the Old Republic	BioWare / LucasArts
2004	Most Innovative Story Design	The Sims: Superstar	Maxis / Electronic Arts
2004	Most Innovative Story Design	True Crime: Streets of LA	Luxoflux, LTI Gray Matter / Activision
