= Jason Spisak =

American actor, producer, and computer programmer

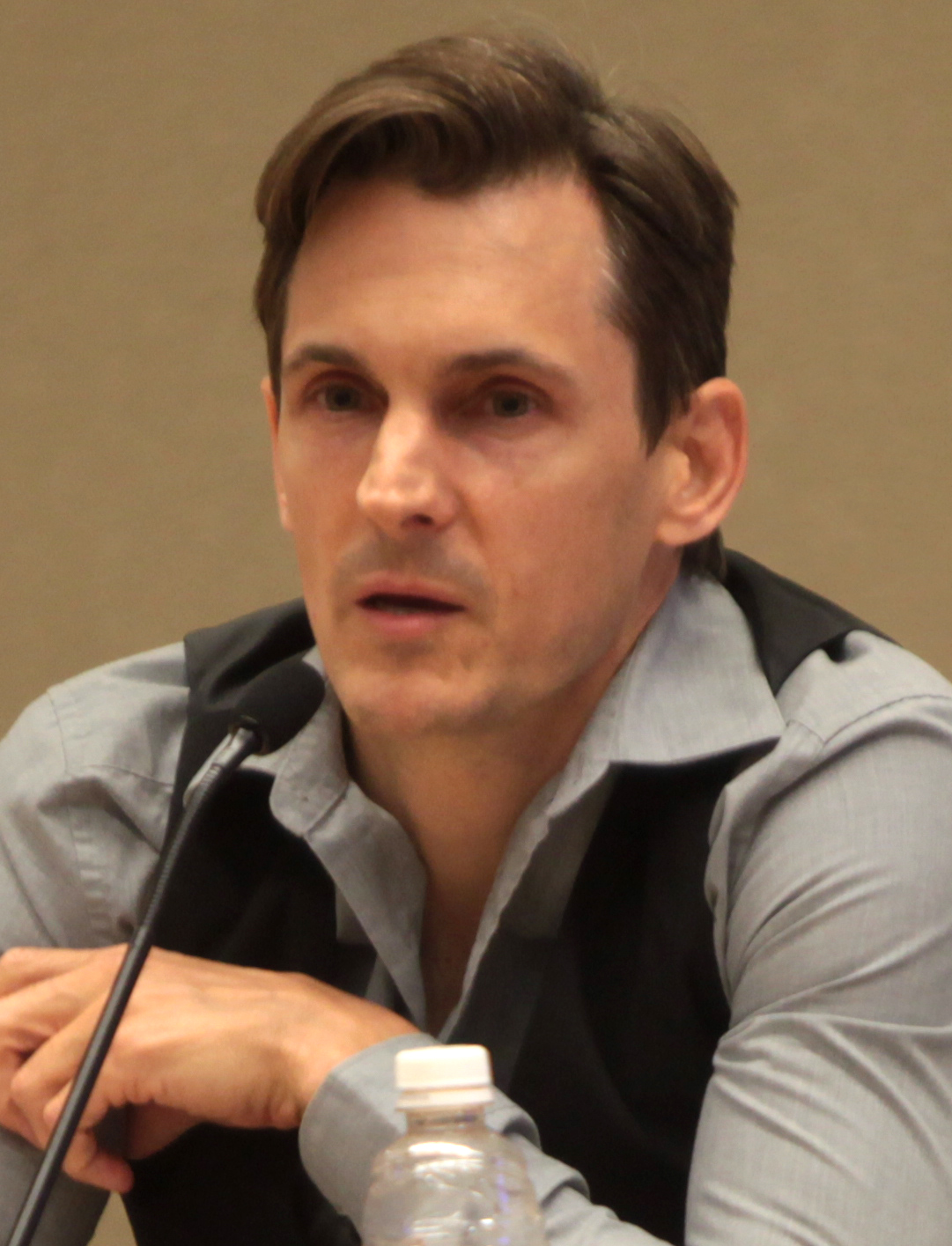
- Spisak at the 2014 Phoenix Comicon
- Born: Wilkes-Barre, Pennsylvania, U.S.
- Occupations: Actor; producer; computer programmer
- Years active: 1994–present
- Children: 2

Jason Spisak (/ˈspiːzæk/) is an American actor, producer, and computer programmer. He is also the co-leader of the Symphony OS Project and the designer of Symphony's unique Mezzo desktop environment and wrote the Laws of Interface Design, to which the project tries to adhere in its designs. He was previously a co-founder of Lycoris.

== Filmography ==
=== Voice over roles ===
==== Animation ====
List of voice performances in animation
Year	Series	Role	Notes	Source
1999–2004	Rocket Power	Pi Piston, Sputz Ringley, additional voices		
2004	All Grown Up!	Dude #2, Guy	Episode: "Bad Aptitude"	
2005	The Grim Adventures of Billy & Mandy	Wolfman, Goblin	Episode: "Home of the Ancients"	
2006–2007	Squirrel Boy	Oscar, various characters		
2007	Ben 10	Gatorboy	Episode: "Ready to Rumble"	
2010	Phineas and Ferb	Additional voices	Episode: "The Secret of Success/The Doof Side of the Moon"	
2010–2012	Star Wars: The Clone Wars	Lux Bonteri, Christo, Zinn Paulness		
2010–2013, 2019–2022	Young Justice	Wally West / Kid Flash / Doctor Fate, Forager, Razer, additional voices		
2011–2013	Green Lantern: The Animated Series	Razer		
2013–2016	Avengers Assemble	Justin Hammer, Super-Adaptoid, Speed Demon		
2015	Lego Scooby-Doo: Knight Time Terror	Kyle	Television special	
2015–2018	Guardians of the Galaxy	Grandmaster, additional voices		
2016	Transformers: Robots in Disguise	Paralon	2 episodes	
2016–2018	The Powerpuff Girls	Silico, additional voices		
2017	Uncle Grandpa	Additional voices	Episode: "What's the Big Idea?"	
2017	Spider-Man	Alistair Smythe / Ultimate Spider-Slayer, Scorpion, additional voices		
2017	The Fixies: Top Secret	Fire	English dub	
2018	Screechers Wild	Jayhawk, Noah	English dub	
2018	Wacky Races	Patty O'Patty	Episode: "Under the Rainbow"	
2019	DC Super Hero Girls	Hal Jordan / Green Lantern, Kilowog, Shaggy Man, additional voices		
2021–2024	Arcane	Silco, Pim		
2021	Teen Titans Go!	The Joker	Episode: "Pig in a Poke"	

==== Anime ====
List of dubbing performances in anime
Year	Series	Role	Notes	Source
1995–1996	Saint Tail	Sawatari, additional voices		
1998–2014	Initial D	Kenji		
2000	Dinozaurs	Kaito	Episode: "Welcome Back Theo"	
2001–2002	Transformers: Robots in Disguise	Koji		
2003	s-CRY-ed	Ryuho		
2005–2006	Zatch Bell!	Kiyo Takamine		
2014	Marvel Disk Wars: The Avengers	Deadpool		
2017	Marvel Future Avengers	Deadpool		
2021	Pacific Rim: The Black	Ford Travis		
2021	Blade Runner: Black Lotus	Hooper		

==== Film ====
List of voice and dubbing performances in film
Year	Title	Role	Notes	Source
2005	Digimon: Revenge of Diaboromon	Tai Kamiya		
2013	Tiger & Bunny the Movie: The Beginning	Robin Baxter		
2014	JLA Adventures: Trapped in Time	The Flash, Taxi Driver	Direct-to-video	
2016	Batman: Bad Blood	Noah Kuttler / Calculator, Killer Moth	Direct-to-video	
2016	Lego DC Comics Super Heroes: Justice League – Cosmic Clash	Captain Fear	Direct-to-video	
2016	Lego DC Comics Super Heroes: Justice League – Gotham City Breakout	Joker, Grungle	Direct-to-video	
2016	Pup Star	Australian Shepherd	Direct-to-video	
2017	Teen Titans: The Judas Contract	Wally West / Kid Flash	Direct-to-video	
2018	Lego DC Comics Super Heroes: The Flash	Joker	Direct-to-video	
2018	Scooby-Doo! and the Gourmet Ghost	Bradley Bass	Direct-to-video	
2019	Batman: Hush	Joker	Direct-to-video	
2019	Lego DC Batman: Family Matters	Jason Todd / Red Hood	Direct-to-video	
2020	Superman: Red Son	Dimitri	Direct-to-video	
2024	Justice League: Crisis on Infinte Earths - Part Three	Razer, Hayseed	Direct-to-video	
2024	Watchmen	Doug Roth, John F. Kennedy, additional voices	Direct-to-video	

==== Video games ====
List of voice and dubbing performances in video games
Year	Title	Role	Notes	Source
2000	Vampire: The Masquerade – Redemption	Brother Maynard, Dev / Null, Mendel, Mercurio, Orvus		
2002	Rocket Power: Beach Bandits	Pi Piston		
2003	SOCOM II U.S. Navy SEALs	JESTER		
2004	Tony Hawk's Underground 2	Paulie "Wheels of Fury" Ryan		
2005	Xenosaga Episode II	Wilhelm, Hammer		
2005	Zatch Bell! Mamodo Battles	Kiyo Takamine, Mohawk Ace		
2005	SOCOM 3 U.S. Navy SEALs	JESTER		
2006	Dead Rising	Jack Hall		
2006	Xenosaga Episode III	Wilhelm, Hammer, Richard		
2006	Zatch Bell! Mamodo Fury	Kiyo Takamine, Mohawk Ace		
2006	SOCOM U.S. Navy SEALs: Combined Assault	JESTER		
2007	Rogue Galaxy	Seed		
2008	SOCOM U.S. Navy SEALs: Confrontation	U.S. Navy SEAL 1		
2009	Dissidia Final Fantasy	Bartz Klauser		
2010	Mafia II	Marty		
2010	Valkyria Chronicles II	Avan Hardins		
2010	Cabela's Dangerous Hunts 2011	Adrian Rainsford		
2010	Fallout New Vegas	Vulpes Inculta		
2011	Dissidia 012 Final Fantasy	Bartz Klauser		
2011	Operation Flashpoint: Red River	Marines		
2011	Resistance 3	Haven Residents		
2012	Final Fantasy XIII-2	Additional voices		
2012	Uncharted: Golden Abyss	Jason Dante		
2012	TERA	Castanic, Popori		
2012	Guild Wars 2	Ftokchak, Shadows Agent Kito		
2013	Ben 10: Omniverse 2	Incursean Tank Mech Toad		
2013	Young Justice: Legacy	Wally West / Kid Flash, Beast Boy, Riddler		
2014	Lightning Returns: Final Fantasy XIII	Bhakti, Man Awaiting the End		
2014	Middle-earth: Shadow of Mordor	Orcs		
2014	Teenage Mutant Ninja Turtles	Rat King		
2014	The Crew	Shiv		
2015	Final Fantasy Type-0 HD	Izana Kunagiri		
2015	Lego Jurassic World	Additional voices		
2015	Mad Max	Chumbucket		
2016	Lego Marvel's Avengers	Justin Hammer		
2016	Mighty No. 9	Dr. White		
2016	Lego Star Wars: The Force Awakens	Unkar's Goons		
2016	Batman: The Telltale Series	Oswald Cobblepot / The Penguin, Waiter		
2016	World of Final Fantasy	Bartz Klauser		
2016	Final Fantasy Explorers	Bartz Klauser		
2016	Final Fantasy XV	Loqi Tummelt		
2017	Middle-earth: Shadow of War	Nemesis Orcs		
2018	Dissidia Final Fantasy NT	Bartz Klauser		
2018	Marvel Powers United VR	Deadpool		
2018	Spider-Man	Mac Gargan / Scorpion		
2018	Lego DC Super-Villains	Brain		
2018	Darksiders III	Lust, Abbadon, Death, Angel Soldier, Human		
2019	Anthem	Karney, additional voices		
2019	Sekiro: Shadows Die Twice	Additional Character Performances		
2019	Rage 2	Klegg Clayton		
2019	Fortnite	Hybrid	Save the World mode	
2019	Days Gone	Raymond 'Skizzo' Sarkozi		
2019	Marvel Ultimate Alliance 3: The Black Order	Loki		
2020	Doom Eternal	Deag Ranak, Sentinel Priests		
2021	DC Super Hero Girls: Teen Power	Hal Jordan		
2021	Ratchet & Clank: Rift Apart	Goons-4-Less, Nefarious Troopers, additional voices		
2021	Call of Duty: Mobile	Gunzo		
2022	Tactics Ogre: Reborn	Vyce Bozeck, Hektor Didarro		
2023	Spider-Man 2	Mac Gargan / Scorpion		
2025	Guild Wars 2	Director Vloxx	Visions of Eternity expansion.	
2025	Dune Awakening	The Jackal, Desmond Mercer, Harkonnen Landsraad Quartermaster		
2026	Mega Man Star Force Legacy Collection	Geo Stelar		
2026	Marvel Tokon: Fighting Souls	Loki, Glob Herman	English dub	
2026	Marvel's Wolverine	Bolivar Trask		
2026	Star Wars: Zero Company	Luco Bronc		
TBA	Deadlock	Victor		

==== Audio dramas ====
Year	Title	Role	Notes
2025	DC High Volume: Batman	Bruce Wayne / Batman	Scripted podcast

=== Live action roles ===
==== Television ====
List of live-action performances in television
Year	Series	Role	Notes	Source
2010	NCIS	Aaron Szwed	Episode: "Jack Knife"	
2010	Lie to Me	Al	Episode: "Double Blind"	
2013	The Vampire Diaries	Voice of Silas	3 Episodes	
2015	Project Mc2	Reporter		

==== Film ====
List of live-action performances in film
Year	Title	Role	Notes	Source
2009	Locker 13	Skip		
2010	Piranha 3D	Deputy Taylor		
2011	Everything Must Go	Hipster		
2014	Time Lapse	Ivan		
2018	Baja	Burnout		
2020	Intersect	Ryan Winrich		
