= Recoil (video game) =

1999 video game

- Developer(s): Zipper Interactive; Westwood Studios
- Publisher(s): Electronic Arts
- Platform(s): Microsoft Windows
- Release: NA: March 11, 1999; UK: March 19, 1999
- Genre(s): Vehicular combat
- Mode(s): Single-player, multiplayer

Recoil is a vehicular combat tank-based Microsoft Windows video game. It involves the player piloting an experimental tank known as the "BFT" (Battle Force Tank) through various missions. There is a heavy influence on collecting various weapons for the BFT throughout the game. It was developed by Zipper Interactive, a subsidiary of its parent publisher, Electronic Arts, and uses the same game engine as MechWarrior 3.

== Plot ==
Tanks patrol desolate city streets. Turrets and missile sites threaten the skies. Robot warriors carrying pulse rifles surround military installations. What's become of Earth? Machines have taken over. Corporate greed and rapid technological advancements have made humans pawns of their own creations. During the first fifteen years of the 21st century, Mega Corp began to dominate computer technology in both peacekeeping and war-fighting applications. As this giant churned out better and better technology for manufacturing and warfare, humans were relegated to service industries or to working as drones on PC terminals. Mega Corp became the largest employer in the United States. By 2010, every computer in America used Mega Corp software and was Internet-connected and monitored through the Mega Corp Network—antitrust suits be damned. Each day, Mega Corp would issue government-endorsed messages through the Network that broadcast pro-machine propaganda. The country was becoming brainwashed. In 2018, the wonders of artificial intelligence turned ugly in the hands of a few disillusioned Mega Corp programmers. Frustrated at being a part of such an ethically challenged corporation, these hacks altered coding in various Mega Corp products—turning certain robot and tank machinery into self-directed, man-killing machines. Today, May 2019, in a war-torn, machine-ravaged world, only a few freethinkers remain. Only a few outsiders have escaped the spell of the Network. Dr. Raines is the leader of a group of rebels called the Alliance. He and a few others have developed a computer program that gives the operator control over an experimental tank. You control this tank and must defeat these robot warriors.

== Critical reception ==
Reception

Aggregate score
Aggregator	Score
GameRankings	66%

Review scores
Publication	Score
AllGame	4/5 stars
CNET Gamecenter	7/10
Computer Games Strategy Plus	2/5 stars
Computer Gaming World	3/5 stars
Game Informer	7.25/10
GamePro	3.5/5 stars
GameRevolution	C
GameSpot	6.4/10
IGN	8.3/10
Next Generation	3/5 stars
PC Accelerator	6/10
PC Gamer (US)	76%
The Cincinnati Enquirer	3/4 stars

In 1999 when Recoil was published, Zipper Interactive was a very little-known company. Due to the massive number of video games for PC being released at the time, Recoil was hardly seen at all. When it was, however, the game received average reviews according to the review aggregation website GameRankings. Next Generation said that the game's selling points "are of the fast and fiery variety, but due to its brevity, this blockbuster may ultimately be little more than a weekend diversion, which prevents us from giving it a higher score."
