= SOCOM 4 U.S. Navy SEALs =

2011 video game

- Developer: Zipper Interactive
- Publisher: Sony Computer Entertainment
- Director: Seth Luisi
- Producer: Tom Rigas
- Designer: Travis Steiner
- Programmer: Troy Mason
- Artist: Phil Knowles
- Writer: Rafael Chandler
- Composer: Bear McCreary
- Series: SOCOM U.S. Navy SEALs
- Platform: PlayStation 3
- Release: NA: April 19, 2011; PAL: April 21, 2011
- Genres: Third-person shooter, tactical shooter
- Modes: Single-player, multiplayer

SOCOM 4 U.S. Navy SEALs, known as SOCOM: Special Forces in PAL regions, is a 2011 tactical third-person shooter video game developed by Zipper Interactive and published by Sony Computer Entertainment for the PlayStation 3. It is the sequel to SOCOM U.S. Navy SEALs: Combined Assault and the final installment in the SOCOM U.S. Navy SEALs series.

Online multiplayer servers were shut down on January 28, 2014, along with the servers for SOCOM U.S. Navy SEALs: Confrontation.

== Plot ==
Set at an undisclosed date somewhere in Malaysia, NATO Operations Commander Cullen Gray arrives at a NATO operations command center at the request of Area Commander James Gorman. A rebel movement calling themselves "Naga" have rallied and taken up arms against the country's government, and have hijacked ships belonging to Clawhammer Security, a private military company that was featured in the previous SOCOM title, Fireteam Bravo 2. Weapons and supplies were seized by Naga rebels, while Clawhammer has decided to withdraw from the region before losing any more assets, limiting the capabilities of NATO forces operating in the area. Under constant attack from Naga, Gray is given command of U.S. Navy SEALs (or other NATO special forces team members depending on which version of the game is being played). Meanwhile, Eric Schweitzer and Dion Wells are tasked with aiding NATO in seeking out and destroying the insurgent threat by removing their leader.

While patrolling the NATO ops center's perimeter, the command center is attacked and Commander Gorman is presumably killed. Commander Gray leads his men through the city with aid from an off-shore command asset code-named "Oracle", an MI6 liaison, and engages Naga forces before fleeing from the city in an attempt to meet up with other NATO forces operating in the region. Gorman had ordered members of the South Korean 707th Special Mission Battalion to conduct recon on a supply point, but their transport aircraft is shot down en route by anti-air guns. OpsCom rescues two survivors, Park Yoon-Hee and Chung Kwan, before continuing his mission to remove the threat from Naga.

Conducting guerrilla warfare actions and special recon operations against Naga forces, the NATO team destroys Naga assets and hunts down their leader, Sibak Razad. As the team draws closer to locating him, they find Clawhammer secretly moving arms and supplies into the region and establishing command posts - it is also revealed that ten years earlier in the same region, Cullen Gray was assigned to a special forces team tasked with capturing the country's warlord dictator Chen, but executed him instead, causing the destabilization that led to civil war and the eventual formation of the Naga insurgency.

The team locates Razad and attacks his base of operations and secures him, and upon interrogation, he reveals that it's Clawhammer that was supplying his forces with arms and equipment. The team attempts to flee, but Clawhammer forces ambush the team and Razad is killed by sniper fire. The team is forced to fight through them, narrowly escaping. Clawhammer begins engaging the remaining Naga forces in the region, and with Naga crippled, the NATO team now focuses on finding out what Clawhammer is up to the region. Lt. Park carries out reconnaissance operations against Clawhammer to learn their motive for treachery and discovers Commander Gorman not only alive, but leading the Clawhammer forces. Their plan is to sink a ship, the Kurtz, in a strait of the region. As the ship is carrying several tons of explosive materials, a well placed missile strike would equal a nuclear yield blast without the radioactive fallout. The NATO team battles against Clawhammer and secures the missile. Gray sends his team to secure an evacuation while he disarms the missile, but is mortally wounded by Gorman, who reveals that the operation was meant to be a major economy boost for Clawhammer and the region. Gray manages to stab Gorman in the neck with his pen and the later flees. The team checks on Gray but it is too late. Gray passes his command position onto Park and orders her to find and arrest Gorman before dying.

Park leads the remaining members of the NATO forces into the capital, where she hunts Gorman and his remaining body guards down before they can flee the country. "Oracle" tracks him in a convoy of Clawhammer vehicles heading to a train station used as an evacuation zone. After fighting through the remaining Clawhammer forces, and destroying the convoy, Park tracks down Gorman, cornering the commander and holding him at gunpoint - the player is given the choice to either execute or spare his life. In choosing to spare Gorman's life, it's implied that he is brought to justice and spends the rest of his life in prison. If the player kills Gorman, however, Park removes her headset, discards her weapon, and walks away.

== Multiplayer ==
One of the main features of this game is the ability to play the co-op mode, replacing the AI Special Ops team with players via online play. Players can play instant action missions. Players can also unlock "Character Skins" for online play.

SOCOM 4 U.S. Navy SEALs does not have lobbies like previous installments. Instead SOCOM 4 U.S. Navy SEALs has a Quick Match system along with a Party System to meet up with friends before creation of a game. The Party System was implemented in patch 1.03. SOCOM 4 U.S. Navy SEALs's Online Multiplayer comes in three forms: Standard, Classic, and Custom.

Unlike previous SOCOMs, SOCOM 4 U.S. Navy SEALs does not include many classic modes: Breach, Escort, Extraction, Control, and Convoy game modes. Instead, it features mainly all new game modes, with one classic mode, Suppression, available out of the box, and another, Demolition, available as DLC.

- Last Defense: An objective-based game that requires the teams to capture all the neutral sectors placed in the middle of the map to find the opposing team's headquarters. It takes 12 seconds to fully capture a sector, and if a player dies while attempting a capture, the capture bar will remain at the same point; the player will only have to fill the bar from that point. In order to re-capture a captured sector, the team will have to fill the capture bar twice: once to remove the opponent's capture bar, and again to fill their own.
- Uplink: Uplink is similar to a typical capture the flag mode. One team attacks while another defends in this game mode. The attacking team is given the task to steal the defending team's data by downloading it off random data locations set throughout the map. These data locations are shown on both teams' HUD.
- Suppression: A standard team deathmatch game mode.
- Bomb Squad: Similar to search and destroy mode, but with more than one bomb site. One team must protect the bomb sites while the other team must disarm them. The team that disarms the random bomb sites has one player randomly chosen as their Bomb Technician. The technician is heavily protected and armed with two unique weapons.
- Demolition (DLC): An objective-based game in which a Bomb is located in a central area of the map and both teams must fight to acquire the Bomb, bring it into the heart of the opposing team's spawn area, and plant the Bomb at a designated location. Either team can acquire and use the Bomb, and there is no penalty placed on a player in possession of the Bomb. If a player carrying the Bomb is killed, the Bomb is dropped on the ground at the point in which the carrier was killed and will remain for a set amount of time for any other player to acquire. Should a player not pick the Bomb up, it will eventually respawn at its starting location. Once the Bomb has been planted in a team's HQ area, they have 30 seconds to attempt to disarm the Bomb. A team wins the round by either successfully planting and defending the Bomb until detonation, or if they disarm a Bomb that was planted in their HQ by the opposing team.
- SCRUM (Custom): A Suppression mod that offers a "Classic" rules-inspired list of features that includes no respawn, no Sniper Rifles, no Concussion, Poison Gas, or Frag Grenades, higher damage and faster character movement.
- Sniper Alley (Custom): Another 8-vs-8 variation on "Classic" Suppression that has higher damage values and weapon restrictions that allow players access to only Smoke and Poison Gas Grenades, Shotguns, and of course, Sniper Rifles.
- Last Defense Run 'n Gun (Custom): Fast-paced deviation from the Last Defense gametype that includes speedier player movement, reduced weapon damage, and limitations to sub-machine guns and shotguns only.
- Community Day Classic (Custom): Suggested by members of Zipper Community Day 2011, Community Day Classic offers a medley of different maps that support 8-vs-8 "Classic" variations on Suppression, Uplink, Last Defense and Bomb Squad with faster movement and no ranged explosives of any kind.

== Development ==
The pre-order bonus for SOCOM 4 U.S. Navy SEALs includes a shotgun for both the Spec Ops and the Insurgents. Pre-ordering at Gamestop also included the code to download the classic SOCOM map "Abandoned" from the original SOCOM U.S. Navy SEALs game. Zipper stated the SOCOM 4 U.S. Navy SEALs version of Abandoned will be the day-time version like SOCOM 1, unlike SOCOM 2's night-time version of Abandoned.

On April 15, 2011, Zipper announced the "SOCOM Pro DLC", April 19, as any player who purchases a new copy of SOCOM 4 U.S. Navy SEALs receives exclusive access to all "Pro" Custom Game queues. Pro queues will be ranked, and they are also updated regularly. Moreover, the first set of "Pro" Custom Game types will be the same rule sets that the SOCOM fans tested during the SOCOM 4 beta period. Another incentive for SOCOM Pro players is an exclusive pair of weapons. The M16A4 (for Spec-Ops) and the AK-47 (for the Insurgents) assault rifles. Expected to be available within the first 30 days of SOCOM 4 U.S. Navy SEALs''s release. On October 18, the Demolition map pack returned the demolition game mode that was excluded from the main game. The map pack also includes four new maps, including classic maps such as Bitter Jungle and Ruins. Also included were to be two new weapons, the 552 and the HS-C3 as well as six new multiplayer skins. Also on November 1, the Evac Co-op pack was added to the PlayStation Store for $7.99. It offers the Evac mode for Co-op as well as six new skins and two new weapons, the M82A1A and the AM50. Zipper claimed these additions were just the beginning and that they had plenty more planned for SOCOM Pro down the road including access to exclusive multiplayer maps, various co-op additions, dedicated leaderboards, and more. However, the closure of Zipper Interactive on March 30, 2012 means any future support of the game is unlikely.

== Reception ==
Reception

Aggregate score
Aggregator	Score
Metacritic	67/100

SOCOM 4 U.S. Navy SEALs received "mixed or average" reviews, according to review aggregator Metacritic.
