= Unit 13 =

2012 third-person shooter video game

- Developer: Zipper Interactive
- Publisher: Sony Computer Entertainment
- Composer: Justin Burnett
- Platform: PlayStation Vita
- Release: NA: March 6, 2012; EU: March 7, 2012; JP: March 8, 2012
- Genre: Third-person shooter
- Modes: Single-player, multiplayer

Unit 13 is a third-person shooter video game developed by Zipper Interactive and published by Sony Computer Entertainment for the PlayStation Vita. This is the last game to be developed by Zipper Interactive before the studio was rendered defunct. It was released on March 6, 2012, in North America, March 7 in Europe and March 8 in Japan.

== Gameplay ==
Unit 13 plays much like the SOCOM franchise. The camera stays directly behind the player character in third-person, or otherwise shifts to first person aim if the player selects the option to zoom in with guns that have the compatible attachments. Objectives can be completed in any order in each mission, with some missions allowing taking any approach to accomplish a goal (Direct Action) while others have certain conditions, such as requiring stealth.

All missions can be played co-operatively, and each mission features an unlockable "Dynamic" Mode, which changes objectives and objective locations, enemy weapons and locations, to random values and points in the environment.

Missions are generally categorised into numerous categories:

- Direct Action: standard operations that allow firefights or stealth
- Deadline: players are given a set amount of time to complete a certain portion of a mission. The more time remaining when that portion is complete, the higher the score bonus for that portion.
- Elite: players start with a set amount of health that only regenerates at certain checkpoints. The higher one's health at a checkpoint, the higher the score bonus for that section of a mission.
- Covert: heavily encourage stealth, with the player failing the mission if they are seen by an enemy or set off an alarm. Although one can kill enemies, this reduces the score that is earned at the end of the mission.
- High Value Target: similar to Direct Action, but feature a 'boss' character towards the ending protected by significant amount of bodyguards.

The higher one's score at the end of each mission, the more stars they earn. As they achieve a larger quantity of stars, they will be able to unlock HVT missions.

=== Demo version ===
A demo version was released for download of the PlayStation Network. It features the opening tutorial mission where players learn the controls and how to otherwise play the game, as well as the complete first mission, named 'Operation Open Flame'. The demo also provides a leaderboard for this mission, both regional and global, as well as being able to play this mission in "Dynamic" Mode. However, Dynamic mode does not support leaderboard ranking, as the mission has random insertions and objectives. The demo version allows for six playable characters, Commando, Technician, Pointman, Gunner, Infiltrator, and Marksman. All characters may progress up to level 4 by completing the single mission well and gaining experience for performance.

== Characters ==
=== Playable characters ===
- Chuckles: Technician
- Python: Gunner
- Ringo: Infiltrator
- Zeus: Pointman
- Animal: Commando
- Alabama: Sharpshooter

=== Allies ===
- Deborah James: direct contact
- CPT Alan Toby: a captain who has gone missing

=== Enemies ===
- Omar Khalid Gutaale: genocidal poster boy of Awlaad al-Qowah, codename Viper
- Khaldun bin-Mahmmood: propaganda minister of Awlaad al-Qowah, codename Phoenix
- Bassam Murat: arms dealer of Awlaad al-Qowah, codename Hyena
- Waqar Walud-Najib: strongest political ally to Awlaad al-Qowah, codename Grifter
- Kasim Guleed: key African enforcer for Awlaad al-Qowah, codename Vampire
- Sayf al-Sahra'a: terrorist for Awlaad al-Qowah, codename Scimitar
- Faisal Abdul-Rashid: responsible for West Asia's biggest human trafficking ring, codename Slick
- Malik bin-Abbas: founding member and second in command of Awlaad al-Qowah, codename Wizard
- Afzal Aamir: Commander of Awlaad al-Qowah, codename Scorpion

== Reception ==
Reception

Aggregate scores
Aggregator	Score
GameRankings	72%
Metacritic	71/100

Review scores
Publication	Score
Eurogamer	8/10
Game Informer	6.5/10
VideoGamer.com	6/10
Push Square	7/10

Unit 13 has a rating of 71/100 on the review aggregate site Metacritic. Game Informer gave the game a 6.5/10, saying that it "controls admirably", but heavily criticizing the game's lack of innovation, poor enemy A.I., and limited gameplay variety ("The variety of mission types is nice on paper, but [...] most missions boil down to the same 'pop out of cover to shoot bad guys' gameplay"). They found the random enemy A.I. particularly frustrating given that getting spotted results in mission failure in most cases.
