= Justin Burnett =

- Born: Justin Caine Burnett; May 2, 1973 (age 53)
- Origin: United States
- Genres: Film score, video game music
- Occupation: Composer
- Instrument: Keyboards

Justin Caine Burnett (born May 2, 1973) is an American film and video game music composer.

== Career ==
Justin Burnett started his career working for Hans Zimmer from 1995 through 2000. During this tenure he worked on films such as Broken Arrow, As Good as It Gets, The Prince of Egypt, The Road to El Dorado, and Gladiator. Since 2000, Burnett has also been known for his work with film composer Harry Gregson-Williams. With Harry Gregson-Williams, Burnett has worked on films such as Spy Game, Phone Booth, Veronica Guerin, Passionada, Man on Fire, Déjà Vu, The Taking of Pelham 123, Unstoppable, and Cowboys & Aliens. Additionally, Burnett worked with Walter Werzowa at Musikvergnuegen from 2000 to 2005 on numerous commercials, movie trailers and network branding projects.

=== Film scoring ===
Justin Burnett scored his first feature film Possums which was featured in 1998 at the Sundance Film Festival. His second notable film was Dungeons & Dragons which was released in theaters in 2000. Ending his time at Remote Control Productions, it was in 2000 that Burnett began his collaboration with Harry Gregson-Williams. In 2005, Burnett composed the music for the film An American Haunting under the pseudonym Caine Davidson. Since then, Burnett has composed music for numerous films such as I'll Always Know What You Did Last Summer, Iron Cross, Crave, and Java Heat among others.

== Discography ==
=== Film ===
Year	Title	Director	Studio(s)	Notes
1998	Possums	Max Burnett	Monarch Home Video	—N/a
1998	Drive	Charles Sapadin	—N/a	Short film
2000	Dungeons & Dragons	Courtney Solomon	New Line Cinema; Silver Pictures	—N/a
2004	Sunflower	Cathy Ziehl	—N/a	—N/a
2005	Venice Underground	Eric DelaBarre	—N/a	—N/a
2005	Cat Fight	Jerry McNutt	—N/a	Short film
2005	Worms	Jerry McNutt	—N/a	Short film
2005	An American Haunting	Courtney Solomon	After Dark Films; Remstar Productions; MediaPro Studios	Credited as Caine Davidson
2006	I'll Always Know What You Did Last Summer	Sylvain White	Destination Films; Original Film	—N/a
2007	The Gray Man	Scott Flynn	RavenWolf Films	—N/a
2008	The Cyber Man	Brendan Sheppard	—N/a	Documentary
2008	Ring of Death	Bradford May	—N/a	Television film
2009	Slaughter	Stewart Hopewell	After Dark Films	—N/a
2009	The Bleeding	Charlie Picerni	—N/a	—N/a
2010	Iron Cross	Joshua Newton	—N/a	Composed with Roger Bellon and Joshua Field
2012	Crave	Charles de Lauzirika	Phase 4 Films	—N/a
2013	Java Heat	Conor Allyn	IFC Films; IM Global	—N/a
2013	Anniversario	Jeffrey Dechausse	—N/a	Short film
2013	Getaway	Courtney Solomon	Warner Bros. Pictures; Dark Castle Entertainment	—N/a
2013	But with a Whisper	Robert Sexton	—N/a	Short film
2013	Of Gods and Kings: The Skyros Horse	Jen Miller; Sophie Dia Pegrum	—N/a	Documentary; Short film
2014	Roadkill	Samir Arabzadeh	—N/a	Short film
2015	Re-Kill	Valeri Milev	After Dark Films; Midsummer Films	—N/a
2019	After	Jenny Gage	Cal Maple/Aviron Pictures	—N/a
2020	After We Collided	Roger Kumble	Cal Maple/Open Road Films	—N/a
2024	The Strangers: Chapter 1	Renny Harlin	Lionsgate	Composed with Òscar Senén
2025	The Strangers – Chapter 2	Renny Harlin	Lionsgate	Composed with Òscar Senén
2026	The Strangers – Chapter 3	Renny Harlin	Lionsgate	Composed with Òscar Senén

Additional music credits

Year	Title	Main composer	Notes
2002	Passionada	Harry Gregson-Williams	—N/a
2003	Veronica Guerin	Harry Gregson-Williams	—N/a
2004	Man on Fire	Harry Gregson-Williams	—N/a
2010	Twelve	Harry Gregson-Williams	—N/a
2010	Unstoppable	Harry Gregson-Williams	—N/a
2011	Cowboys & Aliens	Harry Gregson-Williams	—N/a
2013	The Call	John Debney	—N/a
2014	The Equalizer	Harry Gregson-Williams	—N/a

=== Television ===
Year	Title	Creator	Studio(s)	Notes
1999	Rescue 77	Gregory Widen	Spelling Television	Episode: "Remember Me: Part 1"; Episode: "Remember Me: Part 2"
2000–01	Die Motorrad-Cops – Hart am Limit	—N/a	—N/a	—N/a
2007	The Kill Point	James DeMonaco	Lions Gate Television; Mandeville Films	—N/a
2016	Alarm für Cobra 11	N/A	Action Concept	Episode: "Liebesgrüße aus Moskau"

=== Video games ===
Year	Title	Developer	Publisher	Notes
2006	SOCOM U.S. Navy SEALs: Fireteam Bravo 2	Zipper Interactive	Sony Computer Entertainment	—N/a
2007	Syphon Filter: Logan's Shadow	Bend Studio	Sony Computer Entertainment	Composed with Azam Ali and Jonathan Mayer
2007	SOCOM U.S. Navy SEALs: Tactical Strike	Slant Six Games	Sony Computer Entertainment	—N/a
2008	SOCOM U.S. Navy SEALs: Confrontation	Slant Six Games	Sony Computer Entertainment	—N/a
2012	Unit 13	Zipper Interactive	Sony Computer Entertainment	—N/a
2015	Metal Gear Solid V: The Phantom Pain	Kojima Productions	Konami	Composed with Ludvig Forssell and Daniel James; Music produced by Harry Gregson-Williams
