= SOCOM U.S. Navy SEALs (video game) =

2002 video game

- Developer: Zipper Interactive
- Publisher: Sony Computer Entertainment
- Director: David Sears
- Designer: Graham Keys
- Programmers: Bob Gutmann; Michael Gutmann
- Artists: Russell Phillips; David Kern
- Composer: Jeremy Soule
- Series: SOCOM U.S. Navy SEALs
- Engine: Kinetica
- Platform: PlayStation 2
- Release: NA: August 27, 2002; EU: June 13, 2003; AU: July 11, 2003
- Genres: Third-person shooter, tactical shooter
- Modes: Single-player, multiplayer

SOCOM U.S. Navy SEALs is a 2002 tactical third-person shooter video game developed by Zipper Interactive and published by Sony Computer Entertainment for the PlayStation 2.

In addition to the 12 offline single player missions, SOCOM also featured online play via the Internet. SOCOM uses a USB headset for its speech recognition commands offline, and allows voice chat with teammates when playing online; this was the first game for the PlayStation 2 to use the headset.

The online servers for this game, along with other PlayStation 2 and PlayStation Portable SOCOM titles, were shut down on August 31, 2012.

== Gameplay ==
The player leads a four-man team (three AI-controlled teammates) of United States Navy SEALs through 12 missions in four regions: Alaska, Thailand, Congo, and Turkmenistan in the then-future of 2006 and 2007. In the single player missions, commands can be spoken using the included USB headset or via an onscreen menu if the optional SOCOM headset was not purchased. Typical missions consist of killing terrorists, rescuing hostages, retrieving intelligence, or destroying terrorist bases.

The player character's codename is Kahuna, while the NPC teammates' codenames are Boomer, Spectre and Jester. The team is divided into two sub-groups, Alpha and Bravo. The Alpha group consists of the player and Boomer (the Able element), while the remaining two make up Bravo. Commands can be issued to both individuals and a whole group, for example it is possible to ask team Bravo to remain stationary while the player is scouting the area with Boomer. However the player can not venture alone through a map, when Kahuna is too far away from Boomer he will automatically resume following the player, regardless of prior orders. Briefings and intel such as maps and photos are given prior to each mission.

Before each mission, the player may choose new equipment for themself and their teammates. Usually this consists of a primary and secondary weapon, along with two pieces of equipment like extra ammunition, explosives and so on. However, on some missions it is required that a team member carries a particular piece of equipment, such as C4 for destroying walls or vehicles. Characters are very vulnerable to enemy fire and may die after just a couple of shots, depending on where one is hit and what weapon is used. It is required that at least one teammate survives along with the player, if not the mission fails.

At the end of each mission, the player is given a rating based on stealth, accuracy and teamwork. These ratings are alphabetical, with "A" being the highest grade. Once the game is completed for the first time, the player unlocks a higher difficulty and can try to complete the game again and again with a progressively higher difficulty.

=== Online gameplay ===
Online players choose one of two sides: SEALs or terrorists. Maps consist of three types: suppression (eliminate all members of the opposite team), extraction (rescue hostages) and demolition (capture a satchel and destroy the opposite team's base). SOCOM, SOCOM U.S. Navy SEALs: Confrontation and SOCOM 4: U.S. Navy SEALs for the PlayStation 3 are the only games in the series that do not support LAN play (local multiplayer). In addition to the specific game type, any of the three game modes may be won by eliminating all members of the opposing team. The online features of the game, however, are no longer accessible.

== Plot ==
On November 27, 2006, a U.S. Navy SEAL fireteam consisting of Kahuna, Boomer, Spectre, and Jester is sent in to neutralize an emerging terrorist threat. A new group calling itself the Iron Brotherhood, made up of former Spetsnaz operatives, is using a barge for buying and transporting weapons. They are making their trades with a known black market organization, the Zemy, and the two are rendezvousing in international waters off the coast of Alaska. The team are to eliminate the terrorists, gather intel, and scuttle the freighter. With the intel that the SEALs gathered, SOCOM is able to locate the Brotherhood's headquarters, a ghost town in Alaska. The team is tasked with securing the compound, destroying any weapon caches that are present, and detaining a terrorist named Kola Petrenko, codename Pincushion. Information from Pincushion reveals that the Brotherhood has taken control of an oil platform in the Beaufort Sea. Most of the oil workers were killed, but some are being held captive. The Brotherhood is also threatening to destroy the platform, which would result in a disastrous oil spill. The SEALs infiltrate the platform and neutralize the terrorists and bombs, including the Brotherhood's leader, Aleksei Borisova, codename Spectrum.

In Thailand, a group calling themselves the Riddah Rouge, led by a man named Sudarak Thongkon, has acquired valuable biological data from a smuggler out of Sri Lanka. The terrorists murder him and his crew, then move the data into the jungles of Thailand. With a potential biological threat on their soil, the Thai government requests for international assistance, and the United States sends in the SEALs. Kahuna's team is inserted into the area and travels upriver to intercept and retrieve the data. After moving from one island to another and neutralizing numerous patrols, the team finds some documents. Unfortunately, only half of the data is among them as the other half was moved elsewhere. With the bio data in its possession, Riddah Rouge holds the U.S. ambassador to Thailand and his wife hostage. The terrorists demand ransom money and threaten to execute the two if their demands are not met. Intelligence tracks their movements and is able to locate the hostages at an abandoned temple in the jungles of Hohn Kaen. The team moves in under cover of night and safely extracts the ambassador and his wife. Riddah Rouge manages to manufacture a small amount of bioagent, hoping to destabilize the Thai government. The SEALs are assigned to assault another abandoned temple. While there, the team either captures or kills Thongkon, codename Bad Dog, and secures the bioagents. With their leader in custody, Riddah Rouge disbands.

In the Congo, a new mercenary organization known as Preemptive Strike has established a base in the jungle. They are recruiting European mercenaries while stockpiling weapons and ammunition. Concerned about this new threat, the Congolese government requests aid from the United States. The SEALs are sent in to recon and collect intel. After disabling communications and destroying the enemy munitions, the team finds out that the remaining mercenaries have ambushed and captured a patrol of U.S. Marines. The Marines are being held at the mercenary base camp and are being tortured for information. The SEALs are able to rescue the POWs and eliminate the mercenary leader Magnus, but not before finding out that one of the captive Marines is missing, having been moved to an abandoned German bunker built during World War I containing a network of tunnels and pillboxes. The SEALs successfully liberate the final Marine with the help of U.S. Navy F/A-18 fighter jets firing missiles at designated pillboxes.

In Turkmenistan, members of a terrorist group, the Allah Sadikahu, have attained several portable nuclear devices from various black-market organizations. An informant named Basim Maccek, codename Mr. Pickle, has knowledge about the nuclear devices, but is captured. He is imprisoned in a Turkmen Detention Center in the mountains and the SEALs are sent in to extract him. Mr. Pickle confirms the presence of two suitcase nukes in Turkmenistan and their location. Sadikahu has concealed the devices in a desert cave network close to the Afghan border. The team travels to the location. After a firefight, the team manages to destroy the nukes and the cave system. The Sadikahu's leader Mullah Bahir Al-Qadi, however, is not present. He and his brother Imad have retreated to a deserted bombed city in central Turkmenistan. Kahuna's team is sent in to find and neutralize the Al-Qadi brothers. The SEALs fight against countless terrorist defenders as Mullah and Imad Al-Qadi, codename Fat Cat and Kitten, call for helicopters to come and extract them.

In the end, both brothers are killed and the mission is completed.

== Development ==
The game was in development for three years.

== Reception ==
Reception

Aggregate score
Aggregator	Score
Metacritic	82/100

SOCOM U.S. Navy SEALs received "generally positive" reviews, according to review aggregator Metacritic. GameSpot named it the best PlayStation 2 game of August 2002. It won GameSpot's annual "Best Online Game on PlayStation 2" award, and a runner-up for "Best Sound on PlayStation 2".

By July 2006, SOCOM U.S. Navy SEALs had sold 1.4 million copies and earned $82 million in the United States. Next Generation ranked it as the 34th highest-selling game launched for the PlayStation 2, Xbox or GameCube between January 2000 and July 2006 in that country. Combined sales of SOCOM releases reached 3.9 million units in the United States by July 2006. The game has sold two million copies by November 2003 and 3.5 million copies by May 2005.
