= DeathDrome =

1996 video game

- Cover art
- Developer: Zipper Interactive
- Publisher: Viacom New Media
- Platform: Windows
- Release: NA: November 8, 1996
- Genre: Third-person shooter
- Modes: Single player, Multiplayer

DeathDrome is a 1996 third-person shooter game developed by Zipper Interactive and published by Viacom New Media. It was the first game to be developed by Zipper Interactive.

== Story ==
The game takes place in 2057, where crime is rampant and jails are overpopulated. The government forms the Committee of Recreational Termination (C.O.R.T.) in order to eliminate the surplus of convicts. In this competition, convicts must take part in deathmatches in which one will survive and be declared winner.

== Reception ==
Reception

Review scores
Publication	Score
GameSpot	7.4/10
Next Generation	3/5
PC Gamer	68%

GameSpot called DeathDrome "one of the best games of its kind to arrive on the scene in quite some time." He particularly praised the creative weapons and the tension created by having the "scrub" mechanic instead of the game immediately ending when time runs out. He remarked that the fact that enemies always spawn at the center podium is too easily exploited in single-player mode, but felt the main draw is the multiplayer mode in any case. Next Generation also noted the creative weapons and "truly hairbreadth escapes" as time runs out as the highlights. He also complimented how the developers maintained a decent frame rate by dividing the arenas into four sections. However, he concluded that "While DeathDrome has some interesting elements, it's hardly groundbreaking enough to be remembered a year from now."
