= To Sleep in a Sea of Stars =

2020 novel by Christopher Paolini

- Author: Christopher Paolini
- Language: English
- Genre: Science fiction
- Publisher: Macmillan Publishers
- Publication date: 15 September 2020
- Publication place: United States
- Media type: Hardcover, softback, Ebook
- Pages: 880
- ISBN: 978-1-5290-4652-6
- Followed by: Fractal Noise
- Website: Official website

To Sleep in a Sea of Stars is a 2020 science fiction novel written by American author Christopher Paolini and published under the Tor imprint of Macmillan Publishers. The book is unrelated to his Inheritance Cycle series. In an interview, Paolini described the book as adult-oriented as opposed to the young adult genre of his previous books.

The audiobook is read by Canadian American voice actress Jennifer Hale.

== Plot ==
Kira Navárez is a xenobiologist in the year 2257 who plans to settle down with her fiance on a new colony in the Sigma Draconis system. Her last assignment is to investigate a crashed drone, which leads her to discover an alien reliquary. Inside, she awakens the Soft Blade, an ancient nanotechnology created by advanced, extinct beings known as the Vanished. The Soft Blade covers her body and binds itself to her will, but it is unaccustomed to serving humans.

At her research base, the Soft Blade believes she is in danger and launches tendrils that impale everyone around her, including her fiance. She is taken into military quarantine, where a doctor, Carr, experiments on the Soft Blade, burning it and Kira with laser blasts despite her pleas for him to stop. Carr is interrupted by an attack from the Wranaui, aliens who worship the Vanished and had hidden the Soft Blade in the reliquary. Kira escapes and inadvertently causes an explosion that joins a damaged piece of the Soft Blade to both Carr and one of the Wranaui, creating a malevolent, corrupted being calling itself the Maw, which floats through space seeking to grow and spread despite its madness and pain. It eventually finds a planet and begins converting the planet's mass into interstellar ships containing Corrupted warriors.

Kira flees to 61 Cygni on a shuttle and discovers that the Wranaui have started a war with humanity, as they believe that humanity intentionally activated the Soft Blade and created the Maw. She is rescued by the Wallfish, a smuggler ship, and convinces its crew to help her access a Wranaui ship, as she intends to use the Soft Blade to broadcast a diplomatic message from the ship’s transmitters. They succeed in boarding a disabled attacking ship, but she is only able to broadcast the location of the Soft Blade, drawing large numbers of both Wranaui and Corrupted to the system. The Soft Blade shows her memories of a Vanished relic, the Staff of Blue, which would allow her to eradicate the Corrupted and protect humanity from the Wranaui.

The Wallfish and a military cruiser journey to the Vanished planet containing the Staff of Blue, but they find it irreparably broken. They are attacked by Wranaui and Corrupted who had tracked them there, but they are saved by the Knot of Minds, a rebellious faction within the Wranaui. It has learned the truth of the Soft Blade’s awakening and seeks to form an alliance with humanity against the Corrupted. The Knot has a plan to use a human warship to kill the current Wranaui leader, Ctein, a tyrant who has genetically modified the Wranaui to be unable to directly kill it.

The Wallfish travels to Sol to inform Earth of the Knot’s offer, but the military detains Kira and the Wallfish crew and sends a fleet to ambush the Knot at their rendezvous point under orders from Earth's leader. Kira and the Wallfish crew escape during a Corrupted attack and leave to warn the Knot and preserve the chance of an alliance. They succeed and travel with the Knot to Ctein’s fleet, which is preparing for a final push against humanity.

As a human attack distracts Ctein, the Knot escorts the Wallfish within firing range, telling Ctein's fleet that its computers contain vital intelligence. The Wallfish hits Ctein’s ship with a nuclear shaped charge, but it does not succeed in killing Ctein, and Wranaui laser defenses preclude further hits. The Wallfish crew boards Ctein’s ship, and Kira advances through the ship with the Soft Blade, which she has now mastered. She kills the numerous Wranaui defenders but finds that Ctein is clad in Vanished armor that resists the Soft Blade. Ctein slowly wears her down, but a surprise attack from the Wallfish's captain opens a hole in the armor large enough for the Soft Blade to breach it and kill Ctein.

The Knot takes control of the Wranaui and unites with the human fleet against the Maw, which has arrived at the system. Kira desperately tries to disable the Maw by killing Carr and the Wranaui controlling it with a nuclear explosion, but instead the Maw’s portion of the Soft Blade merges with her own, joining their minds. She uses her presence to soothe and subdue the Maw's controllers and unmake the Corrupted. She then converts the Maw’s mass into a space station, Unity, intended to serve as an embassy between humanity and the Wranaui. Finally, Kira reveals that the Maw had previously released seven parts of itself in different directions, and she departs alone to track them down.

== Fictional physics ==
The setting of To Sleep in a Sea of Stars contains superluminal travel. Paolini based superluminal travel on Gregory Meholic's Tri-Space theory, which in turn is inspired by Edward A. Puscher's 1980 report on possible characteristics of tachyons.

In the novel's setting, a boundary exists between subluminal (slower than light) and superluminal (faster than light) regions of space. When traveling faster than light, an object's energy decreases as its velocity increases, mirroring the effects described by real-world equations for mass-energy equivalence. Usually, only particles of negative mass (such as tachyons) are able to inhabit this superluminal space, but in the setting, characters can use a machine called a Markov Drive to create a subluminal bubble within superluminal space, and thus can travel multiple times the speed of light.

== Reception ==
The novel received positive reviews from critics, with praise directed towards Paolini's worldbuilding, plot, and pace. Kirkus Reviews called it "A fun, fast-paced epic that science fiction fans will gobble up." The Nerd Daily awarded the novel an eight out of ten, stating it was "...a wild ride from the start to the end".

The novel won the 2020 Goodreads Choice Awards for Best Science Fiction Novel.

== Television adaptation ==
On October 8, 2020, Paolini announced on Twitter that To Sleep in a Sea of Stars would be adapted for film by him and his sister, Angela Paolini, in collaboration with Made Up Stories and Snoot Entertainment. Paolini and his sister will also serve as executive producers on the project. The news was also covered in entertainment trade press.

In August 2022, Paolini announced that the book would no longer be adapted as a feature film, but instead was being adapted as a television show and that writing had already begun on episodic scripts.

== Prequel ==
A prequel titled Fractal Noise was released on May 16, 2023.
