= Fractal Noise =

2023 novel by Christopher Paolini

- Author: Christopher Paolini
- Language: English
- Series: Fractalverse
- Subject: Science fiction
- Publisher: Macmillan Publishers
- Publication date: May 16, 2023
- Publication place: United States
- ISBN: 978-1250862488
- Preceded by: To Sleep in a Sea of Stars

Fractal Noise is a 2023 science fiction novel written by American author Christopher Paolini and published under the Tor imprint of Macmillan Publishers. It is a prequel to the 2020 book To Sleep in a Sea of Stars and was released on May 16, 2023. Jennifer Hale returns to narrate the audiobook.

== History ==
Paolini had worked on the book since 2013. The book was teased by Paolini on social media before he announced on October 3, 2022. The book's cover artwork drew criticism for using AI-generated imagery.

== Reception ==
Publishers Weekly, in a starred review, wrote, "Paolini makes the experiences of his well-shaded explorers vivid and gripping through smart worldbuilding and believable stakes."

Jeremiah Rood, writing in Library Journal, concluded, "Those daunted by the 800+ pages of the first in this series, To Sleep in a Sea of Stars, will find this a comparably brief read, and it works well as an excellent starting point for the series as a whole."
