= SOCOM U.S. Navy SEALs: Fireteam Bravo 2 =

2006 video game

- Developer: Zipper Interactive
- Publisher: Sony Computer Entertainment
- Producer: Tony Iuppa
- Designer: Ed Byrne
- Artist: Derek Bowman
- Writers: Ed Byrne; Paul Levy
- Composer: Justin Burnett
- Series: SOCOM U.S. Navy SEALs
- Platform: PlayStation Portable
- Release: NA: November 21, 2006; EU: June 15, 2007; AU: June 21, 2007
- Genre: Tactical shooter
- Modes: Single-player, multiplayer

SOCOM U.S. Navy SEALs: Fireteam Bravo 2 is a 2006 tactical third-person shooter video game developed by Zipper Interactive and published by Sony Computer Entertainment for the PlayStation Portable. It is the sequel to SOCOM U.S. Navy SEALs: Fireteam Bravo. This game is able to sync with the PlayStation 2 game SOCOM U.S. Navy SEALs: Combined Assault in order to unlock bonus features.

Fireteam Bravo 2 features a new campaign, multiplayer maps, and new features such as Command Equity (CE) and Local Influence (LI). Fireteam Bravo 2's campaign mode offers 14 story missions, a variety of partners including the sniper LONESTAR, and two partners codenamed BRONCO and WRAITH, a support gunner and stealth/CQC specialist, from SOCOM: U.S. Navy SEALs: Mobile Reco which was available for cell phones, and dynamically generated instant action missions.

The game takes place solely in the fictional country of Adjikistan. The country is supposedly situated somewhere in Central Asia near Afghanistan/Pakistan and features a number of environment and climate zones, allowing for the game to feature a wide variety of landscapes and settings while working within one large, connected story. The main adversaries throughout the game are mercenaries, often abbreviated as "mercs."

The online servers for this game, along with other PlayStation 2 and PlayStation Portable SOCOM titles, were shut down on August 31, 2012.

== Features ==
- Command Equity system (often referenced to as "CE") provides rewards for how well core aspects of a mission are completed, while Local Influence (LI) rewards those who help local causes and limit civilian casualties. Use them to gain access to new weapons, equipment, intel, air-strikes and local support. It is also earned in online games, and as well used for items that one could use in online mode, especially clothing for either character on the SEALs or Mercenaries' side.
- Battle through eight new multiplayer maps, as well as four of the original Fireteam Bravo maps, and three new game types (Tug of War, Capture the Flag, Target) playable in Infrastructure Mode and Ad Hoc modes.
- Enhanced Crosstalk with SOCOM: U.S. Navy SEALs Combined Assault for the PS2, including a single story arc, and all new action events and unlockables.
- Association with Naval Special Forces ensures realistic SEAL team tactics, missions, and character movements.
- Asymmetrical mission structure allows players to play missions in any order they want. Completed mission areas can open new missions and objectives for the player to complete.

== Plot ==
The story is set in Adjikistan, a fictional country that is experiencing civil unrest. At first, it appears that the Adjikistani rebel factions are simply terrorists, but as the story progresses it is revealed that the president of Adjikistan, Ismail Karim, is in fact corrupt and using his influence and hired European mercenaries to crush all who oppose him.

== Reception ==
Reception

Aggregate score
Aggregator	Score
Metacritic	81/100

SOCOM U.S. Navy SEALs: Fireteam Bravo 2 received "generally positive" reviews, according to review aggregator Metacritic.

As of June 2009, the game has sold over 800,000 units in the United States.
