= SOCOM II U.S. Navy SEALs =

2003 video game

- Developer: Zipper Interactive
- Publisher: Sony Computer Entertainment
- Director: David Sears
- Designer: Graham Keys
- Programmers: Bob Gutmann; Michael Gutmann
- Artists: Russell Phillips; David Kern
- Composer: Inon Zur
- Series: SOCOM U.S. Navy SEALs
- Engine: Kinetica
- Platform: PlayStation 2
- Release: NA: November 4, 2003; EU: March 5, 2004
- Genres: Third-person shooter, tactical shooter
- Modes: Single-player, multiplayer

SOCOM II U.S. Navy SEALs is a 2003 tactical third-person shooter video game developed by Zipper Interactive and published by Sony Computer Entertainment for the PlayStation 2. It is the sequel to SOCOM U.S. Navy SEALs.

The online servers for this game, along with other PlayStation 2 and PlayStation Portable SOCOM titles, were shut down on August 31, 2012.

== Gameplay ==
SOCOM II U.S. Navy SEALs is a third-person tactical shooter. There are 12 different single-player missions: split equally between Albania, Algeria, Brazil and Russia. There are five different ranks that can be played in the game: Ensign, Lieutenant, Commander, Captain and Admiral. The player starts with the first three ranks unlocked, but must finish the single player game on Commander to unlock Captain, and on Captain to unlock Admiral. Players can unlock new models for multiplayer, as well as movies, music, concept art, and credits by completing certain objectives.

Each mission has primary, secondary, and hidden bonus objectives. Players have to complete all the primary objectives to win the mission, and secondary objectives are optional, but add to the overall score for the mission. The hidden bonus objectives usually help make other missions easier. For example, finding a map in one mission means the player will not have to work to find that place in the next mission. A letter grade is received at the end of each mission based on 4 categories of score: Stealth, Accuracy, Teamwork, and Objective Completion. In single player, orders can be given to the rest of the team. This can be done using either the command menu or a USB headset. The menu features new command options, enabling the player to order their teammates to drop to the ground and hold position when outdoors.

The online and LAN multiplayer portion of SOCOM II U.S. Navy SEALs requires a broadband connection for play. This mode sets two teams of up to eight, SEALs and Terrorists, against each other. The default round time is six minutes, and each game is decided based on the first team to win 6 of 11 possible rounds. Each team spawns at opposite sides of the map, and proceeds to pursue its objective. When a character dies, the player must wait for the next round to resume play. While dead, the player may monitor the status of his teammates, and may change his weapon load. In a room created by a given SOCOM II U.S. Navy SEALs user, factors such as the number of rounds, round type, round time, weapon restrictions, and friendly fire can all be adjusted to the creator's liking.

SOCOM II U.S. Navy SEALs supports chat and prohibits in-game loitering. Voice chat is permitted in server lobbies, but not while in the armory of game lobbies. There are in-game options to mute certain players and to switch to different channels of communication (offense, defense, etc.). Problems with locating acquaintances in the original SOCOM online lead to the development of both a Friend List and a Clan Roster. The game features twelve new online maps, along with ten maps from the original SOCOM. The maps carried over from SOCOM have undergone minor changes such as turrets and breaches being added, daytime maps being switched to night and some paths being blocked, while others have been opened. Three additional maps could be played by purchasing an issue of the Official PlayStation Magazine which came with a CD. Players would then install the contents of the CD onto their PS2 hard drive. Online capabilities were terminated on August 31, 2012.

== Plot ==
SEAL team operatives Specter (Paul Mercier), Jester (Jason Spisak), Wardog (Michael Clarke Duncan), and Vandal (Larry Cedar) are alerted by an informant codenamed MALLARD of a black market group called the Sesseri Syndicate, led by Cassrioti Sesseri (Kast Hasa), who are trafficking and selling weapons and plutonium from their bases in Albania and sending them to cities from London to Cairo. The SEALs are sent in to investigate, locate and destroy the Syndicate's weapon caches and if possible, and capture a mid-level member named Besnik for interrogation. The Bravo element in the team is later replaced by two highly trained Special Air Service (SAS) operatives, callsigns Sabre and Reaver. The SEALs and their SAS counterparts are charged with bringing down the Syndicate, first by shutting down an abandoned factory in Shkodër as well as capturing or killing the man over the factory, General Mizlech Rugova, then capturing or killing the remaining leaders at their stronghold, the Sesseri family castle in the Albanian mountains. The team neutralizes the Syndicate's leadership and the organization falls apart.

In Brazil, a group calling themselves the Revolutionary Armed Forces of Brazil (RAFB) have threatened to seize control of the Brazilian government. A rebel deserter who had stolen cocaine escapes through the Amazon jungle until Quixada Christo (Fátima Marques), the leader of the RAFB, apprehends and murders him. Christo, the daughter of a prostitute and a wealthy industrialist, harbors a strong resentment of men, explaining the RAFB's majority demographic of females. Within the slums of Rio de Janeiro, the four-man SEAL team is sent to recover information from an informant. When the SEALs arrive at the target building, the informant is not there but is being tortured by RAFB members in the opposite building. The team recovers him and later follows him to a discreet location, where he discloses information about a meeting between Christo and Lucimar, the leader of the local RAFB cell. They eventually capture the cell leader who reveals the whereabouts of an RAFB training camp. The SEALs traveled deep into the Amazonian rain forest and destroyed an underground cocaine factory, which was being used by the RAFB to fund their operations. With their funds cut, Christo and the RAFB made a last desperate attempt to destabilize the government by seizing the "Grand Parana Dam." The RAFB threatened that if their demands are not met, they will blow up the dam, crippling the Brazilian economy. The SEAL team is sent in to retake the dam, defuse any explosive devices on site and kill Christo. The SEALs are successful and the RAFB is no longer a threat.

In Algeria, a separatist faction called the Algerian Patriotic Front (APF), under General Heydar Mahmood, are instigating a coup to take control of the Algerian government. APF soldiers are overrunning the city of Bejaia, where CHA (Coalition for Humanitarian Aid) workers and peacekeepers were staying on a humanitarian mission. The SEAL team is sent to recover the CHA personnel and protect them from APF troops that are in control of the city. They later secure an area around the U.S. Embassy, where two State Department workers were left behind in the confusion of the evacuation. They recover and defend them from continuous attacks from the APF. After the firefight, an HH-60 Pave Hawk arrives and evacuates the group.

In Russia, a group calling itself Force Majeure, also known as the Global Liberation Front, is planning on making and using nuclear weapons to attack the U.S. Intel from operatives in Eastern Europe suggests that Force Majeure's movements in the abandoned Kellski naval shipyard in Kamchatka is a potential terrorist threat. The SEALs are sent in to investigate, supported by two Spetsnaz operatives, callsigns Polaris (Jim Ward) and Bludshot (Quinton Flynn). The team discovers evidence that Force Majeure is creating a nuclear bomb. With their findings, the team gets extracted by the USS Michigan. The Russian Federal Security Service detects the presence of Force Majeure group after investigating a supposed nuclear fuel spill. Disguised as members of the decontamination crew, Force Majeure operatives infiltrated the plant with additional terrorists arriving later. Their plan was to steal enriched uranium to be used in their "dirty bomb". The SEALs and their comrades are sent into the plant to escort a radioactive specialist, codenamed Flatfoot, and discover all of the uranium storages had been emptied.

The SEALs infiltrate a ship, the Bitter Moon, with a large payload of radioactive material, bound for Seattle. The terrorists are planning to detonate the ship near the city. Aboard the ship, the SEALs discovered that MALLARD, the informant from the first mission, is actually an operative for Force Majeure. He had used SOCOM to eliminate the Sesseri Syndicate, thus tying up a loose end, as Force Majeure had bought plutonium from the Syndicate before. The SEALs moves in and defuse all bombs placed on the ship. The female leader of Force Majeure, Valeska Lukanov, is either killed or captured. Mallard, whose real name is Arjan Manjani, is killed. The team signals the USS Michigan to stand down, completing the mission.

== Development ==
The game had a marketing budget of $7.8 million. (Note: Other sources say close to $9 million)

== Reception ==
Reception

Aggregate score
| Aggregator | Score |
|---|---|
| Metacritic | 87/100 |

SOCOM II U.S. Navy SEALs received "generally positive" reviews, according to review aggregator Metacritic.

The game sold more than one million copies by March 2004 and 2.5 million copies by May 2005.
