= SOCOM U.S. Navy SEALs =

- The logo of SOCOM U.S. Navy SEALs, the first game in the series. Subsequent titles use a similar logo.
- Genre(s): third-person Tactical shooter
- Developer(s): Zipper Interactive (2002–2012); Slant Six Games (2007–2010)
- Publisher(s): Sony Computer Entertainment
- Platform(s): PlayStation 2, PlayStation 3, PlayStation Portable
- First release: SOCOM U.S. Navy SEALs; August 27, 2002
- Latest release: SOCOM 4 U.S. Navy SEALs; April 19, 2011

SOCOM U.S. Navy SEALs is a series of third-person tactical shooter video games for the PlayStation 2, PlayStation 3 and PlayStation Portable created by Zipper Interactive and released between 2002 and 2011. The title for the series comes from the United States Special Operations Command (SOCOM) which is a Unified Combatant Command. The games focus on various teams of United States Navy SEALs (an operating component under SOCOM) completing missions with occasional help from other special operations forces from around the world such as the SAS, SBS and GROM.

== Games ==
Aggregate review scores
Game	Metacritic
SOCOM U.S. Navy SEALs	(PS2) 82
SOCOM II U.S. Navy SEALs	(PS2) 87
SOCOM 3 U.S. Navy SEALs	(PS2) 82
SOCOM U.S. Navy SEALs: Fireteam Bravo	(PSP) 82
SOCOM U.S. Navy SEALs: Combined Assault	(PS2) 72
SOCOM U.S. Navy SEALs: Fireteam Bravo 2	(PSP) 81
SOCOM U.S. Navy SEALs: Tactical Strike	(PSP) 72
SOCOM U.S. Navy SEALs: Confrontation	(PS3) 63
SOCOM U.S. Navy SEALs: Fireteam Bravo 3	(PSP) 74
SOCOM 4 U.S. Navy SEALs	(PS3) 67

=== SOCOM U.S. Navy SEALs (2002) ===
SOCOM was one of the earliest titles to use the PS2's online service in North America.

=== SOCOM II U.S. Navy SEALs (2003) ===
A direct sequel for the PlayStation 2 with online play

=== SOCOM 3 U.S. Navy SEALs (2005) ===
Updated version of the franchise for the PlayStation 2

=== SOCOM U.S. Navy SEALs: Fireteam Bravo (2005) ===
The first game in the series released exclusively for the PlayStation Portable

=== SOCOM U.S. Navy SEALs: Combined Assault (2006) ===
For the PlayStation 2, this game allowed players to play the story mode online.

=== SOCOM U.S. Navy SEALs: Fireteam Bravo 2 (2006) ===
An exclusive to the PlayStation Portable

=== SOCOM U.S. Navy SEALs: Tactical Strike (2007) ===
Exclusively for the PlayStation Portable, the gameplay became less run-and-gun and more command and strategic.

=== SOCOM U.S. Navy SEALs: Confrontation (2008) ===
Confrontation is an online-focused game and the first title for the PlayStation 3.

=== SOCOM U.S. Navy SEALs: Fireteam Bravo 3 (2010) ===
The final entry in the PlayStation Portable line Fireteam Bravo

=== SOCOM 4 U.S. Navy SEALs (2011) ===
The second title for the PlayStation 3 and the last title in the franchise, SOCOM 4 is set in Malaysia and serves as the sequel to SOCOM 3.
