= MechWarrior 3 =

1999 video game

- Developer: Zipper Interactive
- Publisher: Hasbro Interactive
- Producer: Michael Mancuso
- Designer: George Sinfield
- Artist: Daniel Dociu
- Series: MechWarrior
- Platform: Microsoft Windows
- Release: NA: June 1, 1999; JP: December 17, 1999; Pirate's Moon: NA: December 3, 1999
- Genre: Vehicle simulation
- Modes: Single-player, multiplayer

MechWarrior 3 is a vehicle simulation game, part of the MechWarrior series. It featured a new 3D accelerated graphics engine at the time of its release. The game contains over 20 missions, with access to 18 different mechs. A novelization called Trial Under Fire was written by Loren L. Coleman.

== Gameplay ==
Mechwarrior 3 is a first-person mecha simulation game, where the player pilots a Mech in each mission. Mechs are giant armored robots and fitted with various projectile and energy weapons. Mechs engage in combat with other mechs as well as traditional military vehicles such as tanks, helicopters, and occasional weapon emplacements. During combat a Mech's weapons and critical components can be damaged, and it is even possible for entire limbs to be blown off of a Mech.

Mech customization is a major aspect of gameplay. The player has near total control over the configuration of each of his or her Mechs. From the type and amount of armor used to various internal components, and all of the Mech's weaponry and ammunition. In the campaign additional parts, weapons, and ammunition are acquired through the missions, captured supplies, and salvaged enemy Mechs.

Also in the campaign, the player controls up to three squadmates, with the ability to issue basic orders such as attack, move, and return to the Mobile Field Bases (MFBs) for repairs.

The Mobile Field Bases are a unique feature not seen in any other Mechwarrior game. The player starts the game with three MFBs, although these can be destroyed. The MFBs travel with the player throughout the missions advancing when ordered to by the player. They carry all the player's supplies, which means there is a weight limit to the amount of supplies the player can keep. The MFBs can provide field repair and resupply provided they are carrying sufficient armor and ammunition. As Mechs do not have shields, and are only protected by armor which is damaged in combat, the MFBs can become crucial in enabling the player to complete a mission.

== Plot ==
The story opens with a short briefing of the Inner Sphere's Operation: Bulldog, a daring plan to eliminate the most hostile and vicious clan in the Inner Sphere, Clan Smoke Jaguar, led by Anastasius Focht and Victor Steiner-Davion. Operation Bulldog and Task Force Serpent have already completed their objectives, but there is one last operation left—the one with which the player is tasked—disrupting Smoke Jaguar regrouping efforts led by Galaxy Commander Brendon Corbett on the planet Tranquil. This mission (codename: Damocles) is to destroy key Smoke Jaguar installations on the planet, including a mech factory, a starport, a geothermal power plant, and the Smoke Jaguar HQ structure. The mission is a commando raid operation with limited forces, and not intended to capture the planet or eliminate all Smoke Jaguar forces on it.

Two dropships are deployed to release the BattleMech force to destroy these installations. However, while in orbit above Tranquil, a dropship is attacked by naval laser fire. The Blackhammer is shot down and the remaining dropship, the Eclipse, retreats to safety. The player was already deployed from the dropship, which had been slightly off target before it was destroyed. The Mobile Field Bases (MFB), which were deployed at the same time as the player, land on target. The player's first mission is to rendezvous with the MFBs and secure the area from hostile forces.

At least seven Mechs are deployed. Two are destroyed by the enemy near the beginning of the game and one toward the end. The novelization mentions one more casualty lost due to a parachute malfunction. The remaining four survivors gradually link up over the course of the game, and learn of the overwhelming success of other Inner Sphere forces across Smoke Jaguar territory from intercepted Clan communications. Although the news of Smoke Jaguar Khan Lincoln Osis’s elimination is welcomed, it becomes clear that Brendon Corbett is his likely successor and that insurmountable Smoke Jaguar reinforcements will arrive on Tranquil within days.

The twelve Mechs remaining from the Eclipse accomplish many of their objectives, but heavy Smoke Jaguar forces prevent them from assisting the player’s force, and eventually force their retreat off planet, leaving the player stranded. Despite this setback, the player must continue with his remaining objectives, hoping that a Clan shuttle can be obtained from the spaceport in order to escape. After completing all objectives and reaching the spaceport’s landing fields, the player is finally confronted by and kills Brendon Corbett in an honour duel for the remaining shuttle. Having ended any hope of a Smoke Jaguar rally on Tranquil, the player’s mechs depart and rendezvous with the Eclipse in orbit.

== Pirate's Moon (expansion pack) ==
In-game screenshot of Mechwarrior 3 with a 'Puma' Light Mech and a 'Thor' Heavy Mech

MechWarrior 3: Pirate's Moon is the only expansion pack for MechWarrior 3, with an all new storyline and 20 new missions, plus six new mechs, brand new terrains, and a number of weapons. The player can select either Campaign Missions or Pirate Missions which contain respective stories.

=== Campaign ===
The Lance Leader from MechWarrior 3 is now given an official name known as 'Lieutenant Connor Sinclair' and returns as main protagonist of the campaign missions. Sinclair is assigned to protect the Federated Suns' control over the planet Vale and its resources against New Belt Pirates led by Susie Ryan. During the confrontation, Sinclair and his lancemates encounter overwhelming pirate forces unexpectedly and explore for the further plot to be unveiled.

=== Pirate Missions ===
The player controls 'Scourge', the New Belt Pirate working for Susie Ryan as the forces attempt to attack the Federated Suns' defense and claim control over the resources on Vale.

== Reception ==
=== Reviews ===
MechWarrior 3

Aggregate score
Aggregator	Score
GameRankings	82%

Review scores
Publication	Score
AllGame	4.5/5
CNET Gamecenter	8/10
Computer Games Strategy Plus	4.5/5
Computer Gaming World	3/5
Edge	7/10
Game Informer	8.75/10
GamePro	3.5/5
GameRevolution	B+
GameSpot	8.3/10
GameZone	9.9/10
IGN	9.1/10
Next Generation	4/5
PC Accelerator	9/10
PC Gamer (US)	86%

MechWarrior 3 received favorable reviews according to the review aggregation website GameRankings. John Lee of NextGen called it "a worthy successor to the two earlier versions that should keep Mech pilots eagerly engaged until the mission packs start rolling out." Although there was only one called Pirate's Moon.

=== Sales ===
The game was heavily promoted in the lead-up to its release. It debuted at #2 on PC Data's computer game sales rankings for May 30–June 5, 1999. The title rose to first place the following week, then remained in the top 10 from June 13–July 10. It took positions 1 and 9, respectively, for June and July overall. The game's sales had risen to 99,000 units in the U.S. by the end of July, according to PC Data. Mark Asher of CNET Gamecenter reported that these figures were "good but certainly not what Hasbro Interactive hoped for". Alongside the underperformance of Starsiege and Heavy Gear II, the sales of the game led Asher to speculate that "the mecha market just isn't as big as we thought". The game was absent from PC Data's weekly top 10 by the week ending July 17, and charted 16th for August before exiting the monthly top 20.

In September 2000, Asher wrote that "the evidence seems to be piling up that games that require anything more than a keyboard and mouse for a control setup suffer at the cash register, [but] the FASA license is as strong as ever. Hasbro Interactive expects to sell about 200,000 copies of MechWarrior 3 this year alone."

=== Awards ===
The game was a runner-up for Computer Gaming World's 1999 "Science Fiction Simulation of the Year", GameSpot's "Science-Fiction Simulation of the Year" and Computer Games Strategy Plus' "Sci-Fi Simulation of the Year" awards, all of which ultimately went to FreeSpace 2. The staff of CGSP wrote: "While it [MechWarrior 3] was light on quantity of missions, Zipper finally got the scale right in a Mech sim." The magazine later named the game as a runner-up for its 2000 "10 Best Sci-Fi Simulations" list. The game won the award for "Best Sci-Fi Simulation" at the CNET Gamecenter Awards for 1999. It also won the Origins Awards for Best Action Computer Game of 1999, and for "Best Fantasy Sim" in PC PowerPlay's Game of the Year 1999 Awards, whereas it was a runner-up for the "Best Intro" award, which went to Half-Life.

=== Pirate's Moon ===
MechWarrior 3: Pirate's Moon

Aggregate score
Aggregator	Score
GameRankings	76%

Review scores
Publication	Score
AllGame	3/5
Computer Games Strategy Plus	4/5
Computer Gaming World	3/5
GamePro	4/5
GameRevolution	B−
GameSpot	7.2/10
GameZone	8.5/10
IGN	7.2/10
PC Accelerator	7/10

Pirate's Moon received favorable reviews, albeit slightly less than the original MechWarrior 3, according to GameRankings.
