= SOCOM U.S. Navy SEALs: Fireteam Bravo =

2005 video game

- Developer: Zipper Interactive
- Publisher: Sony Computer Entertainment
- Director: Hardy F. LeBel Sr.
- Producer: Tony Iuppa
- Designer: Ed Byrne
- Artists: Russell Phillips; Scott Luse
- Writer: Coby Jackson
- Series: SOCOM U.S. Navy SEALs
- Platform: PlayStation Portable
- Release: NA: November 8, 2005; EU: April 21, 2006; AU: April 26, 2006
- Genres: Third-person shooter, tactical shooter
- Modes: Single-player, multiplayer

SOCOM U.S. Navy SEALs: Fireteam Bravo is a 2005 tactical third-person shooter video game developed by Zipper Interactive and published by Sony Computer Entertainment for the PlayStation Portable. It is the first SOCOM U.S. Navy SEALs game in the Fireteam Bravo series. It has both online play (infrastructure mode) and PSP to PSP play (ad hoc). It is similar to the main series games.

The online servers for this game, along with other PlayStation 2 and PlayStation Portable SOCOM titles, were shut down on August 31, 2012.

== Gameplay ==
The most notable difference between Fireteam Bravo and its main series counterparts is the aiming system. The main series' controllers have two analog sticks, while the Fireteam Bravo series has only one. To aim, the player must "lock on" with the R button onto a target and then fire. Within the game there are sniper rifles, assault rifles, machine guns, explosive attachments, ballistic weaponry, and grenades.

=== Multiplayer ===
The game supports up to 16 players at a time, voice chat, and a variety of modes. Fireteam Bravo lacks a ladder system of its own. It includes number of variety of gameplay modes such as Free For All and Captive.

== Reception ==
Reception

Aggregate score
Aggregator	Score
Metacritic	82/100

SOCOM U.S. Navy SEALs: Fireteam Bravo received "generally positive" reviews, according to review aggregator Metacritic.

As of December 27, 2007, the game has sold 910,000 copies in the United States.

Former Manchester United footballer Wayne Rooney claimed the game helped with team-building at the club.
