= SOCOM 3 U.S. Navy SEALs =

2005 video game

- Developer: Zipper Interactive
- Publisher: Sony Computer Entertainment
- Director: Hardy F. LeBel Sr.
- Designer: Travis Steiner
- Artists: Russell Phillips; Dan Henley
- Composer: James Dooley
- Series: SOCOM U.S. Navy SEALs
- Platform: PlayStation 2
- Release: NA: October 11, 2005; EU: April 21, 2006; AU: April 26, 2006
- Genres: Third-person shooter, tactical shooter
- Modes: Single-player, multiplayer

SOCOM 3 U.S. Navy SEALs is a 2005 tactical third-person shooter video game developed by Zipper Interactive and published by Sony Computer Entertainment for the PlayStation 2. It is the sequel to SOCOM II U.S. Navy SEALs.

The online servers for this game, along with other PlayStation 2 and PlayStation Portable SOCOM titles, were shut down on August 31, 2012.

== Gameplay ==
SOCOM 3 U.S. Navy SEALs is a third-person tactical shooter. There are 14 different single-player missions. SOCOM 3 U.S. Navy SEALs is playable on five difficulty levels. At the start, the player can only choose from three of these. If the player completes the game on Commander, they can unlock the Captain difficulty level (which unlocks the Admiral difficulty level upon successful completion).

Every mission has primary, secondary, bonus, and crosstalk objectives - which are compatible with the Sony PSP game SOCOM U.S. Navy SEALs: Fireteam Bravo.

== Plot ==
In the North African campaign, the player's (Specter) fireteam consists "Jester" as well as SEALs "Killjoy" and "Simple". Specter's SEAL team battles the North African Patriotic Front (NAPF), the renamed Algerian Patriotic Front from SOCOM II U.S. Navy SEALs, led by the megalomaniac General Heydar Mahmood and Colonel Sarwat, his second-in-command. Mahmood had gained control of Algeria via a coup d'etat during the previous game, and now the NAPF has just launched an offensive into a neighboring unnamed country, while the SEAL team is enlisted to support local forces trying to repel the NAPF.

In the South Asian missions, "Killjoy" and "Simple" are replaced by British Special Boat Service operatives "Flash" and "Chopper". In these missions the player battles a piracy organization called "The Fist and Fire".

The last missions take place in Poland, where the SEALs battle a well funded, ultra-nationalist terrorist organization called the New Slavic Order (NSO). In these missions, "Flash" and "Chopper" are replaced by GROM operatives "Deadpan" and "Coldkill".

== Development ==
Zipper Interactive decided to require SOCOM 3 U.S. Navy SEALs players to verify their identities by using a credit card, debit cards, or VISA gift cards. If the players do not verify themselves, they will not be granted ranks, allowed to join friends' lists, ranked games or clans. The PAL version of SOCOM 3 U.S. Navy SEALs did not need to be verified for online play. The SOCOM blog, set up by the Sony PlayStation team to give players a look at the making of the game, stated that this was meant to keep SOCOM cheaters away from the game.

The game is situated in Poland, South Asia and North Africa. The South Asia area of operation was originally specified as Bangladesh, but was changed after a complaint from the Bangladeshi government.

The first Map Pack was released for a free two-week trial on June 27, 2006. After the two-week trial, players had the opportunity to purchase the map pack through the SOCOM Store in the SOCOM community section. Two more map packs were released containing maps from SOCOM and SOCOM 2.

== Reception ==
Reception

Aggregate score
| Aggregator | Score |
|---|---|
| Metacritic | 82/100 |

SOCOM 3 U.S. Navy SEALs received "generally positive" reviews, according to review aggregator Metacritic.
