= Zipper Interactive =

Defunct American video game developer

- Type: Subsidiary
- Industry: Video games
- Founded: 1995; 31 years ago
- Defunct: 2012
- Fate: Closed
- Headquarters: Redmond, Washington, United States
- Key people: Brian Soderberg; Jim Bosler; Mike Gutmann
- Products: MechWarrior 3 Crimson Skies; SOCOM series MAG
- Parent: SCE Worldwide Studios (2006–2012)

Zipper Interactive was an American video game developer based in Redmond, Washington and part of SCE Worldwide Studios. It was founded in June 1995 by Jim Bosler and Brian Soderberg. It is best known for developing the SOCOM U.S. Navy SEALs series of games. SOCOM U.S. Navy SEALs was created in collaboration with the Naval Special Warfare Command and published by Sony Computer Entertainment for the PlayStation 2. On January 25, 2006, Sony announced that it had acquired Zipper Interactive to add it to its group of development studios.

== Games ==
Game title	Year released	Platform
DeathDrome	1996	Microsoft Windows
Top Gun: Hornet's Nest	1998	Microsoft Windows
Recoil	1999	Microsoft Windows
MechWarrior 3	1999	Microsoft Windows
MechWarrior 3: Pirate's Moon	1999	Microsoft Windows
Crimson Skies	2000	Microsoft Windows
SOCOM U.S. Navy SEALs	2002	PlayStation 2
SOCOM II U.S. Navy SEALs	2003	PlayStation 2
SOCOM 3 U.S. Navy SEALs	2005	PlayStation 2
SOCOM U.S. Navy SEALs: Fireteam Bravo	2005	PlayStation Portable
SOCOM U.S. Navy SEALs: Combined Assault	2006	PlayStation 2
SOCOM U.S. Navy SEALs: Fireteam Bravo 2	2006	PlayStation Portable
MAG	2010	PlayStation 3
SOCOM 4 U.S. Navy SEALs	2011	PlayStation 3
Unit 13	2012	PlayStation Vita

== Closure ==
On March 29, 2012, Sony announced that it would be closing Zipper Interactive due to "resource re-alignment." The closure of Zipper Interactive was later confirmed by Sony Computer Entertainment the next day on March 30, 2012. Prior to its closure, Zipper Interactive were working on two unannounced titles for the PlayStation 4 before both projects were cancelled once the closing was complete. One was another entry in the SOCOM U.S. Navy SEALs series, and the other was a first-person shooter meant to be a new IP.
