= SOCOM U.S. Navy SEALs: Confrontation =

2008 video game

- Developer: Slant Six Games
- Publisher: Sony Computer Entertainment
- Designer: Allen Goode
- Composer: Justin Burnett
- Series: SOCOM U.S. Navy SEALs
- Platform: PlayStation 3
- Release: NA: October 14, 2008; EU: March 13, 2009; AU: March 19, 2009
- Genre: Tactical shooter
- Mode: Multiplayer

SOCOM U.S. Navy SEALs: Confrontation is a discontinued online multiplayer tactical third-person shooter video game developed by Slant Six Games and published by Sony Computer Entertainment for the PlayStation 3. It was initially released in 2008 in North America and released worldwide the following year. Confrontation came packaged with the PlayStation 3 Bluetooth headset or as a standalone game and also released as a downloadable title from PlayStation Network. The player is able to customize their character, choosing from a list of predefined items.

Online multiplayer servers were originally shut down on January 28, 2014, along with the servers for SOCOM 4 U.S. Navy SEALs. In 2021, fans working to reverse engineer servers for defunct games unofficially made online play for the game possible again through private servers.

== Gameplay ==
Confrontation focuses on online play. Teamwork is essential to success in the game, as this phrase says: "Alone I'm Lethal, as a team I Dominate". The player is able to customize their character, choosing from a list of pre-defined items, using mix and match. This includes armour (light, medium and heavy; both leg and torso; for commando and mercenary), camouflage (head, shirts, pants, armour, straps and mask), and weapons attachments (two slots, weapon specific; e.g. front grip and suppressor on the M4A1 assault rifle). The game features several playable special forces teams: the United States Navy SEALs, U.K.'s Special Air Service (SAS), Germany's Kommando Spezialkräfte (KSK), Spain's Unidad de Operaciones Especiales (UOE), and France's 1er Régiment de Parachutistes d'Infanterie de Marine (1er RPIMa).

== Development and release ==
An early screenshot of SOCOM: Confrontation

SOCOM: Confrontation was officially announced during Sony Computer Entertainment America (SCEA) Gamers' Day on May 17, 2007, by Scott Steinberg, SCEA's Vice President of Product Marketing.

With the release of the SOCOM series website, it was announced that the game was scheduled to be released on September 16, 2008. However, SCEA Director of Development Seth Luisi announced that the game would be delayed one month so they can deliver "the best SOCOM online experience possible."

When Confrontation was released, the game was missing several features that were claimed on the cover of the box and in the manual. The game received a patch on January 9, 2009, version 1.30, which claimed to fix several issues including frame rate and invisible gun glitch, however some of these issues still remained. New features that were missing during release including trophy support were included with the patch. After the patch came out, online players increased by 50% and the number of players per hour increased 33%.

Sony turned off the servers on January 28, 2014.

=== PlayStation Home ===
Slant Six Games has released a themed space dedicated to SOCOM: U.S. Navy SEALs Confrontation in the PlayStation 3's online community-based service, PlayStation Home. The space is called "SOCOM: Tactical Operations Center" (TOC). At this SOCOM strategy post, users are able to plot the next course of action with their friends by gathering around the "SOCOM Telestrator" tool and coordinating their next assault. Chock full of maps and modes from SOCOM: Confrontation, the Telestrator is a powerful tool that the Home community can use to collaborate, strategize, and enhance their gameplay experience. On top of this, the TOC boasts a regional "SOCOM Leaderboard" that pulls data from the SOCOM site and updates Career stats (such as all-time ranking, kills, deaths, and kills/deaths ratio) in real-time. There is also a "TOC Terminal" where users can read up on the Crossroads, Urban Wasteland, Quarantine, Fallen, Kasbah, Desert Glory, and Frostfire maps. As of July 16, 2009, users can purchase SOCOM themed clothing for their avatars from the PlayStation Home shopping complex. This space is the first installment of the two-part SOCOM Home hub that is the ideal 3D locale for the SOCOM community to meet up and socialize. This space was released on June 18, 2009, for the North American version of PlayStation Home, on July 2, 2009, for the European version, and on August 27, 2009, for the Japanese version. On April 15, 2010, the awaited second part of the SOCOM Home hub was released. The "SOCOM: Opposing Force" (OPFOR) Game Space features a 5-Finger Fillet mini-game with leaderboards. The main attraction of the OPFOR Game Space, however, is the ability to assemble an assault weapon. Players who can assemble the assault weapon in 12 seconds will unlock a Golden AK-47 for use in SOCOM: Confrontation. This makes the first Game Space in Home to award items for use in the game the space is based on.

Outso developed the "SOCOM Telestrator" for Slant Six Games in the SOCOM: TOC Game Space.

== Reception ==
Reception

Aggregate score
Aggregator	Score
Metacritic	63/100

Review scores
Publication	Score
Game Informer	6.0/10
GameSpot	6.5/10
GamesRadar+	6.0/10
GameTrailers	7.5/10
IGN	4.5/10
NZGamer.com	7.8/10
PlayStation Universe	8.5/10

SOCOM: Confrontation received generally mixed reviews. Many reviewers criticized its technical issues, lag, missing features, and that there were only seven maps at launch. Shortly after the game's release, many complaint posts were made on the official SOCOM forums. A major bug present at the game's release caused many player's systems to crash while either looking for a match or at other various points during gameplay. Several patches have fixed the majority of these problems, though the game was still seen as a failure on Slant Six Games' part.
