= SOCOM U.S. Navy SEALs: Combined Assault =

2006 video game

- Developer: Zipper Interactive
- Publisher: Sony Computer Entertainment
- Series: SOCOM U.S. Navy SEALs
- Platform: PlayStation 2
- Release: NA: November 7, 2006; EU: May 18, 2007; AU: May 24, 2007
- Genres: Third-person shooter, tactical shooter
- Modes: Single-player, multiplayer

SOCOM U.S. Navy SEALs: Combined Assault is a 2006 tactical third-person shooter video game developed by Zipper Interactive and published by Sony Computer Entertainment for the PlayStation 2. It is the last installment of the series to be released on the PlayStation 2.

Combined Assault's campaign mode offers 18 missions. The game takes place in the fictional country of Adjikistan. The country is supposedly situated somewhere in Central Asia near Afghanistan and Pakistan, featuring a number of different environment and climate zones—allowing for the game to feature a wide variety of landscapes and settings while working within one large, connected story.

The online servers for this game, along with other PlayStation 2 and PlayStation Portable SOCOM titles, were shut down on August 31, 2012.

== Gameplay ==
One of the main new features of this game is the ability to play the story mode online, replacing the AI SEAL team with up to three other players via online play. Players can play single player campaign missions, or the instant action missions. This mode allows the player to play any unlocked levels in single player on a variety of game modes. Players can also unlock "Badges" after completing specific objectives. After a player receives a certain amount of badges, they unlock weapons and weapon attachments. These unlocked weapons are used mainly in offline mode, but two weapons can be used in online multiplayer matches. It is also possible to complete the campaign mode in any order the player wishes (for example: players can complete objectives in no specific order, and players can choose which mission to play).

New items include medkits and ammunition kits, able to revive/heal a SEAL team member and replenish ammunition of multiple types of weapons respectively. Body Armor is an option and Beanbag Launchers are a non-lethal alternative to stunning an opponent in combat. In addition, the online play section includes all the SOCOM 3 multiplayer maps as well 10 new multiplayer maps for Combined Assault. As of March 31, 2008, three map packs have been released, adding 11 more maps. The first map pack was released on June 27, 2006, and contained the three HDD Maps from SOCOM II. The maps are "After Hours", "Last Bastion" and "Liberation". Players were given two weeks (until July 10, 2006), to play these maps online for free. The second map pack has been released with a new patch on November 19, 2007. There are four maps, and they are "Blizzard", "Desert Glory", "Abandoned" and "Blood Lake". Each other these maps were in both SOCOM and SOCOM II. With the release of the second map pack, players were not given a two-week trial period like with the first one. It is available for free via the SOCOM Store. The third map pack has been released on March 31, 2008. The four new maps include Frostfire, Fish Hook, Guidance, and Crossroads. With the release of the third map pack, Zipper Interactive decided to release the map packs for free.

== Story ==
More than 20 years after the Soviet Union's collapse, the former Adjikistani Socialist republic has finally gained independence. The charismatic Ismail Karim is appointed Adjikistan's first president. He promises an economy more competitive than that of other "hot" Asian nations such as China or Cambodia. This makes Adjikistan a key American interest. However, not all is going smoothly. A large rebel movement threatens to destabilize the government, and after a CIA asset is kidnapped by the rebels, a SEAL team is sent in to rescue him; however, the helicopter is shot down after the spy has been saved.

The character's fireteam is sent in to rescue the survivors (this mission seeming to parallel the real-world Operation Red Wings), and the team becomes increasingly embroiled in the conflict. However, the rebels claim that they are not trying to topple a benevolent government; rather they are protecting themselves from a genocidal campaign waged by Adjikistani authorities. The SEALs later discover a system of concentration camps in a major Adjikistani city and shut it down. During a later mission, the SEALs infiltrate a village to eliminate the terrorist Mongoose, secure the rebel leader Badger, and secure an airstrip wearing ghillie suits under the cover of darkness. During the low-scale war the fireteam launches an assault against a convoy carrying supplies through a key village. During that mission they planted explosives at a weapons cache site and demolished it before extracting. Eventually, Karim is cornered in his underground bunker under his Political Party Headquarters located in the Adjikistani capital of Dalahtibar and is arrested and tried for crimes against humanity.

== Reception ==
Reception

Aggregate score
| Aggregator | Score |
|---|---|
| Metacritic | 72/100 |

SOCOM U.S. Navy SEALs: Combined Assault received "mixed or average" reviews, according to review aggregator Metacritic.
